= Carlos Massad =

Chilean politician and economist

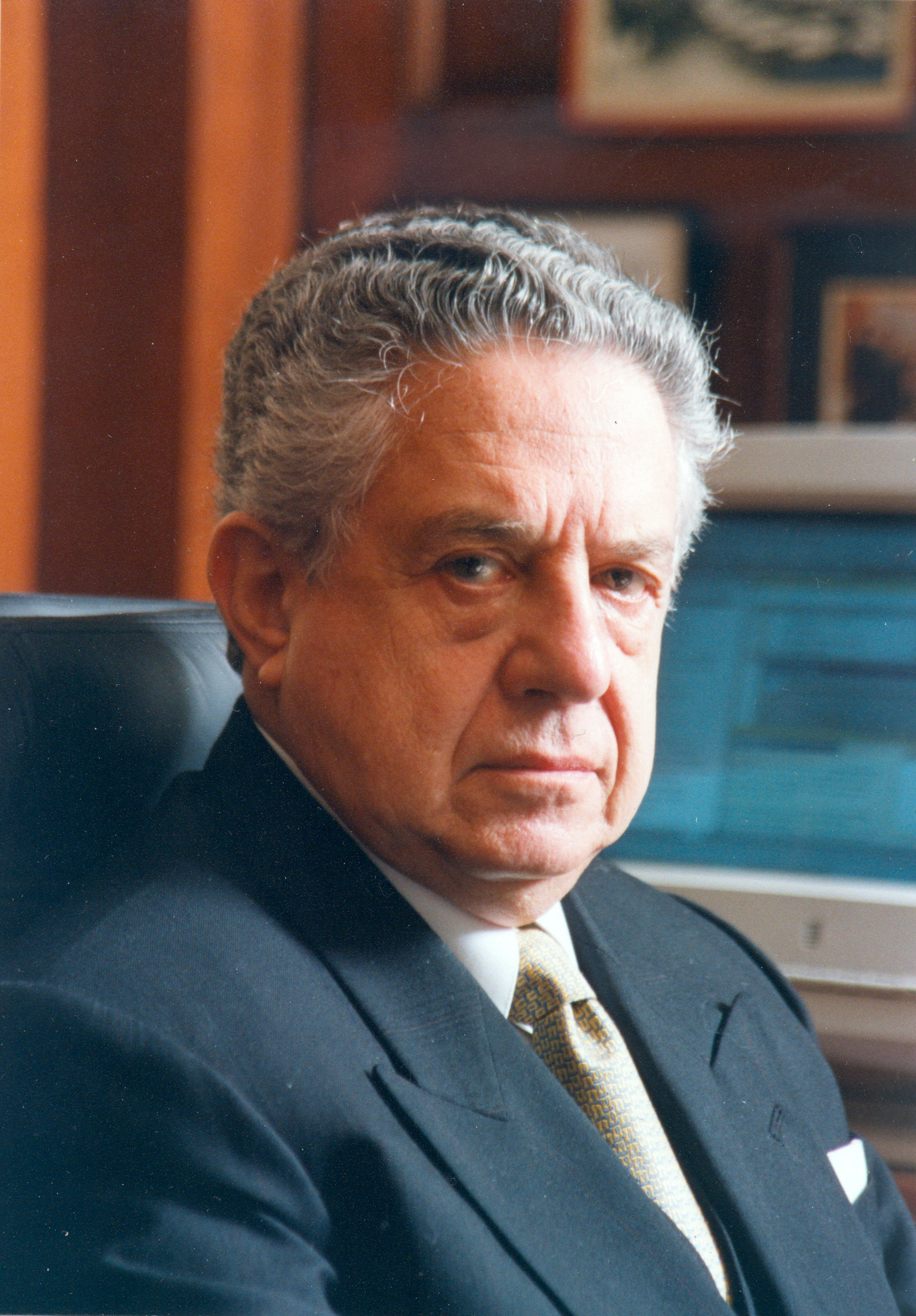
- Massad in 1998

President of the Central Bank of Chile
- In office 16 September 1996 – 1 May 2003
- President: Eduardo Frei Ruíz-Tagle (1994−2000); Ricardo Lagos (2000−2006)
- Preceded by: Roberto Zalher
- Succeeded by: Vitorio Corbo
- In office 1967 – 3 November 1970
- President: Eduardo Frei Montalva
- Preceded by: Sergio Molina Silva
- Succeeded by: Alfonso Inostroza Cuevas

Counsellor of the Central Bank of Chile
- In office 16 September 1996 – 1 May 2003
- Preceded by: Roberto Zahler
- Succeeded by: Vittorio Corbo

Ministry of Health
- In office 11 March 1994 – 7 August 1996
- Preceded by: Julio Montt
- Succeeded by: Álex Figueroa

President of the Bank of Talca
- In office 1979 – 15 April 1982
- Preceded by: Carlos Icaza Silva
- Succeeded by: Office abolished

Executive Vice President of the Central Bank
- In office 1964–1967
- Preceded by: Sergio Molina Silva
- Succeeded by: Jorge Cauas

Personal details
- Born: 29 August 1932 (age 94) Santiago, Chile
- Party: Christian Democratic Party
- Spouse: María Lidia Guzmán (widover) (1956−2020)
- Children: Five
- Parent(s): Rafael Massad; María Abud
- Education: University of Chile (BA); University of Chicago (Master of Arts) (Ph.D.)
- Occupation: Politician
- Profession: Economist

Carlos Alberto Massad Abud (29 August 1932) was a Chilean politician and economist, who served as minister and was two-times president of the Central Bank of Chile.

In 1982, he was involved in the economic scandal of the Bank of Talca alongside Sebastián Piñera.

== Early life ==
Of Lebanese descent, he was the son of Rafael Massad and María Abud. He was educated at the Internado Nacional Barros Arana in Santiago.

He earned a degree in business administration and a bachelor's degree in economics from the University of Chile in 1954, graduating with highest honors. He later received a Master of Arts degree from the University of Chicago in 1958 and pursued doctoral studies there as a Ph.D. candidate, completing his coursework in 1964.

=== Marriage and children ===
He married María Lidia Guzmán Iturra in 1956, and they had five children: María Lily, Carlos, Patricia, Paulina, and Isabel Margarita. She died on 18 September 2020.

== Public career ==
=== Early career ===
He served as vice president of the Central Bank of Chile from 1964 to 1967 and as its president from 1967 to 1970.

He was also director of the Institute of Economics at the University of Chile from 1959 to 1964 and Executive Director for Chile at the International Monetary Fund between 1970 and 1974.

From 1974 to 1992, he held several positions at the Economic Commission for Latin America and the Caribbean (ECLAC), a regional commission of the United Nations. His responsibilities included serving as consultant, project coordinator, and Deputy Executive Secretary. He also worked as a consultant and member of the Economic Research Evaluation Council at the World Bank from 1978 to 1981.

In 1982, he was formally charged in connection with alleged fraud involving the Banco de Talca, of which he was chairman, together with Sebastián Piñera and Emiliano Figueroa Sandoval. The proceedings (Case No. 99,971) arose from alleged violations of Chile's Banking Law. Prosecutors alleged that the defendants, through an external consulting firm, charged substantial fees to the bank and, as directors, had extended significant loans to shell companies they had established, subsequently reinvesting those funds in the bank in a manner that allegedly resulted in fictitious capitalization. Their attorneys appealed to the Court of Appeals of Chile, filing a petition for habeas corpus on 3 September 1982, which was denied. They subsequently appealed to the Supreme Court of Chile, which granted the petition and dismissed the case against them on 20 September 1982.

=== Concertación era ===
Until 1994, he served as executive president of the Eduardo Frei Montalva Foundation. That year, President Eduardo Frei Ruiz-Tagle appointed him Minister of Health, a position traditionally held by physicians. He remained in office until 1996, when he resigned to return to the presidency of the Central Bank of Chile.

Following the resignation of Roberto Zahler, Frei nominated him to the Central Bank's board. His appointment became the first such nomination to be rejected by the Senate of Chile since the country's return to democracy, by a vote of 21 to 20. Frei subsequently resubmitted his nomination, and on the second vote he secured confirmation as a board member by 23 votes to two, with one abstention.

His term was due to expire in December 1997, but President Frei nominated him for a new term extending to 2007. During his tenure, the most significant challenge faced by the Central Bank was the 1997 Asian financial crisis, which triggered an economic contraction and a sharp rise in unemployment in Chile.

Some critics of Massad's leadership argued that management of the crisis was concentrated within a small group consisting primarily of Massad, Finance Minister Eduardo Aninat, and Central Bank board members Manuel Marfán, Pablo Piñera, and Jorge Marshall. According to these accounts, key policy discussions took place in informal working meetings rather than formal board sessions, limiting the influence of the Bank's technical staff on major policy decisions. Economist Sebastián Edwards of the University of California later argued that Chile continued to bear the consequences of what he described as "Aninat's 1999 spending spree," referring to a combination of fiscal and monetary policies during the presidential election year. Vittorio Corbo, who succeeded Massad as Central Bank president, likewise maintained that economic growth slowed between 1996 and 1997 because of deteriorating business conditions and an overly expansionary monetary policy (El Mercurio, 29 November 2002, p. B3).</ref>

Massad resigned from the Central Bank in 2003 amid the Inverlink scandal. Critics argued that his principal responsibility lay in having hired Pamela Andrada as his secretary. She was accused of copying confidential information from his computer and transmitting it to executives at Inverlink, contributing to the scandal.

From 2004 to 2009, he served on the board of CorpBanca, then controlled by the Saieh Group. Despite having initially intended to avoid economic advisory roles after leaving the Central Bank, he accepted the appointment while also becoming involved with the Sacred Hearts Foundation, two Trappist institutions, and the Colegio Árabe.
