= Jaime Tohá =

Chilean politician

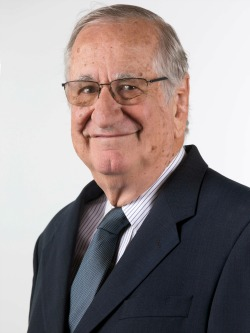
- Tohá in 2018

Member of the Chamber of Deputies
- In office 11 March 2018 – 11 March 2022
- Preceded by: Creation of the District
- Constituency: District 20

Intendant of Bío-Bío Region
- In office 2 December 2008 – 11 March 2010
- Appointed by: Michelle Bachelet
- President: Michelle Bachelet
- Preceded by: María Angélica Fuentes Villalba
- Succeeded by: Jacqueline van Rysselberghe
- In office 11 March 2000 – 11 March 2006
- Appointed by: Ricardo Lagos
- President: Ricardo Lagos
- Preceded by: Martín Zilic
- Succeeded by: María Soledad Tohá

Ambassador of Chile to Cuba
- In office 21 April 2006 – 28 November 2008
- Preceded by: César Moreno Laval
- Succeeded by: Gabriel Gaspar

Minister of Public Works
- In office 1 August 1998 – 11 March 2000
- President: Eduardo Frei Ruíz-Tagle
- Preceded by: Ricardo Lagos
- Succeeded by: Carlos Cruz Lorenzen

Minister of Economy, Development and Tourism
- In office 16 December 1993 – 11 March 1994
- President: Patricio Aylwin
- Preceded by: Jorge Marshall
- Succeeded by: Álvaro García Hurtado

Minister President of the National Commission of Energy
- In office 11 March 1990 – 11 March 1994
- President: Patricio Aylwin
- Preceded by: Herman Brady
- Succeeded by: Alejandro Jadresic

Minister of Agriculture
- In office 13 July 1973 – 11 September 1973
- President: Salvador Allende
- Preceded by: Ernesto Torrealba
- Succeeded by: Sergio Crespo Montero

Personal details
- Born: 16 July 1938 (age 88) Chillán, Chile
- Party: Socialist Party; Broad Party of Socialist Left (1988−1990)
- Spouse: Moira Lavandero Croxatto
- Children: Two
- Parent(s): José Tohá Soldavilla; Brunilda González
- Relatives: José and Isidoro (siblings); Carolina Tohá (niece); María Soledad Tohá (niece)
- Education: University of Chile (B.S); Technical University of Madrid (M.S)
- Occupation: Politician
- Profession: Engineer

Jaime Manuel Tohá González (born 9 August 1938) is a Chilean politician and engineer who served as minister of State in his country.

He has an honorary degree at the San Sebastián University.

== Family and early life ==
He was born in Chillán on 16 June 1938, the son of José Tohá Soldavilla and Brunilda González Monteagudo.

He is married to Moira Lavanderos Croxatto and has two children: Juan José and Jaime, the latter of whom served as a councillor of the Municipality of Santiago between 2004 and 2008.

He has four siblings: José Tohá González, former minister in the government of Salvador Allende, who died on 15 March 1974; former deputy Isidoro Tohá González, who died on 16 June 2007; Julia, who died on 15 November 2020; and María Montserrat.

His niece, Carolina Tohá Morales, served as a deputy, as a minister of State during the first government of President Michelle Bachelet, and as mayor of the Santiago municipality between 2012 and 2016.

== Education and professional career ==
He completed his secondary education at the Liceo José Victorino Lastarria in Santiago.

He later entered the University of Chile, where he qualified as a forest engineer. He undertook specialized studies at the Higher School of Water and Forests of Nancy, France (1963), and received training in silviculture at the Technical University of Madrid in Spain (1968).

Between 1970 and 1972, he served as Director of the Forestry Institute, and as Executive Secretary of CORFO’s Forestry Committee between 1972 and 1973.

From 1976 to 1988, he worked as a forestry expert for the Food and Agriculture Organization of the United Nations (FAO), in Mexico (1976–1977) and Mozambique (1977–1988).

On 29 October 2014, the San Sebastián University awarded him the degree of Doctor honoris causa in recognition of his public career.

== Political career ==
From his youth, he has been a member of the Socialist Party of Chile.

He served as Minister of Agriculture between 13 July 1973 and 11 September of the same year, under the government of President Salvador Allende.

Following the military coup of 11 September 1973, he was detained on Dawson Island from 15 September 1973 until October 1974, after which he was expelled from the country. He lived in exile in Mexico and returned to Chile during the 1980s.

After the return to democracy, he served as minister in the portfolios of Energy (1990) and Economy (1993–1994) during the government of President Patricio Aylwin.

He subsequently chaired several state-owned companies, including Colbún (1994–1997), the National Coal Company (ENACAR) (1997–1998), the Empresa Portuaria de Chile (EMPORCHI), and the Valparaíso Port Company (1998). Between 1 August 1998 and 11 March 2000, he served as Minister of Public Works during the presidency of Eduardo Frei Ruiz-Tagle.

During the 2000s, he served as Intendant of the Biobío Region on two occasions (2000–2006 and 2008–2010). He was also Ambassador of Chile to Cuba between 2007 and 2008.

On 8 April 2014, during the second government of President Michelle Bachelet, he was appointed a member of the Presidential Advisory Commission on Decentralization and Regional Development. In September of that year, he was appointed president of the Board of Directors of the Chilean Nuclear Energy Commission (CChEN). Between 2014 and 2017, he was also appointed National Coordinator of the Development Program for Lagging Zones.

In the elections of November 2013, he was elected Regional Councilor for the Santiago II Constituency of the Metropolitan Region, obtaining 28,032 votes, equivalent to 8.78% of the vote.

In November 2016, he resigned from that position to run as a candidate for the Chamber of Deputies of Chile in the November 2017 elections.

In the 2017 parliamentary elections, he was elected as a deputy on the La Fuerza de la Mayoría list for the Socialist Party of Chile, representing the 20th District of the Biobío Region for the 2018–2022 term. He obtained 8,145 votes, corresponding to 2.42% of the valid votes cast.

He did not seek re-election to the Chamber of Deputies in the parliamentary elections of 21 November 2021.
