= Manuel Marfán =

Chilean politician

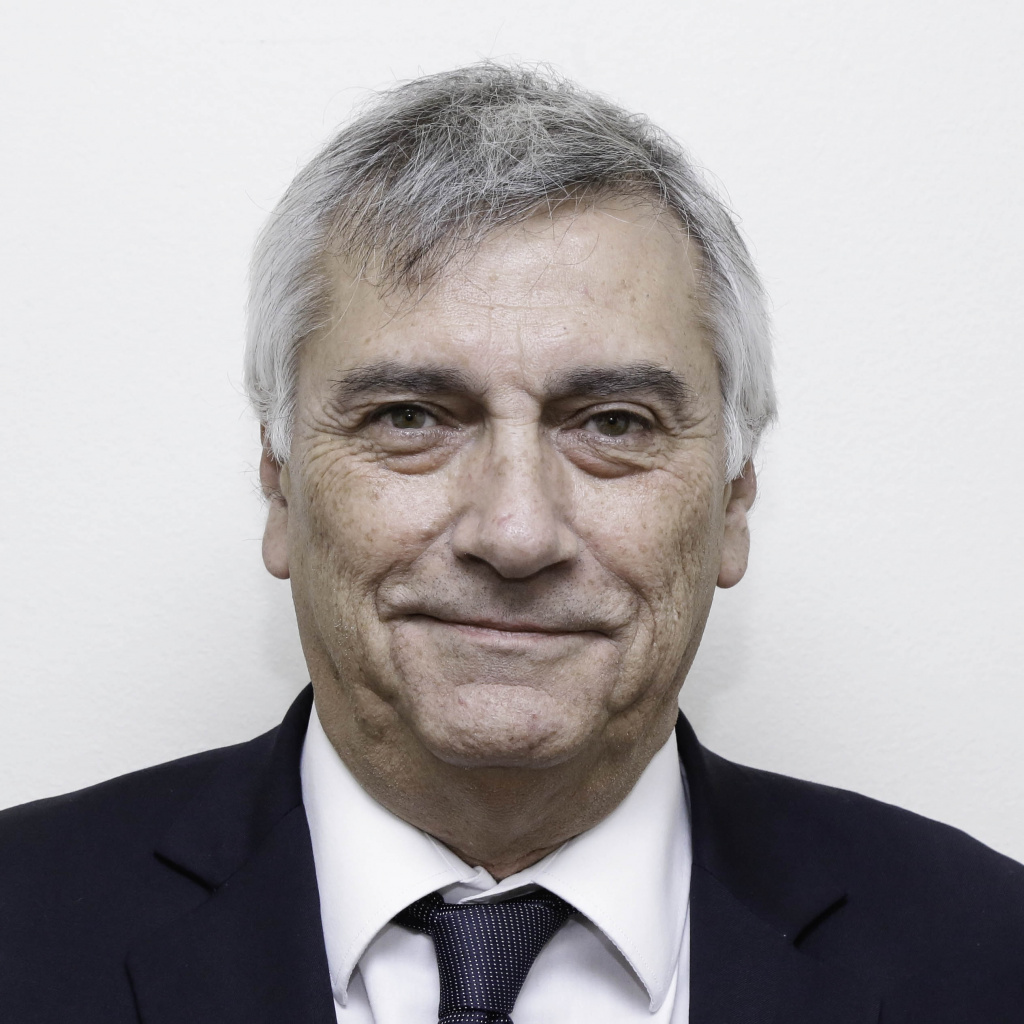

Vice president of the Central Bank
- In office 7 January 2010 – 17 December 2013
- Preceded by: Jorge Desormeaux
- Succeeded by: Enrique Marshall

Councillor of the Central Bank
- In office 18 December 2003 – 17 December 2013
- Appointed by: Ricardo Lagos
- President: Ricardo Lagos (2000−2006); Michelle Bachelet (2006−2010); Sebastián Piñera (2010−2014)
- Preceded by: Jorge Marshall
- Succeeded by: Pablo García Silva

Minister of Finance
- In office 3 December 1999 – 11 March 2000
- President: Eduardo Frei Ruíz-Tagle
- Preceded by: Eduardo Aninat
- Succeeded by: Nicolás Eyzaguirre

Undersecretary of Finance
- In office 11 March 1994 – 3 December 1999
- President: Eduardo Frei Ruíz-Tagle
- Preceded by: Jorge Rodríguez Grossi
- Succeeded by: Álvaro Clarke de la Cerda

Personal details
- Born: 26 December 1952 (age 73) Santiago, Chile
- Party: Socialist Party
- Spouse: Margarita Sánchez
- Children: Two
- Parent(s): Álvaro Marfán; Florence Lewis
- Education: University of Chile (LL.B); University of Yale (LL.M)
- Occupation: Politician
- Profession: Lawyer

José Manuel Marfán Lewis (born 26 December 1952) is a Chilean politician and economist who served as vice president of the Central Bank of Chile. Similarly, he served as Minister of Finance.

== Early life and education ==
Marfán is the son of Álvaro Marfán Jaramillo, a member of the Christian Democratic Party who worked at National Planning Office (ODEPLAN) and was a close adviser to President Eduardo Frei Montalva, and Florence Lewis Ravinet.

He is married to economist Margarita Sánchez Muñoz, daughter of Salustio Sánchez Carmona, who served as a municipal councillor for Talca in 1947.

Marfán studied business administration (ingeniería comercial) at the University of Chile before earning a Ph.D. in economics from Yale University in the United States.

== Political career ==
Marfán was one of the principal architects of the tax reform enacted during the first Concertación administration under President Patricio Aylwin, serving as a close adviser to Finance Minister Alejandro Foxley. Before entering government, he had worked with Foxley at CIEPLAN in developing the economic platform of the democratic opposition to Augusto Pinochet.

He served as Minister of Finance under President Eduardo Frei Ruiz-Tagle from December 1999 to March 2000, succeeding Eduardo Aninat, who resigned to assume a senior position at the International Monetary Fund (IMF). Prior to his appointment, Marfán had served as regional adviser and director of the Economic Development Division at the Economic Commission for Latin America and the Caribbean (ECLAC).

Earlier, he had served as Undersecretary of Finance and chairman of the Capital Markets Committee of the Ministry of Finance from 1994 to 1999.

As a member of the Socialist Party of Chile, Marfán became the only Socialist politician to serve as Minister of Finance during the four Concertación administrations. He was also the first Socialist to hold the office since Felipe Herrera, who served during the second administration of President Carlos Ibáñez del Campo.

== Other activities ==
Marfán has advised the governments of Bolivia, Colombia, Ecuador, the Dominican Republic, and Paraguay on macroeconomic and fiscal policy, as well as the Legislative Assembly of Costa Rica.

He has published extensively in academic journals and books in Chile and abroad. He has taught macroeconomics and fiscal policy at the University of Chile, the Pontifical Catholic University of Chile, ILADES–Georgetown University, the Latin American and Caribbean Institute for Economic and Social Planning (ILPES), and the Seminar on Economic Policies for Latin America (SPEAL).

In August 2008, he was appointed chairman of the Irving Fisher Committee on Central Bank Statistics (IFC), an organization affiliated with the International Statistical Institute (ISI) and sponsored by the Bank for International Settlements (BIS) in Basel.

In January 2010, he became vice president of the Central Bank of Chile following the departure of Jorge Desormeaux. He was re-elected to the position in early 2012.

He is a senior researcher at CIEPLAN and director of the CIEPLAN–University of Talca Program. He also serves as chairman of the board of Chile Transparente.

During the second administration of President Sebastián Piñera in 2018, Marfán was appointed a member of the National Comprehensive Development Agreement (Acuerdo Nacional de Desarrollo Integral).
