= Eduardo Aninat =

Chilean politician (born 1948)

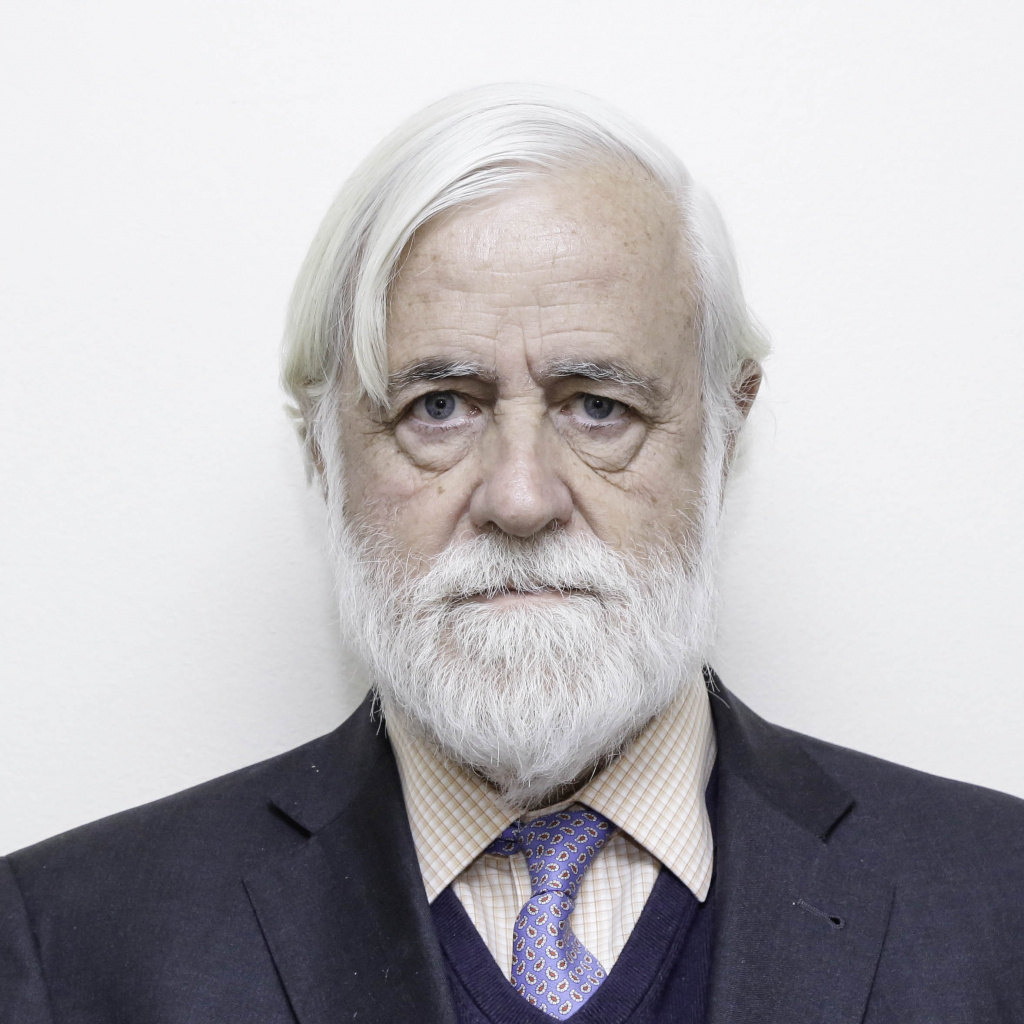

Minister of Finance
- In office 11 March 1994 – 3 December 1999
- President: Eduardo Frei Ruíz-Tagle
- Preceded by: Alejandro Foxley
- Succeeded by: Manuel Marfán

Personal details
- Born: 25 February 1948 (age 78) Concepción, Chile
- Party: Christian Democratic Party
- Spouse: María Teresa Sahli
- Children: Eduardo Sahli Ureta; Matias Sahli Ureta; Teresita Sahli Ureta (b. 1973); María Magdelene Sahli Ureta (b. 1975); María Francisca Sahli Ureta (b. 1979); María Isabel Sahli Ureta
- Education: Pontifical Catholic University of Chile (BA); Harvard University (M.A. and Ph.D. in economics)
- Profession: Economist

Eduardo Aninat Ureta (born 25 February 1948) is an economist and a Chilean politician who served as the country's Minister of Finance from March 1994 to December 1999.

== Personal life ==
Eduardo was born in 1948 to Eduardo Aninat de Viale-Rigo and María Cristina Ureta Morandé. He has two sisters: Francisca Aninat Ureta and Isabel Aninat Ureta. He completed his primary and secondary studies at Saint George's College in Santiago. Eduardo received his B.A. in Economics at the Pontifical Catholic University of Chile, and attended Harvard University, receiving an M.A. and Ph.D. in Economics. He is married to María Teresa Sahli, and the couple have six children: two sons (Eduardo and Matias) and four daughters (Teresita (b. 1973), María Magdelene (b. 1975), María Francisca (b. 1979), and María Isabel).

== Career ==
After earning his Ph. D., Eduardo returned to his alma mater, the Pontifical Catholic University of Chile, to teach Economics. Later, he taught at Boston University as an assistant professor. Between 1981 and 1994, he was a principal member of an economic consulting firm, Aninat, Méndez & Associates, working with various Latin American governments and international organisations such as the World Bank on tax policy and national debt restructuring. Harvard University hired him to act as the Latin American Coordinator for its International Tax Program in 1989. He served on the board of directors for Accion International, an international economic nonprofit organisation.

As time went on, Eduardo became more involved in national and international politics. He joined Chile's Christian Democratic Party in 1989. In March 1990, the President of Chile, Patricio Aylwin, appointed him as the official negotiator for the Chilean foreign debt, a position he held until March 1991. This was his largest role in the Chilean government until the election of Eduardo Frei Ruiz-Tagle as President in 1993. Ruiz-Tagle appointed Eduardo as Minister of Finance. He remained in the position for the entirety of Ruiz-Tagle's presidency, serving as the country's chief senior negotiator for the Canada–Chile Free Trade Agreement and overseeing a drop in national inflation from 8% at the beginning of his term to 6% in 1997.

His management of the country's response to the 1997 Asian financial crisis received a degree of criticism from the press for the manner in which all decisions were made within informal meetings between a small and closed circle, essentially made up of Aninat, and the directors of the Central Bank of Chile—Carlos Massad, Manuel Marfán, Pablo Piñera and Jorge Marshall. Little input or analysis was accepted from technical staff at either the Bank or the Ministry; decisions made by Aninat and the bank's directors were presented only for ratification.

In addition to his service to the Chilean government, he also sat as Chairman of the Board of Governors of the International Monetary Fund and the World Bank between 1995 and 1996, and represented the nations of Chile, Argentina, Bolivia, Peru, Uruguay, and Paraguay on the World Bank's Development Committee. After leaving the Ministry of Finance in December 1999, he took the role of Managing Director of the International Monetary Fund, succeeding Alassane D. Ouattara for a five-year term that ended in June 2003. After leaving this role, he served as the Chilean Ambassador to Mexico from February 2005 to June 2006, followed by a term as Director of the Center for Applied Globalization at Finis Terrae University, and has remained as an international consultant to various groups, ranging from the Goldman Sachs Group to the Center for Financial Stability.

Eduardo remained a member of the Christian Democratic Party until 2017, when he resigned in protest over "clumsiness and disloyalty" within the party, stating to the press:

“Months ago I had stopped agitating for change, but I had done it with the hope that [President] Carolina Goic's clean and courageous campaign would be the breath of unity and renewal of the [Party] that we all needed. None of that happened: there was clumsiness and disloyalty"
