= Alejandro Jadresic =

Chilean industrial engineer, economist, and academic

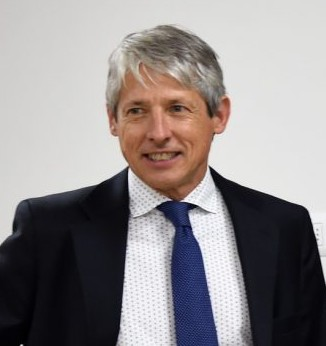

Minister of Energy
- In office 11 March 1994 – 1996
- President: Eduardo Frei Ruiz-Tagle
- Preceded by: Jaime Tohá
- Succeeded by: Álvaro García Hurtado

Personal details
- Born: 6 June 1956 Santiago, Chile
- Died: 5 June 2019 (aged 62) Santiago, Chile
- Spouse: Francesca Di Girólamo
- Children: 2
- Education: University of Chile (B.Sc); Harvard University (Ph.D)
- Profession: Economist

Alejandro Jadresic Marinovic (6 June 1956 – 5 June 2019) was a Chilean industrial engineer, economist and an academic. He served as Minister of Energy (1994–1998) under the government of Eduardo Frei.

After completing his studies in the United States, Jadresic returned to Chile and began to make a living as a teacher. He also became politically active in campaigns that supported an end to the Pinochet regime, nevertheless he always remained an independent from the major anti-Pinochet political parties.

He was Dean of the Faculty of Engineering and Sciences at the Adolfo Ibáñez University, he also was a board member of Entel (Chile's main telecommunications company) and director of Jadresic Consulting Ltd a business services firm.

== Biography ==
He attended the Liceo Arturo Alessandri Palma in Providencia, Santiago, and was admitted to the University of Chile after scoring 812 on the national Academic Aptitude Test (PAA), one of the highest scores in the country that year. He graduated with a degree in industrial engineering in 1981 and later earned a doctorate from Harvard University in the United States in 1984.

After returning to Chile, he worked as a university lecturer and became associated with the movement opposing General Augusto Pinochet, while maintaining his political independence. He subsequently worked at CIEPLAN, the Economic Commission for Latin America and the Caribbean (ECLAC), the Inter-American Development Bank (IDB), and the United Nations Development Programme (UNDP). During the administration of Patricio Aylwin, he joined the Ministry of Economy, Development and Reconstruction, where he served as coordinator of sectoral policies.

He later directed the policy platform for the Independent Movement supporting Eduardo Frei Ruiz-Tagle during the 1993 Chilean presidential election. After being elected president, Frei appointed him president of the National Energy Commission, a position he held from 1994 to 1998.

He also served as chairman of the Central Preventive Commission, the agency then responsible for competition law enforcement. In July 2004, he joined the Electricity Panel, the body responsible for resolving disputes among companies in the electricity sector. He resigned from the panel in mid-2007, despite having been appointed to a six-year term.

He served on the boards of several companies and was a member of the government commission that studied the feasibility of developing nuclear power in Chile.

From 2006 to 2018, he was dean of the Faculty of Engineering and Sciences at the Adolfo Ibáñez University. During his tenure, he was elected to the Executive Committee of the Global Engineering Deans Council, an international network of engineering deans.

== Awards ==
Jadresic was awarded the Best Engineer Award 2005 from the School of Engineers of Chile and the Order of Prince Trpimir from the Republic of Croatia.
