= Carlos Montes Cisternas =

Chilean politician

Carlos Montes
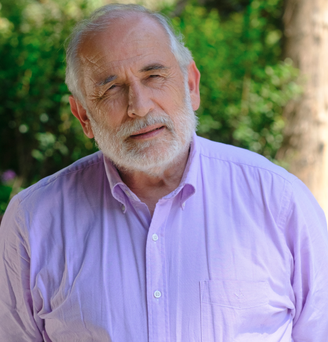

Minister of Housing & Urbanism
- In office 11 March 2022 – 11 March 2026
- President: Gabriel Boric
- Preceded by: Felipe Ward
- Succeeded by: Iván Poduje

President of the Senate of Chile
- In office 11 March 2018 – 12 March 2019
- Preceded by: Andrés Zaldívar
- Succeeded by: Jaime Quintana

Member of the Senate of Chile
- Incumbent
- Assumed office 11 March 2014
- Preceded by: Soledad Alvear
- Constituency: 8th Circunscription (Santiago Centro)

President of the Chamber of Deputies
- In office 11 March 1999 – 22 March 2000
- Preceded by: Gutenberg Martínez
- Succeeded by: Víctor Barrueto

Member of the Chamber of Deputies
- In office 11 March 1990 – 11 March 2010
- Preceded by: District created
- Succeeded by: Camila Vallejo
- Constituency: 26th District (La Florida)

Personal details
- Born: 11 May 1946 (age 80) Santiago, Chile
- Party: Christian Democratic Party; Popular Unitary Action Movement; Party for Democracy; Socialist Party
- Children: Javiera Montes Cruz
- Parent(s): Carlos José Montes; María Elena Cisternas
- Education: Pontifical Catholic University of Chile (B.Sc)
- Occupation: Politician
- Profession: Economist
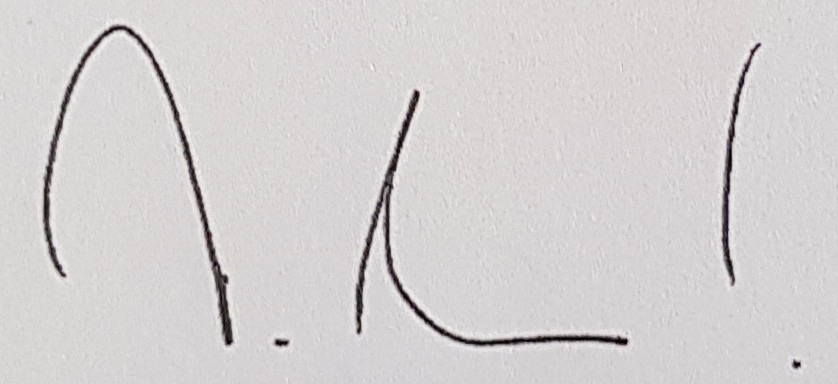
- Signature

Carlos Eduardo Montes Cisternas (born 11 May 1946) is a Chilean politician and economist, member of the Socialist Party of Chile. Since March 11, 2022, he has served as the Minister of Housing and Urban Development in the administration of President Gabriel Boric.

He was elected as a deputy for District 26, La Florida, for six consecutive terms (1990-2014) and as a senator of the Republic representing the VIII Electoral District, Santiago Oriente, for one term (2014-2022).

He served as President of the Chamber of Deputies of Chile (1999-2000) and as President of the Senate of Chile (March 11, 2018 - March 12, 2019). He was part of the founding group of the Popular Unitary Action Movement (MAPU) and the Party for Democracy (PPD).

== Early life and family ==
He was born on 11 May 1946 in Santiago, Chile. He is the son of Carlos José Montes and María Elena Cisternas. He is married to Gloria Cruz, with whom had three children.

His daughter Javiera Montes Cruz, also a politician, died on 12 February 2025.

== Professional career ==
He completed his secondary education at Saint George’s College in 1964. He later studied Economics at the Pontifical Catholic University of Chile.

During his exile in Mexico, he pursued further studies in economics and, between 1981 and 1985, taught economics at various universities in that country. He was later appointed Director of the Center for Regional Studies at the Autonomous University of Puebla.

After returning to Chile, between 1987 and 1990, he served as Director of the Cordillera Center for Municipal Studies.

== Political career ==
He began his political activity as a neighborhood leader at the age of 15. During his university years, he was a leader of the Federation of Students of the Pontifical Catholic University of Chile (FEUC) and a student representative on the Superior Council of the Pontifical Catholic University of Chile.

In 1969, he was part of the founding group of the Popular Unitary Action Movement (MAPU), which emerged as a split from the Christian Democratic Party. He served as a leader of the movement until 1989, following its merger and incorporation into the Socialist Party of Chile.

After the 1973 coup d'état, he led MAPU clandestinely until his arrest in December 1980. He was held for one month by the National Intelligence Center (CNI), where he was interrogated and tortured, and was later imprisoned in the Public Prison. In October 1981, he went into exile with his family in Mexico.

He returned from exile in 1985 and, together with a team, began work on the democratization of neighborhood councils. In 1988, he served as coordinator of the No campaign in the Metropolitan Region of Santiago.

He was part of the founding group of the Party for Democracy (PPD) and served on its First Political Commission until June 1992, when he ended his dual party membership. Within the Socialist Party of Chile, he became a member of the Central Committee. In 1988, he also served as a leader of the No campaign command for the Metropolitan Region during the national plebiscite.

In October 2000, he was appointed by President Ricardo Lagos as a member of the Presidential Advisory Commission for the Bicentennial of the Republic of Chile.

On 21 January 2022, he was appointed Minister of Housing and Urban Development by President-elect Gabriel Boric. He assumed office on 11 March 2022.
