= Banco de Talca =

Chilean bank

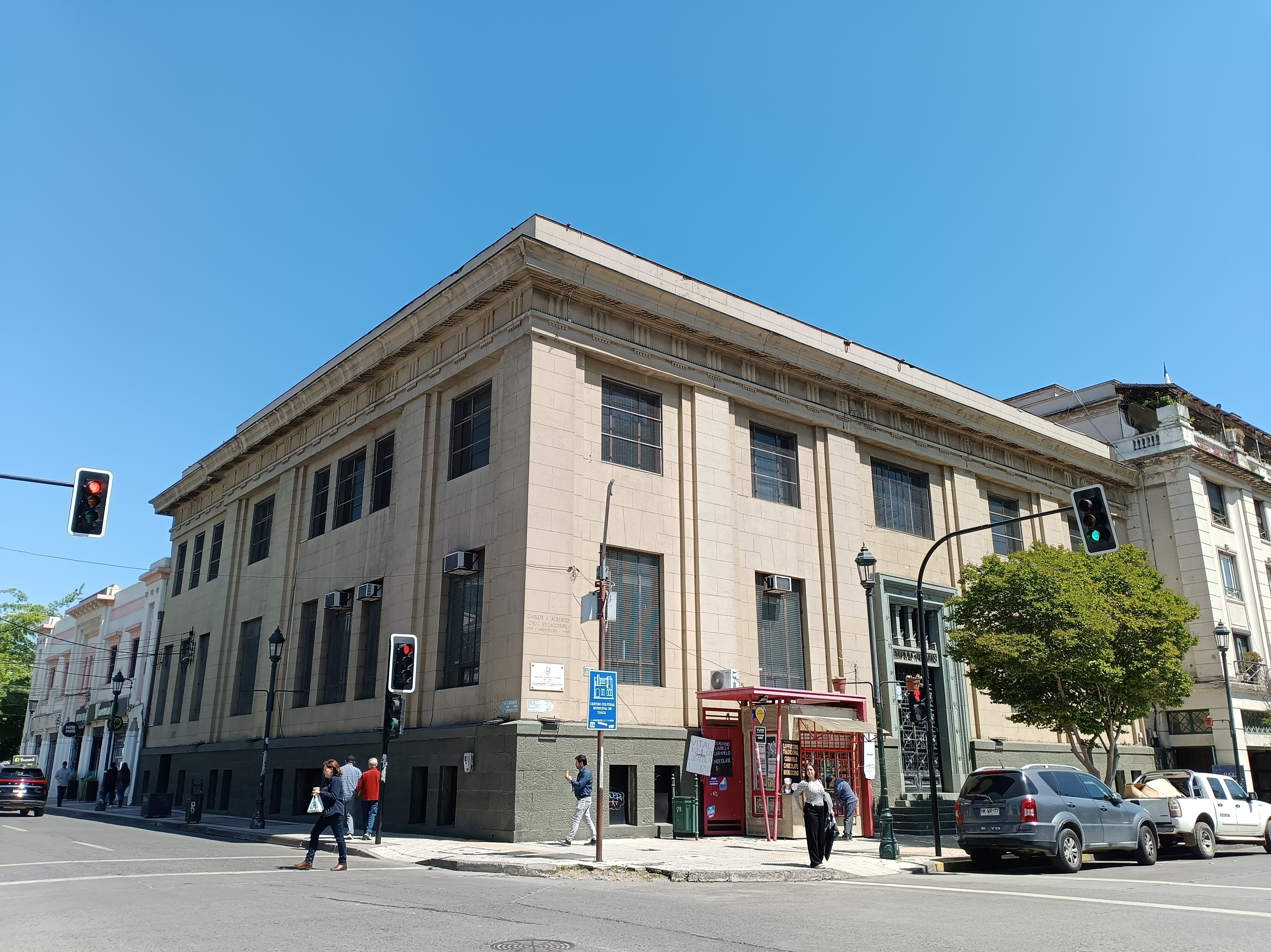
- Banco de Talca building between 1930 and 1982. It is currently occupied by the Local Prosecutor's Office of Talca.
- Successor: Centrobanco
- Formation: September 17, 1884; 142 years ago
- Dissolved: April 15, 1982; 44 years ago
- Legal status: Defunct
- Headquarters: Uno Sur 790, Talca
- Services: Banking

Banco de Talca (Bank of Talca) was a Chilean bank founded in 1884, whose headquarters were in the city of Talca. Most of its operations were concentrated in the Maule and Metropolitan regions. In 1981 it was intervened by the Government and liquidated the following year, due to the debts contracted by the institution and of which its board of directors was accused of fraud.

== History ==
=== Beginnings ===
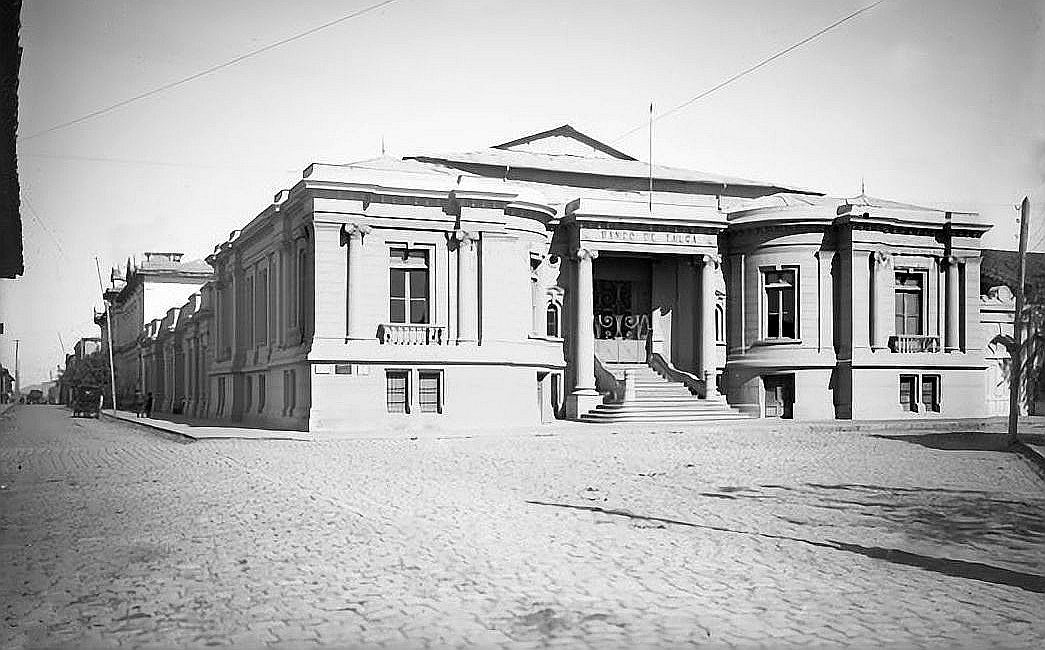
Banco de Talca branch building on Cauquenes until 1939

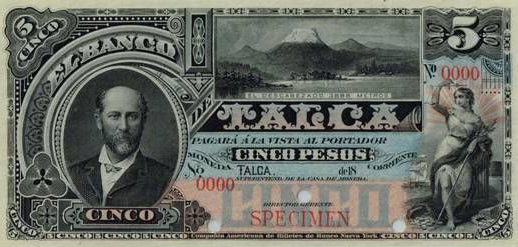
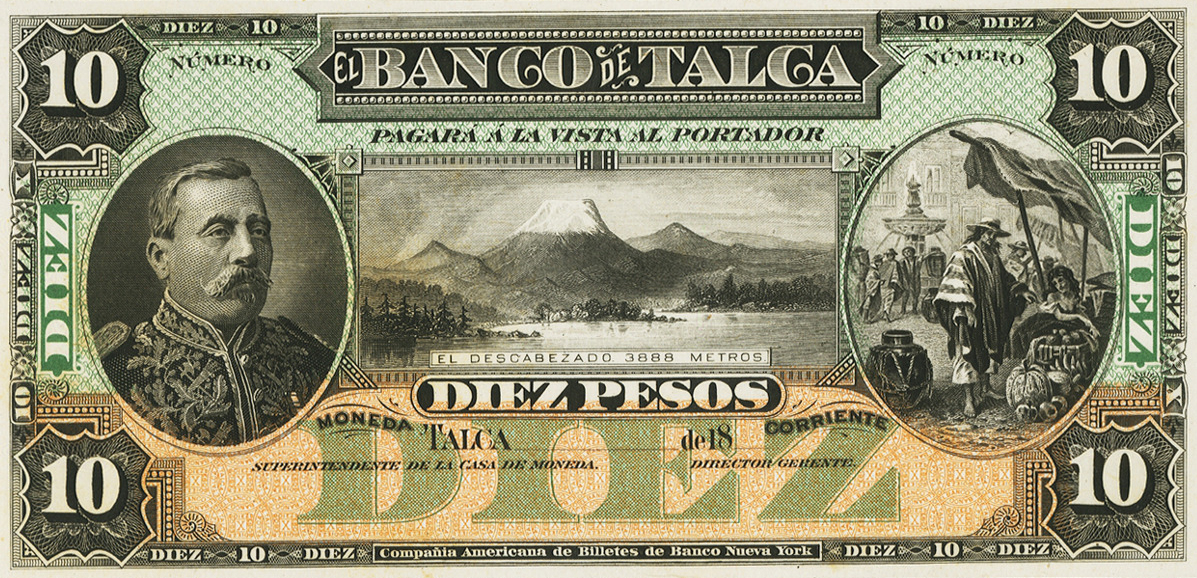
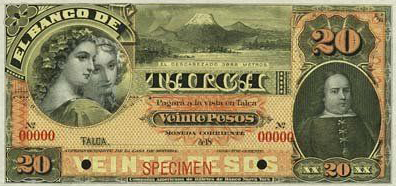
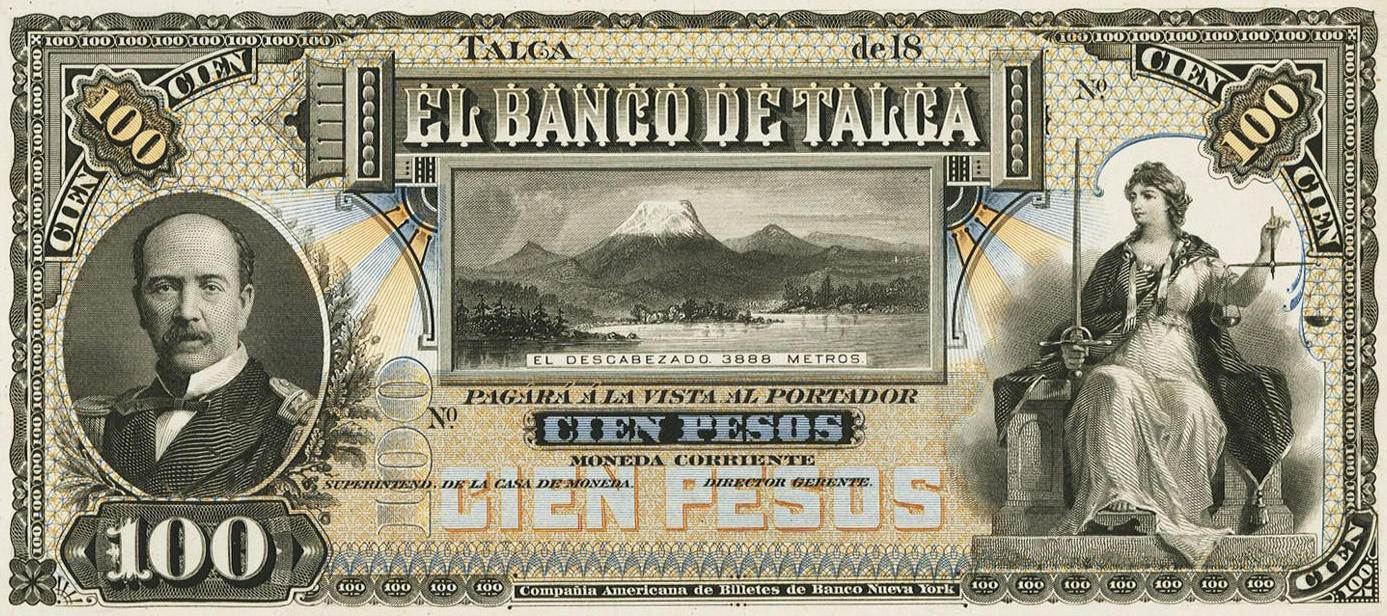
5, 10, 20 and 100 pesos banknotes issued by Banco de Talca.

Banco de Talca was officially constituted on September 17, 1884 with a capital of 1 million pesos of the time (issued by 2000 shares of 500 pesos each), a gigantic figure at that time, contributed by 32 men and 9 women of renown in the province. While its bylaws were approved by the Ministry of Finance on October 27 of the same year, on June 20, 1885 it was declared legally installed and it was set as the start date of operations on July 1 of the same year, opening its doors the next day. The first board of directors of the bank was made up of Jerónimo de la Cruz, Urcisino Opazo, José Manuel Fernández, Ruperto Echeverría, José Francisco Walton, Daniel Vergara and Ángel María Garcés.

On October 27, 1885, it opened his first branch in Cauquenes, later opening branches in Parral (September 1, 1888) and Linares (January 27, 1890). Like several banks of that time in Chile, Banco de Talca issued its own money, which was made through the printing of 5, 10, 20 and 100 peso notes; the first 5, 10 and 100 peso issues (made in 1885) included portraits of generals of the War of the Pacific, Benjamín Vicuña Mackenna and José Francisco Vergara, while the 20 pesos banknotes (made in 1888) carried the portrait of Tomás Marín de Poveda, founder of the city.

In 1893 the house that had belonged to Pedro José Jara at the corner of 1 Oriente and 1 Sur streets —where the bank was located since 1885— was demolished to build a new modern building, designed by Federico Thumm and whose construction was in charge of José Casali and Enrique Ohde, inaugurated in 1895.

=== Expansion and development ===
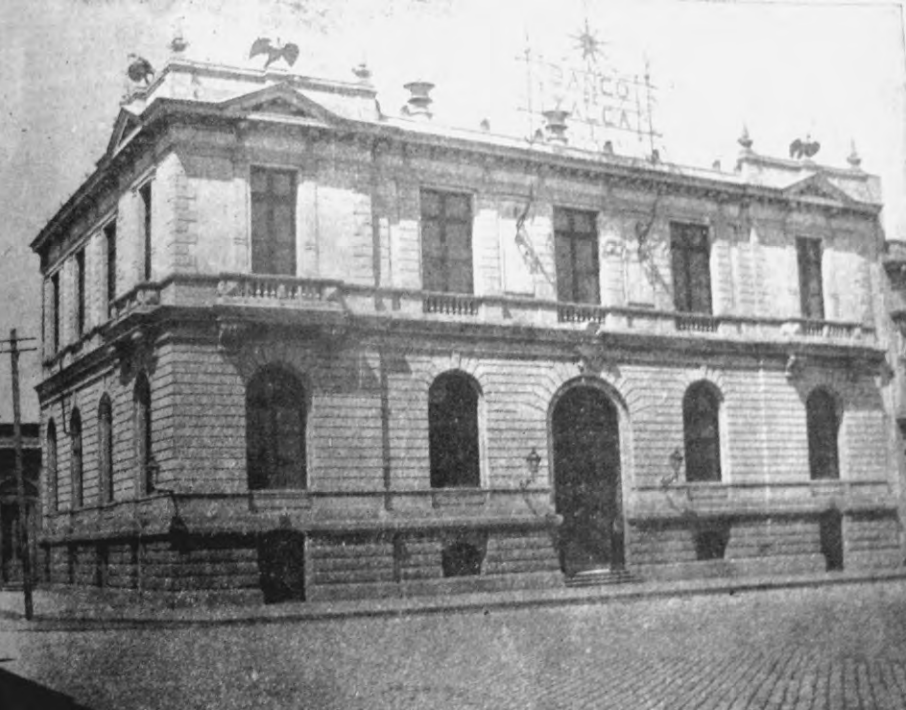
Banco de Talca building between 1895 and 1928

In the early 20th century the bank opened new branches in San Carlos (March 1906), Quirihue (opened in 1904 and closed in 1912) and San Javier (the latter in 1926, closed on September 11, 1931 and reopened in 1943). The earthquake of December 1, 1928 severely damaged the building of the bank, so the institution continued to serve in the side gardens of the city's Plaza de Armas while the management was kept in the underground of the destroyed building. Between February 1929 and April 1930 the headquarters were rebuilt, designed by the brothers Carlos and Alberto Cruz Eyzaguirre and built by the company Forteza Hermanos. The 1939 Chillán earthquake destroyed the Cauquenes branch, which was later rebuilt.

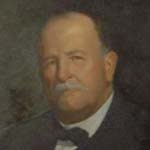
Pedro Opaso Letelier, president of Banco de Talca (1936-1957)

After the end of World War II —and under the management of Pedro Opaso Letelier, who took office of the bank presidency in 1936— a new process of expansion of the bank began, opening a new branch in Talca (in the neighbourhood called "Barrio Estación") in 1946, in Molina in 1947 and installing his first office in Santiago on July 1, 1958 after the Superintendence of Banks and Financial Institutions (SBIF) authorized it for that decision in April 1956. To this opening was added a branch in Constitución (December 1964) and three new branches in the Chilean capital: Arturo Prat (1964), Providencia (1965) and Diagonal Cervantes (1969).

Towards the end of the 1960s, some of the bank's shareholders were some entrepreneurs in the area, such as Aurelio Fernández Barros, Mario Villalobos Cruz, Víctor Opaso Cousiño, Miguel Calaf Rocosa, Enrique Tigero Caballero, Hernán Cruz Concha and Enrique Burgos Moreira.

For much of its history, the Banco de Talca was characterized for contributing to various advance works for the city and the province, such as the installation of the headquarters of the University of Chile in the city (1965), the creation and habilitation of the Museum of Huilquilemu (1975), sponsorship of exhibitions of Chilean painting, the construction of the Lircay Tower —first building of 15 floors in Talca— in 1975, and also granting financing for the preliminary studies and the later creation of the Corporation of Development of the Maule Region.

=== Nationalization and reprivatization ===
In 1971 the bank was expropriated by the State through the Corporation for the Promotion of Production (CORFO). The following year, it acquired all the assets that the First National City Bank agency owned in Chile, including the 6 branches of the US bank in Santiago (Bandera, Providencia, Estación, San Diego, San Antonio and 21 de Mayo), plus the two Valparaíso branches and the one that existed in Concepción. After the coup d'état of September 11, 1973, the military dictatorship initiated a process of reprivatization of banking; in November 1975, through a public tender, Corfo sold 89.5% of the capital of the Bank of Talca to 542 natural and legal persons of the Maule Region.

In March 1975, the Banco de Talca created a Department of Foreign Trade, where import and export procedures were handled, as well as providing technical reports on the subject. The following year he created an Agricultural Management, destined to deliver credits for this productive sector.

Since the mid-1970s, the bank began a new expansion process, opening branches in Iquique (September 30, 1976) —converting itself to official representatives of the Free Zone—, Arica (1977), Curicó (1977), Mercado-Centro in Talca (1977), Viña del Mar (1978), Antofagasta (1978), Faro de Apoquindo (1978) and Macul (1979), these last two in Santiago.

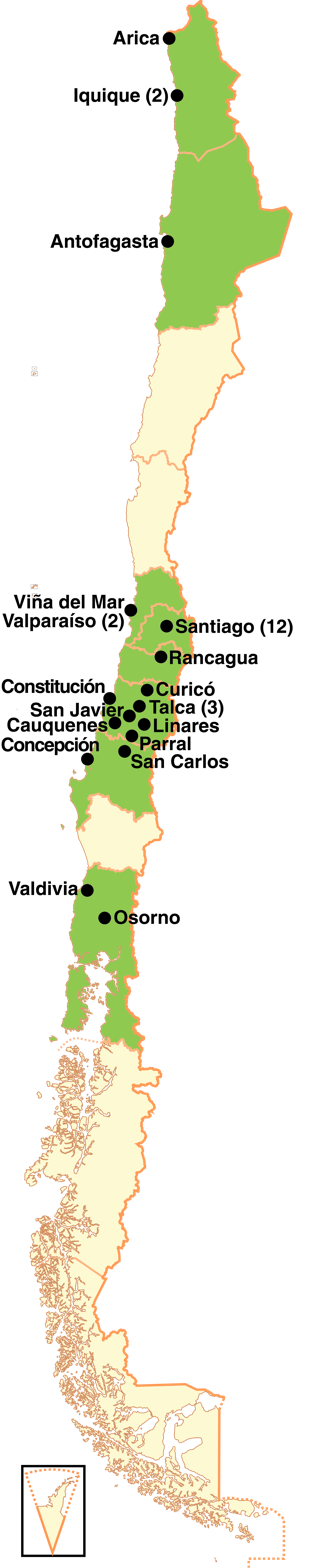
Banco de Talca branches at the moment of its sale (1982)

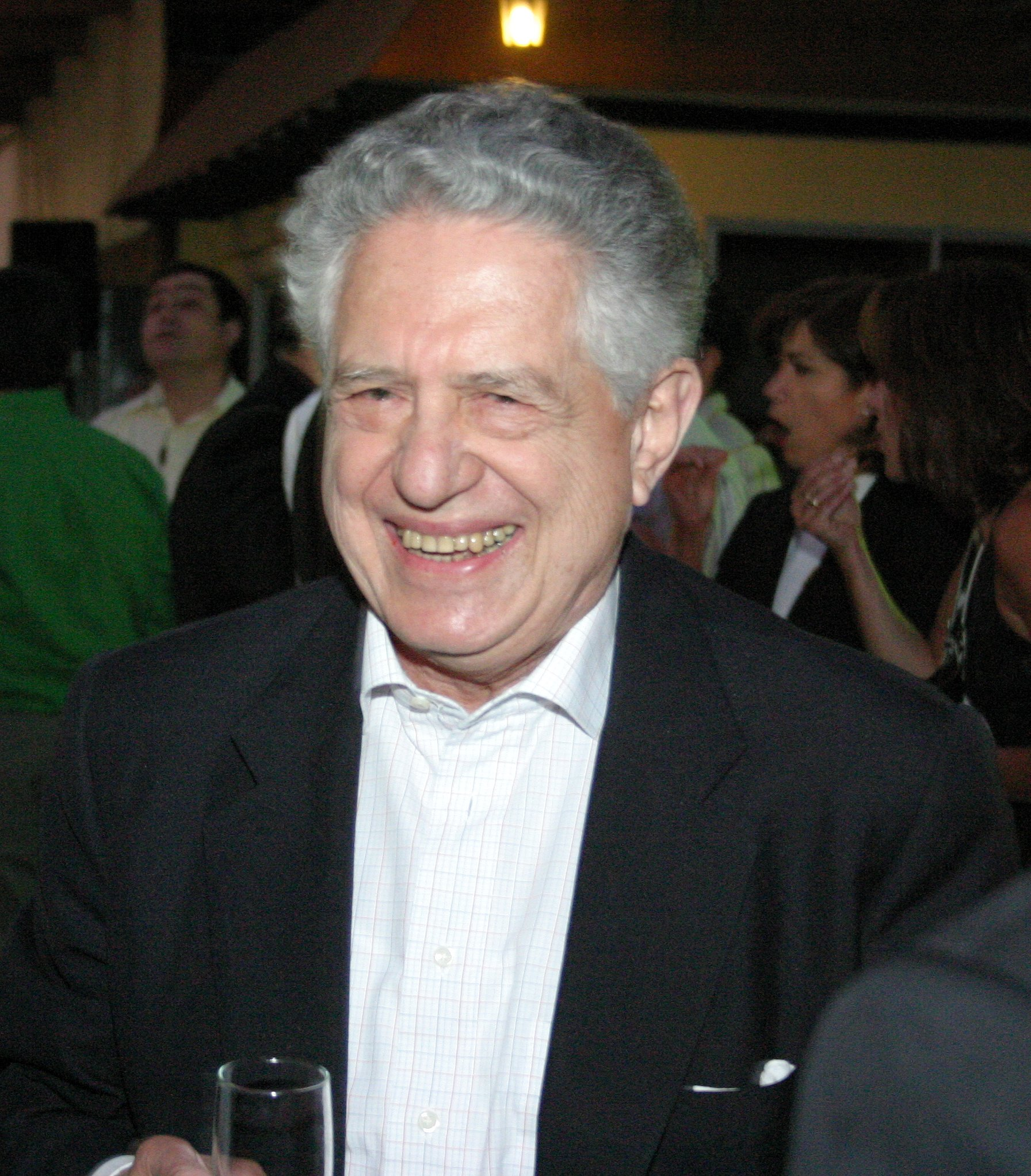
Carlos Massad, president of Banco de Talca (1979-1982)

In 1979, the Calaf-Danioni group acquired 65% of the ownership of the Banco de Talca. On April 19 of that year, Carlos Massad joined the board of directors —he was named president of the bank on June 22— and Sebastián Piñera was appointed general manager —who was replaced on November 1, 1980 by Emiliano Figueroa Sandoval—. The bank opened its last branches in Osorno, Universidad de Chile and Escuela Militar in 1980 —along with the remodeling of its branches in Ahumada, Curicó and Parral— and Rancagua, Valdivia and Orrego Luco in 1981.

During the late 1970s and early 1980s, the Banco de Talca introduced new products and services in its offices: in April 1979 it was one of the first banks in Chile to operate Visa credit cards for current accounts, and the following year it became the first Chilean bank to offer the International Visa card. In May 1980 it began to operate Savings Accounts for the Term and in that same year it restructured its Branch Division, creating 4 areas: North Area, V Region, Metropolitan Area and South Area, in order to decentralize the bank's operations. By December of that year the Banco de Talca had 33 offices (13 in Santiago and 20 in the rest of the country).

=== Intervention and settlement ===
The Ministry of Finance announced the intervention of the bank —as well as that of Banco Linares, Banco de Fomento de Valparaíso and Banco Español-Chile and the financial companies Cash, Compañía General Financiera, Financiera de Capitales and Finansur— on October 30, 1981, becoming effective on November 2 of the same year. Among the bank's main debtors at the time of its intervention were some companies of the same Calaf-Danioni group (Manufacturas Yarza SA, Calaf SACI, Cooperativa Agrícola y Forestal Copihue, Inversiones Río Claro, Agrícola y Forestal Los Quillayes, Forestal Las Cañas, Compañía de Consumidores de Gas de Talca, Inmobiliaria Las Terrazas de Providencia and Aceitera Talca) as well as other organizations, such as Envases del Pacífico, Envases Modernos, Comercial Importex, Banco de Fomento del Bío-Bío, Banco de Fomento de Valparaíso and Agroindustrias Talca.

The Bank of Talca was finally liquidated by the SBIF on April 15, 1982 and acquired by the Spanish bank Centrobanco —later called Central Hispano, whose capital belongs today to Banco Santander Chile— for a total of 17 billion pesos at the time. The bank also delivered part of the payment to the Central Bank of Chile for 115 paintings from its art gallery to settle a portion of its debts.

After its disappearance, several of the controllers of the Banco de Talca were prosecuted for fraud and infractions of the General Banking Law; on July 12, 1982, the interim administration of the bank in liquidation (appointed by the SBIF) filed a complaint against several executives: that same day Miguel Calaf and Alberto Danioni were arrested —they were declared inmates five days later— while on August 27 of the same year, Sebastián Piñera, Carlos Massad and Emiliano Figueroa Sandoval were convicted, their arrest warrants being annulled by the Supreme Court on September 20, after they filed a recurso de amparo and during that period they were not able to be located the authorities for his arrest.

=== 2009 political affair ===
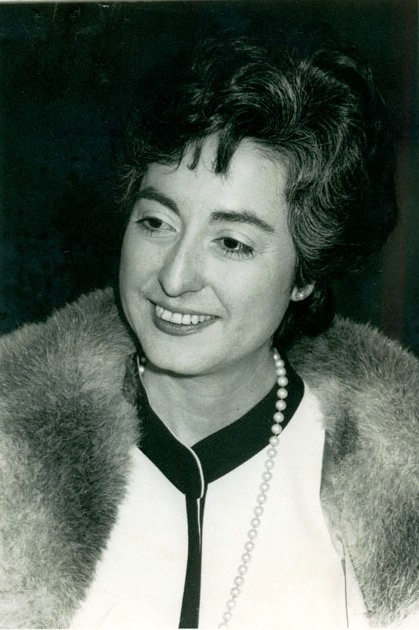
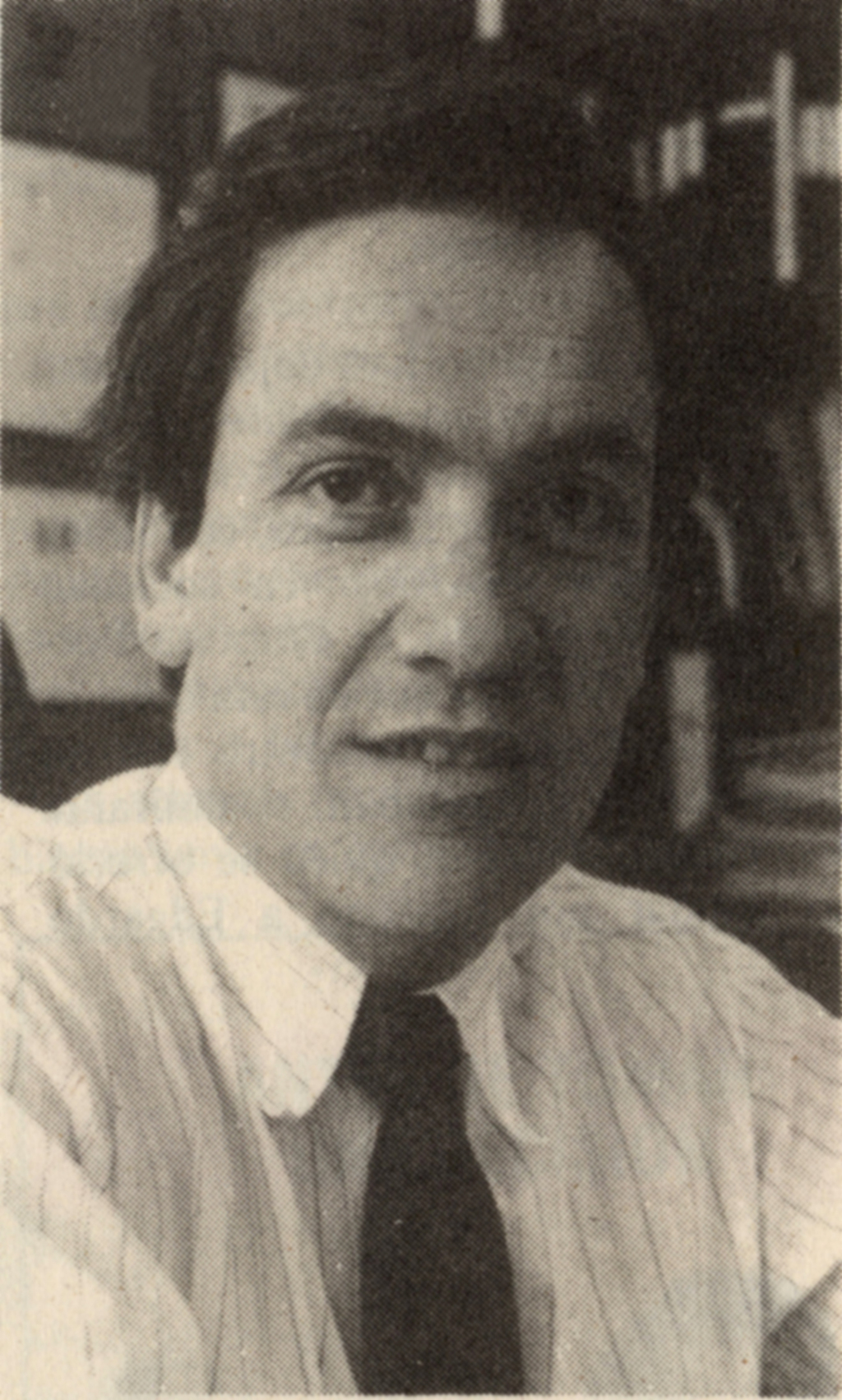
Mónica Madariaga and Sebastián Piñera

At the end of July 2009, the former Minister of Justice of the Pinochet regime, Mónica Madariaga, once again brought to light the bankruptcy of the Banco de Talca in an electoral environment, when Sebastián Piñera was running for president. These statements implied the crossing of opinions between different personalities. The press insisted on interviewing police, judges and politicians, although in the end the scandal was aimed at questioning the candidate's money in an environment close to the December 2009 election.

Sebastián Piñera, who has denied that he was a fugitive from justice, in his defense accused Detective Nelson Rivera, who tried to stop him in 1982, noting that the report the police had made was false. Rivera then filed a complaint against Piñera in the 8th Court of Guarantee of Santiago, which fixed a summons to the candidate for December 17 (days after the presidential election) to which Piñera did not attend because of "previous commitments" of his campaign agenda, motivating the protest of his opponents.

== Presidents ==
- Jerónimo de la Cruz (1884-1885)
- Manuel Fernández Carvallo (1885-1890)
- Urcisino Opazo Silva (1890-1898)
- Daniel Vergara Urzúa (1898-1904)
- Juan Esteban de la Cruz Concha (1904-1911)
- Pedro Letelier Silva (1911-1926)
- Jorge de la Cruz Concha (1926-1932)
- Federico Weston (1932-1936)
- Pedro Opaso Letelier (1936-1957)
- Santiago Vergara Lois (1957-1960)
- Aurelio Fernández Barros (1960-1971)
- Jorge Alvear Riquelme (1971-1972)
- Jaime Font Gabarró (1972)
- Marcos Rojas Cancino (1972-1973)
- Waldo López Strange (delegate manager, 1973-1976)
- Carlos Icaza Silva (1976-1979)
- Carlos Massad Abud (1979-1982)
