= Álvaro García Hurtado =

Chilean politician (born 1954)

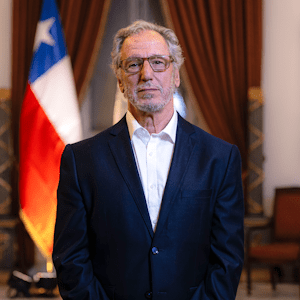

Minister of Energy
- In office 16 October 2025 – 11 March 2026
- President: Gabriel Boric
- Preceded by: Diego Pardow
- Succeeded by: Ximena Rincón

Minister of Economy, Development, and Tourism
- In office 21 August 2025 – 11 March 2026
- President: Gabriel Boric
- Preceded by: Nicolás Grau
- Succeeded by: Daniel Mas
- In office 5 January 1998 – 1 August 1998
- President: Eduardo Frei Ruíz-Tagle
- Preceded by: Alejandro Jadresic
- Succeeded by: Jorge Leiva Lavalle

Minister Secretary-General of the Presidency
- In office 11 March 2000 – 7 January 2002
- President: Ricardo Lagos
- Preceded by: José Miguel Insulza
- Succeeded by: Mario Fernández Baeza

Personal details
- Born: 22 March 1954 (age 72) Santiago, Chile
- Party: Popular Unitary Action Movement; Party for Democracy
- Spouse: Cecilia Dellacasa
- Children: Four
- Education: Pontifical Catholic University of Chile (B.Sc); University of Maryland (M.Sc); University of California, Berkeley (PhD)
- Profession: Economist

Álvaro Desiderio García Hurtado (born 22 March 1954) is a Chilean politician who has served as minister. From 2025 to 2026, he has been the Minister of Minister of Economy and the Minister of Energy of his country.

Between 2025 and 2026, he served as Minister of Economy, Development and Tourism, and from 16 October of the same year also as Minister of Energy, simultaneously holding both portfolios as a bi-minister of state under the administration of Gabriel Boric.

Previously, he served as Undersecretary of Planning and Cooperation (1990–1993), Minister of Economy (1994–1998), president minister of the National Energy Commission (1998), and Minister Secretary-General of the Presidency in successive governments of the Concertación coalition led by Patricio Aylwin, Eduardo Frei Ruiz-Tagle and Ricardo Lagos.

== Family and education ==
His father was Álvaro García Álamos, a long-time Christian Democratic Party activist who became general manager of the state-owned National Petroleum Company (ENAP), and his mother was Raquel Hurtado Torrealba.

He studied at Saint George’s College in Santiago and later pursued business administration at the Pontifical Catholic University of Chile. He subsequently completed a Master of Arts at the University of Maryland and a Ph.D. at the University of California, Berkeley, influenced academically by American economist Lovell Jarvis.

He is a naturist, a practitioner of yoga, and currently resides in El Arrayán, in the upper sector of the capital, together with his children—two from his first marriage, one from his second, and a daughter of his spouse—and his second wife, Argentine national Cecilia Dellacasa.

== Political career ==
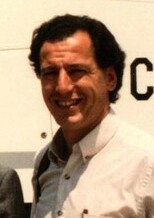
Álvaro García in 1993.

He is a member of the Party for Democracy (PPD). From the age of fifteen, he was active in the Popular Unitary Action Movement (MAPU) and later in Socialist Convergence.

He served as Undersecretary of Planning and Cooperation during the government of Patricio Aylwin between 1990 and 1993. He served as Minister of Economy from 1994 until 1998, when he submitted his resignation. He also held responsibilities in the energy sector between 5 January and 31 July 1998.

After leaving the ministry, he worked at the Chile 21 Foundation as vice-president and participated in the presidential campaign of Ricardo Lagos. He was later appointed by the president-elect as Minister Secretary-General of the Presidency, assuming office on 11 March 2000.

Following his departure from the ministry in 2002, he worked as a corporate executive, including as president of the insurance company Le Mans, a subsidiary of the Inverlink group. The conglomerate later became involved in a major financial scandal that broke in 2003, involving fraud against the Central Bank of Chile and the Production Development Corporation (CORFO). Although he was not involved, he was tried and ultimately acquitted.

In August 2004, he was appointed ambassador of Chile to Sweden.

He later participated in the 2008 Chilean municipal election as a candidate for mayor of Cerro Navia in Santiago.
