= María Elena Carrera =

Chilean politician (1929–2026)

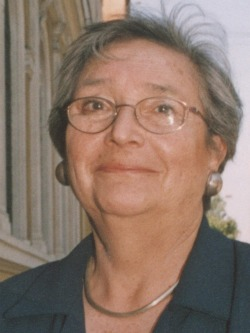

Member of the Senate of Chile
- In office 11 March 1994 – 11 March 1998
- Preceded by: Eduardo Frei Ruíz-Tagle
- Succeeded by: Alejandro Foxley
- Constituency: 8th Circunscription
- In office 15 May 1969 – 21 September 1973
- Preceded by: Eduardo Frei Ruíz-Tagle
- Succeeded by: 1973 military coup
- Constituency: 5th Provincial Grouping

Personal details
- Born: 2 January 1929 Santiago, Chile
- Died: 22 May 2026 (aged 97)
- Party: Socialist Party
- Spouse: Salomón Corbalán (m. 1948; died 1967)
- Children: 3
- Parent(s): Luis Carrera Smith; Inés Villavicencio
- Relatives: José Miguel Carrera (great-great-grandfather)
- Education: University of Concepción (no degree); University of Chile (B.Sc, 1955)
- Occupation: Politician
- Profession: Physician

María Elena Carrera Villavicencio (2 January 1929 – 22 May 2026) was a Chilean physician and politician who served as a member of the Senate of Chile.

== Life and career ==
=== Background ===
María Elena Carrera Villavicencio was born in Santiago on 2 January 1929. She was the daughter of Luis Carrera Smith and Inés Villavicencio Arancibia; her father worked as an official at the Ministry of Public Works. She came from a historically influential family, being a great-great-granddaughter of General José Miguel Carrera and a great-niece of Captain Ignacio Carrera Pinto, a hero of the Battle of La Concepción.

She married former senator Salomón Corbalán, who served twice as Secretary General of the Socialist Party of Chile. They had three children: Patricio, Alejandra, and Andrés. Carrera died on 22 May 2026, at the age of 97.

=== Professional career ===
Carrera completed her primary education at Liceo de Niñas No. 1 in Santiago and her secondary studies at the Girls’ High Schools of Concepción and Osorno. She studied Medicine at the University of Concepción, where she was taught by Edgardo Enríquez Frödden. She completed her final clinical years at Hospital del Salvador and at the University of Chile in Santiago. Her medical thesis addressed the “Causes of Prematurity,” and she obtained her degree as a physician and surgeon on 23 November 1955.

After graduating, she worked as a pediatrician at the Child Psychiatry Clinic of the University of Chile, at Hospital Luis Calvo Mackenna, and at Sanatorio Pedro Aguirre Cerda between 1958 and 1964. She later specialized in neuropsychiatry, working at San Juan de Dios Hospital and Félix Bulnes Hospital between 1964 and 1967.

During her professional career, she published academic studies such as “Some Causes of Prematurity” (1957) and “A Study on Enuresis” (1960). She served as a physician within the National Health Service and participated in the Chilean Pediatric Academy.

== Political career ==
Carrera began her political involvement during her university years under the government of President Gabriel González Videla, joining the Socialist University Brigade at the University of Concepción and later the Socialist Youth at the University of Chile. During this period, she opposed the Law for the Permanent Defense of Democracy and budget cuts affecting higher education institutions.

After graduating, she became a grassroots leader and later a member of the Ñuñoa branch of the Socialist Party of Chile, establishing close ties with party leaders such as Clodomiro Almeyda, Aniceto Rodríguez, Carlos Altamirano, and Raúl Ampuero. In 1962, she traveled for one month to Cuba with a group of professionals to observe the Cuban Revolution. Between 1963 and 1964, she served as a national leader in the presidential campaign of Salvador Allende.

During her years as a parliamentarian, she headed the Socialist National Agrarian Commission (CONAS) until 1971, focusing on training leaders and organizing agricultural workers’ unions throughout the country to implement agrarian reform policies. In 1971, she was appointed president of the Women of the Popular Unity coalition, and in October 1972 she founded and chaired the Patriotic Women’s Front.

In 1973, she went into exile while her children remained in Chile; her eldest son was imprisoned at the Chacabuco detention camp. After nine months in Peru and four months in Cuba, she settled for fourteen years in the German Democratic Republic (East Germany). There, she continued her political work as president of Chilean Women in Exile, an organization with representation in 35 countries. As part of the solidarity movement with Chile, she traveled extensively across Europe, North America, and Oceania. During her exile, she pursued postgraduate studies in Public Health in Havana and Berlin.

She returned clandestinely to Chile in May 1988. After her return, she studied at the Systemic Family Therapy Center in Santiago and became involved in the Women’s Organization of the Concertación coalition.
