= Mónica Madariaga =

Chilean lawyer, academic, and politician

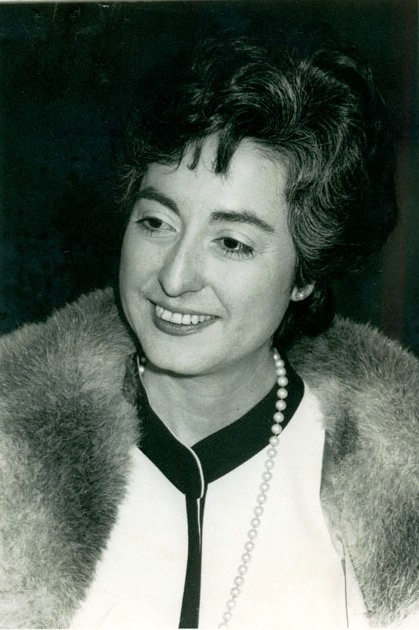
- Mónica Madariaga in 1983

Minister of Education of Chile
- In office 14 February 1983 – 18 October 1983
- President: Augusto Pinochet
- Preceded by: Álvaro Arriagada Norambuena
- Succeeded by: Horacio Aránguiz Donoso

Minister of Justice of Chile
- In office 20 April 1977 – 14 February 1983
- President: Augusto Pinochet
- Preceded by: Renato Damilano Bonfante
- Succeeded by: Jaime del Valle Alliende

Personal details
- Born: Mónica Madariaga Gutiérrez; 25 January 1942 Santiago, Chile
- Died: 8 October 2009 (aged 67) Las Condes, Chile
- Party: Union of the Centrist Center; Independent Democratic Union
- Education: University of Chile
- Occupation: Lawyer

Mónica Madariaga Gutiérrez (25 January 1942 – 8 October 2009) was a Chilean lawyer, academic, and politician, a state minister of the military dictatorship headed by her cousin, Augusto Pinochet, which ruled the country from 1973 to 1990.

== Biography ==
The daughter of Carlos Madariaga Pizarro and Laura Gutiérrez Ugarte, and granddaughter of a Chilean Army general, Mónica Madariaga studied with the Ursulines Nuns, at the Colegio Compañía de María, and at Liceo 7 in Providencia. She entered the law school of the University of Chile and graduated in 1966 with the thesis Derecho administrativo y seguridad jurídica (Administrative Law and Legal Security).

She worked at the office of the Comptroller General from 1962 to 1977.

When Augusto Pinochet headed the military junta, she was appointed Minister of Justice, serving from 1977 and 1983. At this time the Constitution of 1980, as well as Decree Law 2.191, better known as the Amnesty Law – which was drafted by Madariaga herself – were enacted.

Mónica Madariaga apologized in an interview granted in 1985 to the journalist Mónica González for the magazine Análisis, claiming to have lived in a "micro-reality" that did not allow her to see what was really happening in the country with regard to human rights violations. At the same time she blamed Jaime Guzmán and José Piñera for some of their actions.

After the country's return to democracy, she became the rector of Andrés Bello University. She was a Union of the Centrist Center candidate for senator for O'Higgins Region in the 1997 parliamentary election, but received 16.65% of votes and was not elected. Later she was director of the Law School of the University UNIACC.

From 2001 to 2003, she was active in the Independent Democratic Union (UDI).

== Death ==
In 2004, Mónica Madariaga contracted an aggressive form of bone and breast cancer, which was initially contained, but then returned and metastasized to her lymphatic system. She died from cancer at 6:00 a.m. on 8 October 2009 at her home in the municipality of Las Condes.

== Controversies ==
Mónica Madariaga was characterized by her strong personality, frank character, and divisive revelations and statements, which landed her in several controversies in the press.

She was a frequent guest on television programs precisely because of her openness to unveiling some episodes of the military regime, such as indicating the great influence that Lucía Hiriart exerted on her husband.

She caused a stir when, in an interview with the newspaper La Tercera in 2000, she affirmed that the leaders of the rightist UDI were indoctrinated in Colonia Dignidad.

In 2009 she returned to the public spotlight by affirming, in an interview with Canal 2 of San Antonio, that in 1982 she interceded to free Sebastián Piñera, then general manager of the Banco de Talca, from his imprisonment for fraud and infractions to the General Bank Law. Piñera denied the accusations, but Madariaga reaffirmed her statements, calling the Coalition for Change's presidential candidate a "liar".
