= Soledad Alvear =

Chilean politician (born 1950)

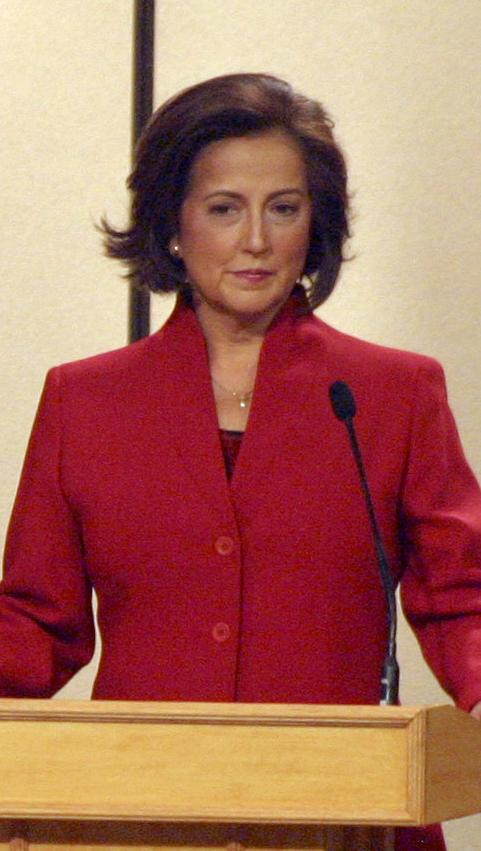
- Soledad Alvear (2005)

Member of the Senate
- In office 11 March 2006 – 11 March 2014
- Preceded by: Alejandro Foxley
- Succeeded by: Carlos Montes Cisternas
- Constituency: Santiago Oriente (8th Circumscription)

President of the Christian Democratic Party
- In office 2006–2008
- Preceded by: Andrés Zaldívar
- Succeeded by: Jorge Burgos

Foreign Affairs Minister of Chile
- In office 11 March 2000 – 1 October 2004
- President: Ricardo Lagos
- Preceded by: Juan Gabriel Valdés
- Succeeded by: Ignacio Walker

Minister of Justice
- In office 11 March 1994 – 16 December 1999
- President: Eduardo Frei Ruíz-Tagle
- Preceded by: Francisco Cumplido
- Succeeded by: José Antonio Gómez

Head Ministry of the National Women's Service
- In office 3 January 1991 – 11 March 1994
- President: Patricio Aylwin
- Preceded by: Creation of the Office
- Succeeded by: Josefina Bilbao

Personal details
- Born: 17 September 1950 (age 75) Santiago, Chile
- Party: Christian Democratic Party; Amarillos por Chile
- Spouse: Gutenberg Martínez
- Education: University of Chile (LL.B)
- Profession: Lawyer

María Soledad Alvear Valenzuela (born September 17, 1950) is a Chilean lawyer and former Christian Democrat politician, who was a cabinet member of the Aylwin, Frei and Lagos administrations. She was president of the Christian Democrat Party (PDC) from 2006 to 2008.

In 2022, she joined Amarillos por Chile, a centrist political movement.

== Early life and education ==
Alvear was born on 17 September 1950. She is the daughter of journalist Ernesto Alvear and María Teresa Valenzuela. Her father worked for the newspaper La Nación, was an executive at CMPC, and was one of the organizers of the 1962 FIFA World Cup. She is the sister of María Teresa Alvear, who served as a municipal councilor of Puente Alto between 2009 and 2012.

She is married to lawyer Gutenberg Martínez, a prominent member of the Christian Democratic Party and former deputy, and has three children: Carlos, Gutenberg, and Claudia.

She completed her primary education at Liceo No. 1 Javiera Carrera in Santiago and later entered the Faculty of Law of the University of Chile. She obtained her law degree with a thesis titled Legal Mechanisms Enabling Participation in Chile and qualified as a lawyer on 26 July 1976.

Between 1973 and 1975, she completed a degree in Development Sciences at the Latin American Institute for Development and Social Studies (ILADES), later validated by the Catholic University of Leuven in Belgium.

== Professional career ==
Alvear began her professional career at the Cooperative Financing Institute (IFICOOP Ltd.) and the financial firm FINTESA between 1973 and 1975. From 1978 to 1990, she ran her own law practice. In 1990, she served as a consultant for the Food and Agriculture Organization of the United Nations (FAO).

She was also a professor of Civil Law at the University of Chile and served on the Governing Council of Alberto Hurtado University. In April 2014, she joined the board of directors of Chilean television network Canal 13. Since 2015, she has been a member of the External Advisory Council of the UC Center for International Studies (CIEUC).

== Political career ==
Alvear joined the Youth Wing of the Christian Democratic Party at the age of 17 and held various leadership roles during her years of party membership.

In 1988, she worked on the No campaign in the national plebiscite and later joined the presidential campaign of Patricio Aylwin. Following the return to democracy, she became head of the National Women's Office (ONAM) and later served as the first Minister of the newly created National Women's Service (SERNAM) between 1991 and 1994. During her tenure, she launched a national equal opportunities plan and promoted legislation against domestic violence.

During the administration of President Eduardo Frei Ruiz-Tagle, Alvear served as Minister of Justice from 1994 until late 1999. In that role, she led a comprehensive reform of Chile's judicial system, including the establishment of a new criminal procedure system, the creation of Family Courts, and the enactment of the Law on Filiação, which eliminated legal distinctions between children born within and outside marriage.

In March 2000, President Ricardo Lagos appointed her Minister of Foreign Affairs. She served until 2004, becoming the first woman to hold that office in Chile. During her tenure, Chile signed free trade agreements with the United States, South Korea, and the European Union, deployed a peace mission to Haiti, and played an active role as a non-permanent member of the United Nations Security Council. In 2003, Chile voted against a United States–led military intervention in Iraq.

Alvear chaired and presided over multiple international forums, including the Rio Group, the Human Security Network, the Organization of American States General Assembly (2003), and APEC Chile 2004. She also presided over the UN Security Council in January 2004.

In 2004, she resigned as foreign minister to seek the Christian Democratic Party's presidential nomination for the 2005 elections, withdrawing from the race in May 2005. In the 2005 parliamentary elections, she was elected senator for the 8th Senatorial District (Metropolitan Region East), serving from 2006 to 2014 and obtaining the highest vote share with 582,117 votes (43.81%).

In 2006, she was elected president of the Christian Democratic Party, becoming the first woman to lead the party, and served until 2008. She ran for re-election to the Senate in 2013 but was not elected.

In April 2018, Alvear resigned from the Christian Democratic Party after fifty years of membership. She subsequently founded the political movement Comunidad en Movimiento. In May 2018, she was appointed to the National Agreement Table for Comprehensive Development convened by President Sebastián Piñera.

Between 2019 and 2020, she promoted centrist political alliances through agreements with Progresismo con Progreso. She later joined Amarillos por Chile in September 2022, remaining in the movement until June 2025.

On 23 May 2023, Alvear was elected president of the Honor Tribunal of the National Professional Football Association (ANFP).
