= Javiera Montes Cruz =

Chilean politician (1973 – 2025)

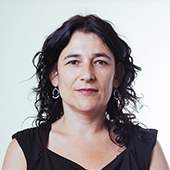
- Born: November 28, 1973; Santiago de Chile, Chile
- Died: February 12, 2025 (aged 51); Santiago de Chile, Chile
- Occupations: Geographer and Politician
- Predecessor: Daniel Pardo López
- Political party: Socialist Party of Chile (PS)
- Spouse: Juan Manuel Sánchez Medioli
- Children: 2
- Parent(s): Carlos Montes Cisternas; Gloria Josefina Cruz Domínguez

Javiera Montes Cruz (28 November 1973 –12 February 2025) was a Chilean geographer and politician, a member of the Socialist Party of Chile (PS). She served as undersecretary of Tourism under the second government of Michele Bachelet (2014–2018).

== Biography ==
Montes Cruz was a daughter of Chilean politician Carlos Montes Cisternas, a former senator and Minister of Housing and Urban Development, and Gloria Josefina Cruz Domínguez.

=== Education ===
Montes Cruz earned a degree in geography from Pontificial Catholic University of Chile (PUC) and held a master's degree in Urban Project Management from the University of Milan.

=== Professional career ===
In June 2005, Montes Cruz joined the National Tourism Service, becoming the regional director of the Bíobío Region. In 2007, she became the deputy director of regions for the Tourism Service, and then the following year she became the deputy director of Development for Sernatur.

In March 2014, she was appointed the Undersecretary of Tourism by President Michelle Bachelet. In her role, she sought to champion increasing tourism to the country, and encouraging visitors to venture beyond the country's most well known sites, Torres de Paine, the Atacama Desert and Easter Island. Montes Cruz also represented Chile in signing a declaration with other government representatives to collaborate on visa reciprocity for tourism in the region. She held the position until the end of government in March 2018.

=== Later life ===
After leaving government, Montes Cruz worked as an advisor and tourism consultant. In March 2019, she joined the Chilean Gastronomy Association as a general manager. Montes Cruz died on 12 February 2025 at 51 years old. At the time the cause of her death was reportedly from illness.
