= Gutenberg Martínez =

Chilean politician

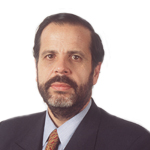

President of the Christian Democrat Organization of America
- In office 4 April 1998 – 23 November 2006
- Preceded by: Miguel Ángel Rodríguez
- Succeeded by: Miguel Espino

President of the Christian Democratic Party
- In office 5 July 1999 – 7 February 2000
- Preceded by: Enrique Krauss
- Succeeded by: Ricardo Hormazábal
- In office 3 May 1993 – 23 July 1994
- Preceded by: Eduardo Frei Ruíz-Tagle
- Succeeded by: Alejandro Foxley

President of the Chamber of Deputies
- In office 19 September 1996 – 11 March 1999
- Preceded by: Jaime Estévez
- Succeeded by: Carlos Montes

Member of the Chamber of Deputies
- In office 11 March 1990 – 11 March 2002
- Preceded by: District created
- Succeeded by: Jorge Burgos
- Constituency: 21st District (Providencia and Ñuñoa)

Personal details
- Born: 29 August 1950 (age 75) Santiago, Chile
- Party: Christian Democratic Party (1964−2018); Amarillos por Chile
- Spouse: Soledad Alvear
- Children: Three
- Education: Liceo de Aplicación
- Alma mater: University of Chile
- Occupation: Politician
- Profession: Lawyer

Gutenberg Alejandro Martínez Ocamica (born 29 August 1950) is a Chilean politician who served as President of the Chamber of Deputies and as a member of the Chamber of Deputies, representing District 21 of Santiago.

In the private sector, he provided professional services to institutions focused on the development of cooperatives and small and medium-sized enterprises. He also worked in academia, serving as professor in the Extension Program of the Faculty of Law at the University of Chile (1973–1974) and as lecturer in Introduction to Law in the Public Administration program at the University of Santiago, Chile (from 1992).

He was academic coordinator of the Instituto Chileno de Estudios Humanísticos (ICHEH). Since 2010, he has served as Rector of the Universidad Miguel de Cervantes.

== Biography ==
He was born on 29 August 1950, the son of Gutenberg Martínez Klein and Victoria Ocamica Jara, and the grandson of Carlos Alberto Martínez. He is married to María Soledad Alvear, with whom he has three children.

He completed his primary education at Colegio San Lázaro and his secondary studies at the Liceo de Aplicación. He studied law at the University of Chile, qualifying as a lawyer.

== Political career ==
He joined the Christian Democratic Party (DC) in 1964 through the secondary nucleus of the party's youth wing at the Liceo de Aplicación. In 1966, he became head of secondary education for the party and the following year was elected vice president of the Federación de Estudiantes Secundarios (FESES).

During his university years, he continued his political involvement. In 1969, he was appointed head of the Christian Democratic University Group (DCU) and student representative to the Faculty Council of Legal Sciences. A year later, he was elected to the university's Superior Council and served on its governing committee, while also becoming first vice president of the party's youth wing (JDC).

Between 1974 and 1977, he was elected national president of the JDC and in 1975 assumed the same position for the JDC of Latin America. After graduating, in 1978 he joined the party's Political Commission. He later served as national councillor (1982), vice president (1985), and national secretary (1987–1989) of the DC.

In 1990, he was appointed first national vice president of the party (until 1992) and that same year served as campaign manager for the municipal elections. In 1993, he directed the campaign for the Concertación primaries that selected the presidential candidate for 1994.

He served twice as president of the DC: from 31 May 1993 to 23 July 1994, and from 11 June 1999 to 7 February 2000. As a Christian Democrat, he also presided over the Organization of Christian Democrats of America (ODCA) from 1998 to 2006.

On 28 April 2018, he announced his resignation from the Christian Democratic Party. In September 2022, he joined Amarillos por Chile. He left that movement on 6 June 2025 following its support for the presidential candidacy of Evelyn Matthei.
