= Alejandro Foxley =

Chilean economist and politician

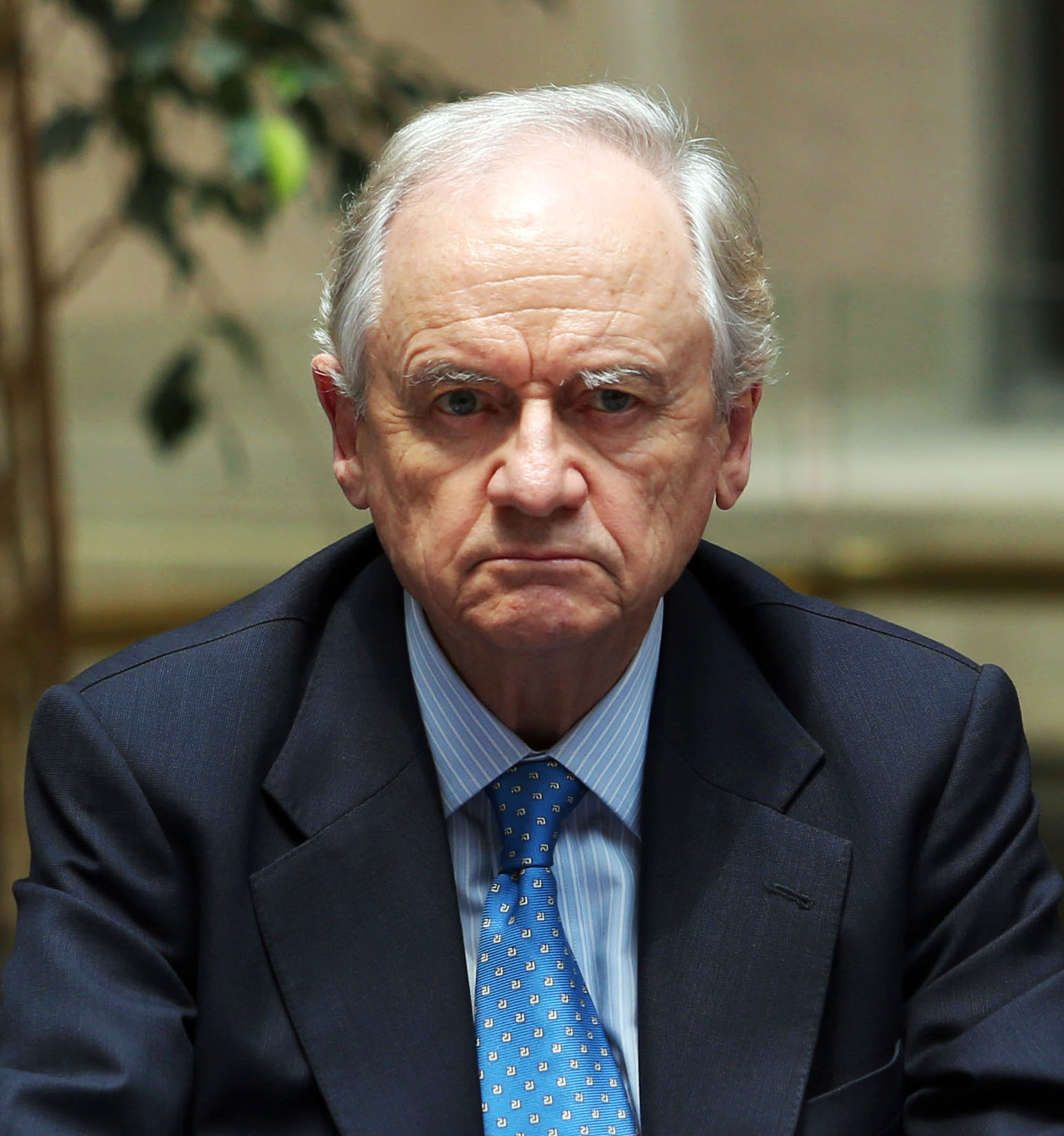
- Foxley in 2016

Minister of Foreign Affairs
- In office 11 March 2006 – 12 March 2009
- Appointed by: Michelle Bachelet
- Preceded by: Ignacio Walker
- Succeeded by: Mariano Fernández

Member of the Senate
- In office 11 March 1998 – 12 March 2006
- Preceded by: María Elena Carrera
- Succeeded by: Soledad Alvear
- Constituency: 8th Circunscription

President of the Christian Democratic Party
- In office 1994–1996
- Preceded by: Gutenberg Martínez
- Succeeded by: Enrique Krauss

Minister of Finance
- In office 11 March 1990 – 12 March 1994
- President: Patricio Aylwin
- Preceded by: Martín Costabal
- Succeeded by: Eduardo Aninat

Personal details
- Born: 26 May 1939 (age 87) Viña del Mar, Chile
- Education: Pontifical Catholic University of Valparaíso (B.Sc); University of Wisconsin–Madison (PhD)

Alejandro Tomás Foxley Rioseco (born 26 May 1939 in Viña del Mar) is a Chilean economist and politician. He was the Foreign Minister of Chile from 2006 to 2009 and previously served as Minister of Finance from 1990 to 1994 and leader of the Christian Democrat Party from 1994 to 1996.

== Education and personal life ==
Foxley received a Chemical Engineering degree from the Catholic University of Valparaíso and PhD in Economics from the University of Wisconsin–Madison. Over his life he has received various awards including three honorary doctorates, the Great Insignia of Honor from Austria, the Ordem Nacional Cruzeiro do Sul from Brazil and the Order of Civil Merit from the King of Spain.

Foxley is married to Gisela Tapia Soko with two children and four grandchildren.

== Economist and writer ==
Foxley has taught at various universities including the University of Sussex in 1973, Oxford University in 1975, Massachusetts Institute of Technology in 1978, University of California, Berkeley in 1981, University of California, San Diego in 1985 and the University of Notre Dame. He has written thirteen books on economics and the problems of democracy.

== Political career ==
Foxley was appointed to the first Chilean cabinet after the restoration of democracy by Patricio Aylwin. He served as Minister of Finance from 1990 to 1994 and is regarded as one of the architects of the strong economic growth of the period. As Finance Minister he was also a governor of the Inter-American Development Bank and the World Bank. Following his period as Finance Minister Foxley was elected leader of the Christian Democrat Party in 1994, serving until 1996.

In 1998 Foxley was elected a member of the Senate of Chile for Santiago East. In the Senate he was the Chairman of the Finance Committee for four years until he stood down from the Senate in 2006. During his period in the Senate he was seen as a possible Presidential candidate but backed the candidacy of Michelle Bachelet in the Presidential election. Bachelet appointed him as Foreign Minister in March 2006 following her victory in the election. In March 2009 Foxley resigned as Foreign Minister for personal reasons and to pursue other interests. Today he is a member of Washington D.C.–based think tank, the Inter-American Dialogue.
