= Sigdo Koppers =

Chilean industrial conglomerate

Sigdo Koppers S.A.
- Company type: Sociedad Anónima
- Traded as: BCS: SK
- Industry: Conglomerate
- Founded: 1960
- Headquarters: Santiago, Chile
- Key people: Juan Eduardo Errázuriz (Executive President); Juan Pablo Aboitiz Domínguez (General Manager)
- Products: Industrial services Construction; Transport & logistics Machinery & automotive distribution Mining and energy-related products
- Revenue: US$2.7 billion (2012); US$4.99 billion (2023)
- Net income: US$141 million (2012); US$543 million EBITDA (2023)
- Number of employees: 10,783 (2023)
- Website: Official website

Sigdo Koppers S.A. (SK) is a Chilean multinational industrial conglomerate founded in 1960 and headquartered in Santiago, Chile. It operates through subsidiaries and business units across the Americas, Europe, Asia, Africa, and Oceania.

== History ==
Sigdo Koppers was founded in 1960 under the name Ingeniería y Construcción Sigdo Koppers S.A. to provide industrial construction and engineering services. Over time, the company diversified into mining services, logistics, automotive distribution, and industrial manufacturing.

SK expanded internationally during the 2000s and 2010s, acquiring companies such as Enaex (industrial explosives), Magotteaux (grinding media and wear parts), and SKC (automotive and machinery distribution).

== Operations ==
Sigdo Koppers' business is organized into three main areas:

- Services: Industrial construction, assembly, and engineering; transport and logistics.
- Industrial: Rock fragmentation, grinding media and wear parts, and chemical products through subsidiaries including Enaex and Magotteaux.
- Commercial and Automotive: Machinery representation, vehicle distribution and leasing, and related services under the SKC brand.

The group operates in over 100 countries across five continents, providing products and services primarily to the mining, energy, and infrastructure sectors.

== Financial performance ==
As of 2023, the company reported consolidated assets of approximately US$4.99 billion and an EBITDA of US$543 million.

== Corporate governance ==
Sigdo Koppers is led by Executive President Juan Eduardo Errázuriz and General Manager Juan Pablo Aboitiz Domínguez.
