= Jorge Marshall =

Chilean politician

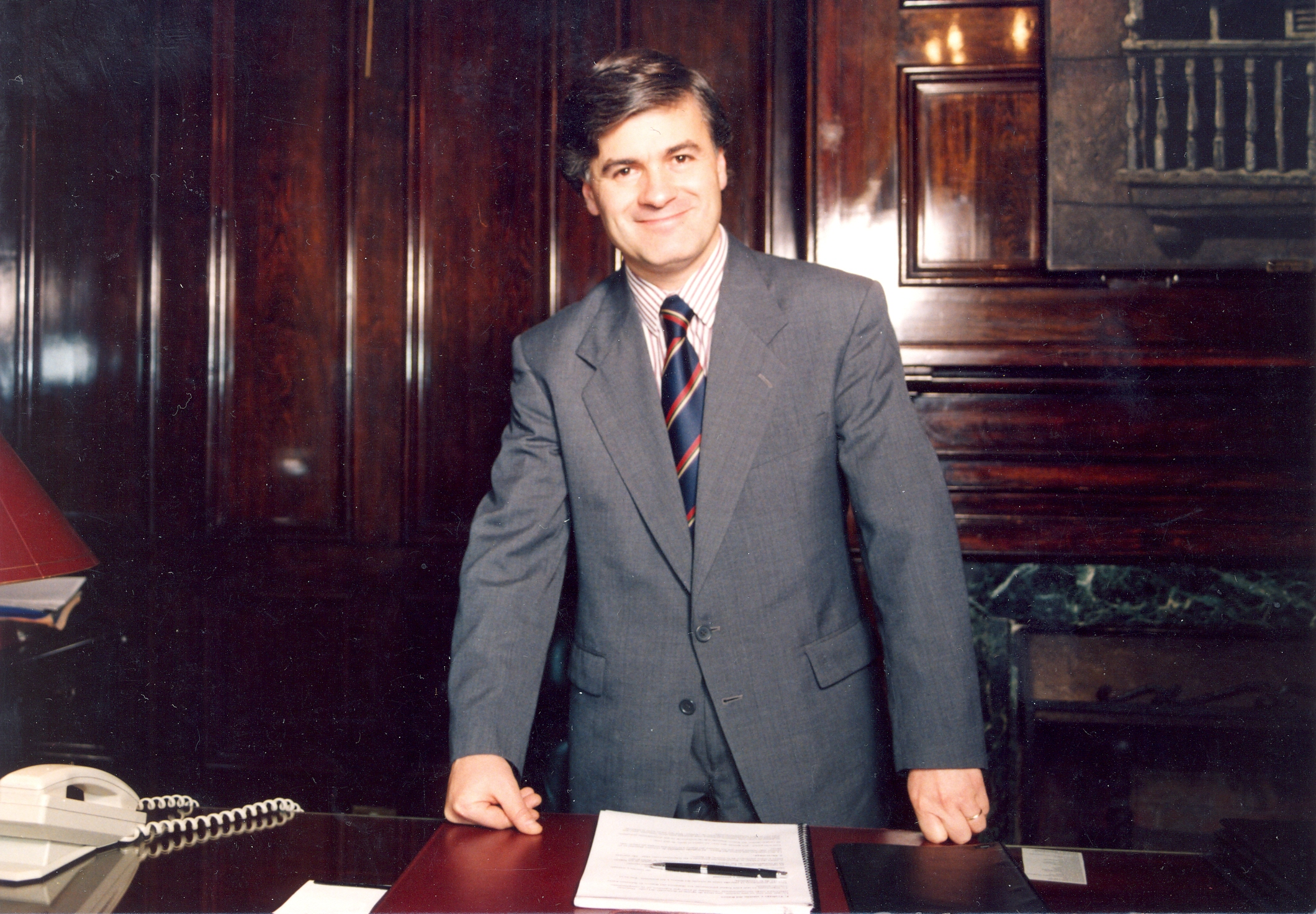

Minister of Economy
- In office 28 September 1992 – 16 December 1993
- President: Patricio Aylwin
- Preceded by: Carlos Ominami
- Succeeded by: Jaime Tohá

Personal details
- Born: 10 July 1954 (age 72) Santiago, Chile
- Party: Popular Unitary Action Movement (1969−1970); Party for Democracy (1987−present)
- Spouse: Consuelo Líbano
- Children: Three
- Parent(s): Enrique Marshall; Florencia Rivera
- Education: University of Chile (B.S); Harvard University (M.S)
- Occupation: Politician
- Profession: Economist

Jorge Marshall Rivera (born 10 July 1954) is a Chilean politician who served as minister of State under Patricio Aylwin's government (1990–1994).

In 2021, he worked for Yasna Provoste's campaign.

== Biography ==
=== Education and family ===
He studied at the San Ignacio School and later qualified as a business administration at the University of Chile.

His father was Enrique Marshall Silva, who served as Superintendent of Banks between 1968 and 1970 and again between 1973 and 1974. His brother, Enrique Marshall Rivera, was appointed by the Military Junta, through Decree No. 1832 of 1973 of the Ministry of Economy, Development and Reconstruction, Directorate of Industry and Commerce, as General Coordinator for matters related to the renegotiation of the external debt.

He also served as Superintendent of Banks between 2000 and 2005 during the government of Ricardo Lagos and as a councillor of the Central Bank of Chile between 2005 and 2015. His uncle, Jorge Marshall Silva, served as general manager of the Research Department of the Central Bank of Chile during the governments of Jorge Alessandri (for part of the period), Eduardo Frei Montalva and Salvador Allende.

== Professional career ==
He earned a doctorate in economics from Harvard University in the United States. He served as an associate researcher at CIEPLAN; as a professor of economics at the University of Santiago, the University of Chile, the Pontifical Catholic University of Chile, and the Alberto Hurtado University; and as a professor in the Graduate Program in Economics of ILADES–Georgetown University.

Marshall also worked as a consultant for the United Nations, the World Bank (WB), and the International Labour Organization (ILO).

== Political career ==
He is a member of the Party for Democracy (PPD), although his political origins date back to the late 1960s, when the Popular Unitary Action Movement (MAPU) was founded.

He served as Undersecretary of Economy between March 1990 and September 1992 and later as Minister of Economy between 1992 and 1993. From that position, he promoted reforms to the intellectual property law, the foreign investment statute, fisheries administration, and the competition regime in telecommunications. He also played a role in trade agreements between countries in the region.

In December 1993, he joined the Central Bank of Chile as a councillor, replacing Juan Eduardo Herrera. He subsequently served as vice president and, on an interim basis, as president between June and September 1996, following the resignation of Roberto Zahler.

He has published several articles on the Chilean economy, with particular emphasis on macroeconomic policy, financial economics, and economic growth.

He served as vice president of BancoEstado and participated in the team that drafted the government program of Michelle Bachelet.

He left the financial institution in August 2008 in order to focus his time on the Expansiva Foundation. From October 2008, he served as a director of the Expansiva/UDP Institute of Public Policies. He later joined the Andrés Bello University as dean of the Faculty of Economics and Business.

Between 2014 and 2017, he served as president of the Chilean Maritime and Port Chamber.
