= Eduardo Frei Ruiz-Tagle =

President of Chile from 1994 to 2000

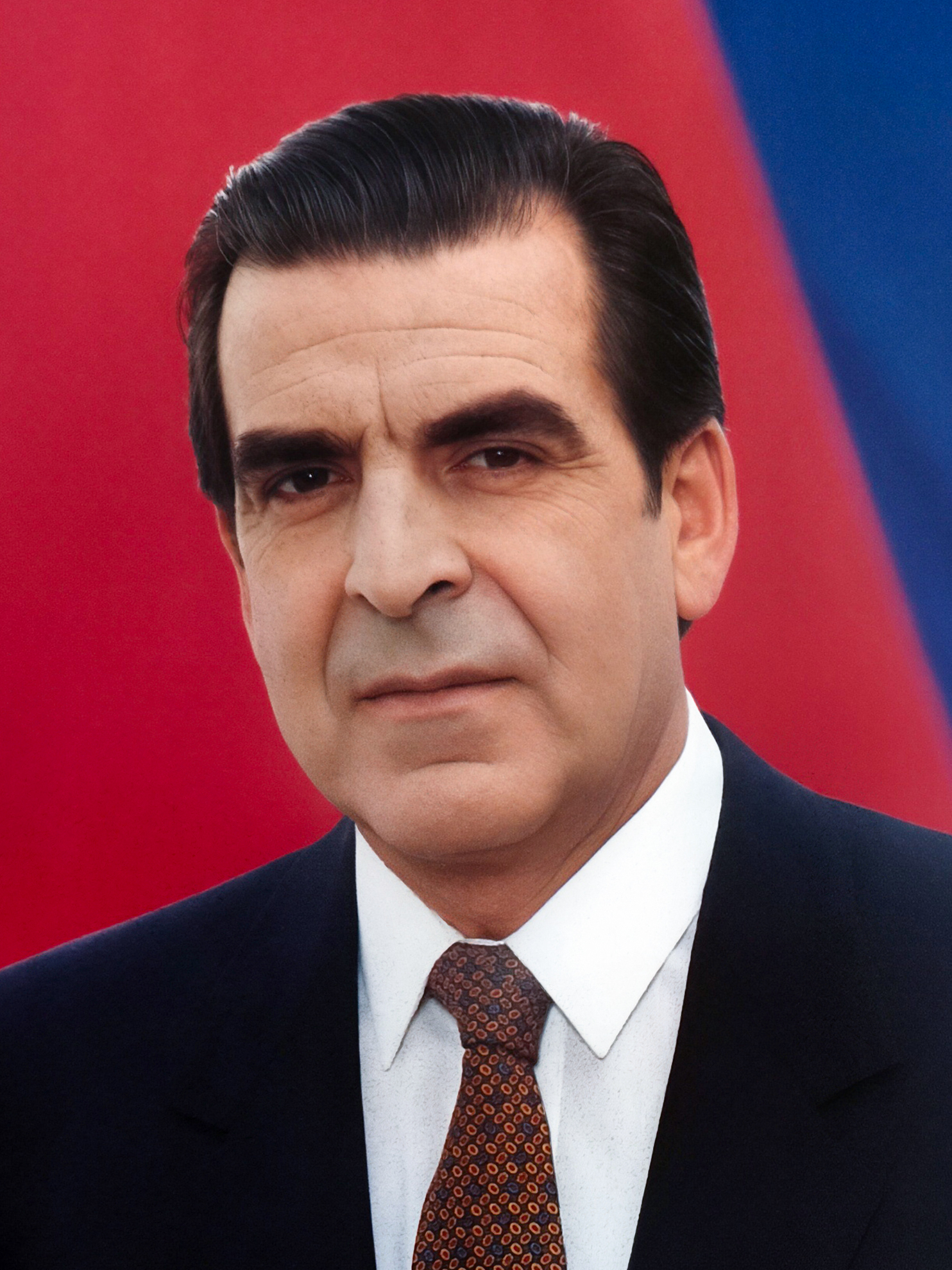
- Official portrait, 1994

32nd President of Chile
- In office 11 March 1994 – 11 March 2000
- Preceded by: Patricio Aylwin
- Succeeded by: Ricardo Lagos

Member of the Senate of Chile
- In office 11 March 2006 – 11 March 2014
- Preceded by: Gabriel Valdés Subercaseaux
- Succeeded by: Alfonso de Urresti
- Constituency: North Los Lagos Region
- In office 11 March 1990 – 11 March 1994
- Preceded by: Position established
- Succeeded by: María Elena Carrera
- Constituency: East Santiago

President of the Senate of Chile
- In office 11 March 2006 – 11 March 2008
- Preceded by: Sergio Romero Pizarro
- Succeeded by: Adolfo Zaldívar

Senator for life
- In office 11 March 2000 – 11 March 2006
- Succeeded by: Office abolished

Personal details
- Born: Eduardo Alfredo Juan Bernardo Frei Ruiz-Tagle; 24 June 1942 (age 84) Santiago, Chile
- Party: Christian Democratic
- Spouse: Marta Larraechea Bolívar (m. 1967)
- Children: Verónica; Cecilia; Magdalena; Catalina
- Relatives: Carmen Frei (Sister)
- Education: University of Chile
- Occupation: Civil engineer
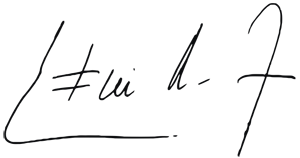
- Signature

Eduardo Alfredo Juan Bernardo Frei Ruiz-Tagle (Spanish pronunciation: [eˈðwaɾðo alˈfɾeðo ˈxwam beɾˈnaɾðo ˈfɾej rwis ˈtaɣle]; born 24 June 1942) is a Chilean politician and civil engineer who served as president of Chile from 1994 to 2000. He was also a Senator, fulfilling the role of President of the Senate from 2006 to 2008. He attempted a comeback as the candidate of the ruling Concertación coalition for the 2009 presidential election, but was narrowly defeated. His father was Eduardo Frei Montalva, president of Chile from 1964 to 1970.

His presidency was marked by a consolidation of Chile's transition to democracy albeit the indictment and arrest of Augusto Pinochet in his last year of government heated up national politics. Economically, he oversaw a period of rapid economic growth that was only temporarily stunted by the 1997 Asian financial crisis.

In the 2020s he has taken political positions different from those of the Christian Democratic Party aligning more with the views of centrist and right-wing parties in the constitutional referendums of 2022 and 2023.

== Early life ==
Frei was born in Santiago to Eduardo Frei Montalva and María Ruiz-Tagle Jiménez. He received all his schooling at the Luis Campino Institute. He then attended the University of Chile, where he graduated as a civil engineer, specializing in hydraulics. After graduation, he followed advanced courses in management in Italy.

== Political career ==
Frei took his first steps in politics while at the university, where he was a student leader. In 1958, he joined the Christian Democrat party, and in 1964 participated actively in his father's successful presidential campaign. Between 1969 and 1988 he concentrated on his profession, as one of the partners of Sigdo Koppers S.A., the largest engineering company in Chile.

In 1988 Frei founded and promoted the Comité Pro Elecciones Libres ("Committee for the promotion of free elections"). In 1989, he was elected Senator for Santiago, obtaining the highest number of votes in the whole country. In the Senate, he presided over the Treasury and Budget Commission and was a member of the Housing Commission.

== Presidency ==
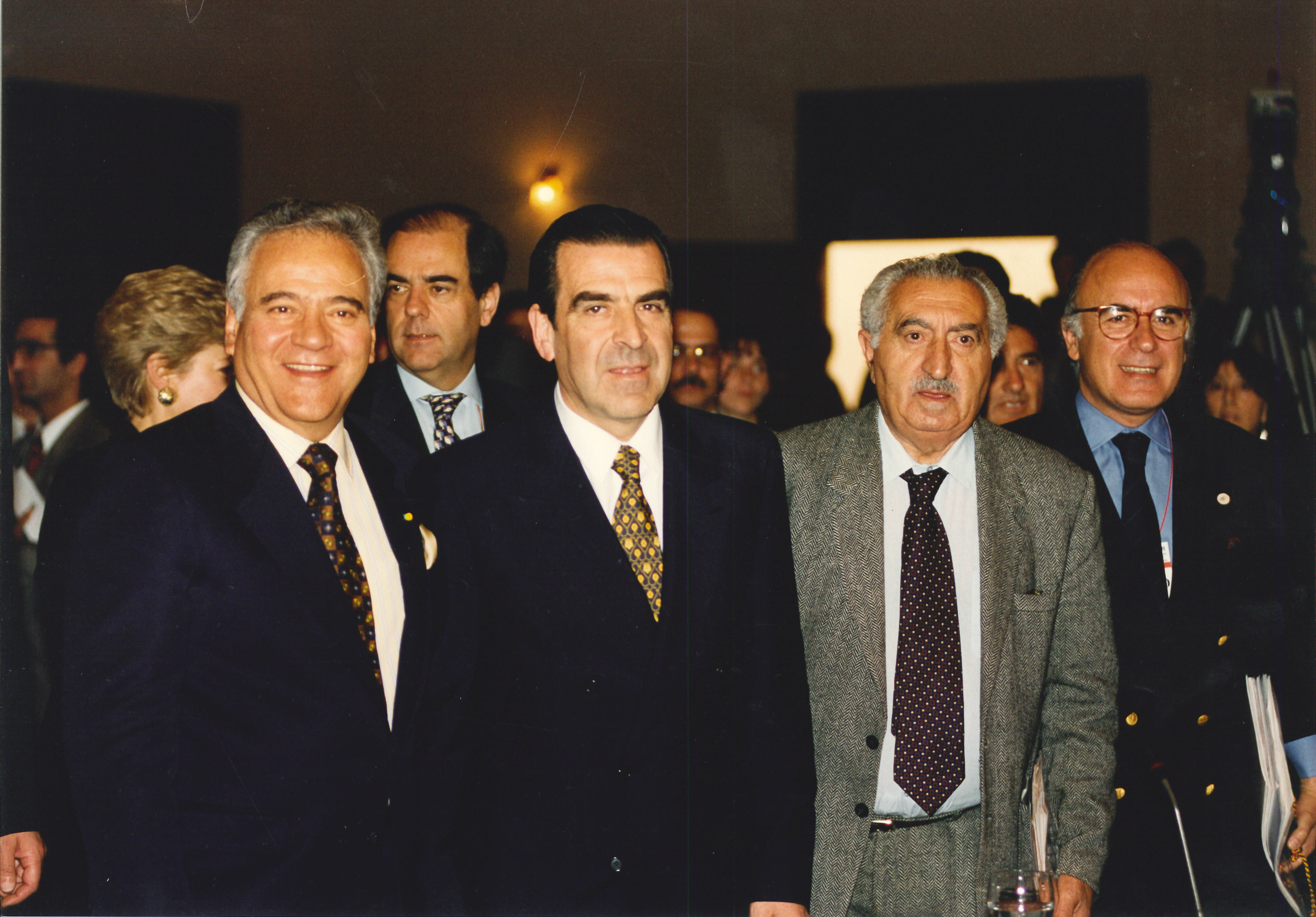
Frei Ruiz-Tagle (center) together with members of his 1993 presidential campaign team.

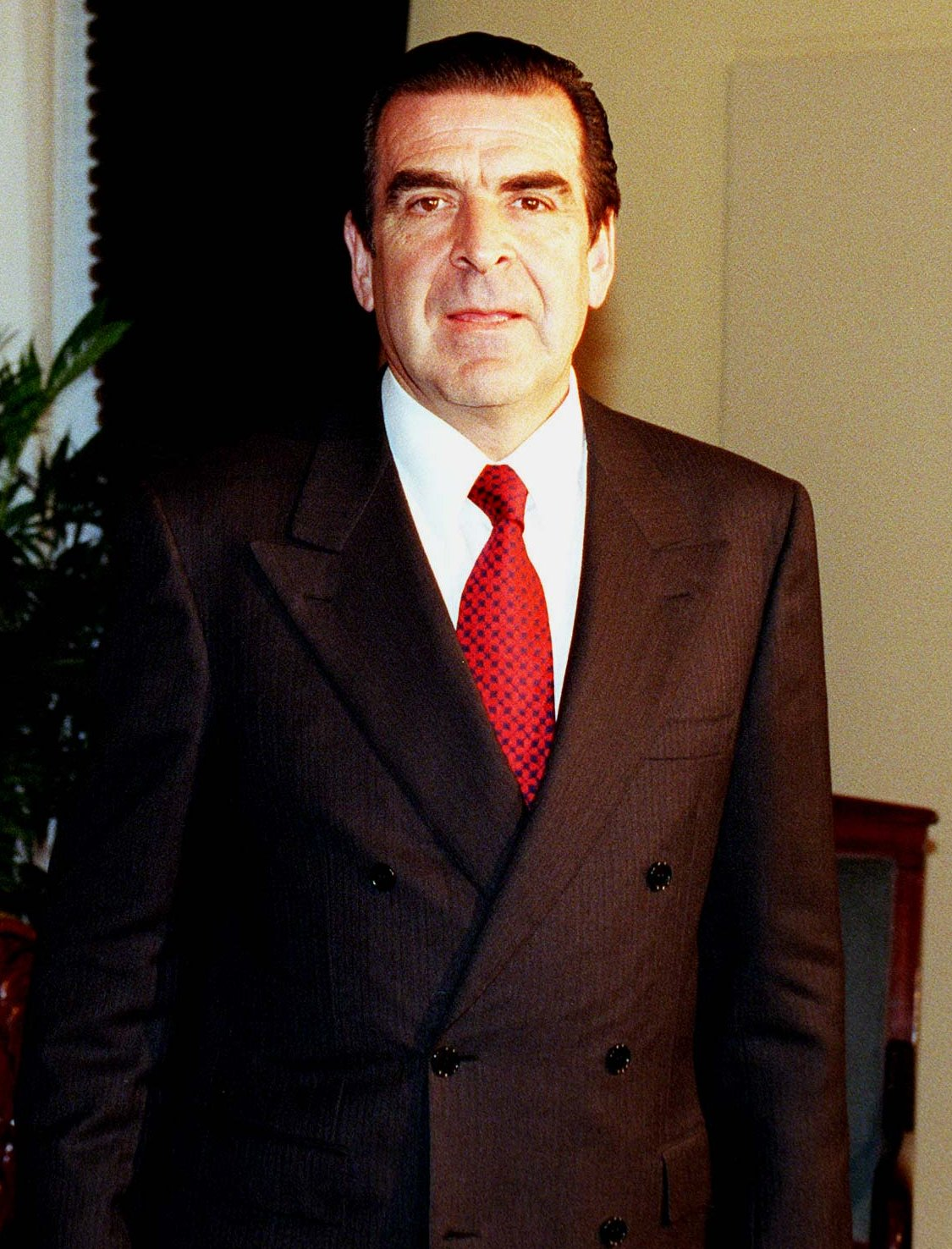
President Frei in 1998

=== Elections ===
Frei participated as a pre-candidate in the primary elections held on 23 May 1993 among supporters and members of the parties that made up the Coalition of Parties for Democracy, prevailing with 60.7% of the votes and defeating socialist Ricardo Lagos, former minister of education and a staunch opponent of the military dictatorship, who obtained 39.2%. Frei was chosen as candidate for the presidency of the Republic.

In the presidential election of December 1993 six candidates ran, and Frei was elected with 57.98% of the votes (4,040,497, becoming the first to surpass the four million mark). The second-highest vote total was obtained by the centre-right Arturo Alessandri Besa – grandson of the two-time president Arturo Alessandri – (with 24.41% of the vote), the third by the economist José Piñera Echenique – who had been a minister of state under Pinochet – (with 6.18% of the vote), the fourth by the also economist Manfred Max-Neef (with 5.55% of the vote), the fifth by the priest Eugenio Pizarro Poblete (with 4.70% of the vote), and the sixth by the businessman Cristián Reitze Campos (with 1.17% of the vote). Although as of the date of the election (in December 1993) the 1980 Political Constitution established that the presidential term was eight years, once elected but before taking office, Constitutional Reform Law No. 19,295 was enacted (published on 4 March 1994, seven days before Frei took office), which changed the presidential term, reducing its duration to six years.

=== Overview ===
On 11 March 1994, he assumed the presidency, receiving the presidential sash from the president of the Senate, Gabriel Valdés Subercaseaux – who had been minister of foreign affairs throughout the government of Frei Montalva –, and succeeding his party colleague Patricio Aylwin.

Frei's presidency was notable in making improvements in health and education as well as reducing poverty.

Eduardo Frei Ruiz-Tagle had particularly good relations with his Argentine counterpart Carlos Menem. During Frei's tenure the Laguna del Desierto territorial dispute with Argentina was solved, albeit the arbitrage favoured the Argentine position.

He was succeeded by Ricardo Lagos in 2000.

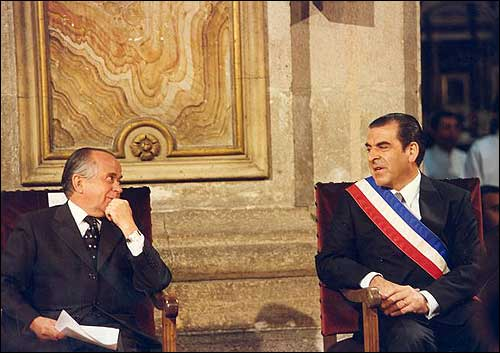
Frei with Senator Andrés Zaldívar

Following the end of his presidency, Frei assumed, as a former President, a seat as senator-for-life in Congress.

=== Government program ===
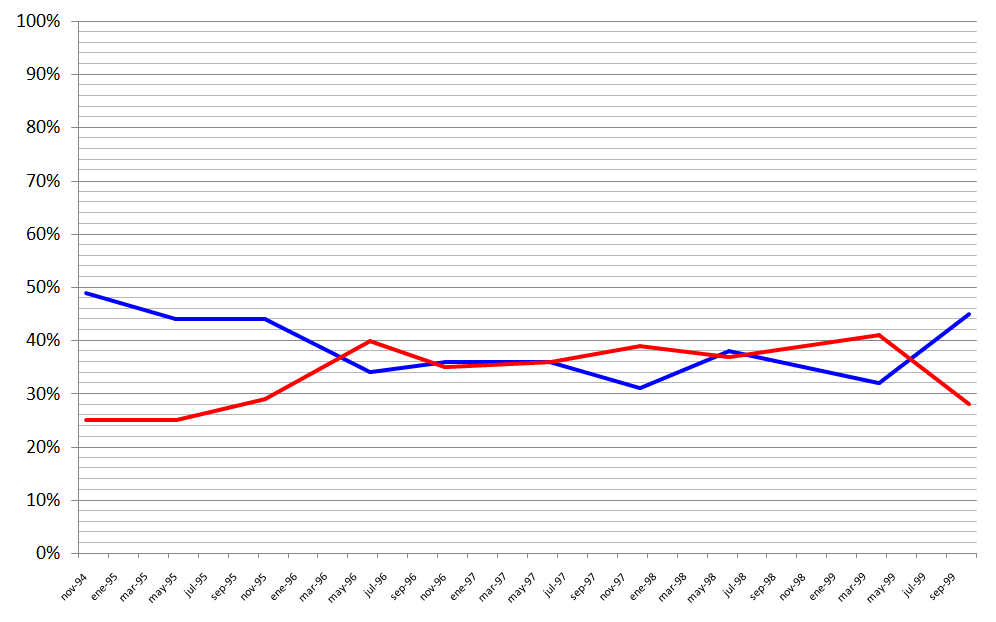
Approval (blue) and disapproval (red) levels of Frei Ruiz-Tagle, according to the CEP survey.

According to his first speech before the Plenary Congress, which took place on 21 May 1994, his administration aimed to fulfill six "Great National Tasks", which, in his view, the country had the "historic" opportunity to achieve. Broadly speaking these were: to consolidate economic development, continuing the path followed to achieve "development with equity"; to "overcome extreme forms of poverty"; to modernize labour relations; to build a modern educational system; to create an efficient and equitable health system; and to deepen Chile's "international integration".

In the first proposal, which would serve as the basis for achieving the next four, there stood out the inflexible fight against inflation, austerity and increased savings, high and sustained growth, increases in real wages, greater consumption by lower-income families, and deeper trade openness and levels of competitiveness.

The final task, meanwhile, rested on "uncompromising respect for international law", within what he called "a diplomacy for development". It also emphasized the deepening of the internationalization of the Chilean economy, through agreements and alliances; the country's participation in initiatives "aimed at achieving peace, the extension of democracy and respect for human rights, and the development of social equity in the international system", seeking a "multiple and balanced integration into the world".

=== Economic management ===
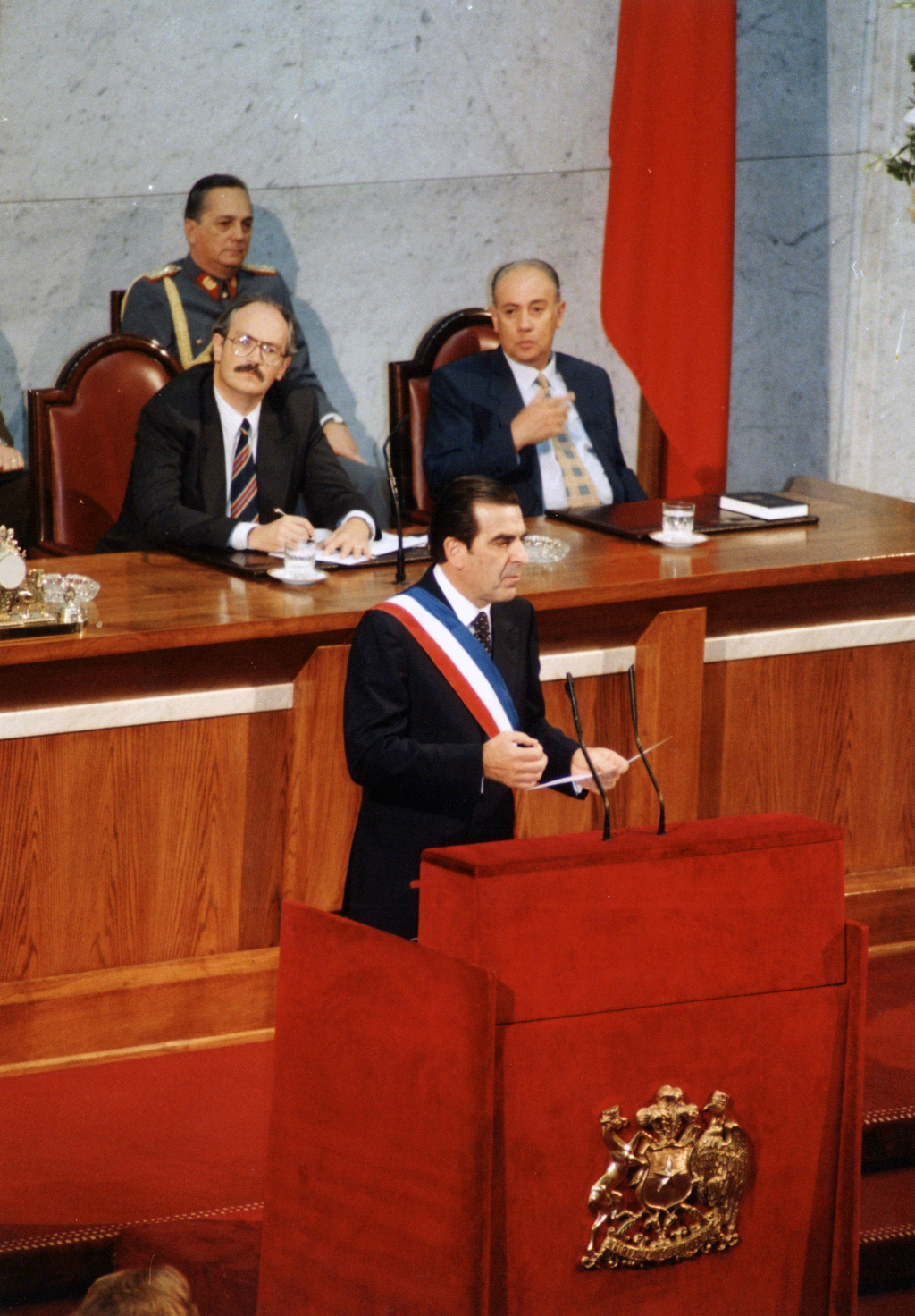
Eduardo Frei Ruiz-Tagle (center) during his speech before the Plenary Congress, in 1995.

Viewed from a strictly quantitative standpoint, his mandate fulfilled the goal of expanding the economy, particularly in the first four years of his term, a period in which the gross domestic product (GDP) advanced at average rates of 7.8%. In 1998, that situation changed abruptly, because GDP grew only 3.23% in 1996 pesos according to the so-called original series published by the Central Bank. The slowdown, brought about by the fall in exports as a consequence of the Asian financial crisis, was accentuated by a strong process of internal adjustment, with high interest rates.

As a result of this episode, the economy contracted by 0.76% in 1999. Four quarters of activity in the red had technically placed the country in its first recession since the beginning of the 1980s, in the midst of the military dictatorship.

Apart from the criticisms of the handling by his minister of finance, the also Christian Democrat Eduardo Aninat, and of his party colleague in the autonomous Central Bank, Carlos Massad, undoubtedly the bitterest face of the crisis lay in the explosive increase in national unemployment, which came to surpass the two-digit barrier in May 1999 with 10.10%, directly or indirectly affecting thousands of Chileans.

This recession had as its backdrop a severe energy crisis, derived from the drought that struck the Andean country, which depended on water-based generation. This led to progress in interconnection with Argentina for the transport of natural gas, a development that would sharply lower costs.

In the matter of fighting poverty, economic growth made it possible for the bottom 20% of the population to increase its consumption capacity by 10%.

In the field of infrastructure, the Ministry of Public Works (MOP), led for most of the time by the future president Ricardo Lagos, continued the route traced by the previous administration, with concession projects that managed to inject billions of dollars into roads and airports. The most emblematic works of the period were the second carriageway along the Pan-American Highway between La Serena and Puerto Montt with an investment of about US$1500 million, and the modernization of Santiago's Arturo Merino Benitez Airport for about US$200 million. All in all, the greatest work of the period and of the entire decade was Line 5 of the Santiago Metro, which made it possible to link the city centre with the populous commune of La Florida.

In the matter of privatizations, the Chilean state raised about US$1800 million during the period from the sale of strategic stakes in the water companies Essel, Essal, Emos and Esval, which were handed over to operators with vast experience, such as the Agbar Group or Iberdrola, with the commitment to improve their management and invest resources in networks and systems.

The country's main ports also passed into private hands during the period, on the basis of a modernization policy defined in 1995 and ratified by the Parliament. Thus, in 1999 the handover of berths in Valparaíso, San Antonio and San Vicente was completed in exchange for US$294 million.

At this point it is worth noting, lastly, the incorporation of private capital into Empresa Electrica Colbun Machicura, one of the largest in the country, in 1997.

=== Social policies ===
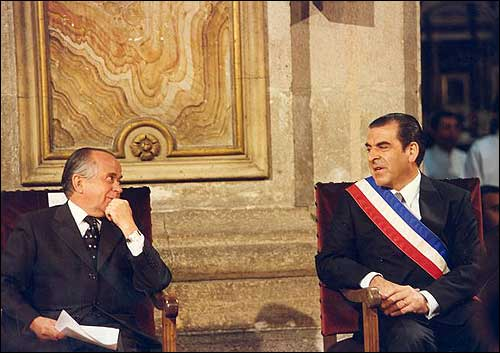
Frei Ruiz-Tagle as president of the Republic together with his fellow party member Andrés Zaldívar – who had been a minister of state during the government of Frei Montalva – as president of the Senate.

From the educational point of view, his administration, as a result of greater economic growth, contributed more resources to the system, a fact that allowed concrete advances such as curricular reform, the extension of the school day, the increase of infrastructure, and the Enlaces Network. With respect to teachers, the greatest benefit came in the reform of the Teaching Statute in 1995, training scholarships, and salary increases, although they were not satisfied and repeatedly expressed their discontent through major strikes.

Separate mention deserves the announcement of the closure of the coal-mining deposit of Lota, dependent on the state-owned Empresa Nacional del Carbon (Enacar), made by the government in April 1997. The measure, described as inevitable in light of the impossibility of meeting annual production targets and halting the high and growing costs, triggered a focus of agitation that was only resolved months later through extraordinary allocations of fiscal resources. Enacar, with its workforce of 1,350 workers, was the main source of employment in the city located in the central-southern zone of the country.

=== Environmental policies ===
Highly questioned were the decisions he made in environmental matters. A first case considered emblematic was the final approval of the construction of Arauco's Valdivia plant in San Jose de la Mariquina, which had been approved with conditions in 1996 by the same local authorities gathered in the Corema.

Also generating controversy was the construction of the Ralco hydroelectric plant of the National Electricity Company (Endesa) in the Biobio Region, on lands belonging to the Pehuenche people since ancestral times and the signing of the mining treaty with Argentina, which made possible the installation of Pascua Lama, as well as the study of mining projects such as Vicuna, Amos-Andres, Las Flechas and El Pachon.

=== International relations ===
==== Economic opening ====
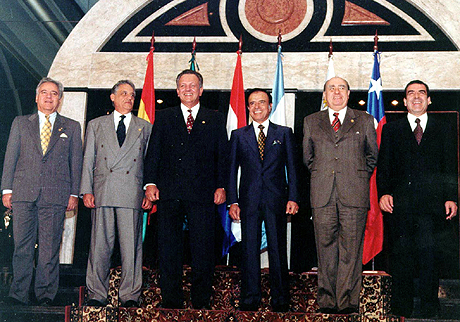
Frei Ruiz-Tagle (first on the right) during the 12th Mercosur presidential summit in June 1997.

Economically and politically, during his administration the country was linked with its neighbours and with the rest of the world much more than in any previous period.

In the first aspect, the consolidation of an open economy respectful of foreign capital, as well as solid from the point of view of macro, cleared the way for the signing of free trade agreements and association agreements. In total there were twelve, notably those signed with Canada, Mexico, Central America, Peru, and Mercosur. The pact with the United States remained pending, and would be signed in the following administration. He also achieved Chile's entry into the World Trade Organization (WTO) and the Asia-Pacific Economic Cooperation (APEC) forum.

Another notable event was the holding, in 1996, of the 6th Ibero-American Summit of heads of state and government, on which occasion the country hosted in Santiago and Vina del Mar numerous heads of government, in addition to the king of Spain, Juan Carlos I.

Likewise, during his term there took place the visit of the president of the United States, Bill Clinton, in 1998, who travelled to attend the 2nd Summit of the Americas, openly praised Chile on the occasion by stating that it was a hemispheric leader and an example for the whole region because of the strengthening of its democracy, the openness of its economy, and the way the government had tackled the fight against poverty.

Lastly, in the sphere of relations with neighbouring countries, in October 1994, the ruling of an international tribunal in Rio de Janeiro, composed of five members, was accepted; it awarded Argentine sovereignty over Laguna del Desierto. In addition to this, his government obtained approval of the treaty on the Southern Patagonian Ice Field, with which it put an end to the last pending border dispute with Argentina, and achieved the signing of the Act of Execution of the Treaty of Lima of 1929 with Peru, on 13 November 1999, thereby settling the pending aspects of Article 5 of that treaty and Article 2 of its Supplementary Protocol.

=== Health policies ===
In the area of health, despite spending nearly doubling during his six years, management did not improve significantly. Likewise, problems with the trade groups were permanent, particularly during the brief period of the minister of the health portfolio, Carlos Massad, who, because he was an economist and not a physician, was rejected from the outset by the leaders of the sector. During the period the municipalized care allocation system was reformed, the National Health Fund (Fonasa) was rationalized, and modern hospitals were inaugurated.

=== Justice policies ===
In the area of justice, in 1999 he launched the Criminal Procedure Reform (RPP), described as the "most important of the last one hundred years"; this initiative contemplated the introduction of the oral trial, the establishment of new courts, the creation of the office of national public prosecutor – with the appointment of lawyer Guillermo Piedrabuena Richard as first officeholder – and, in January 2000, of the regional prosecutors. The new model would function fully under the administration of president Ricardo Lagos and would amount to a revolution in the system known up to that point. It should also be noted that during his mandate controversial pardons were granted, such as for example to a drug trafficker, and to Cupertino Andaur on 29 August 1996, who had been sentenced to death ten days earlier after being found guilty of the rape and murder of a nine-year-old child.

He also promulgated a series of laws that sought to strengthen the family as the fundamental nucleus of society. Among these stood out the laws on domestic violence, filiation, family protection, and adoptions, and he left in progress the legislative processing of the bill that created the Family courts, which materialized in 2005.

==== Punta Peuco Prison ====
Plan of Punta Peuco Prison, Til Til, Chile.

On 14 June 1995, he signed decree No. 580, which created the "Special Punta Peuco Preventive Detention and Penitentiary Compliance Centre", better known as Punta Peuco Prison, because at that time a place was needed for those implicated in the Letelier case, retired general Manuel Contreras and brigadier Pedro Espinoza, both convicted of human rights crimes committed during the military dictatorship, to serve their sentences.

The decree was also signed by the minister of justice, Soledad Alvear; however, that corresponded to the minister of public works, Ricardo Lagos, who opposed the project and presented his resignation to the president, which ultimately was not accepted.

=== Arrest of Pinochet in London ===
General Augusto Pinochet was arrested in the United Kingdom on 16 October 1998. That day the then senator for life – who until March of that same year had served as commander-in-chief of the Army – was detained in a London clinic by order of Spanish judge Baltasar Garzon who was pursuing him for the deaths of Spanish citizens that had occurred in Chile during the dictatorship.

The former dictator, who had arrived in England for the purpose of undergoing surgery for a hernia, remained detained for 17 months, returning to the country only days before the end of the government, which had promised to bring him back arguing a violation of the country's sovereignty.

According to the Ministry of Foreign Affairs (Minrel), the crimes of the dictatorship had been committed in Chilean territory and, therefore, it was for that country to judge them. This policy was not supported by all members of the Concertacion, especially certain sectors of the Socialist Party (PS) and the Party for Democracy (PPD), which expressed their support for the detention of the former ruler.

The situation was resolved after Pinochet's lawyers argued that if the United Kingdom detained him at the request of the Spanish government, Chile could also detain Margaret Thatcher if she were requested by the governments of Argentina or Ireland. The British home secretary, the Labour Jack Straw, was compelled to order neurological and geriatric examinations of the then 84-year-old military officer; in December 1999.

Considering the report and his age, Straw decided to release Pinochet on humanitarian grounds on 2 March 2000. On 3 March he landed at Pudahuel, where he was received by the then commander-in-chief, appointed by the government itself, Ricardo Izurieta.

== Return to the Congress ==
Since constitutional reforms in 2005 abolished life senators from 2006, Frei ran for and won an elected Senate seat in the December 2005 parliamentary elections in the electoral district of Valdivia Province and Osorno Province, together with Andrés Allamand. On 11 March 2006, Frei became President of the Senate, like his father, who was also President of the Senate after being President of the Republic.

Frei, whose grandfather Eduardo Frei Schlinz had emigrated to Chile from Switzerland, obtained Swiss citizenship in February 2009.

In 2009–2010 elections, Frei ran for the presidency of Chile for a second time, again as the candidate of the centre-left Concertación center-coalition, promising continuity of the popular outgoing President Michelle Bachelet's path. Some of his presidential campaign banners and billboards pictured him, accompanied by Bachelet over his left shoulder. In the first round of the elections, held on 13 December 2009, Frei held 29.60% of the official vote, second to his opponent Sebastián Piñera, who led with 44.05%. Since neither candidate received more than half of the total votes, a runoff election was held on Sunday, 17 January 2010. The first preliminary results announced by the Deputy Interior Ministry at 21:00 GMT on election day gave Piñera 51.87% and Frei holding 48.12%. Frei conceded to Piñera at 21:44 GMT.

In a graceful exit from the campaign, Frei stated,

"The election is over and Chileans have shown civic maturity.... The results clearly show the solidity of our democracy. It has been clean and transparent in line with our tradition. I want to congratulate Pinera, to whom most Chileans have given their trust for the next four years."

== Styles, honours and arms ==
Presidential styles of Eduardo Frei Ruiz-Tagle
- Reference style: His Excellency
- Spoken style: Your Excellency
- Alternative style: Mr. President

=== National honours ===
- Grand Master (1994–2000) and Collar of the Order of Merit
- Grand Master (1994–2000) and Collar of the Order of Bernardo O'Higgins

=== Foreign honours ===
- Peru:
  - Commander of the Order of the Sun (Peru)
- Italy:
  - Knight Grand Cross with Collar of the Order of Merit of the Italian Republic (19 July 1995)
- Croatia:
  - Grand Cross of the Grand Order of King Tomislav (8 November 1994)
- Malaysia:
  - Honorary Recipient of the Order of the Crown of the Realm (1995)
- Poland:
  - Grand Cross of the Order of Merit of the Republic of Poland
- Spain:
  - Knight of the Collar of the Order of Isabella the Catholic, 3 March 1995
  - Member of the Club de Madrid, an independent non-profit organization created to promote democracy and change in the international community, composed by more than 100 members: former democratic Heads of State and Government from around the world.
- Uruguay
  - Medal of the Oriental Republic of Uruguay (1996)

=== Arms ===
As Knight of the Collar of the Order of the Seraphim

Assembly seats
New constituency	Senator for East Santiago; 1990–1994	Succeeded by María Elena Carrera
Preceded by Gabriel Valdés	Senator for the Los Ríos Region; 2006–2014	Succeeded by Alfonso de Urresti
Party political offices
Preceded by Andrés Zaldívar	President of the Christian Democratic Party; 1991–1993	Succeeded by Gutenberg Martínez
Preceded by Patricio Aylwin	Christian Democratic nominee for President of Chile; 1993	Succeeded by Ricardo Lagos
Preceded by Patricio Aylwin	Concertación nominee for President of Chile; 1993	Succeeded by Ricardo Lagos
Preceded by Michelle Bachelet	Christian Democratic nominee for President of Chile; 2009–10	Succeeded by Michelle Bachelet
Preceded by Michelle Bachelet	Concertación nominee for President of Chile; 2009–10	Political alliance dissolved
Political offices
Preceded by Patricio Aylwin	President of Chile; 1994–2000	Succeeded by Ricardo Lagos
Preceded by Sergio Romero	President of the Senate of Chile; 2006–2008	Succeeded by Adolfo Zaldívar
