= Pedro García Aspillaga =

Chilean politician

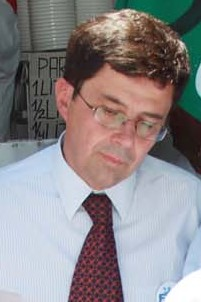

Councilor of Santiago Centro
- In office 6 December 2004 – 6 December 2008

Ministry of Health
- In office 3 March 2003 – 11 March 2006
- President: Ricardo Lagos
- Preceded by: Osvaldo Artaza
- Succeeded by: María Soledad Barría

Personal details
- Born: 7 October 1960 (age 65) Santiago, Chile
- Party: Christian Democratic Party; Amarillos por Chile
- Education: University of Chile (BA); Alberto Hurtado University (MBA); Loyola University Maryland (MBA)
- Profession: Physician; Business administrator

Pedro Enrique García Aspillaga (born 7 October 1960) is a Chilean physician and politician who served as a minister in the government of Ricardo Lagos.

== Biography ==
He completed his primary and secondary education at the Lycée Antoine de Saint-Exupéry de Santiago in Santiago, Chile (1966–1977) and at Norwalk High School in 1977. He received his medical degree from the University of Chile. He subsequently completed an MBA jointly offered by the Alberto Hurtado University and Loyola College in Baltimore (1998–1999).

He is married to María Francisca Castoldi, with whom he has two children, María Ignacia and José Pedro.

In 1986, he began practicing as an obstetrician-gynecologist at the Hospital del Salvador in Santiago, becoming the hospital's Deputy Medical Director from 1994 to 1996. In 2000, he was appointed Director of the Eastern Metropolitan Health Service, and subsequently served as Director of the Public Health Institute of Chile (ISP).

In March 2009, he became Dean of the Faculty of Health at the Santo Tomás University, Chile.

== Political career ==
In 2003, he succeeded his friend Osvaldo Artaza as Minister of Health. During his tenure, he oversaw the implementation of the Health System Reform and one of the principal initiatives of the administration of President Ricardo Lagos, the AUGE Plan, which provides state-funded coverage for a defined set of diseases. He was succeeded in March 2006 by María Soledad Barría, who took office under the administration of President Michelle Bachelet.

In the 2008 Chilean municipal election, he was elected as a councillor for the commune of Santiago, and was re-elected in the 2012 Chilean municipal election, serving until December 2016.

He was a member of the Christian Democratic Party (PDC), where he belonged to the party's most conservative faction, known as Progresismo con Progreso ("Progressivism with Progress"). During the 2017 Chilean presidential election, he was among the Christian Democratic members who declined to endorse the New Majority candidate, Alejandro Guillier, in the runoff election. Following Guillier's defeat, members of the PDC sought García's expulsion from the party, after which he resigned his membership on 3 January 2018.
