= Andrés Zaldívar =

Chilean politician

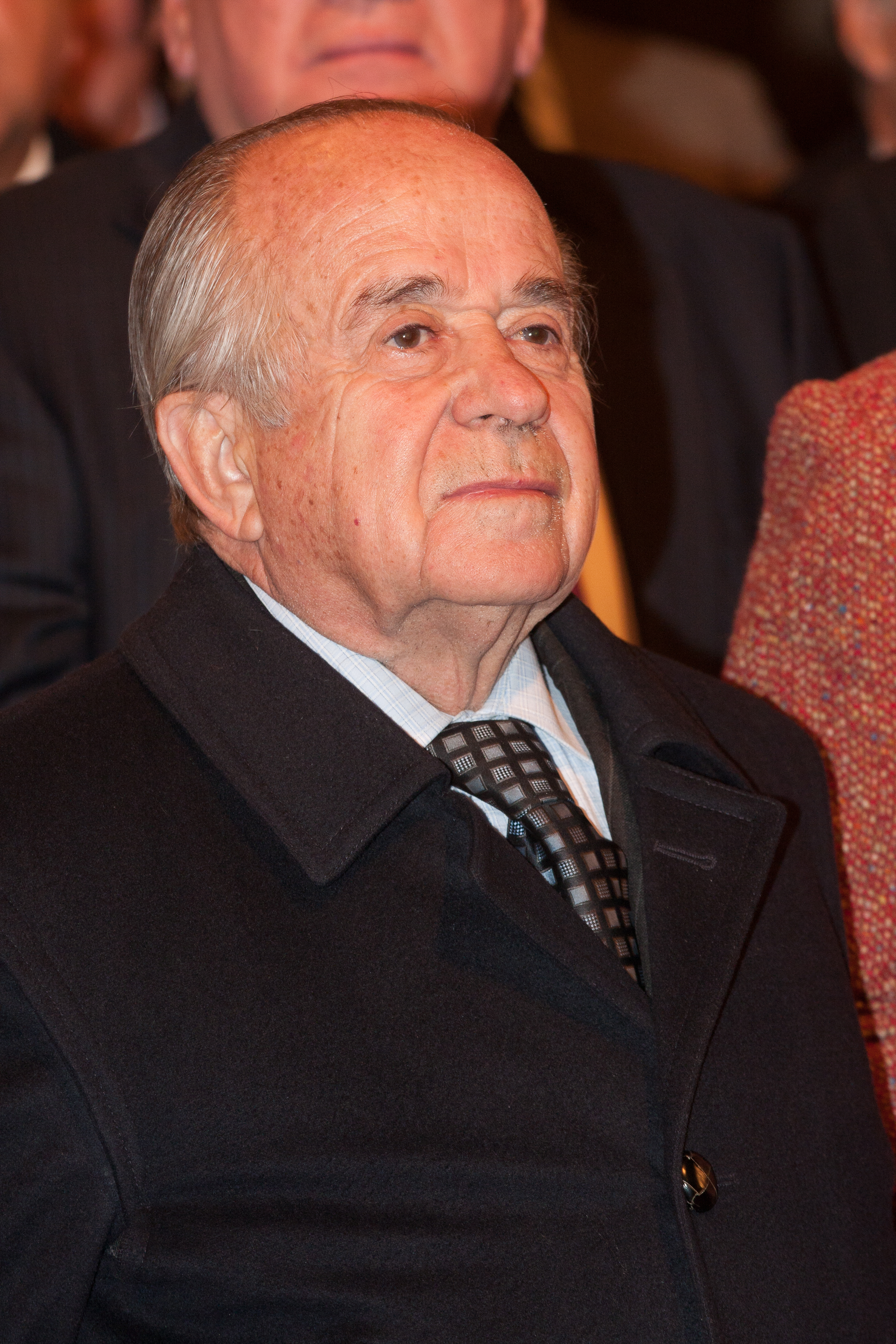

President of the Senate
- In office 11 March 2017 – 11 March 2018
- Preceded by: Ricardo Lagos Weber
- Succeeded by: Carlos Montes Cisternas
- In office 11 March 1998 – 16 March 2004
- Preceded by: Sergio Romero Pizarro
- Succeeded by: Hernán Larraín

Member of the Senate
- In office 11 March 2010 – 11 March 2018
- Preceded by: Jaime Gazmuri
- Succeeded by: Ricardo Lagos Weber
- Constituency: 5th Circumscription
- In office 11 March 1990 – 11 March 2006
- Preceded by: District created
- Succeeded by: Guido Girardi
- Constituency: 11th District
- In office 15 May 1973 – 11 September 1973
- Succeeded by: 1973 coup d'etat

Ministry of the Interior
- In office 11 March 2006 – 14 July 2006
- President: Michelle Bachelet
- Preceded by: Francisco Vidal
- Succeeded by: Belisario Velasco

Ministry of Finance
- In office 15 March 1968 – 3 November 1970
- President: Eduardo Frei Montalva
- Preceded by: Raúl Sáez
- Succeeded by: Américo Zorrilla

Ministry of the Economy, Development, and Reconstruction
- In office 15 February 1968 – 2 May 1968
- President: Eduardo Frei Montalva
- Preceded by: Domingo Santa María
- Succeeded by: Juan de Dios Carmona

Undersecretary of Finance
- In office 3 November 1964 – 1967
- President: Eduardo Frei Montalva
- Preceded by: Carlos Reed Valenzuela
- Succeeded by: José Florencio Guzmán

Personal details
- Born: 18 March 1936 (age 90) Santiago, Chile
- Party: Christian Democratic Party (1958–)
- Other political affiliations: Social Christian Conservative Party (1952–1958)
- Spouse: Inés Hurtado Ruiz-Tagle
- Children: 4
- Parent(s): Alberto Zadívar; Josefina Larraín
- Education: University of Chile (LL.B)
- Occupation: Politician
- Profession: Lawyer

José Andrés Rafael Zaldívar Larraín (born 18 March 1936), popularly known as El Chico Zaldívar ("Short Zaldívar"), is a prominent Chilean Christian Democrat politician. Andrés Zaldívar is of Basque descent.

In later days, Zaldívar became a leader and chief strategist of Michelle Bachelet's presidential campaign. After the victory of the socialist candidate Bachelet, Zaldívar was appointed as her Minister of the Interior.

On 21 March 2017 he succeeded Ricardo Lagos Weber as President of the Senate.

== Early years ==
Zaldívar was born in Santiago, Chile. He attended primary and secondary school at the Instituto Alonso de Ercilla de Santiago, a member of the Congregación de los Hermanos Maristas. In 1959 Zaldívar graduated from the Universidad de Chile, having written the thesis Rental Laws, Commentaries and Jurisprudence.

In 1952 Zaldívar began his political career by joining the Conservative Party. while attending university, he participated in the International Congress of Students in Chicago in 1956 representing Chile, as the Secretary of the Union of Federated Universities of Chile. In 1957 he joined the Christian Democrat Party, and served as Juvenile President for Santiago's Third District.

Zaldívar practiced law in the Municipality of Colina from 1959 to 1962, then became magistrate of the local police of La Cisterna.

== Political career ==
In the government of Eduardo Frei, Zaldívar served as Undersecretary of Finance from 1964 to 1967. He became Minister of Finance in 1968 and Minister of both Finance and Economy, in 1970. From 1968 to 1970, Zaldívar served as governor of the Inter-American Development Bank and was representative to the Interamerican Committee of the Alliance for Progress in Washington from 1968 to 1969 and representative to the Economic and Social Committee in Caracas in 1970.

During the years of the Popular Unity coalition, Zaldívar served many different posts within the party: from 1970 to 1973 he was a national counselor of the Christian Democrats, in 1972 he became a member of the Political Committee, and from 1976 to 1982 he was the president of the Christian Democrats. As such, he became one of the main leaders of the opposition to the Pinochet military regime at that time.

== Military regime ==
In 1973, Zaldívar for the first time became a member of the National Congress of Chile, upon election to the Senate of Chile for the Second Provincial District of Atacama and Coquimbo, joining the Economic Committee of Congress. However, after the Chilean coup of 1973, Congress was dissolved on September 21 and Zaldívar went into exile with his family in Spain. Returning to Chile the following year, Zaldívar became president of the Christian Democrat Party, from 1975 to 1982.

In exile, Zaldívar was made President of the International Christian Democrats, an international organization of political parties, from 1981 to 1986, when he became a member of its advisory council. In 1981, furthermore, Zaldívar was a founding member of Center for Research for Ibero-America and Spain (CIPIE) in Spain, holding the position of president. In 1988, he joined the successful "No" campaign for the national plebiscite of that year. Also in 1988, Zaldívar again became the president of his party for another two years.

== Administrations of the Concertación ==
In 1989, Zaldívar was elected Senator for the VII District of West Santiago, in one of the most hard-fought elections in history. Zaldívar received 31.27% of the vote while his partner on the list, future president Ricardo Lagos, received 30.62%.

Due to Chile's binomial voting system (where parties or coalitions of parties select lists of one or more candidates, and the top candidate from each of the top two lists is elected when the top list gets less than twice the second-place list) and since no concessions could get double the votes of the Democracy and Progress, Andrés Zaldívar and the Independent Democrat Union's Jaime Guzmán, who only received 17.91% of the vote were elected.

At this time, Zaldívar joined the Senate Public Works Committee and presided over the Finance Committee. In December of the same year, he was re-elected Senator with 27.77% of the vote. His partner on the list, Camilo Escalona, received 15.98% principally due to the migration of votes from the left to the candidate of the Communist Party of Chile, Gladys Marín Millie, who received 15.69% of the vote. This allowed Zaldívar to be elected together with the conservative Jovino Novoa, with 20.56% of the vote.

During the second period since the rise of democracy, Zaldívar participated in the Constitution, Legislation, Justice, and Regulation Committees and presided over the Interior Administration Committee. In March 1998, Zaldívar was elected President of the Senate, a post that he held until August 15, 2004.

In 1999, Zaldívar was a candidate for President of Chile, representing the Christian Democrat Party for the primary election of the Chilean presidential election of that year. Meanwhile, the coalition PPD/PS (Party for Democracy and Socialist Party of Chile) elected Ricardo Lagos as its primary candidate. In that year, the Coalition of Parties for Democracy (the Concertación) held a primary to decide between the two. Lagos won the vote, with 71.3% of the vote to Zaldívar's 28.7%.

In 2005, Zaldívar ran for the third consecutive time for the Senate seat of West Santiago at the Chilean parliamentary election of December 11, facing the Deputy Guido Girardi (PPD) (his coalition partner on the list), the Senator Jovino Novoa (UDI), and the businessman Roberto Fantuzzi (Independent); the latter two members of the Alliance for Chile coalition.

Despite a strong campaign, Zaldívar did not retain his seat in the senate, although he exceeded the top candidate of his opponents' list, since the Democratic Coalition's votes did not double that of the Alliance for Chile, fellow Democratic Coalition member Guido Girardi was elected and Alliance for Chile member, the founder and president of Independent Democrat Union, Jovino Novoa was reelected.
