= Belisario Velasco =

Chilean politician (1936–2023)

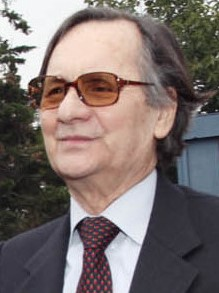
- Velasco in 2009

Minister of Interior
- In office 14 July 2006 – 4 January 2008
- President: Michelle Bachelet
- Preceded by: Andrés Zaldívar
- Succeeded by: Edmundo Pérez Yoma

Personal details
- Born: 5 January 1936 Santiago, Chile
- Died: 24 August 2023 (aged 87)
- Party: Christian Democratic Party (1957–2023)
- Spouse(s): María de la Luz Silva Donoso; Christiane de Beauffort
- Children: 6
- Occupation: Politician

Luis Antonio Belisario Velasco Baraona (5 January 1936 – 24 August 2023) was a Chilean politician and lawyer who served as Minister of the Interior during the first government of Michelle Bachelet (2006–2010).

== Political career ==
Velasco joined the Christian Democratic Party in 1957 and developed a long career within the party, maintaining his affiliation throughout his life. In 1971, he entered national party leadership after being invited by Senator Renán Fuentealba to serve as National Secretary of the PDC, at a time of increasing political polarization during the government of President Salvador Allende.

=== Opposition to Pinochet ===
Following the military coup of 11 September 1973, Velasco became an outspoken opponent of the dictatorship led by Augusto Pinochet. Two days after the coup, he was one of the signatories of the public declaration known as the Carta de los Trece (Letter of the Thirteen), which condemned the overthrow of the elected government and denounced the establishment of military rule.

Between 1973 and 1976, Velasco served as managing director of Radio Presidente Balmaceda, a Christian Democratic Party-owned radio station that became one of the first media outlets to report on human rights violations, political repression, detentions, and economic hardship under the dictatorship. Under his leadership, the station broadcast information about the work of human rights organisations and statements by the Catholic Church, including messages from Cardinal Raúl Silva Henríquez that were censored elsewhere.

The station’s editorial line generated internal conflict within the PDC and repeated sanctions by the regime. Radio Balmaceda was closed several times, and in April 1976 Velasco was relegated by the authorities to Putre, in northern Chile. During his forced absence, the radio’s newsroom staff was dismissed, and Velasco was prevented from resuming his post upon his return.

=== Concertación ===
After the restoration of democracy, Velasco was appointed Undersecretary of the Interior in March 1990 by President Patricio Aylwin. Due to administrative requirements, he formally assumed the position before the transfer of power, making him both the first official of the democratic government and the last appointed under the dictatorship.

Velasco remained Undersecretary of the Interior for nine years, serving under Presidents Patricio Aylwin and Eduardo Frei Ruiz-Tagle, and playing a central role in public order and internal security during the transition period. His responsibilities included addressing political violence carried out by armed groups that had not laid down their weapons after the return to democracy.

In 2006, President Michelle Bachelet appointed Velasco Minister of the Interior. His tenure coincided with major social unrest, including the 2006 student protests. Velasco resigned from the position in January 2008 following disagreements within the cabinet, particularly over the financing of the Transantiago public transport system, which he considered constitutionally problematic.

Velasco withdrew from public office after leaving the Bachelet administration but reappeared briefly in public debate during the 2022 constitutional plebiscite, supporting the Reject option.

== Other roles ==
Velasco also served as Ambassador of Chile to Portugal and as President of the National Television Council (CNTV). In addition, he collaborated politically with all four governments of the Concertación coalition and maintained extensive cross-party and institutional networks.

In 1992, while serving as Undersecretary of the Interior, Velasco was involved in a public controversy surrounding the attempted censorship of the British heavy metal band Iron Maiden. He stated that neither he nor the government opposed the band’s entry into Chile, and argued that cultural activity could not be restricted on religious grounds in a secular state.

== Death ==
Velasco died on 24 August 2023 at the age of 87 after a prolonged battle with cancer, at his home in Cachagua, accompanied by his family.

Following his death, the Chilean government declared two days of national mourning in recognition of his role in defending democracy and public order during the transition period.
