= Getting Away with Murder: Benazir Bhutto's Assassination and the Politics of Pakistan =

2013 non-fiction book by Heraldo Muñoz

- Author: Heraldo Muñoz
- Language: English
- Subject: Benazir Bhutto; Assassination; Politics of Pakistan
- Genre: Political history
- Publisher: W. W. Norton & Company
- Publication date: December 2013
- Publication place: United States
- Media type: Print
- Pages: 256
- ISBN: 978-0-393-06291-5

Getting Away with Murder: Benazir Bhutto's Assassination and the Politics of Pakistan is a 2013 non-fiction book by Heraldo Muñoz about the assassination of Pakistani politician Benazir Bhutto and its wider political context. Published by W. W. Norton & Company, the book was written by Muñoz after he led the United Nations commission of inquiry into Bhutto's killing.

The book combines an account of Bhutto's return from exile, her assassination in Rawalpindi in December 2007, and the subsequent investigation with a broader discussion of Pakistan's political instability, the role of the military and intelligence services, and the country's relationship with the United States.

== Synopsis ==
Muñoz begins by recounting how he was asked by Secretary-General Ban Ki-moon to head the United Nations inquiry into Bhutto's murder. He uses that investigation as a framework for revisiting Bhutto's final months, including her negotiations with General Pervez Musharraf, her return to Pakistan in October 2007, the attack on her Karachi procession, and her killing on 27 December 2007.

The book also places the assassination within a longer history of political violence and institutional instability in Pakistan. Its chapters address earlier assassinations, the Bhutto family's political conflicts, United States involvement in Pakistani politics, and the various competing explanations advanced after Bhutto's death.

== Reception ==
In Publishers Weekly, the book was described as a "well-researched account" that provided "valuable insights" into both the investigation and Pakistan's political condition, though the reviewer said it could have been more tightly edited.

Reviewing the book in Library Journal, Nader Entessar called it a "readable and riveting volume" and wrote that policymakers and informed readers would benefit from it.

In The Independent, Arifa Akbar was more critical, writing that the book was "written with all the charisma of a UN report" and arguing that its historical background sometimes slowed the central assassination narrative.

Writing in Lawfare, Bruce Riedel called it an "insightful book" and said it offered a "fascinating document and analysis" of Pakistan's political system and the circumstances surrounding Bhutto's assassination.
