= Osvaldo Puccio =

Chilean politician

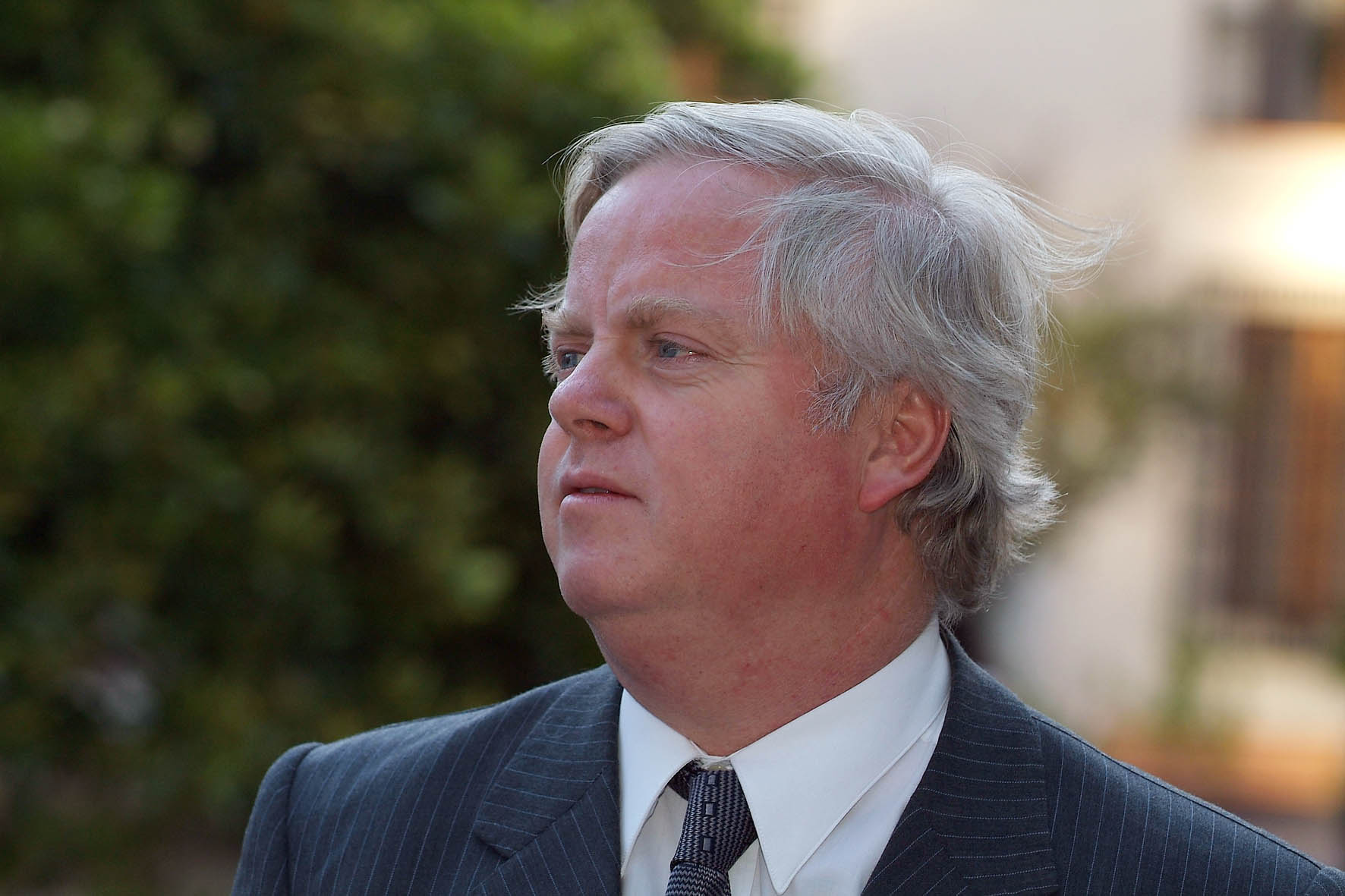

Ministry General Secretariat of Government
- In office 24 May 2005 – 11 March 2006
- President: Ricardo Lagos
- Preceded by: Francisco Vidal
- Succeeded by: Ricardo Lagos Weber

Personal details
- Born: 21 December 1952 (age 73) Santiago, Chile
- Party: Socialist Party; Revolutionary Left Movement
- Spouse: Ingrid Kohlhofer
- Children: Three
- Education: University of Chile (no degree); Humboldt University of Berlin (B.Sc and M.Sc)
- Profession: Economist

Osvaldo Carlos Puccio Huidobro (born 21 December 1952) is a Chilean politician who served as minister.

== Family and education ==
His father was Luis Osvaldo Puccio, personal secretary to Salvador Allende, and his mother was Myriam Huidobro Reichhardt. He completed his primary education at the Escuela República Argentina, Santiago.

He attended the Instituto Nacional in Santiago, where he became a student leader and served as president of the student council in 1969. He studied law at the University of Chile for three years.

He describes himself as an agnostic, despite not following his family's Masonic tradition.

== Political career ==
=== Early career and exile ===
He was a member of the Revolutionary Left Movement (MIR) between 1970 and 1973. During the 1973 Chilean coup d'état, at the age of 21, he was arrested and tortured alongside his father by the repressive agencies of the Chilean military dictatorship, spending seven months imprisoned at the Dawson Island concentration camp.

On 10 September 1974, he went into exile in Romania and later moved to East Germany, where he earned a doctorate in philosophy from Humboldt University of Berlin. In recognition of his academic performance, he was awarded a trip to the Soviet Union in July 1977. The Stasi, which kept him under surveillance, noted in one of its reports that his frequent trips abroad caused resentment among his fellow Chilean exiles, who were not permitted to travel. In Potsdam, Puccio Huidobro reunited with future President Michelle Bachelet, whom he had known during their secondary school years. He remained in East Germany until 1984, when he returned to Chile.

=== Concertación era ===
He joined the Socialist Party of Chile and, following the end of the rule of Augusto Pinochet, held several positions in the governments of the Concertación. During the presidency of Eduardo Frei Ruiz-Tagle, he served as ambassador to Austria from 1994 to 2000, while also being concurrently accredited to Slovakia (1995–2000), Bosnia and Herzegovina (1997–2000), and Slovenia (1997–2000).

Later, President Ricardo Lagos appointed him ambassador to Brazil, a position he held from 2003 to 2005.

Following the appointment of Francisco Vidal as Minister of the Interior, Lagos appointed him Minister Secretary-General of Government—the government's official spokesperson—on 25 May 2005. His appointment drew attention because he presented a marked contrast to his predecessor, who was notably tall and spoke with a powerful voice, whereas Puccio was of short stature and had a distinctive speaking voice.

President Michelle Bachelet appointed him ambassador to Spain in 2006. He resigned in September 2008 for personal reasons and to pursue activities in the private sector. The following month, he became advisory director for Latin America at the Spanish construction group Acciona.
