= Guido Girardi =

Chilean politician

Guido Girardi Lavín
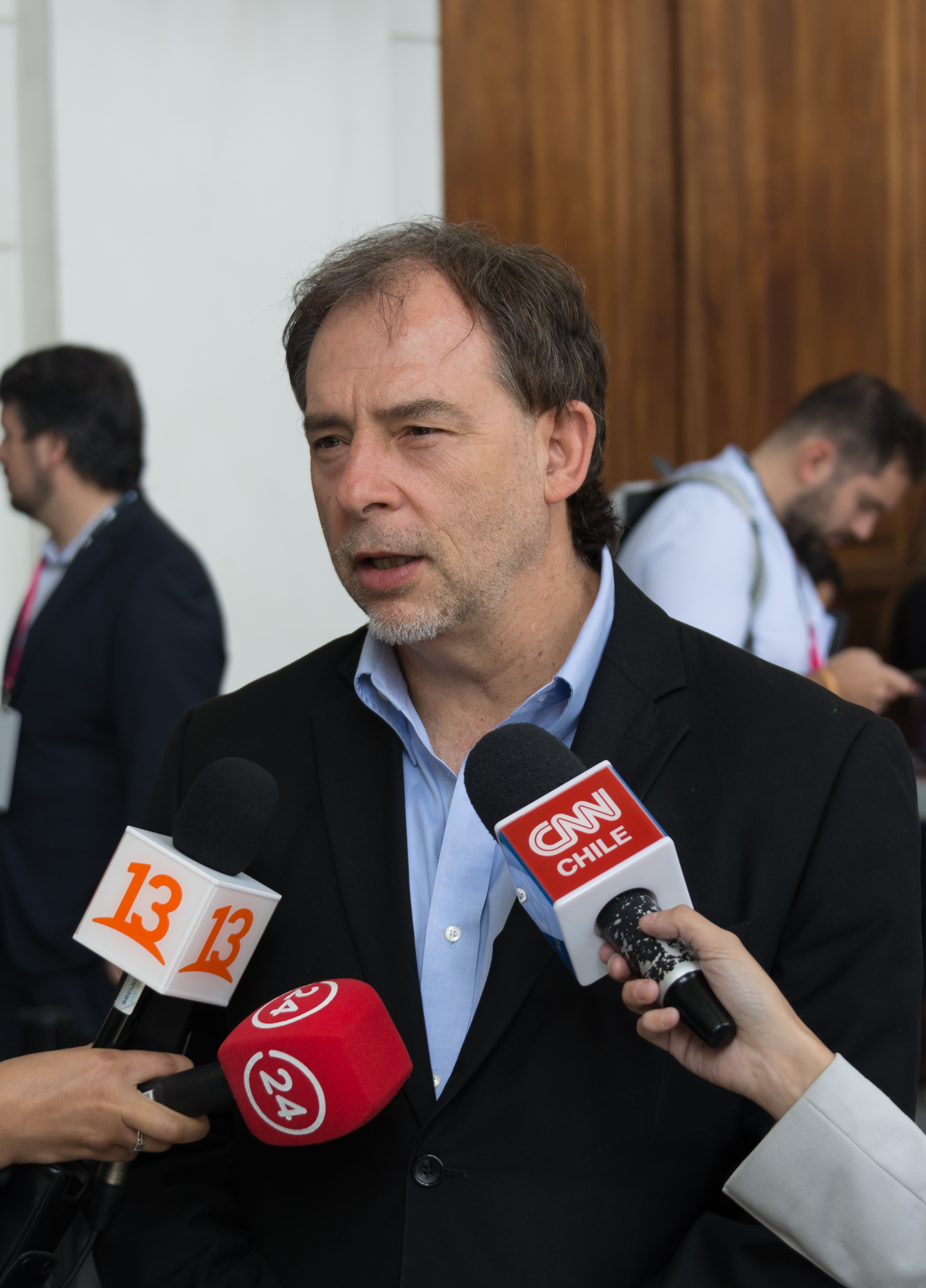
- Girardi in 2019

Senate of Chile
- In office 11 March 2006 – 11 March 2022
- Preceded by: Andrés Zaldívar
- Succeeded by: Dissolution of the district

President of the Senate of Chile
- In office 15 March 2011 – 20 March 2012
- Preceded by: Jorge Pizarro
- Succeeded by: Camilo Escalona

Member of the Chamber of Deputies of Chile
- In office 11 March 1994 – 11 March 2006
- Preceded by: Hernán Bosselin
- Succeeded by: Guido Girardi Brière

Personal details
- Born: 24 January 1961 (age 65) Santiago, Chile
- Party: Party for Democracy
- Spouse: Paula Echeñique (m. 1994)
- Children: 4
- Education: University of Chile
- Occupation: Physician, politician
- Website: guidogirardi.cl

Guido Girardi Lavín (born 24 January 1961) is a Chilean doctor and politician. He was a senator in district no. 7 for Santiago Poniente. He previously served as the president of that chamber.

He usually takes progressive stances on social issues, such as defense of the environment and a critical stance against private healthcare.

He has also been involved in several controversies in Chile. He agitated a legal and social polemic for filing a complaint in November 2008 against two police officers who allegedly "disrespected" the senator while writing him a speeding ticket. Both officers were retired from the police. He had used false bills from a nonexistent company, Publicam, in order to justify his campaign expenses to the Servicio de Impuestos Internos (Internal Tax Service).

== Parliamentary work ==
During his work as a parliamentarian, until 2020 Senator Girardi has been the main author of 17 Chilean laws passed, in addition to 31 other bills under discussion. Among these, law No. 19,680 enacted in 2000 prohibited the sale of fireworks to the general public and the regulation the use of fireworks in public spaces. This law is a response to the constant tragedies in which children and young people were severely burned due to their manipulation. The law had a positive effect, and by 2004 the cases of burned children decreased by 85%.

In 2009, the "Guarantee Check Law" was approved, which prevents private health services from requiring a check to guarantee payment for any medical benefit received by patients.

In 2010, Law No. 20,413 was enacted, which "[establishes] the Principle of Universal Organ Donation and Reception", which modifies the existing law on organ donation in force in Chile. This law subsequently received an amendment in 2017 with law No. 20, 988 that expanded the cross-donation of organs between living people.

Also in 2012, the "Law on the nutritional composition of food and its advertising" was approved, known as the "Food Labeling Law", one of its main peculiarities being to force the industry to incorporate icons Black octagonal in the packaging of processed food products that indicate if this food contains sugar, saturated fat, salt and / or calories above those recommended by a technical table of experts.

In 2013, the "Law that Sanctions the Marketing of cured thread" was enacted, due to the constant number of cases involving serious injuries caused by strands of string covered with ground glass.

Another measure approved by law is to eliminate the requirement for the consent of the guardians of young people over 14 years of age so that they can undergo the HIV detection test, a project whose purpose is to establish greater social flexibility in the detection of the virus in Chile, which facilitates the pandemic control processes.

In 2015, bill No. 20,879 "Sanctioning the Transportation of Waste to Clandestine Landfills" was approved. The project modifies the current Traffic Law, adding fines to the transporters of these wastes, and gives powers and responsibilities to the Municipalities of Chile on the matter of the collection, transportation, and disposal of waste.

Due to the concern for animal welfare that has arisen in Chilean society, in 2017, Law No. 21,020 of 2017 was enacted "Responsible Ownership of Pets and Companion Animals", known publicly as "Ley Cholito". Giradi was one of the promoters of the bill motion, along with Mariano Ruiz-Esquide and Carlos Kuschel.

Based on international concerns from academia due to the scientific advancement of neurotechnologies, Senator Girardi together with Spanish neuroscientist Rafael Yuste —ideaire of the BRAIN Initiative— together with other specialists on the subject presented on 7 October 2020, two bills that seek to establish and protect the neurorights —the first is a constitutional reform that seeks to integrate mental privacy as a state guarantee, and the second seeks to define and protect the physical and psychological integrity of individuals. The project has been positively received by foreign institutions and countries; the UN, OECD, and UNESCO are observing the development of this bill, while the Secretary of State for Digitalization and Artificial Intelligence of Spain has shown interest in the progress of this project.

=== Congreso Futuro ===
Congreso Futuro ("Future Congress" or "Congress of the Future" in English) is an annual event originally organized by the National Congress and currently directed by the Fundación Encuentros del Futuro. The event began its activities in early December 2011 and has been held annually since then. The first version was organized by Senator Girardi and Deputy Patricio Melero (UDI). Since then, the activity has welcomed Nobel laureates, scientists, researchers, philosophers, historians, politicians, activists, pioneers, among other types of specialists and connoisseurs. It has had more than 45,000 attendees and more than 1 million viewers for Streaming services.

The main objective of the Congreso Futuro is to create spaces for dialogue between science, decision-makers, and citizens themselves. Given the impact and reception of the Future Congress within the Chilean scientific and social discussion, Senator Girardi headed the organization that works in the management and expansion of this Congress to the regions of the country, and also seeks to replicate the event abroad.

Currently, the Future Congress is one of the largest science communication events in Latin America.
