= Ricardo Lagos Weber =

Chilean politician

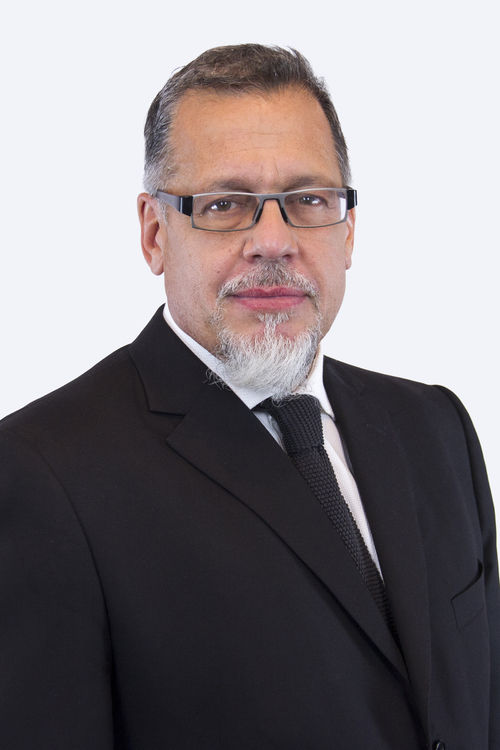

Member of the Senate
- In office 11 March 2010 – 11 March 2026
- Preceded by: Nelson Ávila
- Constituency: 6th Circumscription

President of the Senate
- In office 15 March 2016 – 21 March 2017
- Preceded by: Patricio Walker
- Succeeded by: Andrés Zaldívar

Minister Secretary-General of Government
- In office 11 March 2006 – 6 December 2007
- President: Michelle Bachelet
- Preceded by: Osvaldo Puccio
- Succeeded by: Francisco Vidal

Personal details
- Born: 21 February 1962 (age 64) Chapel Hill, North Carolina, United States
- Party: Party for Democracy (1987−present)
- Spouse: Gloria Peña
- Children: Two
- Parent(s): Ricardo Lagos; Carmen Weber
- Education: University of Chile; University of Sussex; University of Cambridge
- Occupation: Politician
- Profession: Economist

Ricardo Andrés Lagos Weber (born 21 February 1962), son of former Chilean president Ricardo Lagos, is a politician who served as the Ministry General Secretariat of Government of Chile in the administration of former President Michelle Bachelet after having worked for Bachelet's 2005-2006 campaign.

He is trained in law and economics, and has served the majority of his government career in economic positions. He was also an organizer and the senior representative for Chile at the Annual Meeting of APEC held in Chile in 2004, in addition to being one of the architects of the free trade agreements that Chile signed with the United States (United States-Chile Free Trade Agreement) and the European Union (European Union Association Agreement) as the head of the Foreign Ministry's Department of Trade Policy.

He is a member of the Party for Democracy (PPD). Between March 2016 and March 2017 he was President of the Senate of Chile.

== Early life ==
Lagos Weber was born in the United States, the son of then-University of North Carolina at Chapel Hill professor and now former president Ricardo Lagos Escobar and ex-wife Carmen Weber Aliaga. Due to the constant traveling caused by the exile of his father during the military dictatorship of Augusto Pinochet, Lagos Weber was forced to complete his studies in eight different schools, finishing his secondary education at Colegio San Agustin. He completed his undergraduate studies at the Universidad de Chile School of Law, receiving his Bachelor of Law and Social Sciences degree in 1985.

He continued his education at the University of Sussex in England, where he obtained a Masters in Economic Development at the Institute of Development Studies. His postgraduate thesis was about flexibility in the labor market. He began work on his doctorate in Economics at the University of Cambridge with a President of the Republic Scholarship (Beca Presidente de la República), which he applied for in 1990, but he returned to Chile to work in the Chilean section of the International Labour Organization (ILO) and did not finish the doctorate program.

== Political career ==
In 1995, he became the Chilean representative to the APEC forum, conducting trade negotiations on economic cooperation. That same year he was part of a diplomatic team negotiating a free trade agreement between Canada and Chile. Lagoes Weber continued to negotiate trade agreements over the next few years. Since the end of the 1990s, Lagos Weber served as the head of the department of Trade Policy of the World Trade Organization, under the Chilean Foreign Ministry's General Directorate of International Economic Relations (DIRECON). In October, 1999, Lagos Weber left his WTO job to serve a major role in the presidential campaign of his father Ricardo Lagos. In 2000, he traveled with President Lagos to Berlin to act as a panelist at the "Third Way" conference, speaking for Chile and his father's administration. He subsequently became Director of Multilateral Economic Affairs in 2002, heading the General Directorate of International Economic Relations.

Lagos Weber served as Chilean high representative for APEC during the summits of 2003 and 2004, and was the "main organizer" of the conference when Chile hosted APEC. To this end, he was also a Senior Official for Chile, and the president of APEC's Senior Officials Meeting II prior to the conference. Lagos Weber was a candidate for the congressional elections in December 2005, but withdrew his candidacy in August based on polls that suggested that, even with a 45% showing, he would not secure a seat under Chile's electoral rules.

=== Ministership ===
Lagos Weber was a top campaign strategist in Michelle Bachelet's victorious 2005 presidential campaign. In January, before her own inauguration, President-elect Bachelet sent Lagos Weber as Chile's representative to the inauguration of Evo Morales in Bolivia, signaling an intent to improve the two countries' strained relations. In late January, 2006, Lagos Weber was named Ministry General Secretariat of Government, essentially the presidential spokesman, by President Michelle Bachelet, and he took office on March 11.

In 2007, Bachelet announced that any cabinet members seeking to run in the upcoming elections would have to announce their resignation by January, 2008. With the popularity of the Bachelet administration at a low, and the Concertación's support suffering, Lagos Weber announced his resignation on December 6, 2007, to make his candidacy for the Senate of Chile for the district of the Valparaíso Region in the December 2008 election. Seen as a rising star, often aided by his recognizability as the former president's son and a visible spokesman to the current president, the upcoming election takes on increased importance as the Concertación faces the risk of losing its dominant role in the government. He was replaced by Francisco Vidal (also from the PPD), who had already served in that post for the administration of Ricardo Lagos Escobar.

=== Senate ===
Lagos Weber is a member of the Senate of Chile for district V Valparaíso Region. On 15 March 2016 he was elected President of the Senate, he succeeded Patricio Walker. On 21 March 2017 he was succeeded by Andrés Zaldívar.
