= Carmen Weber =

Wife of Ricardo Lagos

Georgina del Carmen Weber Aliaga (21 February 1941 in Valdivia – August 8, 2007 in Concón) was the first wife of Chilean ex-president Ricardo Lagos and mother of politician Ricardo Lagos Weber.

Carmen Weber met and married Ricardo Lagos in 1961, with whom he had two children: Ricardo and Ximena. After Lagos obtained his Ph.D. in the U.S., he annulled this marriage in 1969 (divorce was not legal in Chile until 2004.) He also obtained custody of his two children. The cause of the rupture was her severe bipolar disorder.

She became famous during the run-up to the 1988 national plebiscite when she supported General Augusto Pinochet, and spoke negatively of her former husband during an interview that was aired on September 30 of that year. That interview was considered the single most damaging moment against the Pinochet option as Chileans perceived her as vindictive and bitter, and sympathy went to the husband rather than her.

As a consequence of an accidental fire at her home on May 18, 2007, she suffered deep respiratory damage which eventually resulted in her serious injury. She died at her home in the city of Concón.
