= United Nations Special Envoy on Climate Change =

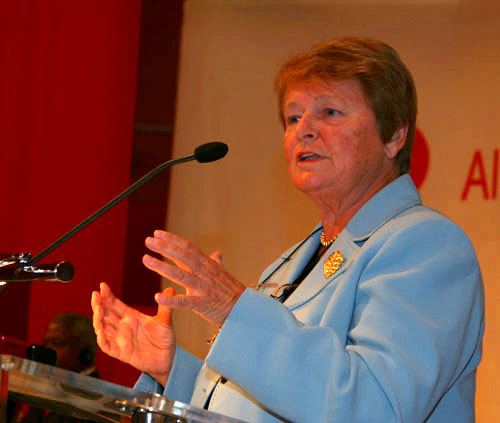
Gro Harlem Brundtland

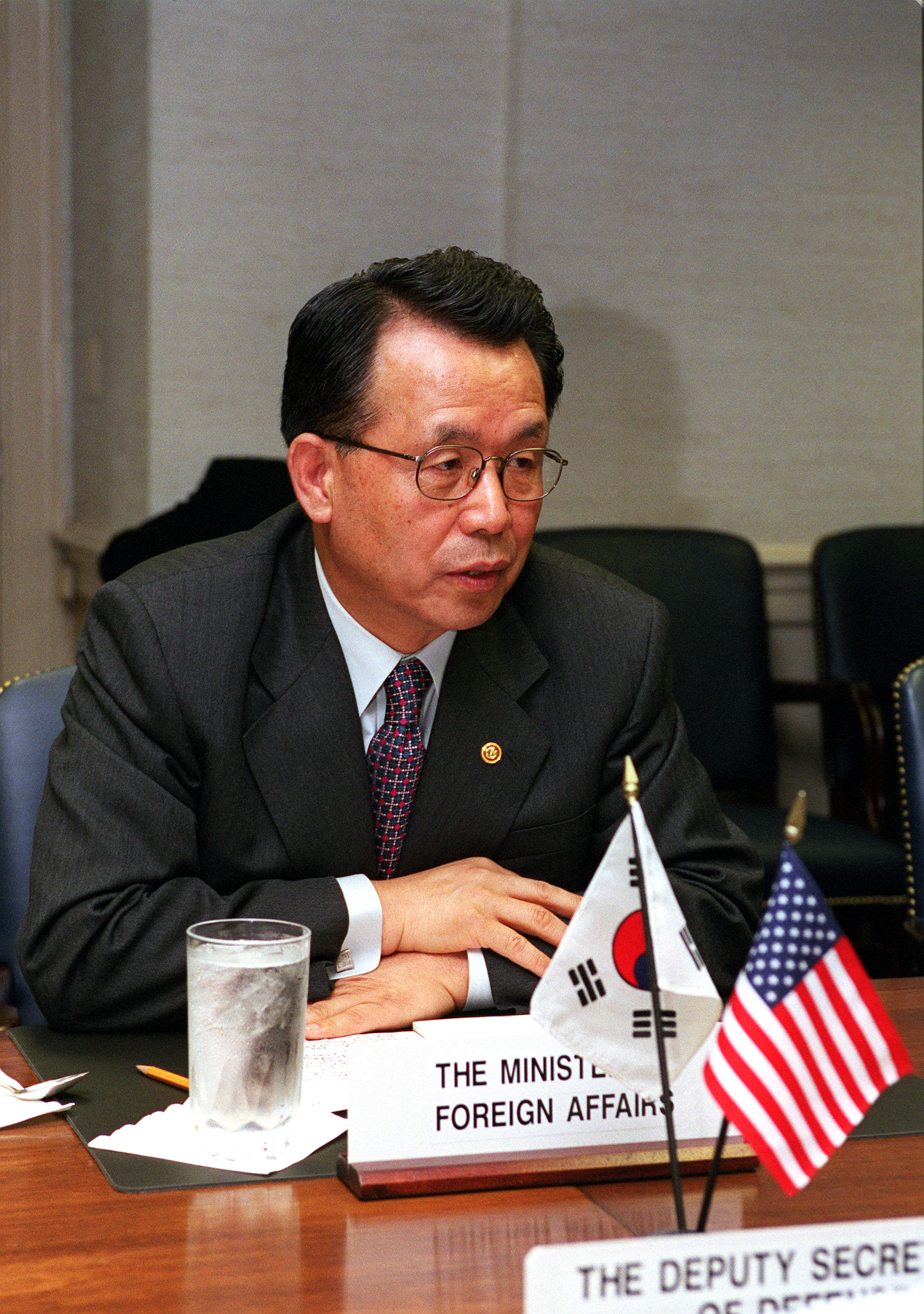
Han Seung Soo

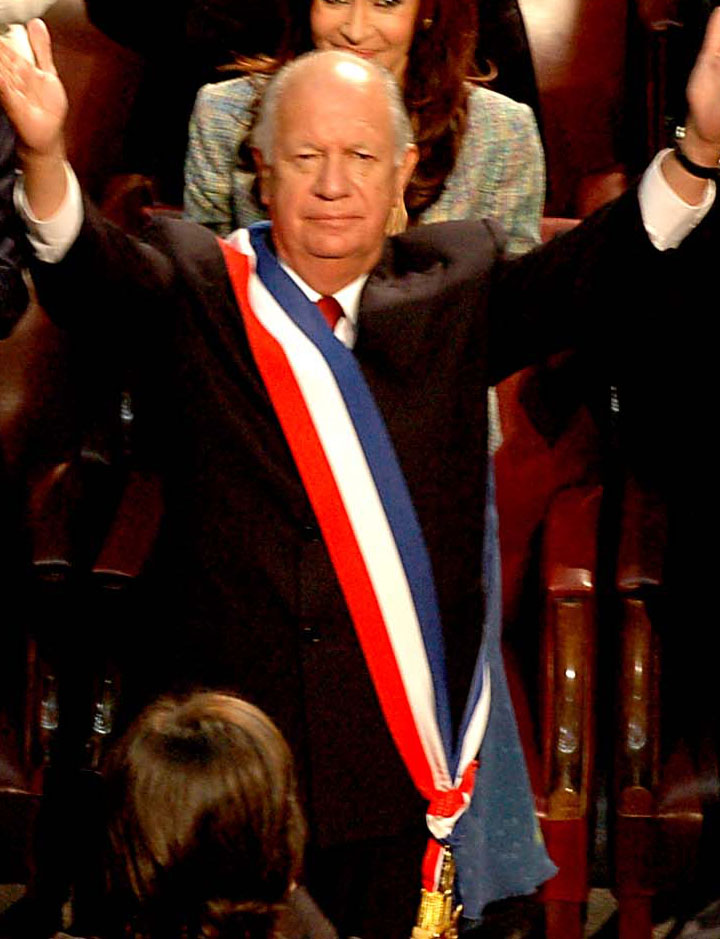
Ricardo Lagos

Three United Nations Special Envoys on Climate Change were appointed by former Secretary-General Ban Ki-moon on May 1, 2007. The envoys engaged in consultations with Governments and other organizations in order to assist the Secretary-General to progress the international negotiations towards a post-Kyoto climate change treaty.

Gro Harlem Brundtland is a former Prime Minister of Norway and former chair of the World Commission on Environment and Development. Han Seung Soo served as President of the United Nations General Assembly in 2001, and also as Minister of Foreign Affairs of the Republic of Korea. Ricardo Lagos, former President of Chile is the third Special Envoy.

The appointment of Lagos was controversial among Chilean environmental groups who questioned his track record on the matter, claiming that he 'showed an utter lack of consideration for the environment, promoted policies against environmental sustainability and favored the interests of big economic groups, even defending crimes against nature internationally'.

Mark Carney was appointed as a Special Envoy for Climate Change in 2019.

== See also ==
- Kyoto Protocol
