= Heraldo Muñoz =

Chilean political scientist, academic, diplomat and politician

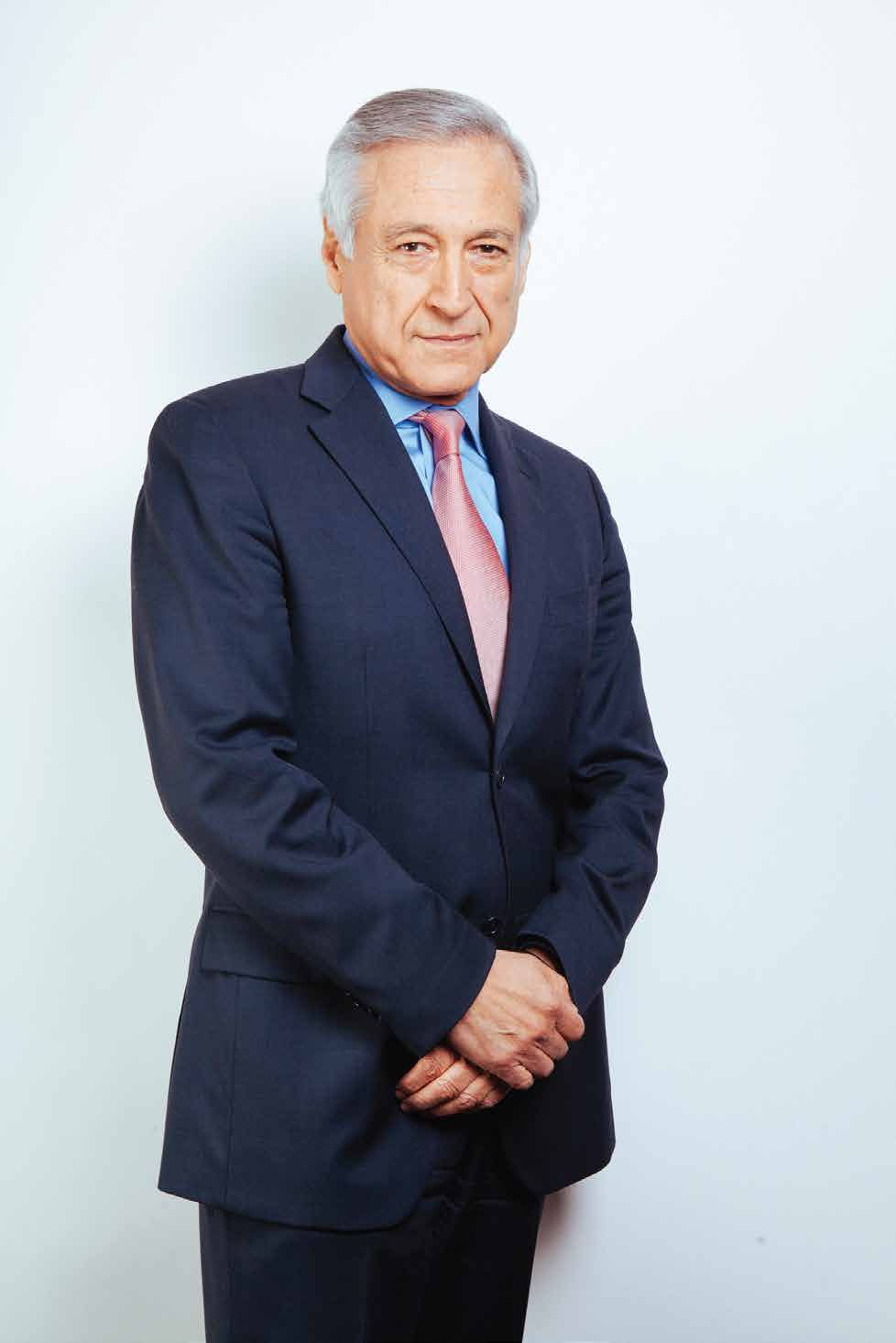

Foreign Affairs Minister of Chile
- In office 11 March 2014 – 11 March 2018
- Appointed by: Michelle Bachelet
- Preceded by: Alfredo Moreno Charme
- Succeeded by: Roberto Ampuero

Permanent Representative of Chile to the United Nations
- In office 2003–2010
- Appointed by: Ricardo Lagos
- Preceded by: Juan Gabriel Valdés
- Succeeded by: Octavio Errázuriz Guilisasti

Minister Secretary-General of Government
- In office 7 January 2002 – 3 March 2003
- Preceded by: Claudio Huepe
- Succeeded by: Francisco Vidal

Ambassador of Chile to Brazil
- In office 1994–1998
- Appointed by: Eduardo Frei Ruiz-Tagle
- Succeeded by: Juan Martabit Scaff

Permanent Representative of Chile to the Organization of American States
- In office 1990–1994
- Appointed by: Patricio Aylwin

Personal details
- Born: 22 July 1948 (age 78) Santiago, Chile
- Party: Socialist Party (1972–1988) (2023–present); Party for Democracy (1988–2023)
- Education: SUNY Oswego; Universidad Católica de Chile; University of Denver
- Occupation: Diplomat, politician

Heraldo Muñoz Valenzuela (born July 22, 1948) is a Chilean political scientist, academic, diplomat and politician; the former Minister of Foreign Affairs of Chile under President Michelle Bachelet; former Assistant Secretary General, Assistant Administrator, and Regional Director for Latin America and the Caribbean of the United Nations Development Programme; and the former Chilean Ambassador to the United Nations, to Brazil, and to the Organization of American States.

== Early life and career ==
Heraldo Muñoz was born in Santiago on July 22, 1948. After graduating from Liceo de Aplicación, an all-boys public high school, he attended the University of Chile where he studied English. After the first year, he left to major in political science at the State University of New York (SUNY), Oswego, thanks to a scholarship from the Institute of International Education.

After gaining his B.A. at SUNY, he obtained a Diploma in international relations from the Catholic University of Chile (1975, graduated with honors), followed by a Masters (M.A.) and a Doctorate (Ph.D.) in international relations from the Josef Korbel School of International Studies at the University of Denver, Colorado (1978). He was a doctoral fellow at the Brookings Institution, Washington, D.C. (1977), where he wrote his Ph.D. dissertation. He received fellowships from Resources for the Future, the Ford Foundation, the Tinker Foundation, the Twentieth Century Fund, and the MacArthur Foundation.

Upon completion of his doctorate, Muñoz went back to Chile and returned to work as an academic at the University of Chile's Institute of International Studies, having started there as professor in 1974. He taught, researched and published extensively in the field of international relations in this period; and also founded and directed the Program on Latin American Foreign Policies (PROSPEL), a foreign policy research institute which published annual reports on the foreign policies of Latin American governments (1984-1990).

In 1987, he co-founded Chile's Party for Democracy (PPD), and participated in the Executive Committee of the "No" Campaign which defeated Augusto Pinochet in the 1988 plebiscite. Prior to that, he was a member of Chile's Socialist Party (1983-1986), and served as secretary of foreign relations and member of its central committee; he also ran as candidate for undersecretary general on a list headed by Ricardo Lagos.

== Diplomatic career ==
Once democracy returned to Chile, Muñoz was named Ambassador Permanent Representative for Chile to the Organization of American States by President Patricio Aylwin (1990-1994); during his mission, he sat on the Executive Committee of the Global Environmental Partnership with U.S. Senator Al Gore. During the administration of Eduardo Frei Ruiz-Tagle, Muñoz served as Ambassador to Brazil (1994-1998); during this mission, he participated in negotiations to end hostilities between Peru and Ecuador. President Ricardo Lagos appointed Muñoz as Deputy Minister of Foreign Relations (March 2000); and in January 2002, as Minister Secretary General of Government. In 2003, Lagos named him Chile's Ambassador Permanent Representative to the United Nations.

=== United Nations career ===
When Muñoz became ambassador to the UN, Chile was a non-permanent member of the Security Council (2003-2004); hence, Muñoz served as Security Council President (January 2004), a position that is rotated monthly. While on the Council, Muñoz also presided the Al-Qaida/Taliban Sanctions Committee, traveling to countries like Afghanistan, Cambodia, Indonesia, and Iran, in line with Security Council resolutions, to supervise the implementation of arms embargoes, asset freezes, and travel bans of those groups. In 2008, the New York Times featured his life and work in The Saturday Profile.

In February 2009, Secretary-General Ban Ki-moon appointed him as head of a UN Commission of Inquiry to investigate the assassination of former Prime Minister of Pakistan Benazir Bhutto, in response to a request made by Pakistani President Asif Ali Zardari. The report of the findings of the Commission, delivered in April 2010, resulted in the reopening of the case in the courts of Pakistan and the subsequent arrests of several high level individuals.

Other positions Muñoz held while Ambassador to the UN were: chairman of the Peacebuilding Commission; facilitator of the Security Council reform consultations (2007-2008); Vice President of the General Assembly's 61st Session (2006-2007); and member of the Human Rights Commission reform consultations (today known as the Human Rights Council).

As Chairman of the Peacebuilding Commission, in 2009 he obtained a donation of the funds collected through author's rights from a new digital version of John Lennon's song, "Give Peace a Chance" by his widow, artist Yoko Ono. Muñoz and Ono also collaborated in an initiative for Autism Speaks: Ono donated a work of art for an auction to benefit the efforts of that organization on the occasion of the United Nations Autism Awareness Day, an event that was sponsored by the Mission of Chile to the UN in 2009.

In May 2010, Muñoz was appointed by UN Secretary-General Ban Ki-moon as Assistant Secretary General, Assistant Administrator, and Regional Director for Latin America and the Caribbean of the United Nations Development Programme.

=== Ministry of Foreign Affairs ===
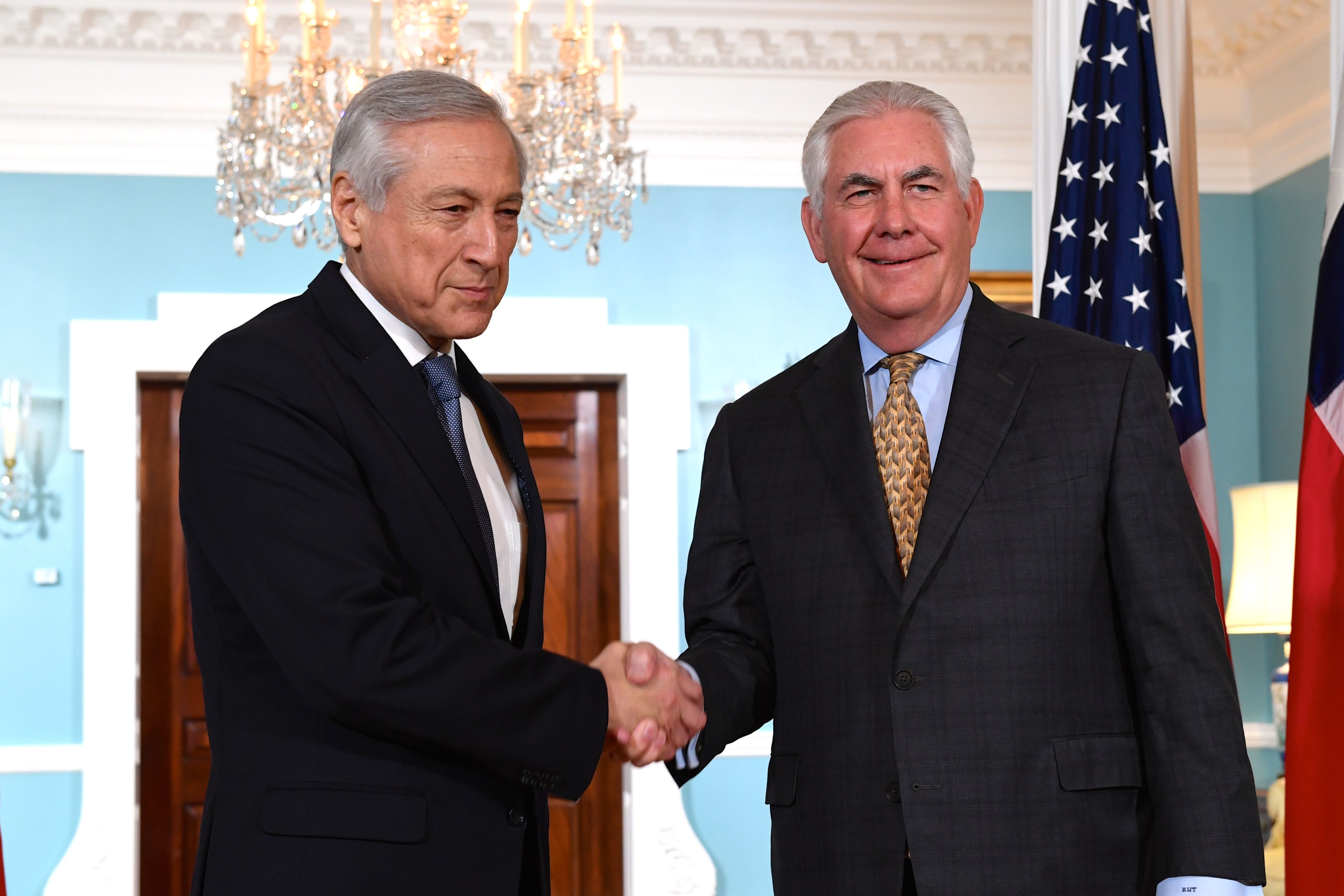
Muñoz with then-United States Secretary of State Rex Tillerson

President Michelle Bachelet named him Minister of Foreign Affairs of Chile in 2014. As such, he led Chile in its response to a case presented by Bolivia at the International Court of Justice, intended to force Chile to negotiate a sovereign access to the Pacific Ocean] for Bolivia (see Bolivia v. Chile). Chile won the case by an overwhelming majority of the Court. Likewise during Muñoz's tenure, the Foreign Ministry elaborated a National Action Plan for Human Rights and Business, which was presented to President Bachelet in 2017. Also that year, Venezuela's political opposition to the government of Nicolás Maduro requested that Muñoz represent them, along with Foreign Minister of Mexico Luis Videgaray Caso, in negotiations held in the Dominican Republic, to set conditions for the then upcoming presidential elections: these efforts were eventually unsuccessful due to the intransigence of Venezuelan authorities and disagreements within the opposition. Furthermore, by invitation from the then US Secretary of State John Kerry, Muñoz joined an international campaign to protect the ocean. As a result of this involvement, Chile turned 1.4 million square kilometers of its waters into marine protected areas, becoming a world leader in ocean protection. Muñoz also achieved -after many failed attempts by previous governments- congressional approval of the bill for the modernization of the Foreign Ministry; the bill was promulgated by President Bachelet on March 7, 2018. Muñoz also led the elaboration of an agenda for Chile's foreign policy of the future entitled Política Exterior 2030. Finally, Muñoz created and promoted the concept of "convergence in diversity" between the two integration mechanisms for the region, the Pacific Alliance and Mercosur.

== Career after office ==
In 2018 the Pew Charitable Foundation and the Bertarelli Foundation named Muñoz Ambassador of the Ocean.

In 2018, Muñoz was elected President of the Party for Democracy (PPD). His term ended in August 2021.

In September 2019 Muñoz was named Director of the Prince Albert II of Monaco Foundation.

Muñoz planned to run in the 2021 Chilean presidential election, but ended up dropping out in May 2021.

== Books and publications ==
- A Solitary War: A Diplomat's Chronicle of the Iraq War and Its Lessons, Fulcrum Publishing, 2008 (it has been translated into Spanish).
- The Dictator's Shadow: Life Under Augusto Pinochet, Basic Books, 2008 (it has been translated into Spanish and Portuguese). Newsweek said about it: Muñoz wrote "an insightful and poignant new personal memoir of the Pinochet years." The Washington Post called it "a meticulous and vivid new book... Muñoz delivers a compelling, personal account of life in a police state and a strong reminder of how far Chile has come": and the paper also listed The Dictator's Shadow among the best books of 2008. In 2009, Duke University presented him with the WOLA-Duke award for the best non-fiction book on the subjects of human rights, democracy, and social justice.
- Getting Away with Murder: Benazir Bhutto's Assassination and the Politics of Pakistan, W.W. Norton & Company, 2013, a book based on the aforementioned UN investigation over which Muñoz presided.

Other books written or edited by Muñoz are:

- Democracy Rising: Assessing the Global Challenges (Heraldo Muñoz, editor; Lynn Rienner Publishers, 2006)
- Globalización XXI: América Latina y los desafíos del nuevo milenio (Heraldo Muñoz, editor; Aguilar, 2000)
- A Nova Política Internacional (Heraldo Muñoz; Fundaçao Alexandre de Gusmao, 1996)
- Latin American Nations in World Politics (Heraldo Muñoz and Joseph Tulchin, editors; Westview Press, 1996)
- Política Internacional de los Nuevos Tiempos (Heraldo Muñoz; Editorial Los Andes, 1996)
- The Future of the Organization of American States (Heraldo Muñoz and Viron L. Vaky; The Twentieth Century Fund Press, 1993)
- Difficult Liaison: Trade and the Environment in the Americas (Heraldo Muñoz and Robin Rosenberg, editors; Transaction Publishers, 1993)
- El Fin del Fantasma: Las relaciones interamericanas después de la guerra fría (Heraldo Muñoz, editor; Ediciones Pedagógicas Chilenas S.A., 1992)
- Environment and Diplomacy in the Americas (Heraldo Muñoz, editor; Lynn Reinner Publishers, 1992)
- Chile: Política Exterior para la Democracia (Heraldo Muñoz, editor; Pehuén, 1989)
- Una Amistad Esquiva (Heraldo Muñoz y Carlos Portales; Pehuén, 1987)
- Latin American Views of US Policy (Robert Wesson and Heraldo Muñoz, editors; Praeger, 1986)
- Las Relaciones Exteriores del Gobierno Militar Chileno (Heraldo Muñoz; Las Ediciones del Ornitorrinco y Prospel-CERC, 1986)
- Crisis y Desarrollo Alternativo en Latinoamérica (Heraldo Muñoz, editor; Editorial Aconcagua, 1985)
- From Dependency to Development: Strategies to Overcome Underdevelopment and Inequality (Heraldo Muñoz, editor; Westview Press, 1981)
- Desarrollo energético en América Latina y la economía mundial (Heraldo Muñoz, editor; Editorial Universitaria, 1980)

Duke University holds in the Rubenstein Library a collection of many of the documents of Heraldo Muñoz, A guide to the Heraldo Muñoz Papers, 1963-2013 and undated.

Honors and Awards

- Distinguished Alumnus Award, Josef Korbel School of International Studies, University of Denver (1991)
- Distinguished Alumnus Award, State University of New York (1994)
- Doctor of Humane Letters, State University of New York (1995)
- Doctor of the University, University of Ottawa, Canada (2009)
- Doctor of Humane Letters, Pace University (2009)
- Grand Cross Isabel la Católica (2014)

== See also ==
- List of foreign ministers in 2017
- List of current foreign ministers

Political offices
Preceded by Claudio Huepe	Minister Secretary-General of Government; 2002 – 2003	Succeeded by Francisco Vidal
Preceded by Alfredo Moreno Charme	Minister for Foreign Affairs; 2014 – 2018	Succeeded by Roberto Ampuero
Diplomatic posts
Preceded by Juan Gabriel Valdés	Permanent Representative of Chile to the United Nations; 2003 – 2010	Succeeded by Octavio Errázuriz
