= Osvaldo Artaza =

Chilean politician

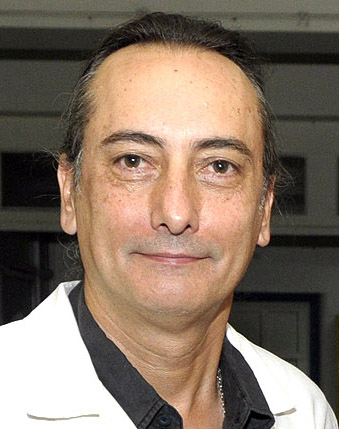

Minister of Health
- In office 7 January 2002 – 3 March 2003
- President: Ricardo Lagos
- Preceded by: Michelle Bachelet
- Succeeded by: Pedro García Aspillaga

Personal details
- Born: 5 August 1955 (age 71) Santiago, Chile
- Spouse: María Elena Varela
- Children: Three
- Education: University of Chile (B.Sc / M.Sc)
- Profession: Physician

Osvaldo Enrique Artaza Barrios (born 5 July 1955) is a Chilean physician who has served as minister of health administration.

He gained national public recognition while serving as the hospital's spokesperson during the first successful surgical separation of Chilean conjoined twins, an operation that received extensive media coverage.

During his tenure, he introduced management reforms at the hospital and promoted public fundraising campaigns to finance new facilities, while maintaining a strong presence on Chilean radio and television.

== Professional career ==
The son of a physician, he became active as a student leader within the Federation of Private School Students (FUEP), advocating educational reforms aimed at broadening access to elite schools for students from lower-income backgrounds.

During the period of the Popular Unity government, in coordination with the Federation of Secondary Students of Santiago (FESES), he helped organize several demonstrations opposing the National Unified School (ENU) education reform promoted by President Salvador Allende.

He studied medicine at the University of Chile, later specializing in pediatrics, paediatric cardiology, and health-care management. He also earned a master's degree in Health Institution Management from the same university.

He served as a rural general practitioner and director of the Mulchén Hospital. After four years, he resigned following disagreements with local authorities under the military regime, arising from his involvement in community, social and cultural initiatives in Mulchén, including founding and directing the newspaper El Amanecer de Mulchén, directing the theatre group Mulchén, hosting a programme on Radio Lincoyán, and participating in other community development activities.

Following the restoration of democracy, he was named an honorary citizen of Mulchén. After completing his postgraduate studies, he undertook clinical practice and research, before becoming director of the Luis Calvo Mackenna Hospital.
