= Lissette García Bustamante =

Chilean social worker, lawyer and politician

Lissette Ivonne García Bustamante
- Bustamante in 2006
- Born: February 26, 1963; Concepción, Chile
- Education: University of Concepción; Universidad Central de Chile; University of Chile
- Occupations: Social worker, lawyer, politician
- Known for: Deputy director of the National Women's Service; Undersecretary of Social Security
- Political party: Christian Democratic Party (Chile)

Lissette Ivonne García Bustamante (Concepción, February 26, 1963) is a Chilean social worker, lawyer and politician, member of the Christian Democratic Party (PDC). She served as deputy director of the National Women's Service (Sernam) and as undersecretary of Social Security, during the governments of Presidents Ricardo Lagos and Michelle Bachelet, respectively.

== Education ==
She completed her degree in Social Work from the University of Concepción. Later, she pursued Law from the Universidad Central de Chile and graduated as a lawyer. She went on to complete a postgraduate course in Social Program Management from the Faculty of Social Sciences at the University of Chile.

== Public career ==
Her professional development has been linked to public management, mainly in the field of social policies.

From 1991 to 1994, she served as the national director of the Regional Area of the Integra Foundation in the Biobío region. Later, from 1994 to 2000, she worked as the National Coordinator of the Women's Rights Information Centers Program (Cidem) at the National Women's Service (Sernam).

During the administration of President Ricardo Lagos, from 2000 to 2001, she was head of the Department for the Protection of Rights of the National Service for Minors (Sename), and between 2001 and 2002, she was head of the Department of Regional Development of the National Council for the Control of Narcotics (Conace).

In her later years, she was appointed as the deputy director of Sernam by Lagos. In this role, she served as Chile's representative to the Organization of American States (OAS) and the Inter-American Commission of Women, where she was recognized as an expert on women's political participation in Latin America. She held that position until July 15, 2004, when she resigned to run for the position of mayor of Estación Central in the municipal elections of that year.

She is a board member of Art-America cultural foundation and Abogadas Pro Familia law firm.
