= Roberto Ampuero =

Chilean politician and writer

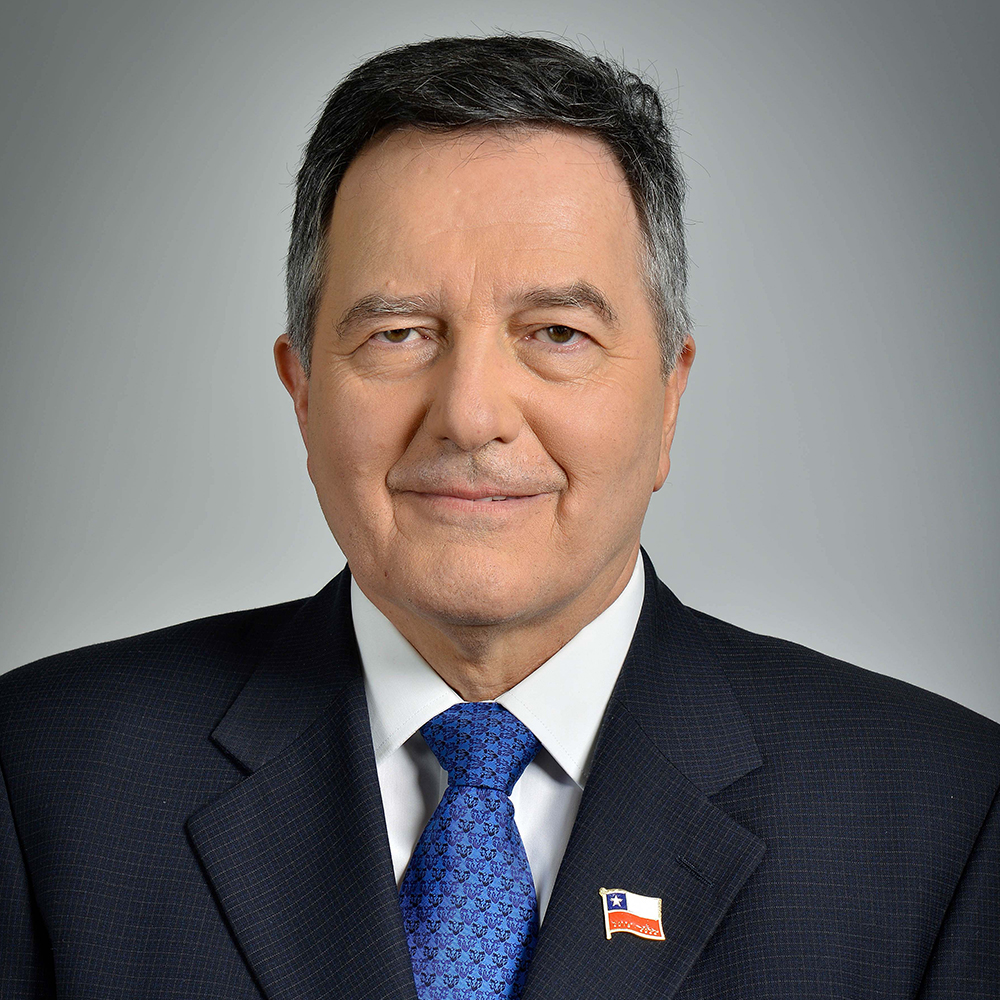

Minister of Foreign Affairs of Chile
- In office March 11, 2018 – June 13, 2019
- Appointed by: Sebastián Piñera
- Preceded by: Heraldo Muñoz
- Succeeded by: Teodoro Ribera

Personal details
- Born: 20 February 1953 (age 73) Valparaíso, Chile
- Occupation: Novelist
- Website: elcasoneruda.cl

Roberto Ampuero (born 20 February 1953 in Valparaíso, Chile) is a Chilean author, columnist, and the former Minister of Foreign Affairs of Chile, a position he held from March 11, 2018 to June 13, 2019.

His first novel ¿Quién mató a Kristián Kustermann? was published in 1993 and in it he introduced his private eye, Cayetano Brulé, winning the Revista del Libro prize of El Mercurio. Since then the detective has appeared in five novels. In addition he has published an autobiographical novel about his years in Cuba titled Nuestros Años Verde Olivo (1999) and the novels Los Amantes de Estocolmo (Book of the Year in Chile, 2003 and the bestseller of the year in Chile)) and Pasiones Griegas (chosen as the Best Spanish Novel in China, 2006). His novels have been published in Latin America and Spain, and have been translated into German, French, Italian, Chinese, Swedish, Portuguese, Greek, Croatian, and English. In Chile his works have sold more than 40 editions.

Ampuero now resides in Iowa where he is a professor at the University of Iowa in the Department of Spanish and Portuguese. He was a columnist of La Tercera and the New York Times Syndicate and since March 2009 has been working as a columnist for El Mercurio. Between 2013 and 2014 he was Minister of Culture in the government of Sebastián Piñera.

== Early life (1953–1973) ==
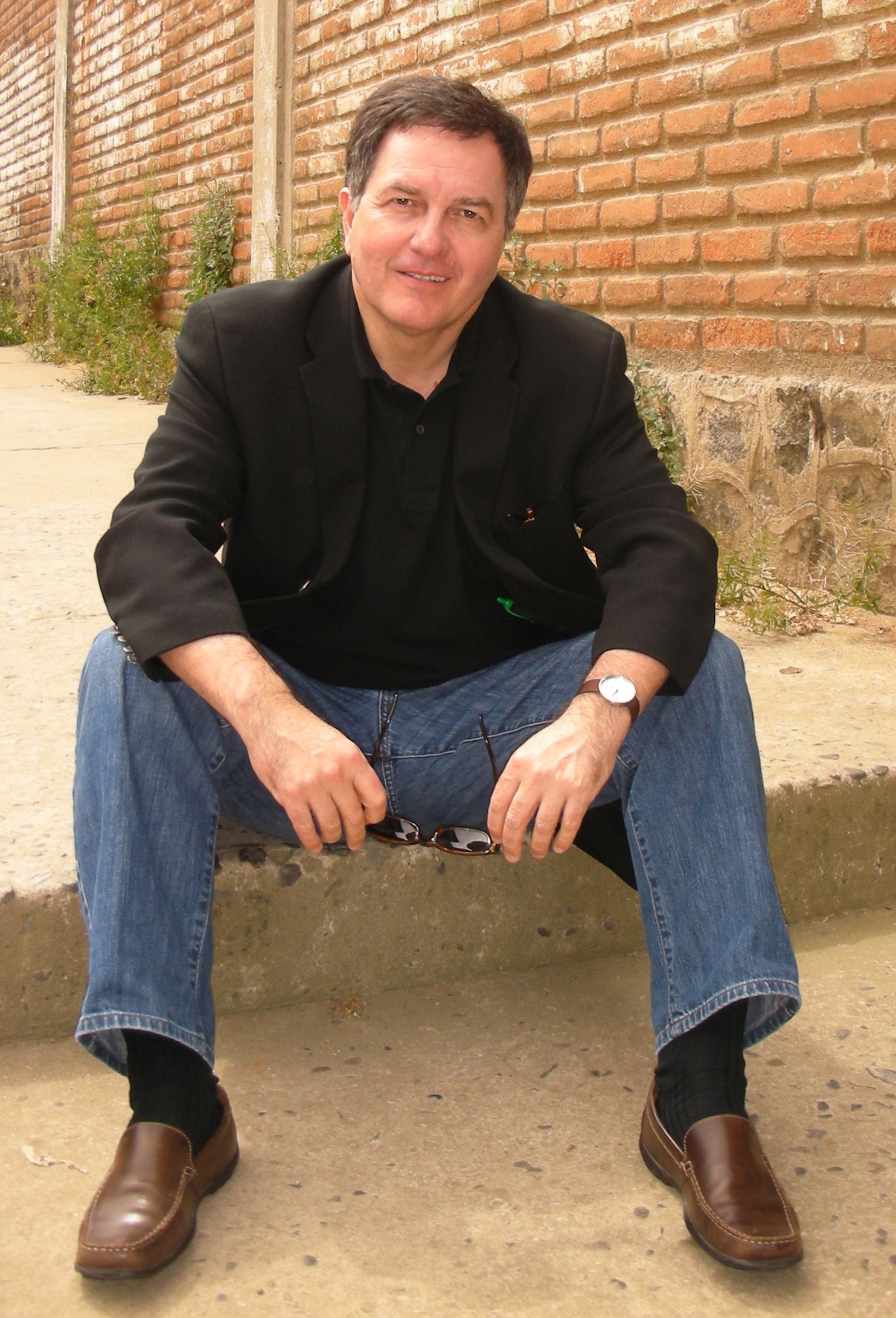
Roberto Ampuero en Valparaíso (3 de noviembre de 2008)

Roberto Ampuero Espinoza was born in Valparaiso in 1953, as the son of Roberto Ampuero Brule and Angelica Espinoza. He grew up in a "porteña middle class family who leaned to the political right," his maternal grandmother was French and his dad, worked during World War II for the exterior service of information for the United States. In his first years, he carried out his studies in the David Trumbull Presbyterian School, and later in the German school Deutsche Schule of Valparaiso (DSV) because his parents considered it to be an "excellent private school that was near the house" and they liked it for its "demanding curriculum, discipline, education, and language programs." While he was there, he learned to read and write in German. He studied there for 12 years, completing his schooling in 1971 with a GPA of 5.8 (from 1-7). Years later, he says "If it wasn't for this school, I wouldn't have lived in Germany and met my wife. DSV taught me to be disciplined and serious with what I do, to not waste time, to take difficult situations in stride, to be frugal and simple, and to experience and live in other cultures." In addition, he thanks DSV for helping him to become closer to writers such as Goethe, Schiller, Brecht, and Mann, and remembers that the school "marked my decision to travel the world with my nomadic soul."

After living 17 years in Valparaiso, Ampuero moved in 1972 to the capital of the country, Santiago, to matriculate into the University of Chile. There he studied Social Anthropology in the mornings and Latin American Literature in the afternoons. Around this time, he became a member of the Chilean Communist Youth. He says that "When I was young, I was a part of the Communist Youth because I believed that the socialism was democratic, just, and economically prosperous." After the coup d'état at the end of September in 1973, he decided to depart for East Germany.

== Exile to Cuba (1973–1979) ==
Thanks to a contact in the Eastern German Embassy, he left Chile in 1973 after receiving a scholarship for journalism in the University of Karl Marx in Leipzig.

In Eastern Germany he met Margarita Flores, daughter of Fernando Flores Ibarra, attorney general of the Cuban Revolution, with whom he left to live together in Cuba. They arrived at the island in 1974 and that same year they got married. However, this marriage only lasted until 1977.

In this period his political thought began to change. In an interview with Michael Moody in 1999 he says "It's not just that there was a lack of dialogue, but that the government despised the opposition, making them the enemy. I came from a country where it was a tradition to have dialogue, to have liberty. We had tried to restore the socialism, but now there was a dictatorship and what the people most criticized was that the dictator declared everyone against him an enemy of the state, and therefore you have to incarcerate them, shoot them, or expel them out of the country. When I arrived in Cuba I discovered that the government did the same to the opposition and that they didn"t have dialogue either." In 2008 he remembered that: "When I arrived in Cuba in 1974 and I saw the economic disaster I thought that it was as much a democracy as I am a Martian, I said to myself 'this is not the country I want! I quit the JJCC (communist youth) in 1976 in La Habana where everything was going on'"

In 1977 Ampuero obtained the Premio Lautaro de Cuentos (Short Stories Prize) from the Comité de la Resistencia Chilena, La Habana, and in 1978 he received the Mención Concurso de Cuentos 13 de Marzo. Then in 1979 he obtained a B.A. in Latin American Literature and left Cuba.

== East Germany (1979–1983) ==
After five years in La Habana, in 1979 he returned to East Germany. There he attended the "Escuela Juvenil Superior Wilhelm Pieck" (JHSWP), nicknamed the "Red Monastery," next to Berlin and the Bogensee lake. There with other Chileans, he got a Marxist education for a year, studying Marxist and Leninist doctrine. He was a member of the "Unión de Jóvenes Demócratas" (UJD), of liberal inspiration. Ampuero remembered that "the JHSWP wasn't a Punto Cero of military training like the ones that are in Cuba, Bulgaria, Libya, but a school of ideological thinking, but many others started believing in the idea that the only way was to resort to arms."

He enrolled in the Humboldt University where he took postgraduate courses in literature, economics, and politics until 1983. During these years he worked as a translator.

== West Germany (1983–1993) ==
In 1983 he crossed over to West Germany. From that year until 1993 he worked as a correspondent for the Italian agency IPS and as director of the German magazine Desarrollo y Cooperación, in Bonn. The following year he published his first novel, called El Hombre Golondrina in German, and in 1985 he published his second novel, La Guerra de los Duraznos, also in German. One of the two novels is illustrated by Santos Chávez. Both novels were published later in Spanish in 1997 and 2001 respectively, corrected and further developed.

In 1987 he married Ana Lucrecia Rivera Schwarz, who was an ambassador of Guatemala in Germany.

== Return to Chile (1993–1997) ==
In 1993 Ampuero departed from Western Germany and returned to his native country. That year he published his first novel in Spanish titled Who Killed Cristian Kustermann? with the premiere of the private detective Cayetano Brulé and obtained the Book Magazine Award of El Mercurio.

Before obtaining the Book Magazine Award he thought of opening a crêperie but he stopped when he learned of his award saying that "I have always liked writing, but I didn't want to dedicate myself only to writing. However, my wish to be the best crêpe master in Chile never materialized because of Cayetano Brulé."

Between 1994 and 1997 he worked in real estate. The following year he published Boleros en La Habana and won the Segundo Premio, Concurso de Cuentos de "Artes y Letras," El Mercurio and the Círculo de Críticos de Arte de Valparaíso. Two years later, in 1996 he published his third novel about the Cuban detective El Alemán de Atacama. That year he received the Reconocimiento Ilustre Municipalidad de Viña del Mar for his contributions to literature.

== Sweden (1997–2000) ==
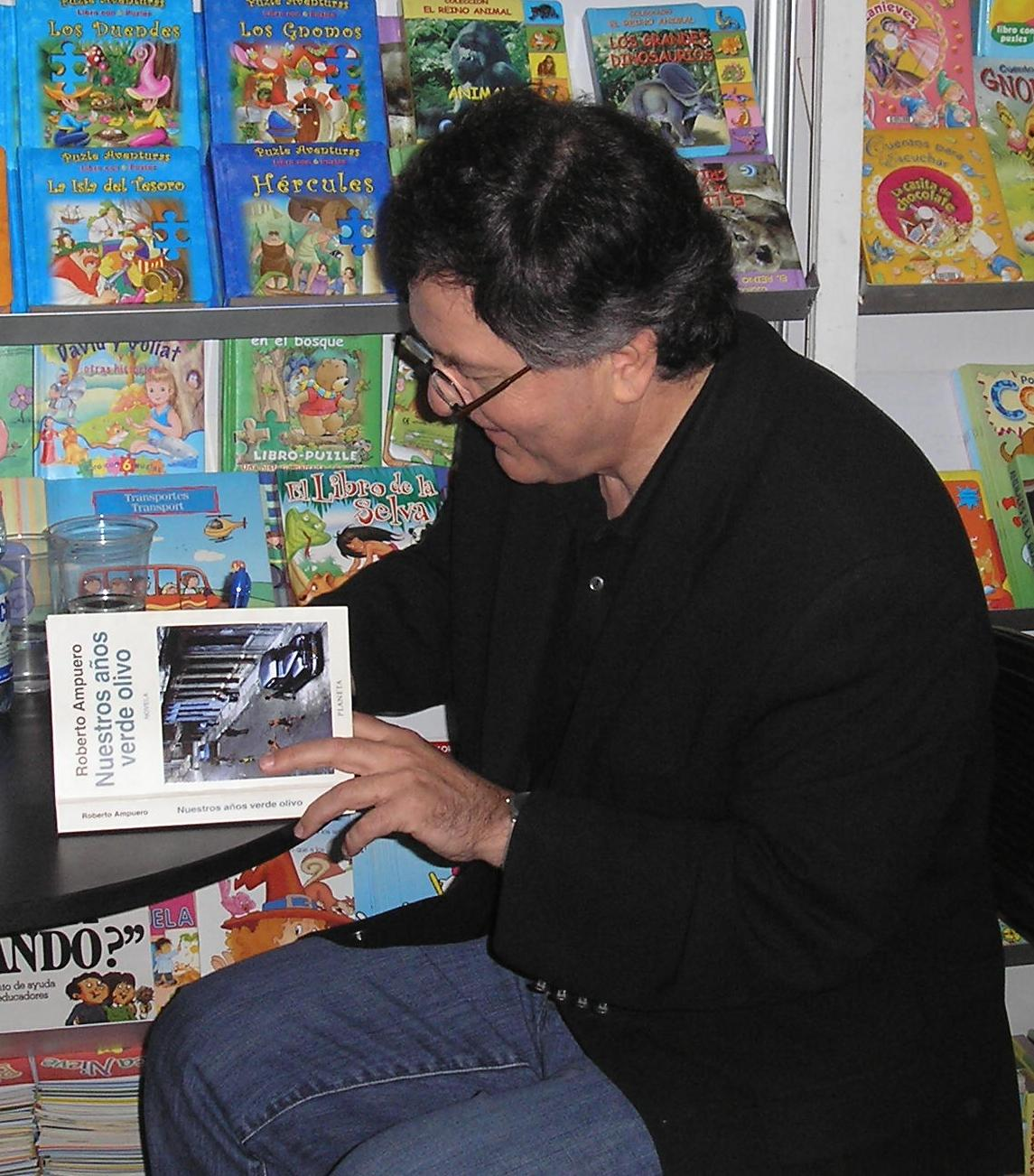
Roberto Ampuero signing Nuestros años verde olivo in Feria Chilena del Libro of Viña del Mar (01/09/09)

In 1997 he moved in with a Swedish family, residing in Stockholm. This same year he published El Hombre Golondrina, in Spanish and then in 1999 finished the book he had started writing in Cuba titled Nuestros Años Verdes Olivo. He says "the book was conceived to leave a testimony for my sons and grandsons, without thinking of publishing it, but I took the power of the "reality/fiction" that all novels have." In an interview in 2009 Ampuero says "the book continues to have new editions circulating the black market in Cuba, and in 2009 they are going to start shooting the movie. In a few weeks I'm going to present the book in Italy to a leftist editorial house that years before would not have published it." The book was published by the editorial house Fusi Orari under the name I nostri anni verde oliva. Una storia cubana. The movie will be released at Roos Film and it will be directed by Ignacio Eyzaguirre with the script written by Luís Ponce.

Ampuero was also creator of the histories, characters, and scenes of Brigade Escorpión (Chilean National Television (TVN) 1997) the first political television series that was produced in Chile and one of the first in Latin America.

== Iowa ==
In 2000 he moved to Iowa City with his wife and taught at the University of Iowa in the Spanish and Portuguese Department.

== Mexico City ==
In 2011 he was appointed as the Chilean ambassador to Mexico under Sebastián Piñera.

== Works ==
- 1993 ¿Quién mató a Cristián Kustermann? (novela policial), Editorial Planeta. "Who Killed Cristián Kusterman?"
- 1994 Boleros en La Habana (novela policial), Editorial Planeta. "Boleros in Havana"
- 1996 El alemán de Atacama (novela policial), Editorial Planeta. "The German of Atacama"
- 1997 El hombre golondrina (cuentos), Editorial Planeta. "The Swallow Man: and other stories"
- 1999 Nuestros años verde olivo, Editorial Planeta. "Our Olive Green Years"
- 2001 La guerra de los duraznos (novela juvenil), Editorial Andrés Bello. "The War of the Peaches"
- 2003 Los amantes de Estocolmo, Editorial Planeta. "The Stockholm Lovers"
- 2004 Cita en el Azul Profundo (novela policial), Editorial Planeta. "Appointment at the Azul Profundo"
- 2005 Halcones de la noche, Editorial Planeta. "Nighthawks"
- 2006 La Historia como conjetura. La narrativa de Jorge Edwards (ensayo), Editorial Andrés Bello. "The Story as Conjecture. The narrative of Jorge Edwards"
- 2006 Pasiones griegas, Editorial Planeta, 260 págs, ISBN 956-247-408-9. "Greek Passions"
- 2008 El caso Neruda, Norma-La Otra Orilla, 330 pages, "The Neruda case".
- 2010 La otra mujer, La otra Orilla, 370 pages, "The other woman"
- 2013 Bahía de los misterios, Plaza Janés, 344 pages, Bay of mysteries.
- 2014 El Ultimo Tango de Salvador Allende, Vintage Espanol. "The Last Tango of Salvador Allende".

English translation

- 2012 The Neruda Case, trans. Carolina De Robertis

== Awards and honors ==
- 1977 Premio Lautaro de Cuentos. Comité de la Resistencia Chilena, La Habana
- 1978 Mención Concurso de Cuentos 13 de Marzo, Universidad de La Habana .
- 1993 ¿Quién mato a Cristian Kustermann?, selected by El Mercurio Book Review in 1993.
- 1994 Segundo Premio, Concurso de Cuentos de "Artes y Letras", El Mercurio.
- 1994 Círculo de Críticos de Arte de Valparaíso.
- 1996 Reconocimiento Ilustre Municipalidad de Viña del Mar, por sus aportes literarios.
- 2003 Los Amantes de Estocolmo, selected as “Book of the Year 2003” by Review of Books, Santiago, Chile.
- 2006 Designated an “Illustrious son” by the city of Valparaíso.
- 2006 Pasiones Griegas, selected Best Spanish-language novels published in 2006 by The People's Publishing House of China, Beijing.
- 2008 Premio Personalidades 2008, reconocimiento otorgado por la Corporación Cultural de la Quinta Región, el que forma parte de los Premios Regionales al Mérito Cultural
