= Ricardo Lagos =

President of Chile from 2000 to 2006

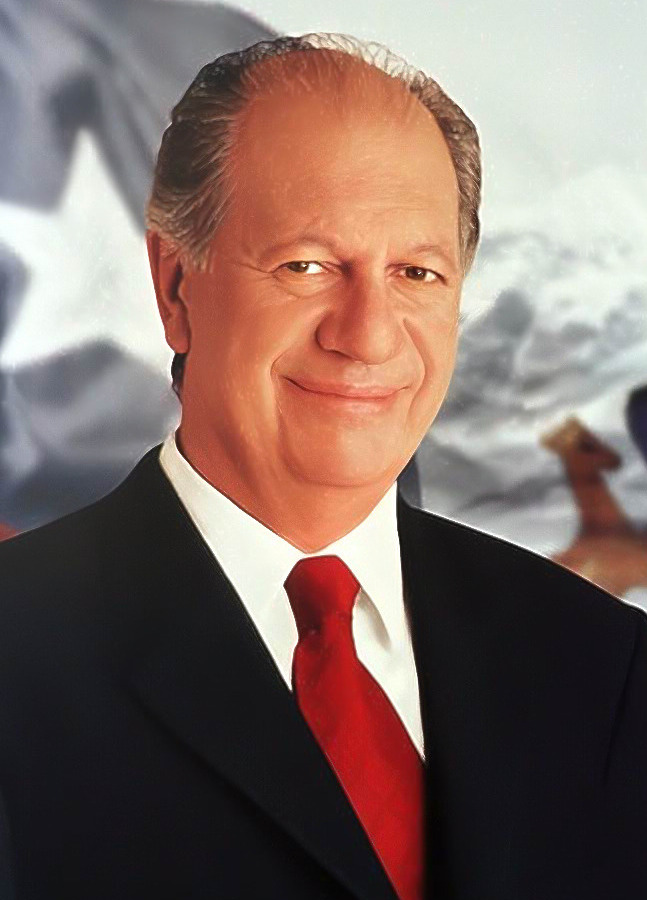
- Official portrait, 2000

33rd President of Chile
- In office 11 March 2000 – 11 March 2006
- Preceded by: Eduardo Frei Ruiz-Tagle
- Succeeded by: Michelle Bachelet

Minister of Public Works
- In office 11 March 1994 – 1 August 1998
- President: Eduardo Frei Ruiz-Tagle
- Preceded by: Carlos Hurtado Ruiz-Tagle
- Succeeded by: Jaime Tohá

Minister of Education
- In office 11 March 1990 – 28 September 1992
- President: Patricio Aylwin
- Preceded by: René Salamé
- Succeeded by: Jorge Arrate

Personal details
- Born: 2 March 1938 (age 88) Santiago, Chile
- Party: Party for Democracy (1987–present)
- Other political affiliations: Radical Party (1959–1961); Socialist Party of Chile (1961–1987)
- Spouses: Carmen Weber (m. 1961; ann. 1969) Luisa Durán (m. 1971)
- Children: Ricardo; Ximena; Hernán (stepson); Francisca; Alejandro (stepson)
- Education: University of Chile; Duke University
- Occupation: Lawyer; Economist
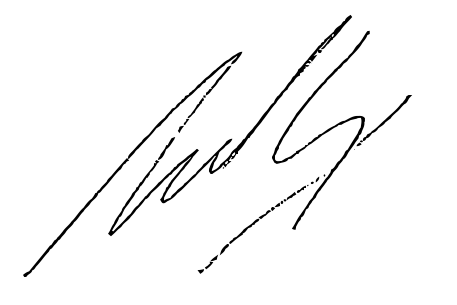
- Signature

Ricardo Froilán Lagos Escobar (Spanish pronunciation: [riˈkaɾðo fɾojˈlan ˈlaɣos eskoˈβaɾ]; born 2 March 1938) is a Chilean lawyer, economist and social-democratic politician who served as president of Chile from 2000 to 2006. During the 1980s he was a well-known opponent of the Chilean military dictatorship and astounded contemporaries in 1988 by openly denouncing dictator Augusto Pinochet on live television. He served as Minister of Education from 1990 to 1992 and Minister of Public Works from 1994 to 1998 under President Eduardo Frei Ruiz-Tagle before narrowly winning the 1999–2000 presidential election in a runoff against Independent Democrat Union (UDI) candidate Joaquín Lavín. Lagos was the third president from the centre-left Coalition of Parties for Democracy to have governed Chile since 1990. He was succeeded on 11 March 2006 by Socialist Michelle Bachelet, from the same coalition. From 2007 to 2010 he served as a Special Envoy on Climate Change for the United Nations Secretary-General Ban Ki-moon. Lagos made an unsuccessful bid to run for president in the 2017 Chilean general election.

== Early years ==
Lagos was born in Santiago, Chile. He was the only child of Froilán Lagos Sepúlveda (a farmer who died when his son was eight years old) and Emma Escobar Morales (who died in 2005). He attended primary school at Liceo Experimental Manuel de Salas and high school at the prestigious Instituto Nacional.

In 1961, Lagos married Carmen Weber, with whom he had two children. In 1969, he met Luisa Durán and they married in 1971. The couple shared the parenting of the children of Lagos's first marriage, the children of Durán's first marriage and their only child together.

While in university, Lagos attended the lectures of historian Jaime Eyzaguirre whom he held in high esteem.

== Academic and diplomatic career ==
After obtaining his law degree from the University of Chile in 1960, Lagos pursued a Ph.D. in Economics from Duke University, which he completed in 1966. During that time he became a visiting professor at the University of North Carolina at Chapel Hill political science department until 1965. After his time in North Carolina, he maintained ties with both universities. On his return to Chile, he was employed at the Institute of Economy of the University of Chile directed by Carlos Massad. In 1967, he was named Director of the School of Political and Administrative Sciences, a position he held until 1973 when he became Secretary General of the University of Chile. Lagos subsequently began work as a professor of economics in the School of Law at the University of Chile, and between 1971 and 1972 he was Director of the Institute of Economy. He was later named Director of the Latin American Council of Social Sciences.

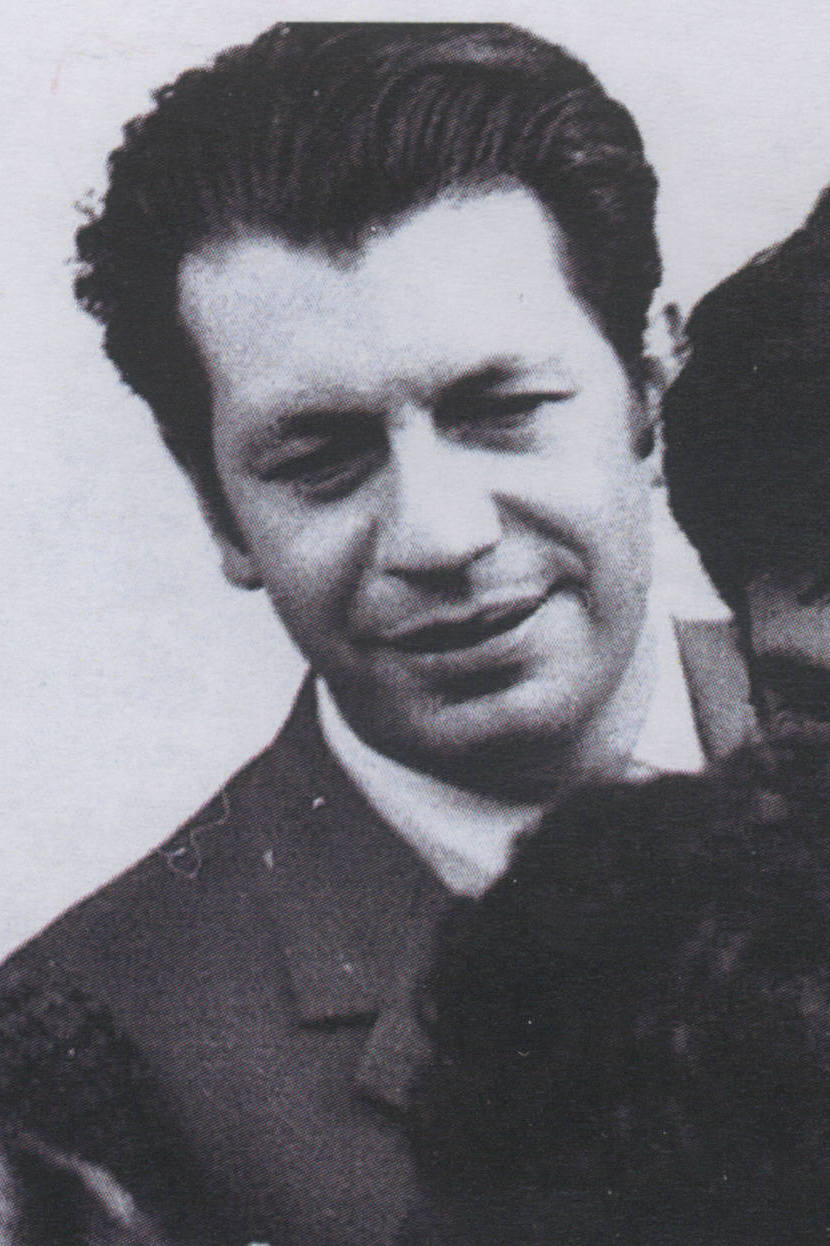
Lagos in 1969

During the 1970s, Lagos declared himself an "independent of the left" and abandoned the Radical Party of Chile, which he had joined in 1961 when this party supported Jorge Alessandri's government. Although he did not possess much diplomatic experience, he worked with Hernán Santa Cruz as the Chilean delegates to the United Nations and presented an outstanding speech on the international financial crisis. During the speech, he strongly criticized the decision of U.S. President Richard Nixon to suspend the convertibility of the U.S. dollar into gold, a measure that would end in the rounding up the Asian crisis. In 1972, President Salvador Allende appointed Lagos as the Chilean ambassador to the Soviet Union in Moscow, but the appointment was never ratified by Congress. As a Regional Director of the training program of post graduate studies in social sciences, he was later put in charge of Project UNESCO, of the United Nations Development Programme (UNDP) in Buenos Aires. As a public servant, he also served Chile as a United Nations delegate with the rank of ambassador at the 26th United Nations General Assembly. In addition, he was a delegate to the UN's 3rd Conference of Commerce and Development (United Nations Conference on Trade and Development).

Soon after the 1973 coup d'état, he and his family were sent into exile in Buenos Aires, Argentina, where he took the position of Secretary General of the Latin American Faculty of Social Sciences (FLACSO). He moved for a year to the United States, where he became visiting professor of the William R. Kenan chair for Latin American Studies at the University of North Carolina at Chapel Hill. In 1975, he worked as a consultant for the United Nations Development Programme.

Lagos returned to Chile in 1978, and worked for the Regional Program of Employment of the United Nations, PREALC. During the implementation of policies imposed by the International Monetary Fund, his mission was to advise all the governments in the South American continent on the matter of employment.

== Political career ==
During the 1980s, Lagos assumed a fundamental role in the fight for the recovery of democracy. In addition to being one of the leaders of the Socialist Party of Chile, he became President of the Democratic Alliance, a force that grouped the majority of the democratic parties opposing the dictatorship of General Augusto Pinochet. In 1983, he decided to leave his position as an international civil employee in the United Nations. In December of that year, he became president of the Democratic Alliance. In 1987, as the president of the Committee of the Left for Free Elections, he called on all citizens and parties to enrol in the electoral registries to cast their vote for the "No" option in the constitutionally-mandated October 1988 referendum, in which Pinochet sought to obtain a new eight-year term in office.

Lagos became the undisputed leader of Pinochet's opponents after appearing in Canal 13's first political debate show since the 1973 coup d'état, De cara al país (towards the country), where he stated; "With the triumph of "No", the country will prevent General Pinochet from being 25 years in power, it will mark the start of the end of the dictatorship". Lagos then looked directly into the camera and accusingly raised his index finger to say directly to all viewers:

General Pinochet has not been honest with the country... I will remind you, General Pinochet, that on the day of the 1980 plebiscite you said that "President Pinochet would not be a candidate in 1989". ... And now, you promise the country another eight years, with tortures, murders, and human rights violations. It seems to me inadmissible, that a Chilean can have so much hunger for power, to aim to stay for 25 years in power! Never before has a Chilean ever done so. And you asked me to answer either Yes or No, and that's what I did. Please excuse me, Raquel, but I'm speaking after being silent for 15 years already!

— Ricardo Lagos

To this day, in Chile the phrase "Lagos's finger" refers to this memorable event; on that night, many people were convinced he would not survive to see the next day. Indirectly, as Lagos reminded on live TV, Pinochet did not run for the presidency in 1989 as he previously promised.

After the triumph of the No alternative and the subsequent resignation of Pinochet, Lagos declined to be a candidate for the presidency in spite of being the main leader of the opposition. Instead, he supported Patricio Aylwin's candidacy and ran for a seat in the Senate for the Santiago-West district. On 11 December 1989, the day of the elections, he obtained the district's second majority. Nevertheless, he did not win a seat because his alliance's list did not double the vote of the second most voted list; this being a requisite in the Chilean electoral system created by Pinochet.

In 1990, Lagos was named Minister of Education by President Patricio Aylwin. In this position, he initiated reform aimed at increasing equality in access and improving education levels. In June 1993, he pushed for the notion of using primary elections in order to select the Concertación coalition's candidate for the following presidential election. He lost this primary to Eduardo Frei Ruiz-Tagle, who went on to become President of Chile. In 1994, Frei himself named Lagos Minister of Public Works. In this role, he developed an innovative system of road concessions, integrated the private sector in the construction of works and its later operation. During the Frei administration, he continued to be a leader of opinion and was a sure option for the following presidential election. His status was later ratified by his appointment as one of the members of the Committee of Twelve Distinguished Members of the Socialist International, which he shared with such personalities as Felipe González and Gro Harlem Brundtland. This committee was set up to process proposals for the renovation of the social democratic thought for the 21st century.

In 1999, Lagos resigned as minister in order to begin his presidential campaign. In the primaries, he defeated senator Andrés Zaldívar, of the Christian Democratic Party to become the Concertación's sole presidential candidate. In the first round of the presidential election in December of the same year, he defeated right-wing candidate Joaquín Lavín, by only 30,000 votes. Since he failed to obtain an absolute majority, as is required to be elected president, a presidential runoff was subsequently held in January 2000 for the first time ever in Chile. Winning 51.3 percent of the vote, Lagos became the new President of Chile.

== Presidency (2000–2006) ==
The Lagos Cabinet
Office	Name	Party	Term
President	Ricardo Lagos	PPD	11 March 2000–11 March 2006
Interior	José Miguel Insulza	PS	11 March 2000–2005
Francisco Vidal	PPD	2005–11 March 2006
Foreign Affairs	Soledad Alvear	DC	11 March 2000–1 October 2004
Ignacio Walker	DC	1 October 2004–11 March 2006
Defense	Mario Fernández	DC	11 March 2000–7 February 2002
Michelle Bachelet	PS	7 February 2002–1 October 2004
Jaime Ravinet	DC	1 October 2004–11 March 2006
Finance	Nicolás Eyzaguirre	PPD	11 March 2000–11 March 2006
Gen. Sec. of the Presidency	Álvaro García Hurtado	PPD	11 March 2000–2002
Mario Fernández	DC	2002–2003
Francisco Huenchumilla	DC	2003–2004
Eduardo Dockendorff	DC	2004–11 March 2006
Gen. Sec. of Government	Claudio Huepe	DC	11 March 2000–2002
Heraldo Muñoz	PPD	2002–2003
Francisco Vidal	PPD	2002–2005
Osvaldo Puccio	PS	2005–11 March 2006
Economy, Development & Tourism	José de Gregorio	DC	11 March 2000–2001
Jorge Rodríguez Grossi	DC	2001–11 March 2006
Social Development & Family	Alejandra Krauss	DC	11 March 2000–2002
Cecilia Pérez Díaz	PS	7 February 2002–2003
Andrés Palma Irarrázaval	DC	2003–2004
Yasna Provoste	DC	2004–11 March 2006
Education	Mariana Aylwin	DC	11 March 2000–2003
Sergio Bitar	PPD	2003–2005
Marigen Hornkohl	DC	2005–11 March 2006
Justice & Human; Rights	José Antonio Gómez Urrutia	PRSD	11 March 2000–3 March 2003
Luis Bates	DC	3 March 2003–11 March 2006
Labor & Social Welfare	Ricardo Solari	PS	11 March 2000–2005
Yerko Ljubetic	PS	2005–11 March 2006
Public Works	Carlos Cruz Lorenzen	PS	11 March 2000–2002
Javier Etcheberry	PPD	2002–2004
Jaime Estévez	PPD	2004–11 March 2006
Health	Michelle Bachelet	PS	11 March 2000–2002
Osvaldo Artaza	Ind.	2002–2003
Pedro García Aspillaga	Ind.	2003–11 March 2006
Housing & Urbanism	Claudio Orrego	DC	11 March 2000–2001
Jaime Ravinet	DC	2001–2004
Sonia Tschorne	PS	2004–11 March 2006
Agriculture	Jaime Campos	PRSD	11 March 2000–11 March 2006
Mining	Jorge Rodríguez Grossi	DC	11 March 2000–2002
Alfonso Dulanto Rencoret	DC	2002–11 March 2006
Women & Gender; Equality	Adriana Delpiano	PPD	11 March 2000–3 March 2003
Cecilia Pérez Díaz	PS	3 March 2003–11 March 2006
Culture & the Arts	José Weinstein	PPD	3 March 2003–11 March 2006

=== Internal issues ===
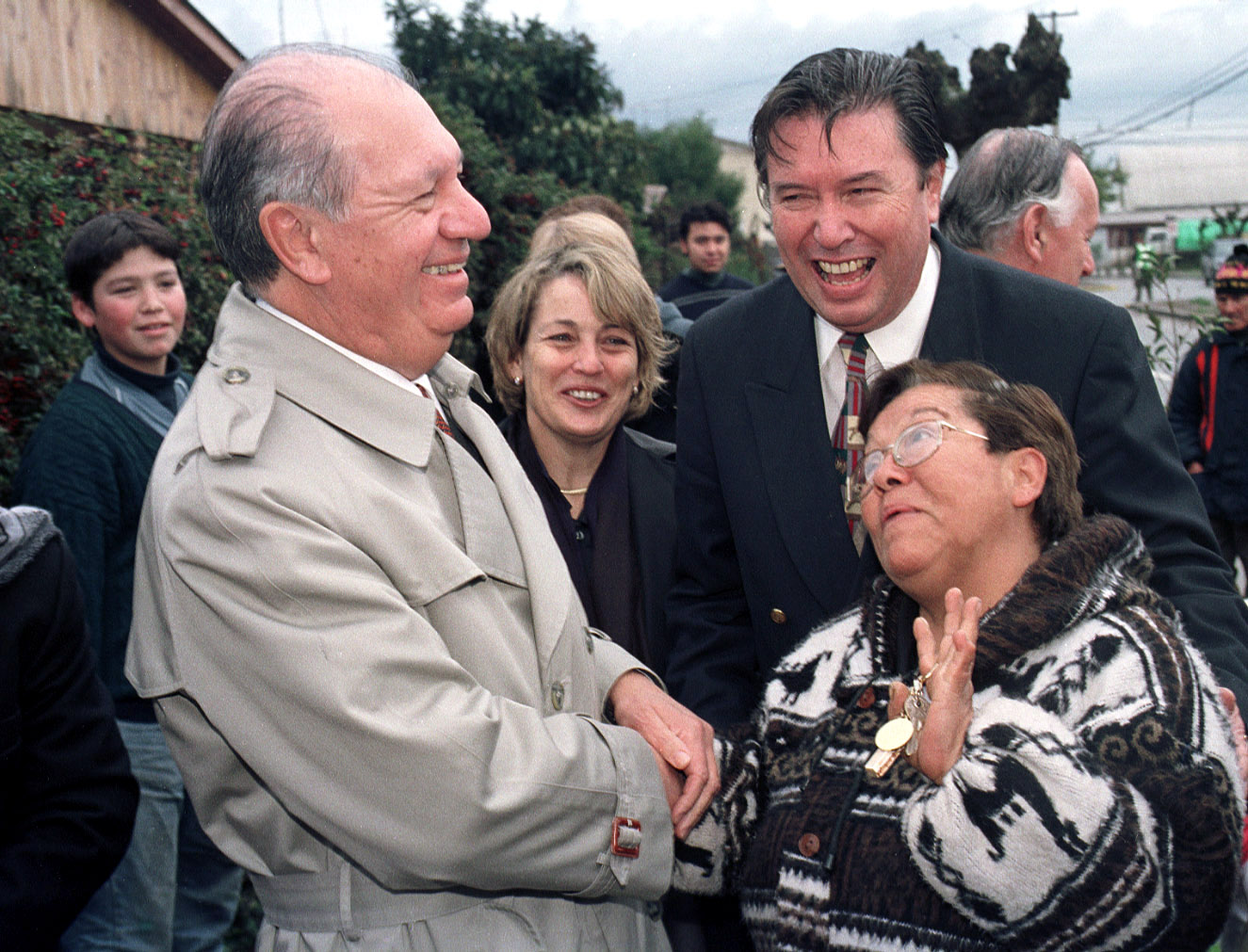
Lagos visits Paniahue in 2001.

During the first year of his term in office, Lagos had to confront a high level of unemployment, generated by the political instability of the region, a process that began to revert at the end of 2003. He also promised to keep the budget deficit in check and interest rates and inflation low. Lagos enjoyed great popular support, bordering on 55%, and ending around 60-70% during the last six months of his term. He left office with an approval rating of 75%, a historic level of support for any politician in post-Pinochet Chile. The policy of proximity with people was pronounced in the opening of the doors of the Palacio de La Moneda, that had remained closed since the 1973 coup d'état. Lagos's lowest approval rating in office was 45%, which was still a decent rating for any Chilean politician post-Pinochet.

On 3 April 2001, with a 63–37–4 vote, the Chamber of Deputies of Chile approved a bill to abolish the death penalty in Chile for civilian crimes and set the maximum punishment at life imprisonment. The politicians who rejected the bill belonged to right-wing Chilean parties. The law was set to go into effect as soon as then-President Lagos signed it, which he did weeks later. Justice Minister José Antonio Gómez Urrutia praised both the Chamber of Deputies and Lagos for supporting the measure.

Beginning in 2002, Lagos's government had to face suspicions of political corruption due to the prosecution of one of his ministers, Carlos Cruz, and of other civil employees of the Public Works Ministry, in the denominated MOP-GATE case. Gloria Ana Chevesich, the judge in charge of this case, discovered that ministers, undersecretaries, and other officials of exclusive confidence of the President received additional payments to their regular remuneration: the so-called "extra payments". This irregularity was acknowledged by Lagos, who specified that the practice had also developed during the governments of Frei Ruiz-Tagle and Aylwin. The official position of the government consisted of not acknowledging the criminal nature of these practices and establishing a legal reform that increased the pay of ministers and undersecretaries of the government, a matter that was approved in its legislative proceeding.

==== Human rights ====
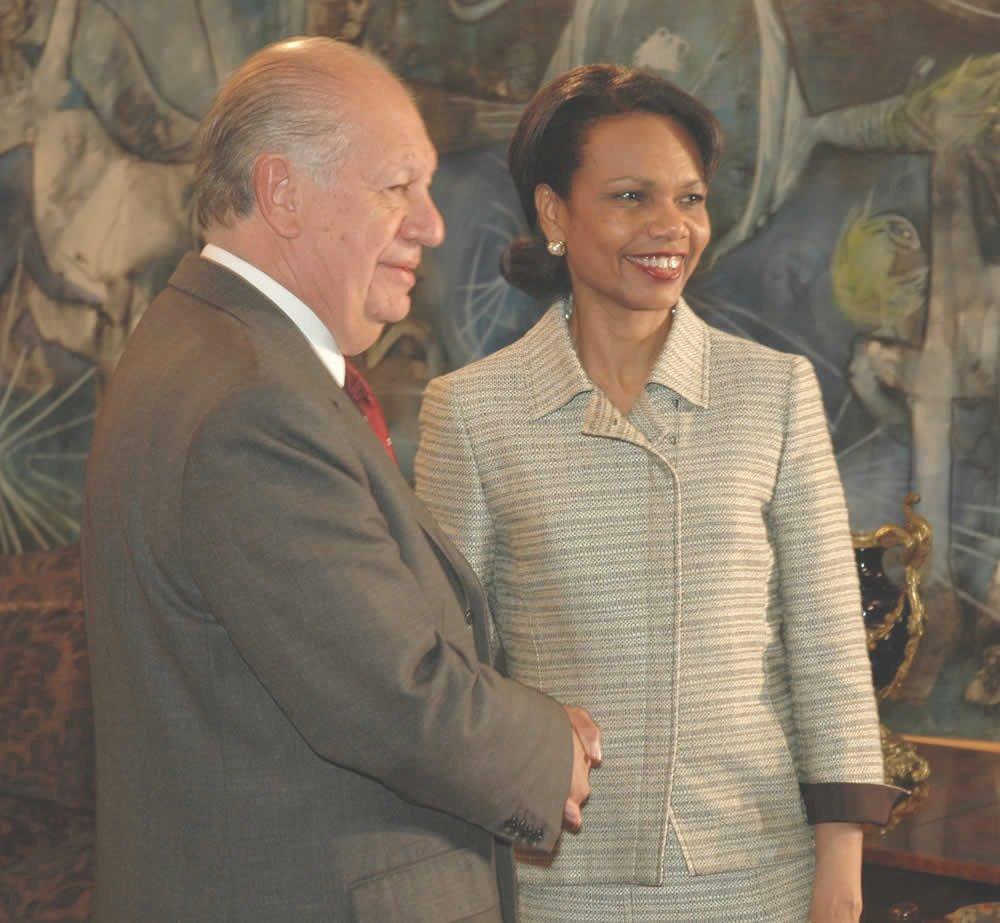
Ricardo Lagos with United States Secretary of State Condoleezza Rice in 2005.

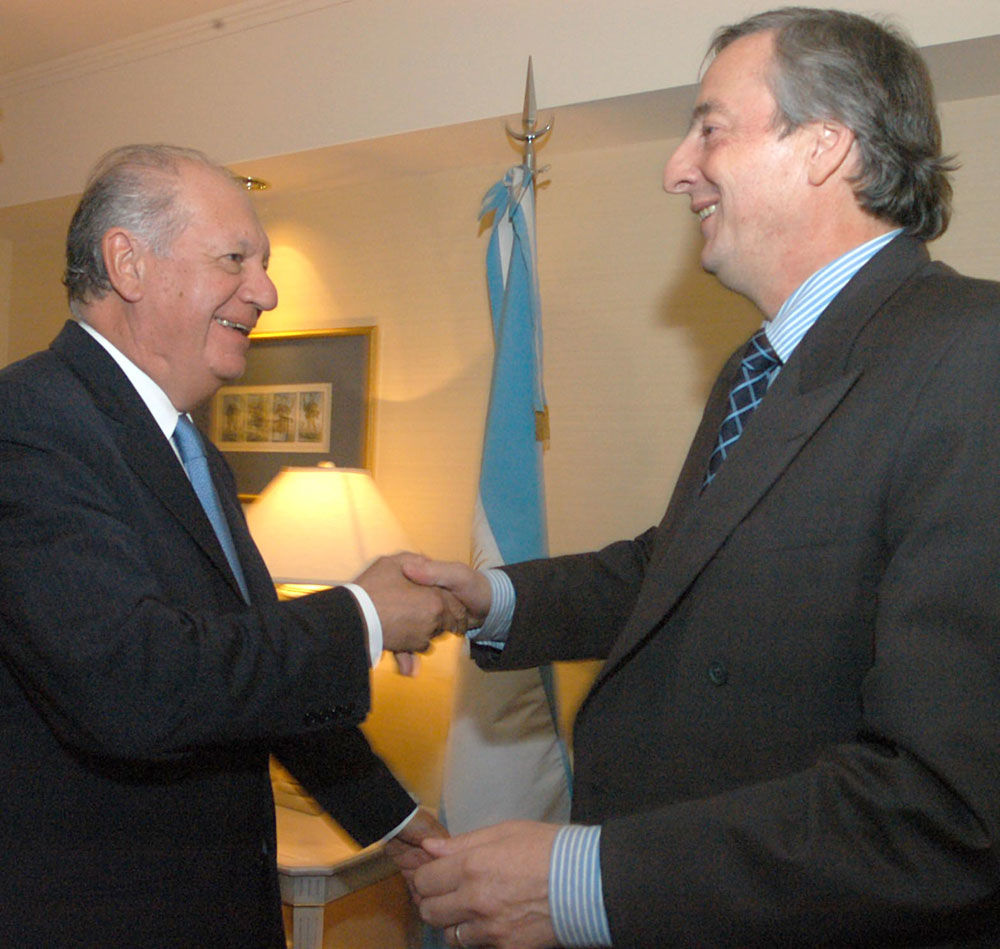
Ricardo Lagos with Néstor Kirchner.

All governments of the Concertación made progress in clarifying the crimes committed during the military dictatorship. During the government of Patricio Aylwin, the Rettig Report was issued, documenting political executions and forced disappearances. Under Eduardo Frei Ruiz-Tagle, dialogue roundtables were created in which the armed forces were required to provide the information they possessed regarding the whereabouts of the disappeared detainees. Ricardo Lagos established a commission to determine the extent of torture in Chile. On 28 November 2004, the day before the release of the Valech Report, President Lagos announced that the government would provide compensation to approximately 30,000 victims of human rights violations during the military dictatorship. Of the 35,868 individuals who testified before the National Commission on Political Imprisonment and Torture, about 30,000 cases were deemed legitimate. On 15 June 2005, Lagos submitted to the National Congress bill No. 20,405 creating the National Institute of Human Rights (Chile), which would be established in 2010.

=== Foreign relations ===
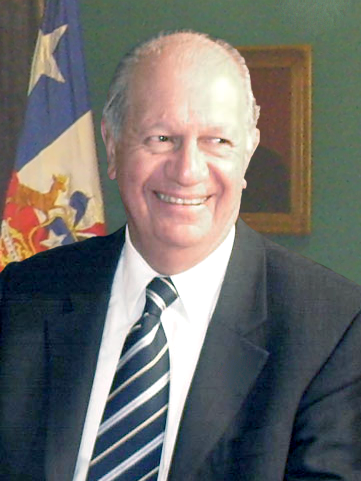
Lagos in 2006

During 2004, Lagos faced a series of tensions in his relationship with other South American countries, caused by recurring Bolivian aspirations for access to the sea. This situation was linked to the power crisis taking place in Argentina, an important supplier of natural gas to Chile. In bilateral meetings between Bolivian President Carlos Mesa and Argentine President Néstor Kirchner, the former agreed to the sale of Bolivian gas to Argentina under the condition that "not a single gas molecule be sold to Chile". Additionally, the Venezuelan President, Hugo Chávez, has supported in various instances the Bolivian sea claim, causing a diplomatic impassé between Chile and Venezuela. The tension between both governments had dissipated during July 2004.

=== Legacy ===
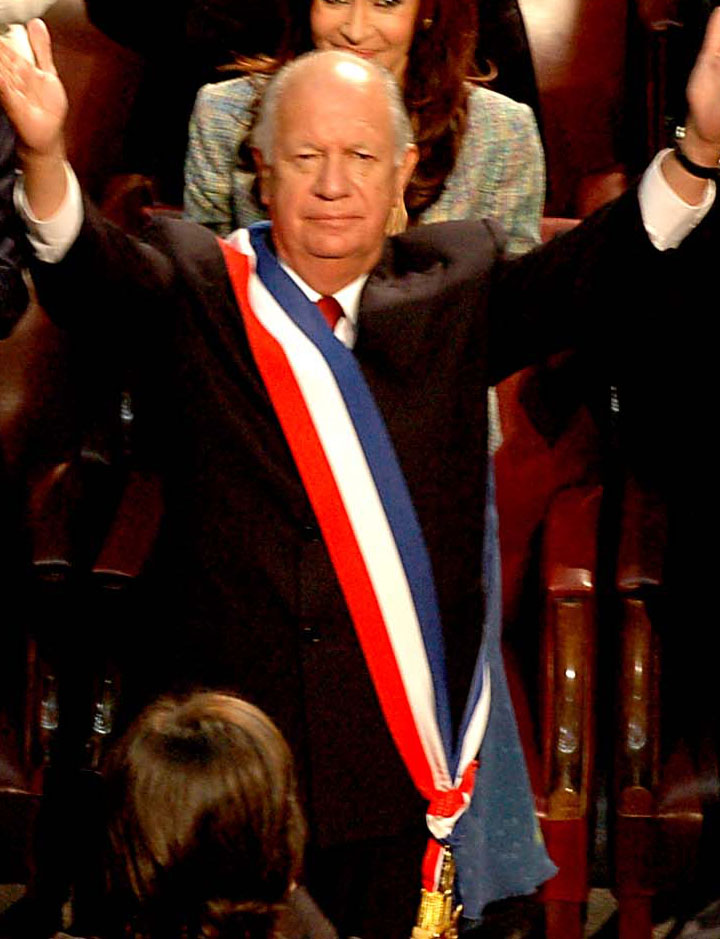
Lagos arrives at the inauguration of his successor, Michelle Bachelet.

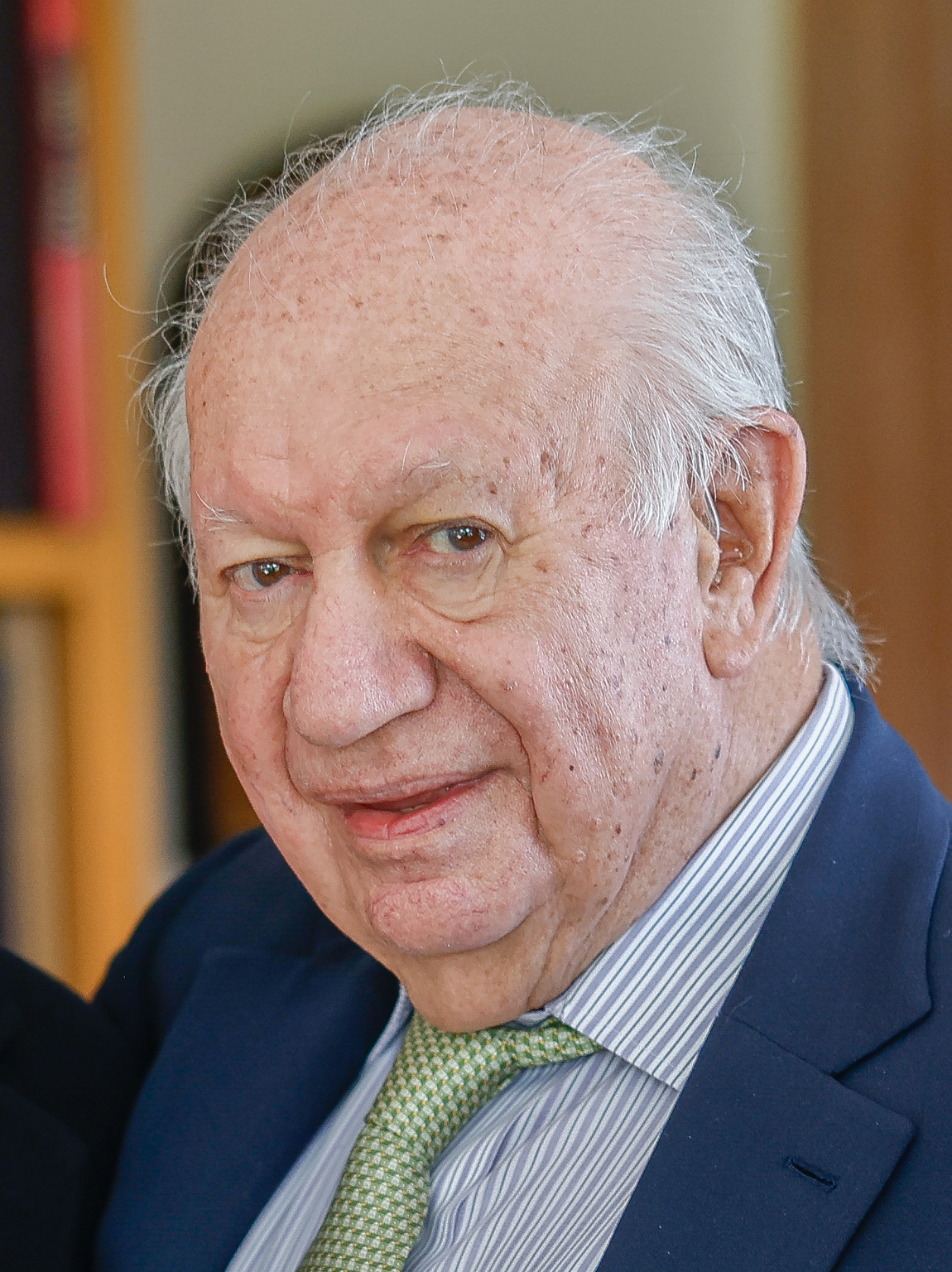
Ricardo Lagos in 2024

During Lagos's presidency, Free Trade Agreements were signed with the European Community, the United States, South Korea, the People's Republic of China and New Zealand, Singapore and Brunei (though some of his supporters in the center-left Coalition of Parties for Democracy consider that these agreements may have negative effects on the country); the incidence of extreme poverty was significantly reduced; the legal workweek was reduced from 48 to 45 hours; improvements were made in infrastructure and transport; an unemployment insurance scheme was created; as well as the AUGE health program guaranteeing coverage for a number of medical conditions; the Chile Barrio housing program; the Chile Solidario program; compulsory schooling was extended to 12 years; the first divorce law in Chile was approved; monetary compensation to victims of torture under the Pinochet regime identified in the Valech Report was authorized; and, recently, a recast constitution was signed. He finished his six-year term with a historically high approval rating of 70%.

== Post-presidential career ==
=== Political ===
On 24 March 2006, Lagos inaugurated his own foundation called Democracia y Desarrollo ("Democracy and Development") in Santiago. Three days later he began a two-year term as President of the Club de Madrid—an exclusive organization of former presidents created by a Spanish philanthropist to promote democracy across the world. He also assumed co-chairmanship of the Inter-American Dialogue's Board of Directors.

On 2 May 2007 Lagos, along with Gro Harlem Brundtland and Han Seung-soo, was named by UN Secretary-General Ban Ki-moon as a Special Envoy on Climate Change. His appointment was and still is very controversial among Chilean environmental groups who questioned his track record on the matter, claiming that he 'showed an utter lack of consideration for the environment, promoted policies against environmental sustainability and favoured the interests of big economic groups, even defending crimes against nature internationally', favouring large corporations every single time there was a clash between local communities, environmental concerns and perceived economic benefits.

On 14 January 2017, Lagos accepted the Party for Democracy's nomination to run for president in 2017. However, he withdrew soon after the Party for Democracy publicly backed Alejandro Guillier. Following this he announced his retirement.

=== Publishing ===
In early 2007, Lagos became a member of the editorial board of Americas Quarterly, a policy publication focused on relations and development in the Western Hemisphere. Lagos contributes regularly.

=== Academic ===
After abandoning power, Lagos taught a one-month special seminar at UC Berkeley's Center for Latin American Studies, called "Democracy and Development in Latin America".

In May 2007, Brown University announced that Lagos would take a teaching position at the Watson Institute for International Studies for a period of five years, starting on 1 July 2007.

In 2013, Lagos was a visiting professor at the University of São Paulo assuming the "José Bonifácio Cátedra".

== Styles, honours and arms ==
Presidential styles of Ricardo Lagos Escobar
- Reference style: His Excellency
- Spoken style: Your Excellency
- Alternative style: Mr. President

=== Awards ===
- On 24 May 2018, he was awarded the Doctor of Laws degree by Harvard University.

=== National honours ===
- Grand Master (2000–2006) and Collar of the Order of Merit
- Grand Master (2000–2006) and Collar of the Order of Bernardo O'Higgins

=== Foreign honours ===
- Italy: Knight Grand Cross decorated with Grand Cordon of the Order of Merit of the Italian Republic (3 March 2000)
- Portugal: Grand Collar of the Order of Prince Henry (2001)
- Slovakia: Grand Cross (or 1st Class) of the Order of the White Double Cross (2001)
- Croatia: Grand Cross of the Grand Order of King Tomislav (6 February 2004)
- Spain: Knight Collar of the Order of Isabella the Catholic (1 June 2001)
- Peru: Grand Cross with Diamonds of the Order of the Sun (29 July 2001)
- Hungary: Grand Cross with Chain of the Order of Merit of the Republic of Hungary (2002)
- Poland: Grand Cross of the Order of Merit of the Republic of Poland (2002)
- Finland: Grand Cross with Collar of the Order of the White Rose of Finland (2002)
- Romania: Grand Cross with Chain of the Order of the Star of Romania (2004)
- Bulgaria: Grand Cross of the Order of the Balkan Mountains (2004)
- Algeria: Order of the Athir (7 May 2005)
- Uruguay: Medal of the Oriental Republic of Uruguay (2002)

=== Arms ===
As Grand Master of the Chilean Order of Merit
(attributed)

As Knight of the Collar of the Order of Isabella the Catholic
(attributed)

== See also ==
- Politics of Chile
- Lissette García Bustamante

Political offices
Preceded by René Salamé Martín	Minister of Education; 1990–1992	Succeeded by Jorge Arrate
Preceded by Carlos Hurtado Ruiz-Tagle	Minister of Public Works; 1994–1998	Succeeded by Jaime Tohá
Preceded by Eduardo Frei Ruiz-Tagle	President of Chile; 2000–2006	Succeeded by Michelle Bachelet
Party political offices
Preceded by Eduardo Frei Ruiz-Tagle	Party for Democracy nominee for President of Chile; 1999–2000	Succeeded by Michelle Bachelet
Preceded by Eduardo Frei Ruiz-Tagle	Concertación nominee for President of Chile; 1999–2000	Succeeded by Michelle Bachelet
Diplomatic posts
Preceded by Thaksin Shinawatra	Chairperson of APEC; 2004	Succeeded by Roh Moo-hyun
