= Francisco Vidal Salinas =

Chilean politician

Francisco Vidal
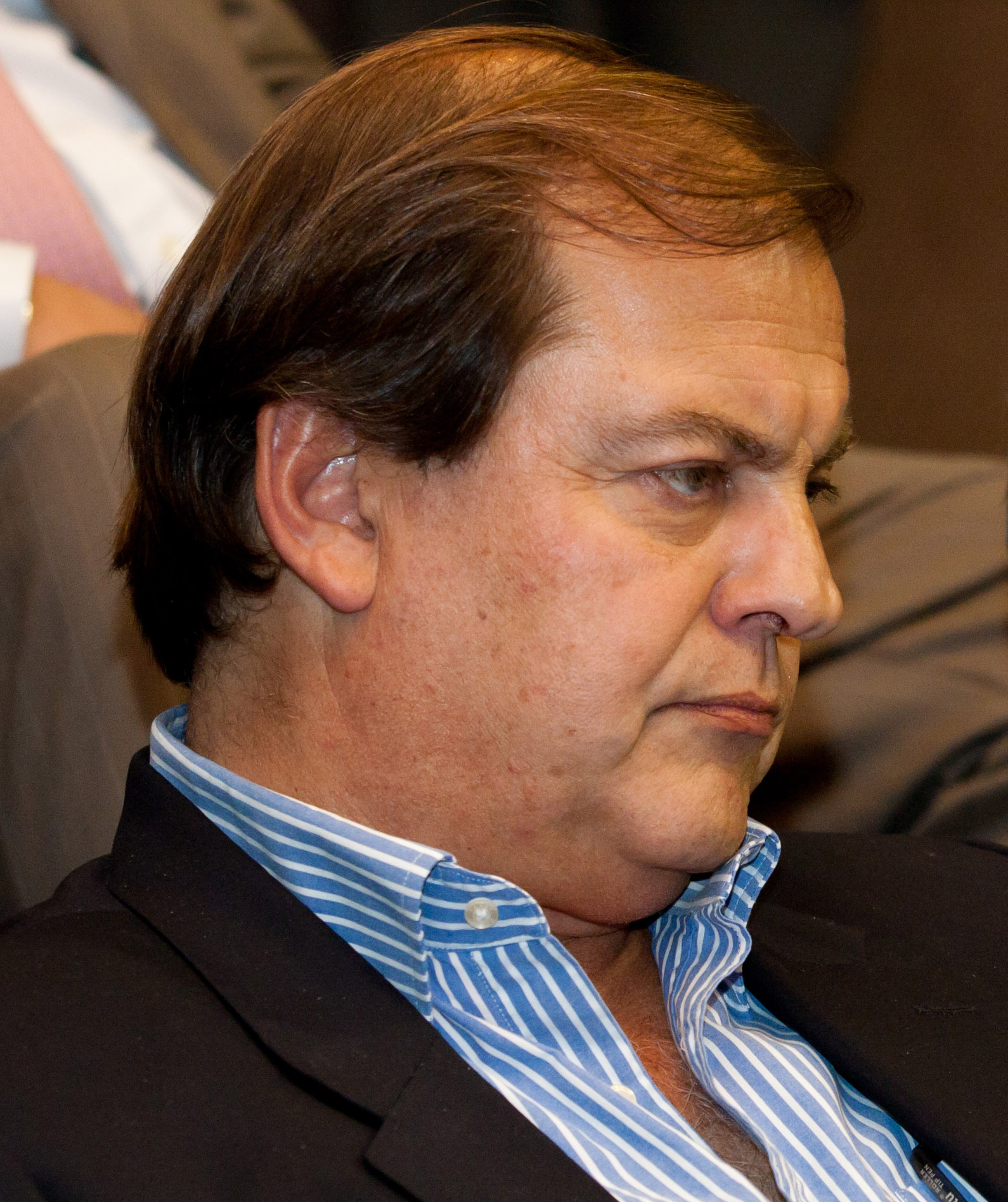

Minister of Defense
- In office 12 March 2009 – 11 March 2010
- President: Michelle Bachelet
- Preceded by: José Goñi
- Succeeded by: Jaime Ravinet

Minister General Secretariat of Government
- In office 6 December 2007 – 12 March 2009
- President: Michelle Bachelet
- Preceded by: Ricardo Lagos Weber
- Succeeded by: Carolina Tohá
- In office 3 March 2003 – 24 May 2005
- President: Ricardo Lagos
- Preceded by: Heraldo Muñoz
- Succeeded by: Osvaldo Puccio

Minister of the Interior
- In office 24 May 2005 – 11 March 2006
- President: Ricardo Lagos
- Preceded by: José Miguel Insulza
- Succeeded by: Andrés Zaldívar

Undersecretary of Regional and Administrative Development
- In office 11 March 2000 – 3 March 2003
- President: Ricardo Lagos
- Preceded by: Marcelo Schilling
- Succeeded by: Adriana Delpiano

Personal details
- Born: 20 September 1953 (age 73) Santiago, Chile
- Party: National Party (1971−1973); Party for Democracy (1987−present)
- Spouse: María Inés Maturana
- Children: Three
- Parent(s): Carlos Vidal Vargas; María Salinas Opazo
- Education: Bernardo O'Higgins Military Academy; University of Chile (Lic)
- Occupation: Politician
- Profession: Teacher of History

Francisco Javier Vidal Salinas (born 20 September 1953) is a Chilean politician and scholar.

In 1971, he began his political career at the rightist National Party.

He was Chile's Minister of National Defense from March 2009 to March 2010. Before this position he served as Minister Secretary General of Government of Chile during the administrations of Ricardo Lagos and Michelle Bachelet and Interior Minister during Lagos's mandate.

He is a professor of history at the University of Chile.

== Family and education ==
He was born in Santiago on 20 September 1953, the son of Carlos Enrique Vidal Vargas, a bank employee who ended his working life at a construction company, and María Cecilia Salinas Opazo, a Catholic homemaker. His parents separated when he was young.

His sister Adriana married surgeon Julio Montt, who served as a councillor, deputy, and Minister of Health during the administration of President Patricio Aylwin. One of their sons, Julio Montt Vidal, also pursued a political career, serving as Undersecretary of Healthcare Networks during the administration of President Ricardo Lagos.

He completed his primary and secondary education at the German School of Santiago, the Military School of Bernardo O'Higgins ―which he entered at the age of sixteen and where he met future agents of the Pinochet regime like Armando Fernández Larios and Álvaro Corbalán― and finally at Liceo Rafael Sotomayor in Las Condes. There he became acquainted with right-wing activists, most notably Andrés Allamand, whom he later described as a "personal friend".

In 1974, he entered the Pedagogical Institute of the University of Chile, graduating as a state-certified teacher of history, geography, and civics. It was there that he shifted toward the political left. He also completed the coursework for a master's degree in history at the same university, but never submitted his thesis or took the final degree examination. This later led to an interpellation in the Chamber of Deputies of Chile by deputy Nicolás Monckeberg of National Renewal, who challenged the accuracy of his curriculum vitae.

== Political career ==
=== From the National Party to the PPD ===
He began his political career in the youth department of the right-wing National Party (PN). During the government of the Popular Unity (UP), he was a member of the Rolando Matus Command, a paramilitary youth group of the National Party organized to confront the Brigada Ramona Parra (BRP) of the Communist Party of Chile and the Brigada Elmo Catalán (BEC) of the Socialist Party of Chile (PS).

In 1987, he joined the Party for Democracy (PPD), a political movement that brought together social democrats and liberals opposed to the military regime of General Augusto Pinochet. He served as a grassroots organizer, communal president in Las Condes, candidate for mayor, president of the PPD's professional branch, coordinator of the party's parliamentary campaign, and vice president of the organization.

=== Eduardo Frei Ruiz-Tagle government ===
In 1993, he served as a consultant to the Higher Education Council and to the Higher Education Division of the Ministry of Education.

At the same time, he served as secretary of the Faculty of Economic Sciences at the Central University, a position he held until 1998. In 1994, he was appointed executive director of the Chile 21 Foundation, where he remained until 2000. In 1998 and 1999, he served as dean of the Faculty of Economic and Administrative Sciences at the Central University. In the public sector, he was also a member of the Metropolitan Regional Government Council between 1993 and 2000.

=== Lagos and Bachelet governments ===
Following the inauguration of President Ricardo Lagos—of whom he became one of the closest collaborators—he was appointed Undersecretary for Regional and Administrative Development within the Ministry of the Interior on 11 March 2000. In that role, he developed a close working relationship with Interior Minister José Miguel Insulza. Over time, he became one of the most influential figures of the PPD within the administration.

He left the post on 3 March 2003 to become Minister Secretary-General of Government, serving as government spokesperson and assuming a much more prominent public profile.

Following the resignation of Interior Minister José Miguel Insulza to assume the position of Secretary General of the Organization of American States, Vidal was appointed Interior Minister on 24 May 2005.

Upon the beginning of Michelle Bachelet's first administration, he was appointed chairman of the board of Televisión Nacional de Chile (TVN), the state-owned television network. He left the position in December 2007 after being reappointed as Minister Secretary-General of Government, following the resignation of Ricardo Lagos Weber. At the same time, he served as director of the School of Government at the Alberto Hurtado University.

In that office, he became known for his direct and sometimes controversial comments on current Chilean political affairs and other public issues. In addition, between 2006 and 2007, he served as a member of BancoEstado's Board of Directors.

In January 2008, the Chamber of Deputies of Chile approved an interpellation against him concerning his alleged involvement in the Chiledeportes affair, which involved accusations that public funds had been diverted to support governing coalition electoral campaigns.

On 12 March 2009, he handed over his position to fellow party member Carolina Tohá and moved to the Ministry of National Defense, where, at the request of President Bachelet, he replaced José Goñi. He remained in the defense portfolio until the end of the administration on 11 March 2010.

On 8 April 2014, during the second Bachelet administration, he was appointed a member of the Presidential Advisory Commission on Decentralization and Regional Development. The following month, Bachelet again appointed him to the board of the state-owned financial institution BancoEstado.

=== Presidential pre-candidacy ===
Later, on 5 January 2021, together with Heraldo Muñoz and Jorge Tarud, he registered his candidacy for his party's primary election ahead of the 2021 Chilean presidential election.

However, none of the candidacies advanced, and the party ultimately decided to support Socialist candidate Paula Narváez, former chief of staff and cabinet minister under Bachelet. She later competed in the 2021 Unidad Constituyente presidential primary, finishing second behind Christian Democrat Yasna Provoste.
