= Norwalk High School =

Norwalk High School may refer to:

- Norwalk High School (California), Norwalk, California
- Norwalk High School (Connecticut), Norwalk, Connecticut
- Norwalk High School (Iowa), Norwalk, Iowa
- Norwalk High School (Ohio), Norwalk, Ohio
