= Iván de la Maza =

Chilean politician

Intendant of the Valparaíso Region
- In office 11 March 2006 – 11 March 2010
- President: Michelle Bachelet
- Preceded by: Luis Guastavino
- Succeeded by: Raúl Celis Montt

Regional Governor of Valparaíso
- In office 7 July 2003 – 11 March 2006
- Preceded by: Vicente García Olave
- Succeeded by: Ricardo Bravo Oliva

Member of the Chamber of Deputies
- In office 11 March 1994 – 11 March 1998
- Preceded by: Jorge Molina Valdivieso
- Succeeded by: Juan Bustos Ramírez
- Constituency: 12th District (Limache, Olmué, Quilpué, and Villa Alemana)

Personal details
- Born: 18 October 1940 (age 85) Talcahuano, Chile
- Party: Christian Democratic Party
- Spouse: María Verónica Molgaard Zamora
- Children: Three
- Parent(s): Guillermo De la Maza; Teresa Maillet
- Education: Pontifical Catholic University of Valparaíso (BA)
- Occupation: Politician
- Profession: Teacher of History

Iván de la Maza Maillet (born 18 October 1940) is a Chilean teacher and politician who was Intendant of the Valparaíso Region.

== Biography ==
=== Early life ===
The son of Guillermo De la Maza and Teresa Maillet, he was born on 18 October 1940 in Talcahuano. Then, his family moved to Valparaíso Region, so Iván de la Maza attended the Rubén Castro School.

De la Maza carried out his higher education at the Pontifical Catholic University of Valparaíso (PUCV) History Institute, where he obtained his BA as teacher in 1967. Similarly, there he was president of the Students Center.

Once graduated, he worked at the Ventanas Power Plant as industrial relationer. By the other, from 1968 he served as Communications Director of the PUCV.

== Political career ==
He began his political militancy during his time at the university, when he joined the Christian Democratic Party.

In 1967, he was elected alderman for Valparaíso and later he was president of the Provincial Confederation of Municipalities.

During Juan Andueza Silva's tenure as mayor, he held the position of regional coordinator of the General Directorate of Sports (DIGEDER) in the Valparaíso Region.

In the 1993 Chilean general election, he was elected as deputy for the 12th District of Olmué, Limache, Villa Alemana and Quilpué. Thus, in the 1994−1998 period, De la Maza's work in the Congress was related to the commissions like Regionalization, Planning or Social Development. Similarly, he was a replacement deputy in the commissions of Natural Resources, National Assets or Environment.

During president Ricardo Lagos' government (2000−2006), he was appointed as Provincial Governor of Valparaíso, holding the position from July 2003 to 11 March 2006, when Lagos left the presidency and assumed Michelle Bachelet.

During Bachelet's first government (2006−2010), De la Maza was appointed as Intendant of the Valparaíso Region, holding that position during the whole Bachelet's period.

In June 2008, he was decorated by the Investigations Police of Chile with the «Honor of Merit» medal for his commitment and efforts made to reduce crime rates during his work as intendant.
