= Fidel Espinoza =

Chilean politician

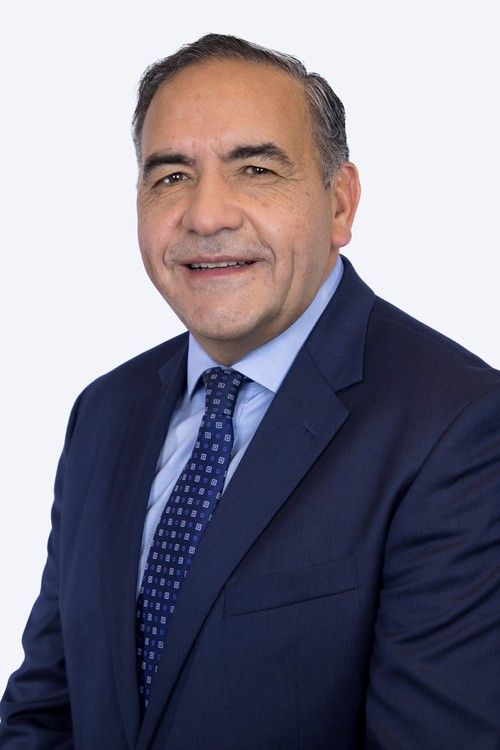

Member of the Senate of Chile
- Incumbent
- Assumed office 11 March 2022
- Constituency: 13th Circumscription (Los Lagos Region)

Head of the Chamber of Deputies of Chile
- In office 22 March 2017 – 11 March 2018
- Preceded by: Osvaldo Andrade
- Succeeded by: Maya Fernández

Member of the Chamber of Deputies of Chile
- In office 11 March 2018 – 11 March 2022
- Preceded by: Creation of the district
- Constituency: District 25
- In office 11 March 2002 – 11 March 2018
- Preceded by: Víctor Reyes Alvarado
- Succeeded by: Dissolution of the district
- Constituency: 56th District (Fresia, Frutillar, Llanquihue, Los Muermos, Puerto Octay, Puerto Varas, Purranque, Puyehue and Río Negro)

Personal details
- Born: 24 January 1970 (age 56) Puerto Montt, Chile
- Party: Socialist Party
- Children: Two
- Parent(s): Luis Espinoza; María Sandoval
- Education: University of Los Lagos (BA); International University of Andalucía (MA)
- Occupation: Politician
- Profession: Teacher of History

Fidel Edgardo Espinoza Sandoval (born 24 January 1970) is a Chilean teacher and politician, affiliated with the Socialist Party. He served as a member of the Chamber of Deputies from 2006 to 2022, and since March 2022 has been serving as a senator representing the Los Lagos Region.

He is known for his confrontational style, strong media presence, and active role in political oversight within the National Congress.

The son of historic Socialist leader Luis Espinoza, his political career has been marked by a strong territorial focus and a discourse centered on defending rural communities and southern Chile. Espinoza has been involved in several controversies both within and outside his party, clashing with factions of his own political group—particularly over issues of integrity, political alliances, and internal leadership.

Throughout his career, he has held important positions such as President of the Chamber of Deputies (2017–2018), from which he promoted an agenda focused on political control and transparency. Despite tensions within the ruling coalition, he has managed to maintain a solid electoral base in the Los Lagos Region, establishing himself as one of the most visible figures of contemporary Chilean socialism.

== Biography ==
Fidel Espinoza was born on October 20, 1972, in Puerto Montt, the capital of the Los Lagos Region. He is the son of Luis Espinoza, a Socialist Party leader and former regional governor (intendente).

From a young age, he was involved in political and social activities, influenced by his family's strong political commitment. He completed his secondary studies in the region and later earned a degree in History and Geography education from the University of Los Lagos.

He began his career as a schoolteacher, working in public institutions, which allowed him to build close ties with rural communities and the Chilean education system. His involvement in party politics led him to leadership roles within the Socialist youth organizations, quickly projecting him as a promising parliamentary figure.

From the start, his discourse focused on territorial inequalities, centralism, and the need for greater decentralization. Throughout his political life, he has been known for his direct, polemical, and often combative style—frequently challenging authorities and structures of power both inside and outside his party.

== Political career ==
Fidel Espinoza was first elected to the Chamber of Deputies in the 2005 parliamentary elections, representing the former 56th district, which included several rural communes of the Los Lagos Region. He was re-elected in 2009, 2013, and 2017, serving four consecutive terms in the Lower House.

During his tenure as deputy, he was an active member of the Natural Resources, Education, and Internal Government committees.

In 2017, he became President of the Chamber of Deputies, making him one of the most visible public figures in Congress. In that role, he promoted legislative transparency and oversight of public spending, gaining both support and criticism across the political spectrum.

His term was also marked by public confrontations with regional authorities and members of the government, denouncing cases of corruption and administrative malpractice.

In the 2021 elections, he was elected senator for the Los Lagos Region, marking his transition to the Upper House. Since then, he has maintained his combative style, criticizing government decisions and opposing political agreements that, in his view, compromise principles for convenience.

His tense relations with figures within his own party—such as Senator Isabel Allende and sectors of the Socialist Party leadership—have positioned him as an internal dissident advocating a “recovery of the original ideals of Chilean socialism.” Despite these frictions, Espinoza continues to enjoy strong media visibility and a loyal electoral base in the country’s south.
