= Hernán Pinto =

Chilean lawyer and politician (1953–2020)

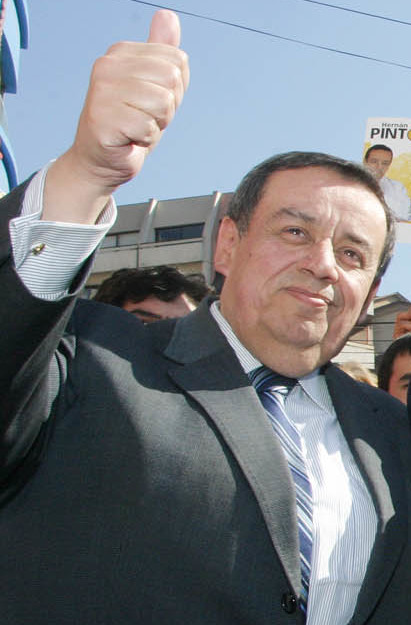
- Hernán Pinto (2009)

Mayor of Valparaíso
- In office 26 September 1992 – 6 December 2004
- Preceded by: Oscar Suárez Pizarro
- Succeeded by: Aldo Cornejo

Mayor of Valparaíso
- In office 11 March 1990 – 27 March 1992
- Preceded by: Pablo Staig Araujo
- Succeeded by: Oscar Suárez Pizarro

Personal details
- Born: Hernán Eduardo Pinto Miranda; January 17, 1953
- Died: July 29, 2020 (aged 67) Viña del Mar, Chile
- Party: Christian Democratic Party
- Education: University of Chile
- Profession: Lawyer; Politician

Hernán Eduardo Pinto Miranda (17 January 1953 – 29 July 2020) was a Chilean lawyer, politician and member of the Christian Democratic Party (PDC).

== Biography ==
He served as the mayor of Valparaíso, Chile's second largest city, from March 1990 to March 1992 and again from 26 September 1992 until 6 December 2004. Under Pinto, Valparaíso was declared Chile's "Cultural Capital" in May 2003 and a UNESCO World Heritage Site in July 2003.

In 2009, Pinto ran for the Senate of Chile seeking to represent the Quinta Costa constituency, but lost the election.

Pinto ran to regain his old job, Mayor of Valparaíso, in 2012. He won the primary election over Paula Quintana to win the Christian Democratic Party (PDC) nomination in the mayoral general election. However, Pinto was defeated in the Valparaíso mayoral general election by incumbent Mayor Jorge Castro Muñoz.

On 3 July 2020, Pinto was admitted to Clínica Reñaca, a hospital in Viña del Mar, for respiratory failure caused by COVID-19 during the COVID-19 pandemic in Chile. He remained on a ventilator in the hospital's intensive care unit from July 3 until his death. Hernán Pinto died in the hospital from complications of COVID-19 on 29 July 2020, at the age of 67.
