= Francisco Encina =

Chilean politician

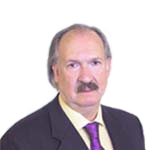

President of the Chamber of Deputies
- In office 14 August 2008 – 18 March 2009
- Preceded by: Guillermo Ceroni
- Succeeded by: Rodrigo Álvarez

Member of the Chamber of Deputies
- In office 11 March 1994 – 11 March 2010
- Constituency: 8th District

Personal details
- Born: 18 December 1943 (age 82) Concepción, Chile
- Party: Socialist Party
- Education: University of Chile
- Profession: Lawyer

José Francisco Encina Moriamez (born 18 December 1943) is a Chilean politician who served as President of the Chamber of Deputies and as a member of the Chamber of Deputies, representing District 8 of the Coquimbo Region.

== Early life and family ==
He was born on 18 December 1943 in Concepción, the son of Francisco Javier Encina González and Suzanne Marie Moriamez Villalón, a native of Ovalle.

He is married to Marta Elisa Lobos Inzunza, former councilor (2000–2004) and mayor of the Municipality of Ovalle (2004–2012). He is the father of Viviana, Loretto, and Gonzalo.

== Professional career ==
He completed his primary education at Colegio Padres Franceses in Concepción and his secondary education at Colegio San Agustín in Santiago. He later enrolled in the School of Sociology at the University of Chile, where he obtained his degree. He subsequently earned a Master’s degree in Economic Development from the University of Vienna in Austria.

Between 1968 and 1973, he served as an academic at the University of Chile and at the Pontifical Catholic University of Valparaíso. Concurrently, from 1970 to 1973, he was Director of National Programs at the National Institute for Professional Training (INACAP).

After the military coup of 11 September 1973, he lived in Austria, where he studied and worked as a researcher at the Institute for Advanced University Studies (1975–1979) and as a consultant to the Austrian Institute of International Politics (1980–1986).

In 1986, he was authorized to return to Chile and, from that year until 1990, served as a regional leader of his party in the Coquimbo Region. From 1992 onward, he was a member of the Central Committee of the Socialist Party of Chile.

Between 1990 and 1993, he was appointed Regional Ministerial Secretary of Economy for the Coquimbo Region and simultaneously taught at the University of La Serena.

== Political career ==
In 1966, during his university years, he began his political career as a student leader in the Faculty of Social Sciences at the University of Chile, a position he held until 1969. The following year, he joined the Socialist Party of Chile (PS), serving on its Professional and Technical Commission.

In 1993, he was elected deputy for the Socialist Party representing District No. 8 (Coquimbo, Ovalle, and Río Hurtado), Coquimbo Region, for the 1994–1998 legislative period, obtaining 13,360 votes (13.64% of the valid votes cast). He was re-elected for the same district in December 1997 (1998–2002), with 22,301 votes (25.81%); in December 2001 (2002–2006), with 19,544 votes (20.37%); and in December 2005 (2006–2010), with 15,511 votes (14.99%). Alongside his list partner from the Christian Democratic Party (Chile), first Jorge Pizarro Soto and later Patricio Walker, he achieved the electoral "doubling" (doblaje) in District No. 8.

For the December 2009 elections, he decided not to seek re-election to the Chamber of Deputies for District No. 8.
