= María Maluenda =

Chilean actress and politician (1920–2011)

Her Excellency María Maluenda
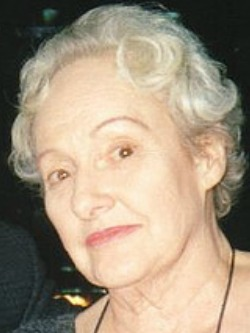

Member of the Chamber of Deputies
- In office 11 March 1990 – 11 March 1994
- Succeeded by: María Antonieta Saa
- Constituency: 17th District, Conchalí, Huechuraba, and Renca
- In office 1965–1969
- Constituency: 7th Departmental Group, 1st District

Provisional President of the Chamber of Deputies of Chile
- In office 11 March 1990 – 11 March 1990
- Succeeded by: José Antonio Viera-Gallo

Personal details
- Born: María Adela Maluenda Campos; 6 March 1920 Santiago, Chile
- Died: 29 August 2011 (aged 91) Santiago, Chile
- Resting place: Parque del Recuerdo
- Party: Communist Party (1958–1973); Party for Democracy (1987–2011)
- Spouse: Roberto Parada (1946–1986)
- Children: José Manuel Parada; María Soledad Parada
- Education: University of Chile
- Occupation: Actress, politician

María Adela Maluenda Campos (6 March 1920 – 29 August 2011) was a Chilean actress and politician. She was a militant of the Communist Party and the Party for Democracy, and a member of the Chamber of Deputies from 1965 to 1969 and 1990 to 1994.

She was an active defender of human rights during the Chilean military dictatorship, especially after the death of her son, the sociologist José Manuel Parada Maluenda in the Caso Degollados (Degollados Case).

== Biography ==
The daughter of Juan Agustín Maluenda Vidaurre and María Campos Gutiérrez, María Maluenda completed her primary and secondary studies at Liceo No. 4 in Recoleta. She attended the University of Chile, where she studied law for one year and pedagogy in Spanish for another. Later she dedicated herself to acting, in which she was self-taught.

In 1941, Maluenda was part of the group that founded the University of Chile's Experimental Theater. Its first production was La guardia cuidadosa, starring Maluenda. Three years later, she was the protagonist of the film Hollywood es así, directed by Jorge Délano, one of the first Chilean talkies. She also performed in radio dramas and worked for the BBC.

In 1946, she married actor Roberto Parada, with whom she had two children, José Manuel and María Soledad. Maluenda joined the Communist Party in 1958. She was a member of the Chamber of Deputies for that party for the term 1965–1969, elected by the 7th Departmental Grouping "Santiago", 1st District. During the government of Salvador Allende, she was the ambassador of Chile to Vietnam from 1972 to 1973.

On 29 March 1985, her son José Manuel, who worked at the Vicariate of Solidarity, was kidnapped and murdered. His body appeared the next day along with those of two other professionals. The event was known as the Caso Degollados (Degollados Case), and, after investigations, it was learned that the crimes had been perpetrated by agents of the Carabineros Communications Directorate (DICOMCAR).

During the second half of the 1980s, Maluenda participated in the Movement for Free Elections, which sought to end the military regime through enrollment in the electoral registers and the plebiscite. The actress criticized the role of extremist groups, such as the Manuel Rodríguez Patriotic Front, and she left the Communist Party because of fundamental differences. In 1987, Maluenda participated in the founding of the Party for Democracy.

In the 1989 parliamentary elections, she stood for deputy representing that party in the 17th District, being elected for the legislative term 1990–1994. She was Provisional President of the Chamber on 11 March 1990 and chaired the installation session under the provisions of Article 1 – Transitory, paragraph 2 of Constitutional Law No. 18,918 of the National Congress. She was a member of the Permanent Commission on Foreign Relations, Interparliamentary Affairs, and Latin American Integration, and on Human Rights, Nationality, and Citizenship.

She did not stand for reelection for the next term.

María Maluenda died in Santiago on 29 August 2011. There was a viewing of her remains in the hall of honor of the Santiago seat of the Chamber of Deputies, and her funeral was held on 30 August in the Parque del Recuerdo cemetery.
