= Luis Corvalán =

Chilean politician (1916–2010)

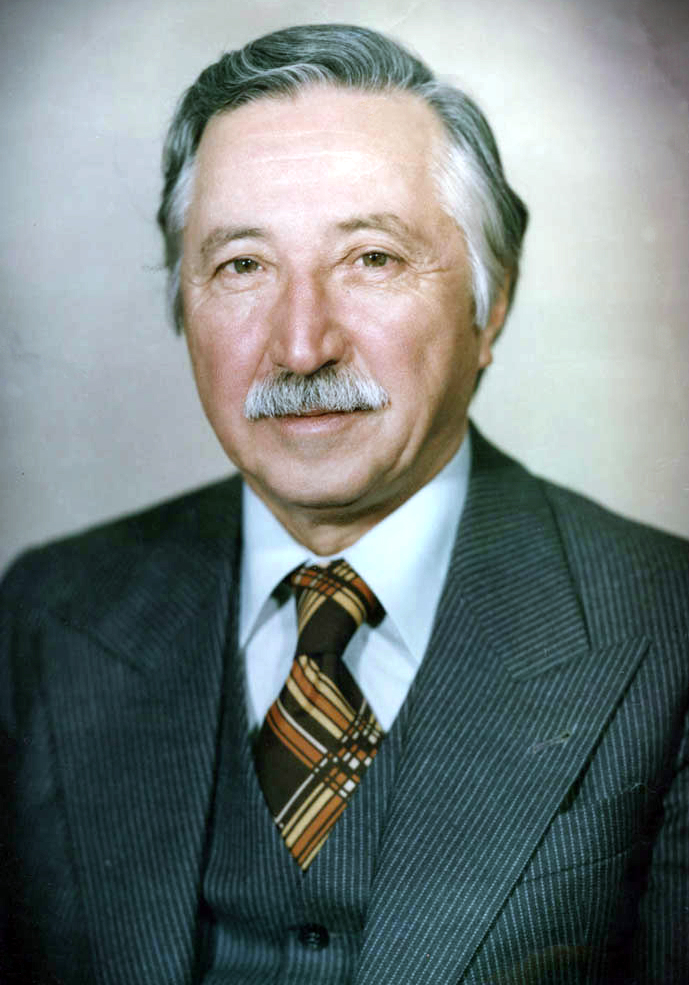
- Corvalán in 1977

Senate of Chile
- In office 15 May 1969 – 21 September 1973 (Note: National Congress of Chile dissolved by decree no. 27 of the Government Junta)
- Constituency: Aconcagua and Valparaíso

Senate of Chile
- In office 15 May 1961 – 15 May 1969
- Constituency: Ñuble, Concepción and Arauco

Personal details
- Born: 14 September 1916 near Puerto Montt, Chile
- Died: 21 July 2010 (aged 93) Santiago, Chile
- Party: Communist (from 1932)
- Spouse: Lily Castillo Riquelme
- Children: 4
- Awards: Lenin Peace Prize (1974); Order of Klement Gottwald (1977); Order of Karl Marx (1977)

Luis Nicolás Corvalán Lepe (14 September 1916 – 21 July 2010) was a Chilean politician, teacher, and writer. He was the general secretary of the Communist Party of Chile (PCCh) for more than three decades and was twice elected to the Senate of Chile.

Corvalán was detained by the Government Junta following the 1973 Chilean coup d'état. The USSR worked relentlessly for Corvalán's freedom, preparing plans for a military strike against Chile to rescue him, and orchestrating an international pressure campaign aimed at securing his parole. In 1976, the junta released Corvalán in exchange for the freedom of the Soviet dissident Vladimir Bukovsky, with the prisoner swap occurring in Switzerland. He later underwent plastic surgery to disguise his features before secretly returning to Chile to help organize opposition to the presidency of Augusto Pinochet.

== Early life and education ==
Luis Corvalán was born on 14 September 1916 to Moisés Corvalán Urzúa and Adela Lepe Roa near Puerto Montt, Chile; one of six children. His father abandoned the family when Corvalán was five. He was certified as a primary school teacher in 1934.

== Career ==
After spending the period 1935-1936 teaching in Iquique and Valdivia, he started contributing to the communist newspapers Frente Popular and El Siglo.

=== Early political activism ===
Corvalán joined the Communist Party of Chile (PCCh) in the city of Chillán in 1932, at age 15, shortly after the end of the presidency of Carlos Ibáñez del Campo. In 1950—during a period when the PCCh was outlawed—he was elected to the party's central committee.

=== Party leadership and elected office ===
In 1958, the Communist Party was legalized in Chile and Corvalán was selected as its general secretary. Also in 1958, Corvalán was elected to Concepción municipal council. He was subsequently elected to the Senate of Chile, where he represented Ñuble, Concepción and Arauco from 1961 to 1969. He was re-elected in 1969 to represent Aconcagua and Valparaíso.

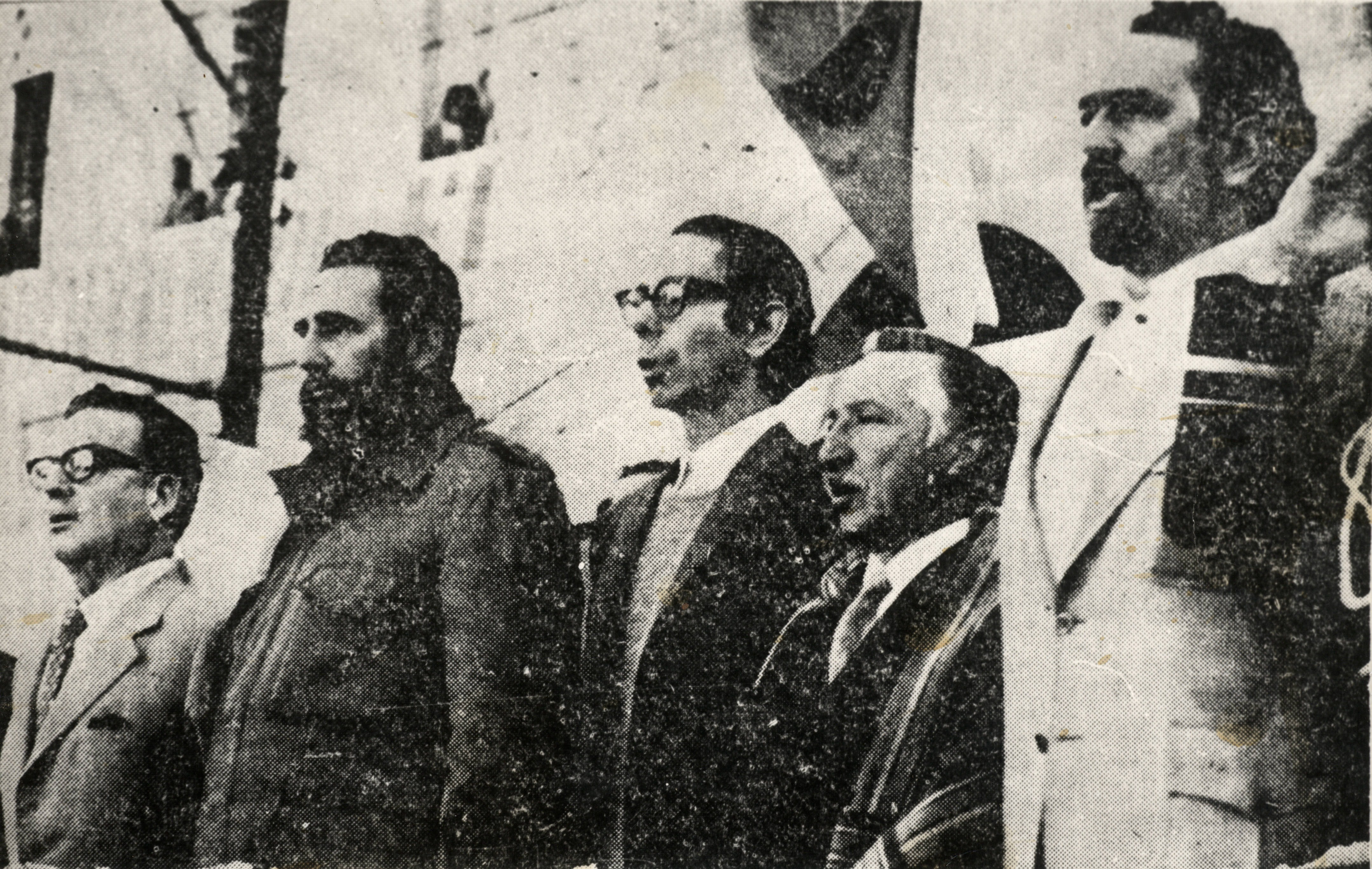
Salvador Allende, Fidel Castro, Carlos Altamirano, and Luis Corvalán (left to right) pictured in 1971.

In his political positions, Corvalán displayed steadfast support for Soviet policies. In 1967 — during a period when the USSR was experiencing tension with Cuba over the matter of Aníbal Escalante — he criticized Cuba's interventions into the political affairs of other Latin American nations, writing in Pravda that "the specific characteristics of one revolution, such as the Cuban revolution, can be repeated in another place but not in the same form". The following year, he supported the Warsaw Pact invasion of Czechoslovakia.

On domestic questions, he was open to collaboration with non-communists, taking the party into the Popular Action Front with the Socialist Party and several minor parties, despite challenges posed between the Communist Party's organizing strategy of a cross-class coalition and the Socialist Party's vision of a worker-centered approach. A 1964 analysis by the U.S. embassy in Chile concluded that Corvalán based the decision to align with Salvador Allende's socialists on a "sureness of expectation that serious disagreements with Communists on Allende’s part will not arise" and that "even should Allende be tempted to turn on Communist partners once in office he would be unable do so". The coalition between the Communist Party and Socialist Party later continued in the Unidad Popular movement.

A circa 1975 poster from the United States calling for the release of Corvalán

Corvalán has been credited with the growth of the Communist Party during the period of reemergence and, by 1970, it was receiving up to 20 percent of the vote in congressional elections and counted among its members the poet Pablo Neruda, the writer Francisco Coloane, and the songwriter Víctor Jara.

In 1970, Allende was elected president of Chile at the head of a Unidad Popular government. Corvalán was a central figure in the ruling movement and The New York Times credited him with pushing Allende "left faster than was thought practical and probably faster than the President wanted". Still, Corvalán occasionally criticized the president's management, blaming his policies for the country's high inflation. In 1970, Corvalán visited Moscow to press for more Soviet aid to Chile.

=== Arrest and campaign for release ===
Two weeks after the 1973 Chilean coup d'état, Corvalán was placed under arrest on a charge related to alleged subversion of the Chilean armed forces. He was initially held at the O'Higgins Military Academy in Santiago. In response to a letter of inquiry from the secretary-general of the Organization of American States, foreign minister Ismael Huerta wrote that:

With respect to the Chilean citizen, Mr. Luis Corvalán, I must inform Your Excellency that he is detained in the Military Academy of Chile, where he is enjoying excellent treatment, as journalists and foreign personages have verified. Mr. Corvalán will be brought to trial, under the country's applicable laws, for the crimes he is accused of. The Government of Chile assures Your Excellency that, at his trial, the standards established by the Chilean legal code for all citizens of the country will be strictly observed.

During an October 1973 session of the United Nations General Assembly, a shouting match erupted among delegates after Soviet ambassador Yakov Malik issued a demand that the UN intercede to prevent Corvalán's execution, which was rumored to be forthcoming. Chilean ambassador Raúl Bazán denied that any such execution was planned, prompting a heated exchanged between Bazán and Malik that Saudi Arabian ambassador Jamil Baroody tried to break up. This prompted Bazán to call Baroody a "fool", which, in turn, provoked Baroody into an argument with the Chilean. F. Bradford Morse, representing the United States, attempted to calm the conflagration before Leopoldo Benites, presiding, was able to restore order.

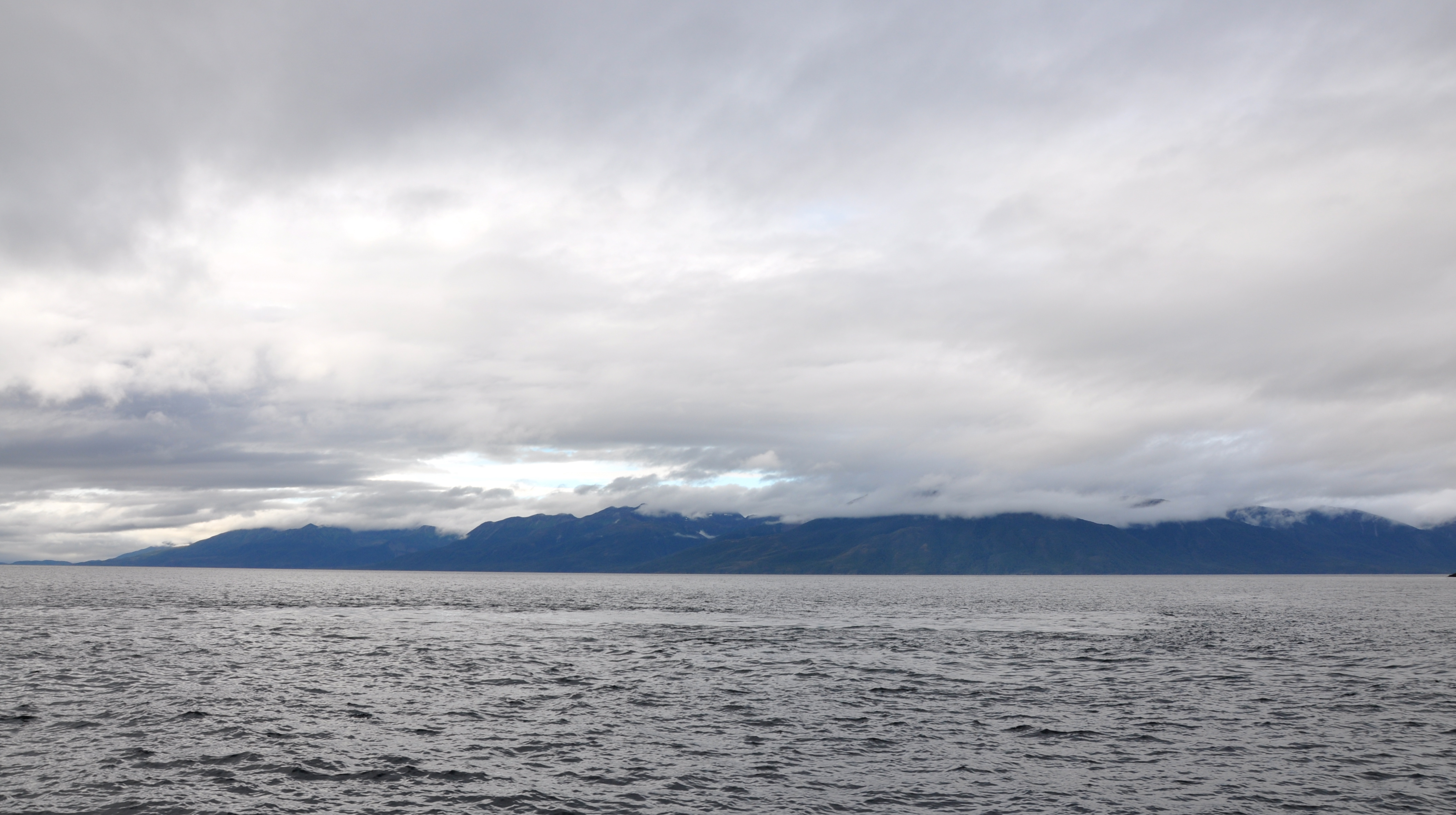
In 1975, the KGB planned an operation to rescue Corvalán from Dawson Island (pictured).

Corvalán was subsequently transferred from the military academy to the prison colony on Dawson Island.

In 1975, the KGB conducted satellite reconnaissance of Dawson Island and drew up plans to launch an assault against it. In a 1998 lecture, Nikolai Leonov described the importance to The Center in "how to pay this respect to our class colleagues, our ideological brothers, if you will" and went on to provide some operational details of the proposed strike which would use spetsnaz delivered by helicopters operating from a disguised merchantman to overpower the island's guards and airlift Corvalán to a waiting Red Fleet submarine. The helicopters would then be destroyed in deep ocean so as to leave no physical evidence of the attack. According to Leonov, when KGB staff presented the plan to Kremlin leadership "they looked at us as if we were half crazy".

The Soviet attack on Dawson Island never occurred and, later that year, Corvalán was moved to a mainland prison due to a bleeding stomach ulcer. In August, he underwent surgery for appendicitis.

During the years of Corvalán's detention, an international campaign organized by the Soviet Union agitated for his release. The Society of Czechoslovak Lawyers issued a demand that they be allowed to provide pro bono legal counsel to Corvalán; the United Nations Commission on Human Rights made a formal request for his release from imprisonment; and demonstrations in support of Corvalán were held around the world in places such as West Germany, Italy, and the United States. Chilean artists living in the Netherlands formed the "Brigada Luis Corvalán", a collective that installed public art pieces protesting the Pinochet government. In East Germany, a series of two commemorative postage stamps memorializing Corvalán and the deceased president Salvador Allende, titled "Solidarity with the People of Chile", were released.

In 1975, the Inter-Parliamentary Union (IPU), acting on testimony given to an ad hoc investigative committee regarding the detention of Corvalán, enacted a resolution calling the matter "a grave international concern" and requested the Chilean government "to release all political prisoners forthwith". Testimony was provided to the IPU's committee by a variety of organizations and individuals, including the Women's International League for Peace and Freedom, Amnesty International, the International Union of Students, the Women's International Democratic Federation, Luis Guastavino, and others.

According to Michael Zourek of Charles University's Centre for Ibero-American Studies, the Soviet Union sought to catalyze international support for its policies in Latin America by positioning itself as the prime advocate for the imprisoned Corvalán who was presented as a hero. Zourek writes that "the image of Corvalán as a martyr and a symbol of resistance were created on the basis of exaggeration of his moral qualities and vivid depiction of his detention".

=== Release ===
In November 1976, according to Amnesty International, the Government Junta announced the release of 300 political prisoners, while an additional 17 were soon after released subject to expulsion from the country. The following month, Chile agreed to release Corvalán provided that the Soviet government similarly released the dissident Vladimir Bukovsky. The idea for a prisoner swap was first proposed by Andrei Sakharov and was brokered by the United States, as Chile and the Soviet Union had previously ended diplomatic relations. The transfer of prisoners occurred in Zürich, Switzerland.

Following the exchange, Corvalán was flown to Moscow where he received a rapturous welcome and was feted as the guest of honor at the 70th birthday of Leonid Brezhnev. Corvalán's victory tour continued in January with a welcome ceremony in the Palace of the Republic in Berlin on the occasion of his visit to the German Democratic Republic. During the ceremony, Dean Reed performed a Spanish-language rendition of the African-American spiritual hymn "I Shall Not Be Moved".

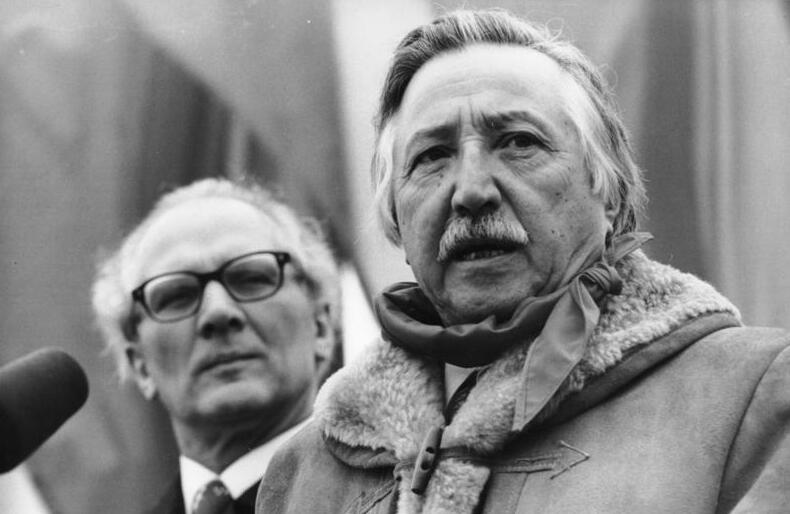
Corvalán pictured with East German leader Erich Honecker in 1977

The Argentine newspaper La Opinión, commenting on the exchange, opined that it demonstrated "Santiago and Moscow have very similar concepts about the value of freedom and of people; both invoke elevated principles but reduce man to an object of barter."

=== Years abroad ===
During his years abroad, Corvalán maintained his position as general secretary of the PCCh—which was now operating underground—leading it from the USSR.

At a rally organized in his honor in Moscow in January 1977, Corvalán appealed to the Chilean Christian Democratic Party to join with the communists and an international front of "all democratic forces" against Pinochet. He called for the different Chilean political parties to temporarily put aside their conflicts and focus on the overthrow of the Government Junta.

In 1979, he declared the necessity of armed resistance to Pinochet, resulting in an abandonment of the party's previous position of peaceful resistance. For the first time, the PCCh began cooperating with the Revolutionary Left Movement, working together to carry out several attacks on state institutions. During this period, the PCCh began backing the Manuel Rodríguez Patriotic Front (FPMR), which came into being in 1983 and embarked on a series of armed actions, including the attempted assassination of Augusto Pinochet; attacks on the offices of the Associated Press; bombings of temples of the Church of Jesus Christ of Latter-Day Saints and restaurants frequented by American tourists; and the kidnapping of Germán Obando, a corporal in the Carabineros de Chile.

In advance of the 1988 Chilean presidential referendum, Corvalán led a faction of the Communist Party that sought to boycott the election, preferring instead to continue the guerilla insurgency.

=== Later years ===
In the 1980s, Corvalán underwent plastic surgery in the Soviet Union to alter his appearance. The procedures were reportedly performed by the alleged KGB-affiliated surgeon Aleksandr Shmelev; according to an account given by Corvalán in 2011, the surgery was done by a "Soviet Russian who had fought in the war". Disguised with new facial features, he secretly returned to Chile in 1988 to help organize opposition to the Pinochet government.

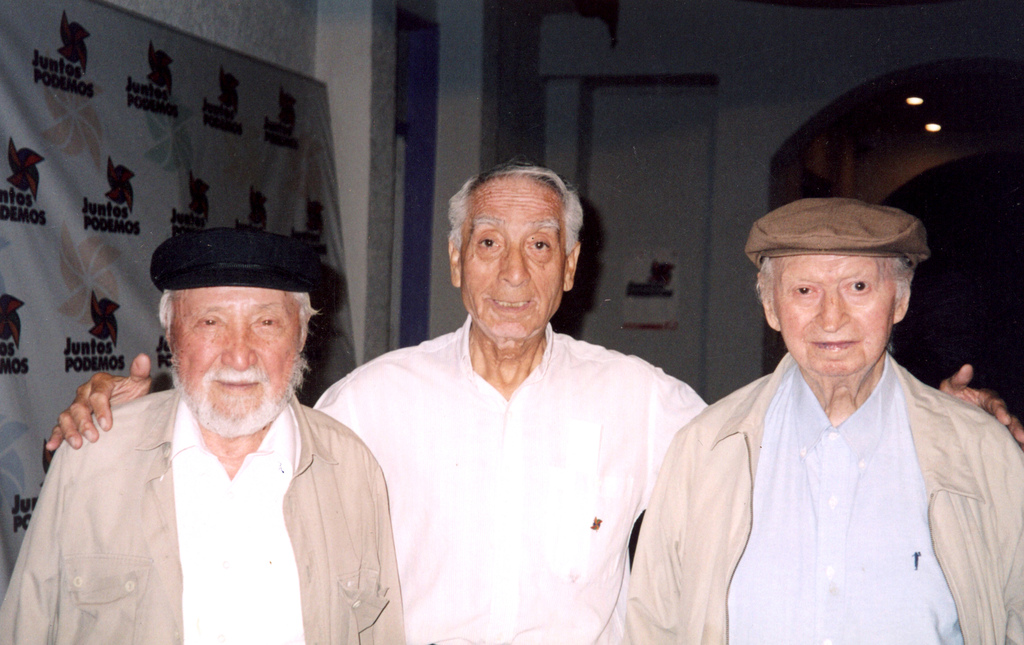
Corvalán with Ernesto Araneda Briones and Volodia Teitelboim, ca. 2007

Corvalán stepped down as general secretary of the Communist Party of Chile in 1989, ending more than three decades of his leadership.

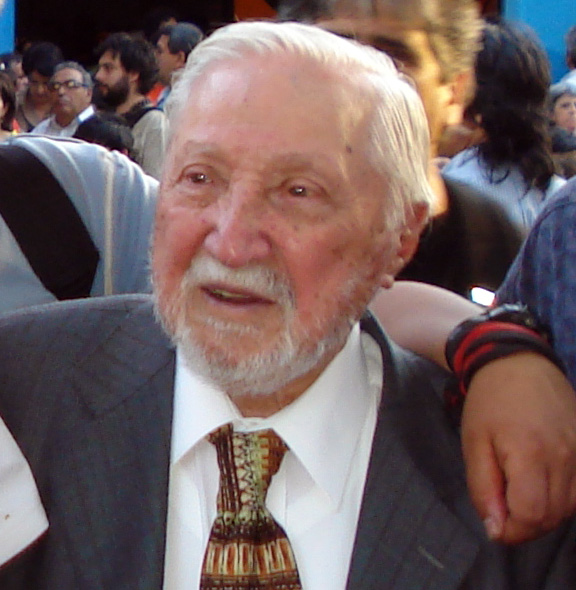
Corvalán pictured in Santiago, Chile, in 2009.

== Personal life ==
Corvalán married Lily Castillo Riquelme and, with her, had three daughters and a son, Luis Alberto. Luis Alberto was detained at the Campo de Prisioneros Chacabuco following the coup of 1973. He was released in 1975 and left the country for Bulgaria, where he died of a heart attack, reportedly due to cardiac damage resulting from the methods used in his interrogation during his imprisonment.

Corvalán died at the age of 93 on 21 July 2010, in Santiago.

== Honors and legacy ==
Corvalán was awarded the Lenin Peace Prize in 1974 in absentia. He was also invested into the Order of Klement Gottwald and the Order of Karl Marx, both in 1977.

In 2023, Russian Federation foreign minister Sergey Lavrov, in an article for the Rossiyskaya Gazeta observing the 50th anniversary of the 1973 Chilean coup, recalled that Russia, as successor state to the Soviet Union, was responsible for demanding "the release of Chile's heroic son Luís Corvalán from his imprisonment in a concentration camp, and succeeded in attaining this aim".

=== Cultural impact in East Germany ===
"Was wollen wir trinken"
- Oktoberclub (1977)
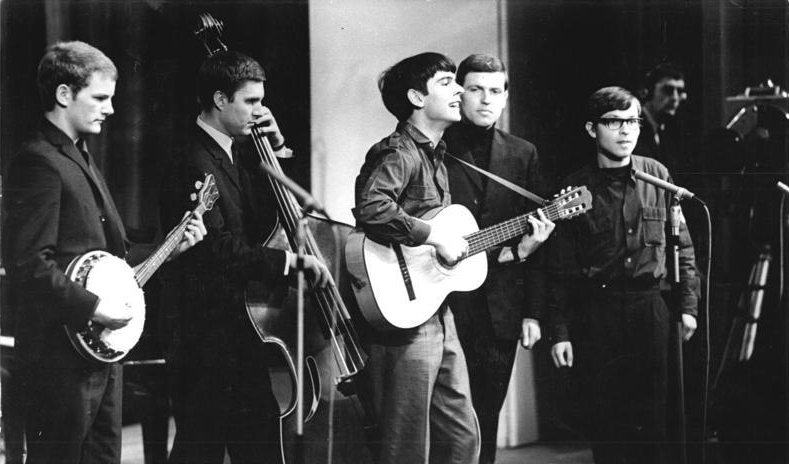
- Oktoberclub (pictured in 1967)
- via SoundCloud

During the 1970s, Chilean politics and resistance to Pinochet became a popular theme among East German youth, even those who had limited contact with the ruling Socialist Unity Party of Germany. Chileans like Corvalán presented an appealing vision of radical activism that was more vibrant than that offered by the ossified government of the GDR.

Leonardo Rodríguez, a Chilean musician residing in East Germany during the 1970s, recalled the consistent appeal of the idea of the liberation of Chile to Germans:

With Vietnam, things went up, and they went down. Palestine: one day, yes; tomorrow, no. But with Chile it was something that I felt was much deeper and there was always a high spirit of solidarity—Corvalán, Allende, Pinochet—terms that population, not just in the cities, but also in the small villages ... it was something of the heart ... for the Germans of the GDR, the theme [of Chile] was a theme of the heart.

The German folk band Oktoberklub refers to Corvalán in the lyrics of its 1977 song "Was wollen wir trinken": "On Red Square, Corvalen stands; He toasts with us, to our cause; let's drink to Luis Corvalán!"

Corvalán's 1977 tour of East Germany was documented in the DEFA film Wir werden siegen durch die Solidarität (We Will Overcome Through Solidarity), directed by Joachim Hadaschik. The film showed Corvalán's travels in East Germany where he met leaders of the Socialist Unity Party, gave public speeches, and attended rallies where Germans and foreign expatriates celebrated his freedom.

== See also ==
- Álvaro Cunhal
- Group of Personal Friends
