= Juan Bustos =

Juan Bustos may refer to:

- Juan Bustos (footballer) (born 1992), Costa Rican footballer
- Juan Bustos (politician) (1935–2008), Chilean politician and lawyer
- Juan Bustos Valenzuela (1874–?), Chilean journalist and politician
