= Rocío Cantuarias =

Chilean constituent

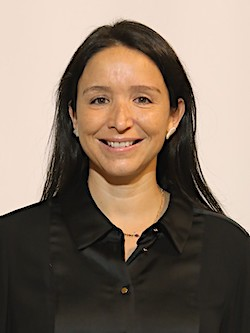

Member of the Constitutional Convention of Chile
- In office 4 July 2021 – 4 July 2022
- Constituency: 20th District

Personal details
- Born: 20 June 1978 (age 48) Concepción, Chile
- Party: Independent
- Spouse: Sergio Escobar
- Children: Two
- Parent(s): Eugenio Cantuarias; María Soledad Rubio
- Education: University of Concepción (LL.B); University of Chile (LL.M)
- Occupation: Pundit
- Profession: Lawyer

Rocío Cantuarias Rubio (born 20 March 1978) is a Chilean lawyer, academic, and former member of the Chilean Constitutional Convention.

She served in the Convention from 2021 to 2022, having been elected from District 20 as an independent. After her term, she began to gain increased public visibility through frequent media appearances and political commentary.

== Biography ==
Cantuarias studied law at the University of Concepción, where she earned her degree in Legal and Social Sciences. She was sworn in as a lawyer before the Supreme Court of Chile on April 30, 2007. She later completed a Master of Business Administration (MBA) and a Master's degree in Taxation, both at the University of Chile.

She has held teaching positions at several universities, lecturing in Constitutional law, Tax law, Corporate law, and Economic law at institutions such as the University of Concepción, the Universidad del Desarrollo, and Andrés Bello National University.

In addition, she is a founding partner of FBC Legal, a legal consultancy focused on providing services to companies with a social responsibility approach. She is the author of the book Opportunities in the Management of Legal Firms, published by Thomson Reuters in 2019.

== Political career ==
In the 2021 Constitutional Convention elections, she ran as an independent candidate for District 20 (Biobío Region), obtaining 16,927 votes (5.56%). She was elected as a member of the Constitutional Convention and served from July 4, 2021, to July 4, 2022.

During her term, she served on the Budget and Internal Administration Committee, the Fundamental Rights Committee, and the Transitional Norms Committee.

Throughout the constitutional process, she advocated for individual liberties, the strengthening of the rule of law, and a subsidiary and efficient State focused on institutional effectiveness and development.

== Personal life ==
She is the daughter of Eugenio Cantuarias Larrondo, former senator and former mayor of Talcahuano, and María Soledad Rubio Vila. She is married to Sergio Escobar Miranda and is the mother of two children. She resides in the city of Concepción.
