= Marina Huerta Rosales =

Chilean politician

Mayor of Valparaíso
- In office 25 November 2016 – 6 December 2016
- Preceded by: Jorge Castro Muñoz
- Succeeded by: Jorge Sharp

Councilwoman of Valparaíso
- In office 28 September 1992 – 25 November 2016

Personal details
- Born: 27 September 1934 (age 92) Valparaíso, Chile
- Party: Christian Democratic Party
- Education: University of Valparaíso
- Occupation: Politician
- Profession: Midwife

Marina Huerta Rosales (born 27 September 1934) is a Chilean politician who served the most part of her career as councilwoman of Valparaíso.

She was mayor of Valparaíso for a little over than one week after Jorge Castro's resignation to compete in the 2017 parliamentary elections.
