= Raúl Allard Neumann =

Chilean head of university

Intendant of the Valparaíso Region
- In office 29 September 2000 – 26 December 2000
- President: Ricardo Lagos
- Preceded by: Josefina Bilbao
- Succeeded by: Marco Antonio Núñez

Undersecretary of Education
- In office 11 March 1990 – 1993
- Preceded by: Arturo Zavala
- Succeeded by: Luis Alberto de la Maza

Head of the Pontifical Catholic University of Valparaíso
- In office 1968 – 11 September 1973
- Preceded by: Arturo Zavala
- Succeeded by: Luis Alberto de la Maza

Councilman of Vina del Mar
- In office 1968–1973

Personal details
- Born: Chile
- Party: Christian Democratic Party
- Education: Pontifical Catholic University of Valparaíso (LL.B); Princeton University (LL.M); Southern Methodist University (PhD)
- Occupation: Scholar
- Profession: Lawyer

Raúl Edgardo Allard Neumann is a Chilean scholar and politician who has been intendant, councilman and head of the Pontifical Catholic University of Valparaíso (PUCV) during the 1968 democratic reform process. He also served as undersecretary of education during Patricio Aylwin's government.

Neumann is a professor of international relations at the PUCV and author of publications in his country and abroad, he did his postgraduate studies in the US. From 1968 to 1973, Allard Neumann headed the PUCV university reform process as rector and, simultaneously, he was alderman (councillor) of Vina del Mar.

Allard Neumann worked for twelve years at the OAS, where he became executive secretary of education, science and culture. Similarly, he carried out managerial duties or in representation of Chile in Asia-Pacific Economic Cooperation (APEC), Unesco or Educational Mercosur. He was also undersecretary of education, national director of customs and intendant of Valparaíso during Ricardo Lagos' government.

== Biography ==
In 1961, he obtained his BA in laws at the PUCV. Then, he continued his postgraduate studies after obtaining scholarships from Ford and Parvin foundations (Princeton) or from Fulbright (Southern Methodist).

In the 1968 PUCV head elections, Allard Neumann faced Alberto Vial and received support from the President Eduardo Frei Montalva (Christian Democratic Party).

On 16 October 2018, Allard Neuman was honoured by the Senate of Chile.
