= Ricardo Bravo Oliva =

Chilean politician

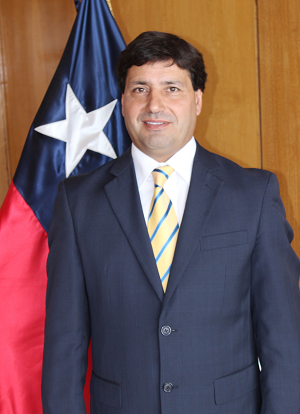

Intendant of the Valparaíso Region
- In office 11 March 2014 – 17 August 2015
- President: Michelle Bachelet
- Preceded by: Raúl Celis Montt
- Succeeded by: Gabriel Aldoney

Personal details
- Born: 20 July 1964 (age 62) Valparaíso, Chile
- Party: Socialist Party
- Relatives: Jaime (brother)
- Education: Pontifical Catholic University of Valparaíso (BA)
- Profession: Civil engineer

Ricardo Bravo Oliva is a Chilean civil engineer and politician who served as Intendant of the Valparaíso Region.

== Political career ==
During the whole Michelle Bachelet's first government (2006-2010), he held the position of Governor of Valparaíso.

In 2011, he registered his candidacy with Abel Gallardo at the headquarters of the Socialist Party of Chile to compete with the then mayor of Valparaíso Jorge Castro in the 2012 Chilean municipal election. However, he withdrew from contention.

In 2013, he announced his candidacy for deputy for 14th District of Viña del Mar and Concón. However, he was defeated by his list partner, Rodrigo González Torres (PPD). Similarly, he also was defeated by the UDI candidate Osvaldo Urrutia. The following year he was appointed regional mayor of Valparaíso by Bachelet in her second government. In 2015, he supported the unsuccessful candidacy of Camilo Escalona for the presidency of the PS during the internal elections of that year.

=== Electoral record ===
Candidate	Pact	Party	Votes	%	Result
Rodrigo González Torres	Nueva Mayoría	PPD	40.195	28,08	Deputy
Osvaldo Urrutia Soto	Alianza	UDI	37.746	26,37	Deputy
Carlos Gómez González	Alianza	RN	21.892	15,29	
Ricardo Bravo Oliva	Nueva Mayoría	PS	16.861	11,78	
Patricio Muñoz Castillo	Independent	IND	9.501	6,63	
Víctor Ugarte Duque	PH	PH	7.576	5,29	
Eric Nahuelpi Villar	Si tú quieres, Chile cambia	PRO	6.253	4,36	
Jaime Sánchez Villegas	Si tú quieres, Chile cambia	PRO	3.098	2,16	
