= Marco Antonio Núñez =

Chilean politician

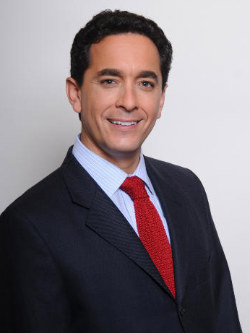
- Núñez in 2013

President of the Chamber of Deputies
- In office 17 March 2015 – 22 March 2016
- Preceded by: Aldo Cornejo
- Succeeded by: Osvaldo Andrade

Member of the Chamber of Deputies
- In office 11 March 2006 – 11 March 2018

Intendant of Valparaíso Region
- In office 2001–2003
- Preceded by: Raúl Allard Neumann
- Succeeded by: Luis Guastavino

Personal details
- Born: 2 September 1966 (age 59) Viña del Mar, Chile
- Party: Party for Democracy

Marco Antonio Núñez Lozano (born 2 September 1966) is a Chilean politician. He was President of the Chamber of Deputies of Chile between 17 March 2015 and 22 March 2016. Núñez is a member of the Party for Democracy and was a member of the Chamber of Deputies between 2006 and 2018.

== Biography ==
Núñez was born in Viña del Mar. He lived a period in exile in Venezuela and returned to Chile in 1981. While studying at the University of Chile, he was President of the University of Chile Student Federation in 1989. In 1992 he obtained his degree. He subsequently went to the United States and obtained a Master's in Public Health from Harvard University in 1998. Four years later, he obtained a PhD in Public Health Politics from Johns Hopkins University.

== Political career ==
Between 2001 and 2003 Núñez was intendant of Valparaíso Region. The next year he ran for mayor in San Felipe but was not elected. In the parliamentary elections of 2005, 2009 and 2013 Núñez was elected for District 11 of the Valparaíso Region. On 17 March 2015 Núñez became President of the Chamber of Deputies. He succeeded Aldo Cornejo of the Christian Democratic Party.

Regarding a receipts scandal of parliamentarians, Núñez stated that there were likely to be several politicians who should step down from office. Later during his presidency of the Chamber of Deputies Núñez stated he wanted Chile to have one of the five most transparent parliaments worldwide. Núñez was succeeded as President of the Chamber of Deputies by Osvaldo Andrade on 22 March 2016. During the 2017 Chilean general election he ran as candidate for the Senate of Chile for constituency 6 Valparaíso, but was not elected. His term in the Chamber of Deputies ended in 2018.

Núñez is married and has two children.
