= Guillermo Ceroni =

Chilean politician

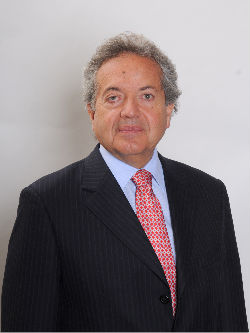

Member of the Chamber of Deputies
- In office 11 March 1994 – 11 March 2018
- Preceded by: Manuel Matta Aragay
- Succeeded by: District dissolved
- Constituency: 40th District

Provisional President of the Chamber of Deputies
- In office 7 August 2008 – 14 August 2008
- Preceded by: Juan Bustos
- Succeeded by: Francisco Encina

Personal details
- Born: 30 July 1946 (age 80) Parral, Chile
- Party: Party for Democracy
- Education: University of Chile (LL.B)
- Profession: Lawyer

Guillermo Arturo Ceroni Fuentes (born 30 July 1946) is a Chilean politician who served as a parliamentarian.

In the Chamber of Deputies, he represented the District 40 of the Maule Region. He served as Provisional President of the Chamber of Deputies following the death of Juan Bustos.

== Biography ==
He was born in Parral on 30 July 1946. He is the son of Enrique Javier Ceroni Morales and Aída Mercedes Fuentes Muñoz. He is married to Carmen Amalia Duch Roveri.

He completed his primary education at the Liceo de Hombres de Parral. He continued his secondary education at the Seminario School of Chillán and at the San Ignacio School in Santiago. After finishing school, he entered the Faculty of Law of the University of Chile, where he obtained his law degree.

Professionally, between 1971 and 1974 he served as adviser to the legal director of the former Agrarian Reform Corporation (CORA) in Santiago. From 1974 to 1979, he worked as lawyer for the Perquilauquén Agricultural Cooperative Ltda., and between 1974 and 1992, he practiced law in Parral while also carrying out agricultural activities.

In 1987, he was appointed lawyer for Amnesty International. Between 1988 and 1989, he served as legal counsel for the Government of the German Democratic Republic in the Colonia Dignidad case. Between 1991 and 1992, he was president of the irrigators’ association of Parral and, in 1992, also served as president of the Rice Growers’ Association of the same city.

== Political career ==
He began his political career in 1967, when he joined the Popular Unitary Action Movement (MAPU), where he held various leadership positions until 1973.

In 1988, he was a leader of the “No” campaign in Parral for the national plebiscite. The following year, he was among the founders of the Party for Democracy (PPD) in Parral, assuming the presidency of the party at the local level and standing as a pre-candidate for Deputy.

Between 1993 and 1994, he served as a regional councillor of the PPD.

In 2023, he ran as a candidate for the Constitutional Council representing the Party for Democracy within the Todo por Chile list in the Maule Region but was not elected, obtaining 2.58% of the vote.

On 18 July 2024, he was appointed Regional Ministerial Secretary (Seremi) of Transport and Telecommunications of the Maule Region by President Gabriel Boric.

=== Honours ===
On 7 October 2009, he was awarded the Order of Commander by the Italian Ambassador to Chile, Paolo Casardi, in recognition of his contribution to strengthening relations with Italy.
