= Luis Guastavino =

Chilean politician (1931–2021)

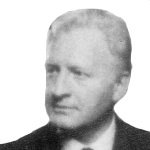

Intendant of the Valparaíso Region
- In office 11 April 2003 – 11 March 2006
- President: Ricardo Lagos
- Preceded by: Marco Antonio Núñez
- Succeeded by: Iván de la Maza

Member of the Chamber of Deputies of Chile
- In office 15 May 1965 – 21 September 1973

Personal details
- Born: 29 December 1931 Valparaíso, Chile
- Died: 28 December 2021 (aged 89) Santiago, Chile
- Party: Communist Party; Socialist Party
- Education: University of Chile (BA)
- Occupation: Politician
- Profession: Teacher

Luis Guastavino Córdova (29 December 1931 – 28 December 2021) was a Chilean teacher and politician who was Intendant of the Valparaíso Region. He also served as deputy between 1965 and 1973.

== Early life ==
From 1951 to 1961, he taught at schools like the Eduardo de la Barra High School, the Deutsche Schule, the English School of Quillota and the Pedagogical Institute of the University of Chile.

In 1961, he was elected alderman (councilor) for Valparaíso in representation of the Communist Party of Chile.

== Political career ==
=== From the 60s to Pinochet's dictatorship ===
In 1965, he was elected deputy for the Province of Valparaíso for three consecutive terms: 1965−1969, 1969−1973 and 1973−1977, last of them which was disrupted by the 1973 military coup.

From 1974 to 1984, Guastavino was exiled by Augusto Pinochet's dictatorship. Similarly, in that period, he worked in the UN Human Rights Commission in Geneva. On the other hand, he also served the United Nations General Assembly in New York and the UNESCO, where he was delegate in its 1976 General Conference in Nairobi, Kenya.

During his period in exile, he progressively distanced himself from communism, so he left the PC after founding a movement that questioned the guidelines of the party: Democratic Left Party (PDI). Later, that organization incorporated to the Socialist Party of Chile.

=== Return to democracy ===
In March 1990, Patricio Aylwin became president and, in December, appointed Guastavino as executive director of the Social Reality Research Center (CIRES). In 1992, he organized with CIRES the International Seminar «Decentralization and Regionalization: Chile, Spain, Italy and Sweden», with the sponsorship of the Ministry of Foreign Affairs, the Undersecretary of Regional and Administrative Development (SUBDERE), the UN, the CEPAL, among others.

From April to June 1993, he was invited by Spanish regional governments, autonomous communities and specialized institutions as well as from Italy or Sweden to develop studies and exchanges on regionalization, decentralization and State Reform. A year later, he was summoned to work on regionalization at the SUBDERE, specifically, for the organization and development of his proposal to create the Regional Universities-Governments Program, which he directed since its official launch on 11 April 1995.

In 1994, he was appointed by Aylwin as his representative in the board of directors of the University of Playa Ancha (UPLA). Then, in 2000, he joined the board of directors of the University of Tarapacá in Arica. During those years, he taught in universities such as the University of Chile, the Pontifical Catholic University, the UMCE, the UPLA and almost all of the 20 regional universities of his country.

In 1997, he ran for a seat as deputy for the V Region of Valparaíso, but he failed to reclaim it after obtaining a 18.44% of the votes under the Christian-Democratic Aldo Cornejo (33.43%) and Francisco Bartolucci from the Independent Democratic Union (31.71%).

From April 2003 to March 2006, he was appointed by president Ricardo Lagos as Regional Intendant of Valparaíso.

== Personal life and death ==
Guastavino died in Santiago on 28 December 2021, at the age of 89.
