= Eugenio Cantuarias =

Chilean politician

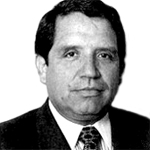

Member of the Senate of Chile
- In office 11 March 1990 – 11 March 1998
- Preceded by: Creation of the Circumscription
- Succeeded by: José Antonio Viera-Gallo
- Constituency: Bío-Bío Region (14th Circumscription)

Mayor of Talcahuano
- In office 1981 – 11 March 1988
- Appointed by: Augusto Pinochet
- Preceded by: Fernando Carrasco
- Succeeded by: Marco Antonio Lama

Personal details
- Born: 1 July 1948 (age 78) Santiago, Chile
- Party: Independent Democratic Union
- Spouse: María Soledad Rubio
- Children: Three (among them, Rocío)
- Parent(s): Eugenio Cantuarias Maturana; Laura Larrondo
- Education: University of Concepción
- Occupation: Politician
- Profession: Engineer

Eugenio Gustavo Larrondo Larrondo (born 1 July 1948) is a Chilean politician who served as senator.

== Biography ==
=== Family and youth ===
He was born in Concepción on 1 July 1948. He was the son of Eugenio Orlando Cantuarias Maturana and Laura Estela Larrondo Castillo. He married María Soledad Rubio Vila and had three children.

=== Professional career ===
He completed his primary education at the Salesian School of Concepción and his secondary education at the Internado Nacional Barros Arana in Santiago, graduating in 1965. He later enrolled in the Chemical Civil Engineering program at the University of Concepción, obtaining his degree in 1971.

Between 1970 and 1972, he was a member of the University Council of the University of Concepción. In 1973, he joined the Special Planning and Restructuring Commission. From 1973 to 1979, he served as a full member of the University Council and as an instructor at the Institute of Chemistry and Mathematics of the same university.

In 1976, he traveled to Brazil, where he completed a master’s degree in Sanitary Engineering in São Paulo. He served as an adjunct professor of Sanitation for Civil Engineering students at the Faculty of Engineering of Taubaté, São Paulo, and as a visiting professor at the Institute of Sanitary Engineering of Rio de Janeiro, teaching courses related to water quality.

He later pursued further studies, earning a Master of Science in Civil Engineering from the University of Washington in the United States.

In his professional career, he held various positions, including Manager of the Operations Division of the Chilean Safety Association (ACHS).

== Political career ==
His political involvement began at the Internado Nacional Barros Arana in Santiago, where he served as president of the student council. Between 1964 and 1965, he was national president of the Federation of Secondary Students of Chile.

In 1969, he was a founding leader of the Federation of Students of the University of Concepción (FEC) and, in 1970, ran as a candidate for its presidency representing the Gremialist Front. During this period, he met gremialism leader Jaime Guzmán, maintaining contact throughout the government of the Popular Unity coalition.

On 23 March 1981, he was appointed Mayor of Talcahuano, a position he held until 11 January 1988.

With the formal establishment of the Independent Democratic Union (UDI) as a political party on 22 October 1988, he became a member of its first executive board as one of its vice-presidents. He served in that role during the party presidencies of Jaime Guzmán (1988–1990), Julio Dittborn Cordua (1990–1992), and Pablo Longueira (1998–2004).

In the 1989 parliamentary elections, he ran for the Senate of Chile representing the Democracy and Progress pact in the 12th Senatorial District (Coastal Biobío Region) for the 1990–1998 term. He was elected with 83,663 votes, representing 16.29% of the valid ballots cast.

On 8 July 1994, in his capacity as president of the Senate Standing Committee on Education, he was appointed a member of the National Commission for the Modernization of Education, established by President Eduardo Frei Ruiz-Tagle.

On 23 January 1995, President Frei appointed him as a member of the National Commission for Older Adults, an advisory body to the President of the Republic on policies, plans, and programs for senior citizens.

In the 1997 parliamentary elections, he again sought a Senate seat for the same district, obtaining 97,984 votes (22.91% of valid votes), but was not elected, as the Concertación candidates José Antonio Viera-Gallo and Hosain Sabag together secured more than 60% of the votes.

On 8 February 1999, President Ricardo Lagos created the Commission for the Evaluation of Quality of Undergraduate Programs of Autonomous Higher Education Institutions, appointing him as a member.

In 2005, both Renovación Nacional and the UDI offered him senatorial candidacies, which he declined.

Following the resignation of Jacqueline van Rysselberghe as Intendant of the Biobío Region in April 2011, President Sebastián Piñera offered him the position, which he also declined.

On 30 November 2011, he was appointed by President Piñera as Executive Vice-President of the National Mining Company of Chile (ENAMI), a position he held until 3 May 2013.
