= Jorge Molina Valdivieso =

Chilean politician (born 1932)

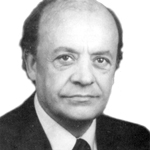

President of Chamber of Deputies
- In office 21 July 1993 – 11 March 1994
- Preceded by: José Antonio Viera-Gallo
- Succeeded by: Jorge Schaulsohn

Member of the Chamber of Deputies
- In office 11 March 1990 – 11 March 1994
- Preceded by: District created
- Succeeded by: Iván de la Maza

Personal details
- Born: 16 February 1932 (age 94) Talcahuano, Chile
- Party: Christian Democratic Party (−1969); Popular Unitary Action Movement (1969−1973); MAPU Obrero Campesino (1973); Socialist Party (−1988); Party for Democracy (1988−present)
- Education: Pontifical Catholic University of Valparaíso
- Profession: Lawyer

Jorge Molina Valdivieso (born 16 February 1932) is a Chilean politician who served as President of the Chamber of Deputies and as a member of the Chamber of Deputies, representing District 12 of the Valparaíso Region.

== Early life and family ==
Molina was born on 16 February 1932 in Talcahuano. He was the son of Jorge Molina López, an officer of the Chilean Navy, and Adriana Valdivieso Quehille. He married María Angélica Baeza Salas; they have six children.

He completed his primary education at the Colegio de los Padres Franceses in Viña del Mar and his secondary education at the Liceo Manuel de Salas in Santiago.

Between 1951 and 1953, he worked at Banco Edwards in Valparaíso and began his studies at the School of Law of the University of Chile, Valparaíso campus. He later continued at the School of Law of the Pontifical Catholic University of Valparaíso (PUCV), graduating with distinction. His thesis, Proyecto de ley de enseñanza experimental dependiente de las universidades, received the national FIDE award. He qualified as a lawyer in 1961 and established his own law practice.

After graduating, he was appointed professor of Civil Law at the School of Law of the PUCV. In 1964, he was designated Secretary General of the university and served as acting rector. In 1967, he became director of the newspaper La Unión of Valparaíso.

== Political career ==
His political career began in 1948 when he was elected president of the Federation of Secondary Students of Chile.

In the 1969 parliamentary elections, he ran for the Senate representing the Christian Democratic Party in the Third Provincial Grouping (Aconcagua and Valparaíso) but was not elected.

In 1969, he participated in the founding of the Movimiento de Acción Popular Unitaria (MAPU) and moved his law practice to Santiago. In 1970, he served as legal advisor to the Central Bank of Chile.

Following the coup d’état of 11 September 1973, he worked as a lawyer for the Committee for Peace in Chile, defending numerous political prisoners and detainees who had disappeared. In 1976, he took part in the creation of the Vicariate of Solidarity and was nominated that year for a UNESCO world award for human rights education. He also participated in founding the opposition magazine APSI.

In 1978, he became director of the Constitutional Studies Group (Grupo de los 24), which presented proposals for a democratic constitution during the debate over the 1980 Constitution. That same year, he was appointed counselor of the newly created Chilean Human Rights Commission.

He later participated in the Socialist Convergence and, in 1980, led the merger of MAPU with the Socialist Party of Chile, becoming its undersecretary general. In 1983, he became one of the directors of the Democratic Alliance. In 1985, he took part in the National Accord for a Democratic Transition. In 1986, he drafted the document Bases de sustentación del Régimen Democrático, which preceded the creation in 1988 of the Concertación de Partidos por la Democracia.

=== Return to democracy ===
In 1987, he participated in the founding of the Party for Democracy (PPD), serving two terms as vice president.

In the 1989 parliamentary elections, he was elected Deputy for District No. 12, Valparaíso Region, obtaining the highest vote total in the district with 42,590 votes (37.79% of the validly cast ballots).

In 1993, he ran for re-election in District No. 13 (Isla de Pascua, Juan Fernández, and Valparaíso) but was not elected.

On 12 September 1994, he was appointed by President Eduardo Frei Ruiz-Tagle to the Board of Directors of the University of Playa Ancha, serving until 20 May 1997. In 1995, he joined the Superior Council of the National Corporation for Reparation and Reconciliation. On 17 June 1996, his nomination to the Board of Directors of Televisión Nacional de Chile (TVN) was proposed to the Senate and approved on 9 July 1996.

In the December 1997 parliamentary elections, he ran for the Senate representing the Party for Democracy in the Sixteenth Circumscription (Los Lagos Region), but was not elected.

In 2001, President Ricardo Lagos appointed him Ambassador of Chile to Guatemala, a position he held until 2006.

On 27 April 2007, he was appointed member of the Board of Directors of the University of Valparaíso as representative of President Michelle Bachelet, serving as its president until 30 December 2009.
