= Antonio Leal Labrín =

Chilean politician, sociologist, and philosopher (1950–2021)

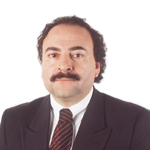
- Labrín in 2014

President of the Chamber of Deputies
- In office 11 March 2006 – 20 March 2007
- Preceded by: Gabriel Ascencio
- Succeeded by: Patricio Walker

Member of the Chamber of Deputies
- In office 11 March 1998 – 11 March 2010
- Preceded by: Erick Villegas
- Succeeded by: Lautaro Carmona Soto
- Constituency: Atacama Region

Secretary-General of the Partido Democrático de Izquierda
- In office 1991 – 26 August 1994
- President: Fanny Pollarolo
- Preceded by: position established
- Succeeded by: position abolished

Personal details
- Born: 10 January 1950 Santiago, Chile
- Died: 17 November 2021 (aged 71) Santiago, Chile
- Party: PCCh (1964–1973); Partido Democrático de Izquierda (1991–1994); PPD (1996–2021)

Antonio Leal Labrín (10 January 1950 – 17 November 2021) was a Chilean politician. A member of the Party for Democracy, he served in the Chamber of Deputies of Chile from 1998 to 2010 and was its President from 2006 to 2007.

== Biography ==
Antonio Leal Labrín was born on 10 January 1950 in Santiago, Chile. He was the son of José Leal San Martín and Ana Labrín Fuentes.

He was married to Romy Schmidt, who served as Minister of National Assets during the government of President Michelle Bachelet and later as Executive Director of the Museum of Memory and Human Rights. He was the father of one child.

=== Scholar career ===
He completed his primary and secondary education at Liceo Manuel Barros Borgoño in Santiago. He studied sociology at the University of Concepción (UdeC). He later earned a Master's degree in International Political Relations and a PhD in Philosophy from the University of Szeged in Hungary.

He initially worked in academia until the military coup of 11 September 1973, which interrupted his teaching career. After returning to Chile, he resumed teaching as a professor in the Master's Program in Public Management and at the School of Administration of the University of Santiago, Chile; in the Master's Program in Political Science at the University of Chile; and in courses on Philosophy and Political Thought at the Schools of Journalism and Law of Andrés Bello National University.

As of May 2021, he served as Director of the School of Sociology and Director of the Master's Program in Political Science and Contemporary Thought at Universidad Mayor.

== Political career ==
He began his political involvement in secondary school, serving as president of his school's student council and joining the Communist Youth of Chile during the period when Gladys Marín was Secretary General of the organization. While at university, he served as president of the Federation of Students of the UdeC.

Leal continued his university teaching career until 11 September 1973, when he was arrested following the military coup. He was held at the Talcahuano naval base, then transferred to Quiriquina Island, and later imprisoned in Concepción. He remained detained for more than two years. After his release, he went into exile in Italy, where he lived for fifteen years.

During his time in Europe, he collaborated with the international solidarity movement for human rights in Chile. He worked as a professor of Political Science and researcher in Social Sciences at the University of Rome and served as a visiting professor at the Universities of Zaragoza (Spain), Szeged (Hungary), and Siena (Italy). He also published political and cultural articles in La Repubblica, Paese Sera, and Rinascita.

While in exile, Leal remained a member of the Communist Party (PC) but resigned upon returning to Chile. In 1991, he joined Participación Democrática de Izquierda (PDI), becoming its Secretary General. After the dissolution of PDI in 1994, he joined the Party for Democracy (PPD), serving on its board, Political Commission, and twice as national vice president.

During the government of President Eduardo Frei Ruiz-Tagle, he worked as political adviser at the Ministry General Secretariat of the Presidency. He also contributed to the newspapers El Mercurio, La Época, La Nación, La Tercera, La Segunda, and El Diario, and was the author of essays and books published in Chile and Italy.

In the 1997 parliamentary elections, he was elected as a deputy representing the Party for Democracy (PPD) for District No. 5 (Copiapó, Chañaral, and Diego de Almagro) in the Atacama Region for the 1998–2002 legislative term. He received 13,242 votes (27.04%). He was re-elected in 2001 for the 2002–2006 term with 29,382 votes (51.05%), and again in December 2005 for the 2006–2010 term with 30,032 votes (49.25%). In all three elections, he obtained the highest vote share in the district.

In the December 2009 elections, he chose not to seek re-election to the Chamber of Deputies and instead ran for the Senate representing the Atacama Region within the Concertación and Juntos Podemos coalition; however, he was not elected.

In June 2012, he was appointed for an eight-year term as a member of the Board of Directors of Televisión Nacional de Chile (TVN).

He died in Santiago on 17 November 2021.
