= Osvaldo Andrade =

Chilean Socialist politician

The Honourable Osvaldo Andrade
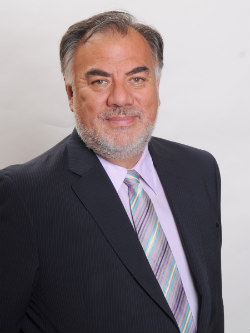

President of the Chamber of Deputies
- In office 22 March 2016 – 22 March 2017
- Preceded by: Marco Antonio Núñez
- Succeeded by: Fidel Espinoza

Leader of the Socialist Party of Chile
- In office 21 August 2010 – 17 May 2015
- Preceded by: Camilo Escalona
- Succeeded by: Isabel Allende

Member of the Chamber of Deputies
- In office 11 March 2010 – 11 March 2018
- Preceded by: Isabel Allende
- Succeeded by: District dissolved
- Constituency: 29th District

Minister of Labor and Social Security
- In office 11 March 2006 – 10 October 2008
- President: Michelle Bachelet
- Preceded by: Yerko Ljubetic
- Succeeded by: Claudia Serrano

Personal details
- Born: 6 February 1953 (age 73) Santiago, Chile
- Party: Socialist Party
- Spouse: Myriam Olate Berríos
- Children: 4
- Relatives: Carmen Andrade (sister)
- Education: Catholic University of Chile; University of Salamanca
- Website: Official website

Osvaldo Andrade Lara (born 2 June 1953) is a Chilean Socialist politician. After studying law at the Pontifical Catholic University of Chile, Andrade joined the Socialist Party in 1968. He served as director of the Young Socialists. Following the Chilean coup of 1973, he was detained at the Estadio Nacional and at Villa Grimaldi.

He was Minister of Labor and Social Security in the government of Chilean President Michelle Bachelet from 2006 to 2008. On 22 March 2016 he became President of the Chamber of Deputies. He succeeded Marco Antonio Núñez. He was succeeded as president on 22 March 2017 by Fidel Espinoza.

== Early life and education ==
Andrade was born on June 2, 1953, in Santiago. He is the son of Osvaldo Andrade Andrade and Alberta del Carmen Lara Acevedo. He is married and the father of four children.

He completed his primary and secondary education at Escuela Domingo Matte Mesías in Puente Alto. He later enrolled in the Faculty of Law at the Pontifical Catholic University of Chile.

Following the coup d'état of 11 September 1973, he was expelled from the university due to his political affiliation, although he was later reinstated. In 1987, he obtained a Licentiate degree in Law from the University of Salamanca, Spain. He was admitted to the Chilean Bar on June 19, 1989.

Professionally, Andrade developed a career as a labor lawyer, specializing in decentralization and local development issues. Between 1994 and 2000, he served as director of the Empresa de Servicios Sanitarios de la Región de Atacama (EMSSAT). Subsequently, between 2000 and 2004, he was president of ESSAT in the Tarapacá Region.

== Political career ==
Since 1968, Andrade has been a member of the Socialist Party of Chile. He was also a leader within the Socialist Youth.

After the 1973 coup and until late 1978, he was detained in several facilities across the country, including Investigaciones de Puente Alto, San Bernardo Prison, the Central Headquarters of Investigations, Estadio Chile, the Santiago Penitentiary, Villa Grimaldi, Cuatro Álamos, and Puchuncaví. During this period, he also lived clandestinely under the political alias "Marcelo."

During the military government, while a university student, he worked with the Pastoral Obrera of Puente Alto, advising trade unions affiliated with the Confederation of Bakers and the Compañía Manufacturera de Papeles y Cartones (CMPC).

Between 1991 and 2005, he served as Municipal Secretary of the Municipality of El Bosque.

In 2000, during the presidential campaign of Ricardo Lagos, he chaired the regional and local development commission of the government program of the Concertación. In 2001, he ran for deputy for District No. 27 of the Santiago Metropolitan Region, corresponding to the communes of El Bosque, La Cisterna, and San Ramón, but was not elected.

In 2005, he served as general campaign representative during the presidential campaign of Michelle Bachelet. That same year and in 2006, he was vice president of the Socialist Party.

On 11 March 2006, he assumed office as Minister of Labor and Social Welfare during the presidency of Michelle Bachelet. During his tenure, 53 laws related to labor matters were enacted, including the Pension Reform, the New Labor Justice system, the Subcontracting Law, the holiday entitlement for domestic workers, and the right to breastfeeding for working women, among others. In December 2008, he resigned from his position to run for a seat in Congress.

Between August 2010 and May 2015, he served as president of the Socialist Party of Chile.

In November 2017, he ran again for the Chamber of Deputies, representing the Party for Democracy in the 12th District of the Santiago Metropolitan Region within the coalition La Fuerza de la Mayoría, but was not elected.
