= Gabriel Aldoney =

Chilean politician (born 1948)

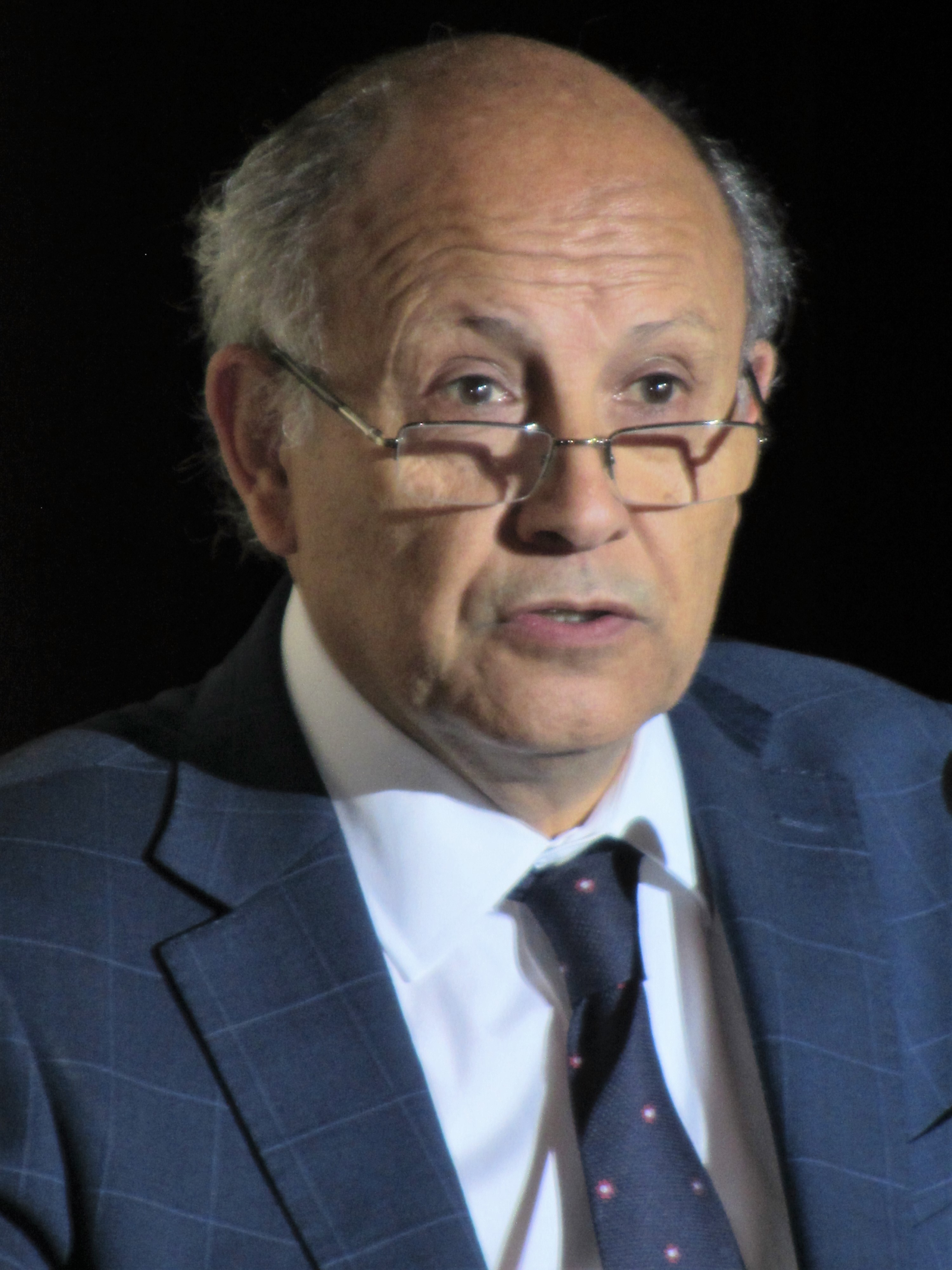

Intendant of the Valparaíso Region
- In office 17 August 2015 – 11 March 2018
- President: Michelle Bachelet
- Preceded by: Ricardo Bravo Oliva
- Succeeded by: Jorge Martínez Durán
- In office 19 May 1997 – 11 March 2000
- President: Eduardo Frei Ruiz-Tagle
- Preceded by: Hardy Knittel
- Succeeded by: Josefina Bilbao

Personal details
- Born: 26 February 1948 (age 78) Limache, Chile
- Party: Socialist Party
- Education: Pontifical Catholic University of Valparaíso (BA); Polytechnic University of Madrid (MA)
- Profession: Engineer

Gabriel Alejandro Aldoney Vargas is a Chilean engineer and politician who served twice as Intendant of the Valparaíso Region.

== Biography ==
Aldoney studied mechanical engineering at the Pontifical Catholic University of Valparaíso and later he did a MA in business administration at the Polytechnic University of Madrid.

Aldoney has served as an independent consultant in transportation systems. He was head of planning projects for the aircraft dispatch at Frankfurt Airport, advisor to the Ministry of Transport and Telecommunications, planning director of the Ministry of Public Works and national director of the Chilean Port Company.

=== Politics ===
From 1997 to 2000, he held the position of intendant of Valparaíso after being appointed by the president Eduardo Frei Ruiz-Tagle. In 2015, he was appointed again in that position by Michelle Bachelet, who decided it after Ricardo Bravo Oliva's resignation.
