= Raúl Celis Montt =

Chilean constituent

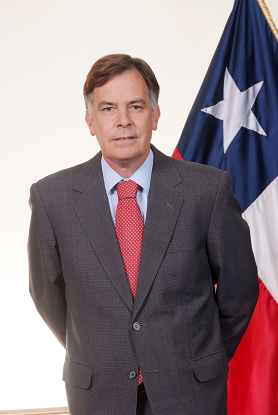
- Celis in 2010 as Indentant of Valparaíso Region

Member of the Constitutional Convention
- In office 4 July 2021 – 4 July 2022
- Constituency: 7th District

Intendant of the Valparaíso Region
- In office 11 March 2010 – 11 March 2014
- President: Sebastián Piñera
- Preceded by: Iván de la Maza
- Succeeded by: Ricardo Bravo Oliva

Personal details
- Born: 5 September 1962 (age 64) Vina del Mar, Chile
- Party: Renovación Nacional
- Parent: Raúl Celis Cornejo
- Relatives: Andrés Celis (brother)
- Education: University of Valparaíso (LL.B)
- Occupation: Politician
- Profession: Lawyer

Raúl Eduardo Celis Montt (born 5 September 1962) is a Chilean lawyer who is member of the Chilean Constitutional Convention.

Before being constituent, he was linked to the business world. In 2010, he was appointed by the president Sebastián Piñera as intendant of the Valparaíso Region.

== Early life ==
He is the son of Raúl Celis Cornejo, who was the last Valparaíso Region intendant appointed by Augusto Pinochet's dictatorship. Similarly, he is the brother of deputy Andrés Celis Montt.

Celis Montt attended Saint Dominic School and The Mackay School in Vina del Mar. Later, he entered the Valparaíso campus of the University of Chile (current University of Valparaíso or «UV»), where he obtained his Bachelor of Arts in laws. Years later he was Dean of the UV Law School.

Since 1988 he has been a lawyer and comptroller at the University of Playa Ancha. In addition, he is a member of the Editorial Board of El Mercurio de Valparaíso, vice president of the Valparaíso Bar Association and arbitrator judge of the Mediation and Arbitration Center of the Valparaíso Chamber of Commerce.

== Political career ==
In 1984, Celis Montt began his career joining the National Union Movement, in which he was vice president of the youth branch. Later, he was a founding member of Renovación Nacional (RN). In that party he has been National Councilor and president of the Viña del Mar-Concón communal section.

In 2001, his party presented him as a candidate for the 14th District (Vina and Concón), but before the election Celis Montt decided to withdraw his candidacy.

On 11 March 2010, he was appointed by Sebastián Piñera as intendant of the Valparaíso Region. He remained in office until the end of Piñera's presidency on 11 March 2014.

In January 2021, he ran as a candidate representing to Vamos por Chile for a seat the Chilean Constitutional Convention. On 18 May 2021, he was elected with 4,14% of the votes.
