= Josefina Bilbao =

Chilean politician (born 1933)

Intendant of the Valparaíso Region
- In office 13 March 2000 – 29 December 2000
- President: Ricardo Lagos
- Preceded by: Gabriel Aldoney
- Succeeded by: Raúl Allard Neumann

Head Ministry of the National Women's Service
- In office 10 March 1994 – 29 March 2000
- President: Eduardo Frei Ruiz-Tagle
- Preceded by: Soledad Alvear
- Succeeded by: Adriana Delpiano

Personal details
- Born: 9 March 1933 (age 93) Valparaíso, Chile
- Party: Close to the Christian Democratic Party
- Spouse: Jorge Guzmán Iturra
- Children: Six
- Parent(s): Eustaquio Bilabo; Pilar Mendezona
- Education: Pontifical Catholic University of Chile (BA)
- Profession: Teacher

María Josefina Bilbao Mendezona is a Chilean engineer and politician who served twice as Intendant of the Valparaíso Region.

== Family and studies ==
She was born in Valparaíso, but her upbringing took place in Viña del Mar, studying at the English Nuns. Then, Josefina settled in Santiago when she was 25. At the moment, she was newly married to the architect and businessman, Jorge Guzmán Iturra, with whom she had six children.

Her father was Eustaquio Bilbao Zumarraga, a Basque immigrant with a strong character, very liberal. By its part, her mother was Pilar Antonia Mendezona Lecanda. Josefina Bilbao is the fourth of five siblings.

She studied catechetical pedagogy at the Catechetical Home dependent on the Pontifical Catholic University of Chile (PUC). She worked as a catechism teacher and later joined Catholic action youth movements in a very committed way.

She later studied family orientation at the Carlos Casanueva Institute, an entity in which she worked as a teacher and director.

== Career ==
In the early Pinochet dictatorship (1973−1990), Bilbao was part of the Justice and Peace Commission of the National Episcopate.

During Patricio Aylwin's government (1990−1994), she was part of the Diagnostic Commission on the Chilean Family as president, taking her first steps in the world of politics.

In 1994, President Eduardo Frei Ruiz-Tagle appointed her Minister Director of the National Women's Service, a position in which she remained until March 2000, becoming the only person in the cabinet to accompany the President throughout his term. In that role, she represented the Chilean government at the 1995 World Conference on Women held in Beijing, China.

Bilbao was independent, although close to the Christian Democratic Party. Then, she held the position of mayor of the Valparaíso Region during Ricardo Lagos' government, who appointed her. Later, she was president of the National Commission on Sexual Education.

She has served as a member of the Cinematographic Qualifying Council and as president of the Mi Casa Foundation board of directors, in addition to belonging to different directories linked to the world of education.
