= Jorge Schaulsohn =

Chilean politician (born 1952)

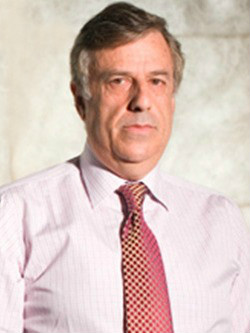

President of the Chamber of Deputies
- In office 11 March 1994 – 3 November 1994
- Preceded by: Jorge Molina Valdivieso
- Succeeded by: Vicente Sota

Member of the Chamber of Deputies
- In office 11 March 1990 – 11 March 1998

Personal details
- Born: 22 December 1952 (age 73) Santiago, Chile
- Party: Radical Party (1970–1987); Party for Democracy (1987–2006)
- Education: University of Chile
- Occupation: Politician
- Profession: Law graduate

Jorge Jaime Schaulsohn Brodsky (born 22 December 1952) is a Chilean politician who was President of the Chamber of Deputies of Chile and as a member of the Chamber of Deputies, representing the former District 22 of Santiago.

== Biography ==
He was born in Santiago on 22 December 1952, the son of Jacobo Schaulsohn Numhauser and Catalina Brodsky Berstein.

He married Patricia Frenz and they have two children.

=== Professional career ===
He completed his secondary education at the Liceo José Victorino Lastarria, Santiago.

In 1973, he traveled to the United States to attend college and obtain a Master’s degree in International Affairs. He later enrolled at the New York University School of Law, where he was elected student representative to the Superior Council composed of professors and students. He obtained a law degree in the United States and was admitted to the New York State Bar Association. He subsequently joined the Inter-American Bar Association.

He returned to Chile in 1980 and enrolled at the University of Chile Faculty of Law, where he earned a degree in Legal and Social Sciences. He was admitted as a lawyer before the Supreme Court of Chile on 30 March 1987.

== Political career ==
He began his political activities as president of the student center of the Liceo José Victorino Lastarria, as member of the executive board of the Federación de Estudiantes Secundarios (FESES) in 1969, and as president of the Radical Youth. In 1970, he was elected member of the National Executive Committee of the Radical Party of Chile. He later served as leader of the Assembly and president of the professionals and technicians branch of that party, and in 1987 rejoined its National Executive Committee.

In 1987, he participated in the founding of the Party for Democracy (PPD), serving as its Secretary-General (1987–1990) and later as its President (1994–1997).

In the 1989 parliamentary elections, he was elected Deputy for District No. 22, Santiago, Santiago Metropolitan Region, obtaining 42,022 votes (27.63% of valid votes). In December 1993, he was re-elected with the highest majority in the same district, obtaining 50,386 votes (37.51% of valid votes).

In the 2004 municipal election, he ran for Mayor of Santiago representing the PPD, but was not elected.

In December 2006, the Supreme Tribunal of the PPD decreed his expulsion from the party.

In May 2007, together with Senator Fernando Flores and Deputy Esteban Valenzuela, he founded the movement ChilePrimero, which later became a political party, where he served as Secretary-General. In 2009, he supported the presidential candidacy of Sebastián Piñera.

In 2013, he resigned from ChilePrimero.
