= Jorge Martínez Durán =

Chilean politician

Jorge Martínez
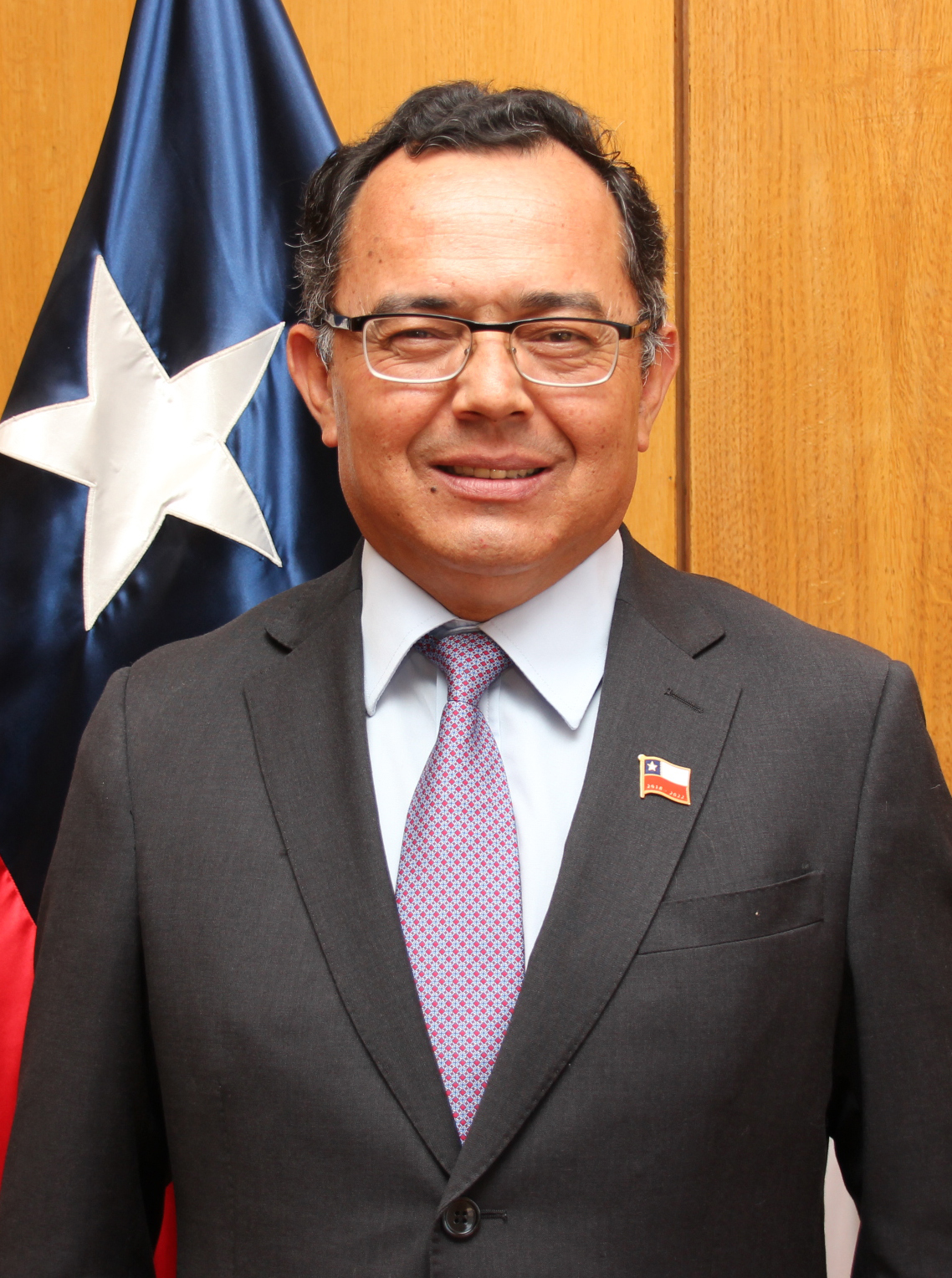
- Martínez in 2018

Presidential delegate of the Valparaíso Region
- In office 14 July 2021 – 11 March 2022
- President: Sebastián Piñera
- Preceded by: Office established
- Succeeded by: Sofía González

Intendant of the Valparaíso Region
- In office 11 March 2018 – 14 July 2021
- President: Sebastián Piñera
- Preceded by: Gabriel Aldoney
- Succeeded by: Abolition of the office

Personal details
- Born: 19 November 1962 (age 63) Santiago, Chile
- Party: National Renewal
- Education: University of Valparaíso (BA); Sapienza University of Rome (MA)
- Profession: Lawyer

Jorge Antonio Martínez Durán (born 19 November 1962) is a Chilean lawyer and politician who served as intendant of the Valparaíso Region.

Martínez has been a professor of Roman law at various Chilean universities, such as the Pontifical Catholic University of Valparaíso or the Universidad de Los Andes. Similarly, in 2013, he was a high-rank consultant in the Minister of Education.

In November 2019, his work as Intendant was heavily criticized by the progressivist media and politicians during the 2019 Chilean protests –Estallido Social (or «Social Outbreak»)–. Similarly, the leftist parliamentary, Diego Ibáñez (from Social Convergence), tried to organize an impeachment against him.

== Biography ==
In the 2010s, he served as regional director of Duoc UC. In the same decade, he also was president and director of the Regional Chamber of Commerce and Production of Valparaíso. Similarly, he was part of a strategic program of the Corfo in Valparaíso.

On 20 January 2016, he was appointed vice-rector of the Viña del Mar campus of the Andrés Bello National University.

=== Political career ===
From 1990 to 1994, Martínez was the legislative coordinator of the Independent Democratic Union (UDI) caucus in Congress. Since that epoch, Jorge is a member of National Renewal (RN).

In 2018, he was appointed by President Sebastián Piñera as Intendant of the Valparaíso Region, a position he held until 13 July 2021. Nevertheless, he was ratified by Piñera as Regional Presidential Delegate.

== Personal life ==
He is married to Carolina Arroyo Aparicio, with whom they have three children. One of them is a councilor of the city of Viña del Mar: Jorge Martínez Arroyo.
