= Roberto Parada (actor) =

Chilean actor, theater director and teacher

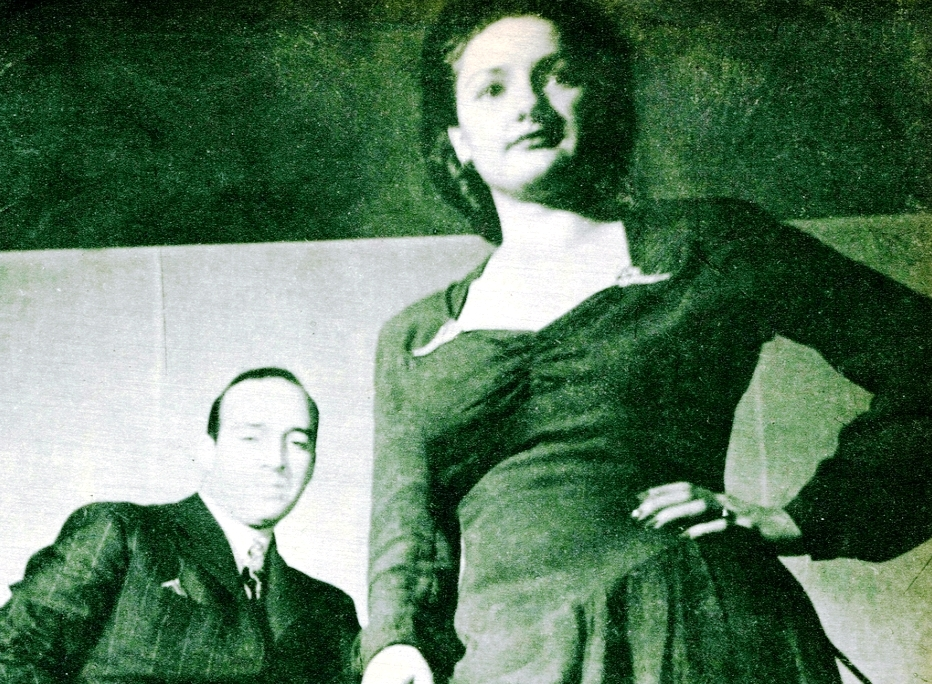
Roberto Parada with his wife, actress and politician María Maluenda

Roberto Parada (September 15, 1909, Concepción, Chile – November 20, 1986, Moscow, USSR) was a Chilean actor, theater director and teacher with a long career of more than 50 years on the stage, and also was a standout militant communist. Married to the actress and deputy of the Communist Party of Chile (1965-1969) and the Party for Democracy (1990-1994), María Maluenda. They had two children, Maria Soledad and the sociologist Jose Manuel, who while working for the Vicariate of Solidarity, assassinated by agents of the DICOMCAR (Directorate of Communications of Carabineros), repressive organ of the dictatorship of Augusto Pinochet.

He also played the role of Pablo Neruda in the film Burning Patience, literary work of Antonio Skármeta, who also participated in the making of the film as a director and screenwriter. The film was shot in 1983, and also featured the performances of Óscar Castro Ramírez and Marcela Osorio.

While he was working on the work Primavera with a broken corner, adaptation of the homonymous work of Mario Benedetti, his son, José Manuel, was kidnapped and later murdered in the so-called "Caso Degollados", together with Manuel Guerrero (leader of the AGECH - Association of Teachers of Chile) and Santiago Nattino. José Manuel and Manuel Guerrero were kidnapped at the doors of the Latin American Integration College, on the morning of March 29, 1985. The next day, on the road to Quilicura, both found beheaded with Santiago Nattino, who had been kidnapped on March, 28. Four months later, judge José Canovas Robles established that an intelligence operative group of the Carabineros had executed the kidnappings, torture and subsequent assassination of the communist leaders.

In May 1986, he suffered a thrombosis. The political persecution led him to leave the country with his wife, heading to Buenos Aires and then to Moscow, where he died on November 20, 1986.
