= Vicente Sota =

Chilean politician (1924–2017)

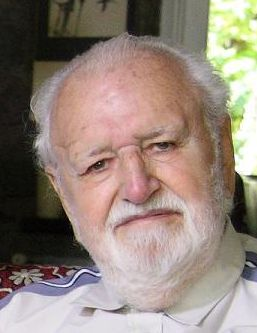

President of the Chamber of Deputies of Chile
- In office 3 November 1994 – 14 March 1995
- Preceded by: Jorge Schaulsohn
- Succeeded by: Jaime Estévez

Member of the Chamber of Deputies
- In office 11 March 1990 – 11 March 1998
- Succeeded by: Jaime Jiménez Villavicencio
- Constituency: District 31
- In office 15 May 1965 – 15 May 1969
- Constituency: Department 7, district 1

Personal details
- Born: 24 April 1924 Talca
- Died: 16 August 2017 (aged 93)
- Party: Party for Democracy (since 1987)
- Other political affiliations: National Falange (1940–57); Christian Democratic Party (1957–69); Popular Unitary Action Movement (1969–73)
- Education: Pontifical Catholic University of Chile
- Occupation: Politician
- Profession: Industrial engineer

Vicente Agustín Sota Barros (24 April 1924 – 16 August 2017) was a Chilean politician. He served two stints in the Chamber of Deputies, first from 1965 to 1969 and again from 1990 to 1998.

Born in Talca on 28 April 1924, he earned a degree in industrial engineering from Pontifical Catholic University of Chile. Sota joined the National Falange in 1940, and upon the party's dissolution in 1957, became a member of the Christian Democratic Party. While affiliated with the PDC, Sota served in the Chamber of Deputies as a representative of central Santiago between 1965 and 1969. Shortly after the end of his first term in office, Sota cofounded the Popular Unitary Action Movement.

Sota left Chile for France after the 1973 Chilean coup d'état, where he spent thirteen years until returning to Chile in March 1986. The next year, Sota co-founded the Party for Democracy.

He won two more parliamentary elections after joining the PPD, in 1989 and 1993, representing district 31, which covered portions of Santiago from 1990 to 1998. Between November 1994 and March 1995, Sota served as President of the Chamber of Deputies of Chile.

== Biography ==
He was born in Talca on 28 April 1924, the son of Ernesto Sota Álvarez and Teresa Barros. His father, a lawyer by training, worked at the court of that city and later, during the first government of Carlos Ibáñez del Campo, lived for a time in the countryside near San Fernando and subsequently in Santiago.

He married psychologist Carmen Gloria Aguayo Irribarra, who was appointed Minister of the Family by President Salvador Allende but was unable to assume office due to the 11 September 1973 coup. They had seven children.

=== Professional career ===
He studied at the Colegio San Ignacio in Santiago, where he was a scholarship student through his sixth year of humanities and met Alberto Hurtado, who was his religion teacher and principal inspiration for his social-Christian vocation. He later entered the School of Engineering of the Pontifical Catholic University of Chile, qualifying as a chemical engineer and completing his professional practice at Codelco’s El Teniente mine in Rancagua.

Professionally, he worked in the private metallurgical industry between 1950 and 1955 at the Oficina “Victoria” of the Compañía Salitrera Tarapacá in Antofagasta and at Fundación Libertad S.A. During this period, he founded the Servicio de Cooperación Técnica Industrial to promote technical activity in nitrate mining.

In 1956, he received a scholarship from the Institute of Inter-American Affairs that enabled him to pursue postgraduate studies at Cornell University in New York, United States. He also worked at INACAP and was appointed Director of Industrial Relations at Vestex.

After completing his parliamentary work, he served as manager of the Construction Industry of the Corporación de Fomento de la Producción (CORFO) in 1970 and 1973. He founded and organized the National Cement Industry, including Cemento Melón and Polpaico, and was also responsible for the "Estanco Automotriz". During this period, he joined the Center of Chemical Engineers of the Pontifical Catholic University of Chile.

Following the 11 September 1973 coup, he went into exile in France, where he lived for thirteen years. He worked as subdirector of marketing at the Société des Ciments Lafarge.
