= Jaime Bravo Oliva =

Chilean politician

Ambassador of Chile to Honduras
- In office 15 July 2014 – 14 July 2018
- Appointed by: Michelle Bachelet
- President: Michelle Bachelet (2014−2018); Sebastián Piñera (until April 2018)
- Preceded by: Rodrigo Pérez Manríquez
- Succeeded by: Enrique Barriga

Councilmen of El Tabo
- In office 6 December 2004 – 6 December 2008

Personal details
- Born: Valparaíso, Chile
- Party: Socialist Party
- Relatives: Ricardo (brother)
- Education: Pontifical Catholic University of Valparaíso (BA); University of Chile (MA)
- Profession: Civil engineer

Jaime Bravo Oliva is a Chilean engineer and politician who served as Ambassador of Chile to Honduras. Bravo has vast experience in the energy sector and has participated in the definition and formulation of the main regulations within Chile.

In the international arena, he has been a member of the national negotiating delegations to the United Nations Framework Convention on Climate Change. Similarly, Bravo integrated the Steering Committee in charge of the Joint Implementation of the Kyoto Protocol, on behalf of Latin America and Caribbean.

== Early life ==
A native of the Valparaíso Region, he is the brother of Ricardo Bravo Oliva.

Jaime did his BA in business administration at the Pontifical Catholic University of Valparaíso. Similarly, he realized a Master's Degree in Engineering Sciences at the University of Chile.

== Professional career ==
In the public sector, for more than a decade he was part of the National Energy Commission (CNE). He also served in the Ministry of Energy, specifically as Head of the Sustainable Development Division. Similarly, he and Juan José Rivas were also part of the advisory team of Marcelo Tokman, the first CNE president and the first minister of energy in Chile.

In 2008, during Michelle Bachelet's first government (2006−2014), Bravo and Rivas gained renown in the National Congress for their efforts to speed up initiatives that would allow injecting more megawatts into the Central Interconnected System (SIC).

When he was the CNE's Head of the Environment and Renewables Energies, Bravo Oliva used to meet with Rivas and other experts involved in the review of projects of the Environmental Impact Studies (EIA) on increasing Chile's electricity supply. For that reason, Bravo was nicknamed 'energy fast tracker'.

== Political career ==
In 2004, Jaime Bravo successfully run for a seat as a councilman in El Tabo commune. However, he wasn't reelected in the 2008 municipal elections. On the other hand, Bravo risked not being able to compete in the 2008 elections due to pending litigation with that town's municipality. Although he was finally able to compete, Bravo wasn't reelected.

In 2014, he was appointed by Bachelet as the Ambassador of Chile to Honduras.
