= Patricio Walker =

Chilean politician

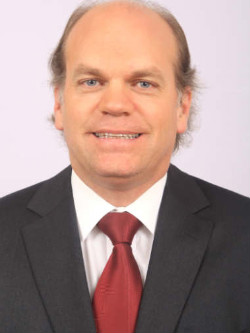
- Walker in 2013

President of the Senate
- In office 11 March 2015 – 15 March 2016
- Preceded by: Isabel Allende
- Succeeded by: Ricardo Lagos Weber

Member of the Senate
- In office 11 March 2010 – 11 March 2018

President of the Chamber of Deputies
- In office March 2007 – March 2008
- Preceded by: Antonio Leal
- Succeeded by: Juan Bustos

Member of the Chamber of Deputies
- In office 1998 – 11 March 2010

Personal details
- Born: 28 April 1969 (age 57) Santiago, Chile
- Party: Christian Democratic Party
- Education: Diego Portales University

Patricio Walker Prieto (born 28 April 1969) is a Chilean politician. He was President of the Senate between 11 March 2015 and 15 March 2016.

A former member of the Christian Democratic Party. He served as a Senator for the 18th Senatorial District, representing the Aysén Region, between 2010 and 2018. He was President of the Senate of Chile from 11 March 2015 to 15 March 2016.

Previously, he was a Member of the Chamber of Deputies for District No. 8 in the Coquimbo Region, serving three consecutive terms between 1998 and 2010. He also served as President of the Chamber of Deputies of Chile between March 2007 and March 2008.

== Early life and education ==
Walker was born in Santiago on 28 April 1969. He is the son of Ignacio Joaquín Walker Concha and Isabel Margarita Prieto Vial. Among his nine siblings are former senator Ignacio Walker Prieto and senator Matías Walker Prieto. His grandfather was senator Horacio Walker Larraín, and his great-grandfather was senator Joaquín Walker Martínez. He is married to Francisca Ibarra Ovalle and has four children.

Between 1975 and 1983, he completed his primary education at Colegio San Ignacio. He continued his secondary education at the Seminario Menor School, graduating in 1987. In 1988, he entered the School of Law at Diego Portales University and he obtained his degree in 1994. He was admitted to the bar by the Supreme Court of Chile on 16 January 1995.

In 1987, Walker was selected as the representative of Chilean youth at the Third World Youth Meeting held in Argentina, where he delivered the official address before Pope John Paul II.

== Professional career ==
Between 1993 and 1996, Walker worked as a legislative advisor at the Ministry of Housing and Urbanism. In the academic field, he served as a faculty member in the Competitiveness Leadership Program at Georgetown University between 2010 and 2018.

In 2019, he obtained, with highest distinction, a Master of Laws (LL.M.) in Regulatory Law from the Pontifical Catholic University of Chile.

He currently serves as a professor of Environmental Law in the Master’s Program in Regulatory Law (LL.M.) at the Pontifical Catholic University of Chile, as well as in the Master’s Program in Environmental Law at the University for Development. He is also a member of the Superior Governing Council of Diego Portales University, with a term extending until 2030.

Since 2024, Walker has served as a board member of the Amparo y Justicia Foundation.

== Political career ==
In the parliamentary elections of 1997, 2001 and 2005 Walker was elected for the Christian Democratic Party to the Chamber of Deputies for District 8 of the Coquimbo Region. Walker served as fraction leader of the Christian Democratic Party from 2002 to 2003. Between March 2007 and March 2008 Walker was President of the Chamber of Deputies.

In the parliamentary elections of 2009 Walker was elected Senator for the 18th Circunscription of Aysén. He was elected President of the Senate on 11 March 2015. He obtained 23 out of 38 votes and succeeded Isabel Allende.

In July 2015 Walker spoke out against a possible return to compulsory voting in Chile, calling the remedy possibly worse than the problem. Walker travelled to Venezuela for the 2015 parliamentary elections as an observer. He spoke with Lilian Tintori, wife of imprisoned politician Leopoldo López. Walker supported the couple and stated there was no crime and fraudulent evidence.

Walker was succeeded as President of the Senate on 15 March 2016 by Ricardo Lagos Weber. In October 2017, as President of the Senate Commission on Children he argued for raising the monthly subsidies for children. Walker decided not to run in the 2017 Chilean general election and his term in office ended on 18 March 2018.
