= Aldo Cornejo =

Chilean politician

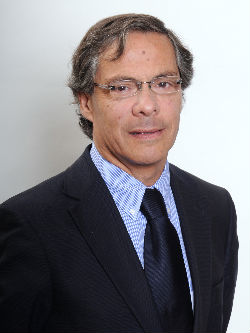

President of the Chamber of Deputies
- In office 11 March 2014 – 17 March 2015
- Preceded by: Edmundo Eluchans
- Succeeded by: Marco Antonio Núñez

Member of the Chamber of Deputies
- In office 11 March 2010 – 11 March 2018
- In office 11 March 1990 – 11 March 2002

Mayor of Valparaíso
- In office 6 December 2004 – 6 December 2008
- Preceded by: Hernán Pinto
- Succeeded by: Jorge Castro Muñoz

Personal details
- Born: 19 April 1955 (age 71) Curicó, Chile
- Party: Christian Democratic Party
- Education: Pontifical Catholic University of Valparaíso

Aldo Vicente Cornejo González (born 19 April 1955) is a Chilean politician who served as a member of the Chamber of Deputies, representing District 13 of the Valparaíso Region and as Mayor of Valparaíso.

He has contributed as a columnist to the newspaper La Estrella of Valparaíso and is a member of the Valparaíso Bar Association.

== Biography ==
He was born in Curicó on 19 April 1955. He is the son of Hernán Cornejo Arriagada and Nelli González Alvear. He was first married to Soledad Surjan and later to Tania Bertoglio Caballero. He is the father of four children.

He completed his secondary education at the San Martín Institute of Curicó. He later entered the Faculty of Law of the Pontifical Catholic University of Valparaíso (PUCV), where he obtained his law degree in 1983.

Professionally, he worked at the Public Prosecutor’s Office of the BHIF Mortgage Bank between 1979 and 1989. He also practiced law independently and taught Civil Law at the Faculty of Law of the PUCV.

== Political career ==
During his school years, he was elected president of the Secondary Students’ Federation of his school. He began his political involvement during his university years, joining the Christian Democratic Party in 1970 at the age of fifteen, and serving as a party leader between 1976 and 1980.

After graduating, he was elected president of the Christian Democratic Professionals’ Association of Valparaíso in 1984 and provincial president in 1985. He later became a member of the Group of 24, dedicated to constitutional studies from its foundation.

During the 1988 national plebiscite campaign, he served as secretary of the No Campaign Command in Valparaíso. That same year, he was elected delegate to his party’s National Council.

In December 2001, he was a candidate for Senator for the V Region of Valparaíso Coast (6th Circumscription) but was not elected.

In June 2002, he assumed the role of political adviser to Minister of Health Osvaldo Artaza, working on the implementation of the AUGE Plan.

In 2004, he was elected Mayor of Valparaíso for the 2004–2008 term. In the 2008 municipal elections, he ran for re-election but was defeated by Jorge Castro Muñoz.
