= José Antonio Viera-Gallo =

Chilean politician

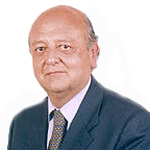

Ambassador of Chile to Argentina
- In office 22 November 2023 – 11 March 2026
- President: Gabriel Boric
- Preceded by: Bárbara Figueroa
- Succeeded by: Gonzalo Uriarte

Minister Secretary-General of the Presidency
- In office 26 March 2007 – 11 March 2010
- President: Michelle Bachelet
- Preceded by: Paulina Veloso
- Succeeded by: Cristián Larroulet

Member of the Senate of Chile
- In office 11 March 1998 – 11 March 2006
- Preceded by: Eugenio Cantuarias
- Succeeded by: Alejandro Navarro
- Constituency: Bío Bío Region

President of the Chamber of Deputies
- In office 11 March 1990 – 21 July 1993
- Preceded by: Luis Pareto (1973)
- Succeeded by: Jorge Molina Valdivieso

Member of the Chamber of Deputies
- In office 11 March 1990 – 11 March 1998
- Succeeded by: Enrique van Rysselberghe Varela
- Constituency: District 44, Concepción

Personal details
- Born: 2 December 1943 (age 82) Santiago
- Occupation: politician

José Antonio Viera-Gallo Quesney (born 2 December 1943) is a Chilean lawyer, academic, and politician of the Socialist Party of Chile. He served as senator for the 12th Senatorial District, Eighth Region Coast, from 1998 to 2006.

He was a member of the Chamber of Deputies for District No. 44 between 1990 and 1998 and served as President of the Chamber of Deputies from 11 March 1990 to 21 July 1993. He was Minister Secretary-General of the Presidency between 26 March 2007 and 10 March 2010 during the first government of President Michelle Bachelet.

He later served as a justice of the Constitutional Court of Chile between 2010 and 2013 and as Ambassador of Chile to Argentina between 2015 and 2018, and again since 22 November 2023 under the administration of President Gabriel Boric.

== Early life and family ==
Viera-Gallo was born in Santiago on 2 December 1943. He is the son of José Viera-Gallo Barahona and Josefina Quesney.

In 1970, he married María Teresa Chadwick Piñera, with whom he has three daughters: María José, María Teresa, and Manuela. He is the brother-in-law of former deputy, former senator, and former minister Andrés Chadwick.

== Education and academic career ==
He completed his primary and secondary education in various schools in Chile and abroad due to his father's diplomatic career, studying in Argentina, the Dominican Republic, Peru, Portugal, and France, and completing his studies at the Colegio del Verbo Divino in Santiago.

He obtained a bachelor's degree in 1960 and later entered the Faculty of Law at the Pontifical Catholic University of Chile, graduating in 1965. He was admitted to the bar before the Supreme Court of Chile on 12 May 1968.

In 1966, after graduating, he completed a two-year postgraduate program in Political Science at the Instituto Latinoamericano de Doctrina y Estudios Sociales (ILADES).

He served as a clerk and later as secretary to justices of the Supreme Court. For three years, he was a professor and researcher at ILADES, a lecturer at the School of Theology, and an assistant professor at the Faculty of Law of the Pontifical Catholic University of Chile. He later taught Political Theory at the same university and continued working at ILADES and at the Centro de Estudios de la Realidad Nacional (CEREN). Representing CEREN, he attended a congress in Bogotá on youth issues in Latin America.

In 1973, he served as Head of Studies of the Pontifical Catholic University of Chile and as an advisor to Rector Fernando Castillo Velasco.

Between 1974 and 1976, during his exile in Italy, he was a visiting professor at the Faculty of Law of the University of Camerino.

Since August 2018, he has taught Parliamentary Law and Constitutional Justice at the Faculty of Law of the Alberto Hurtado University, a course he previously taught at the University of Chile. He is a member of the law firm Rivadeneira, Colombara y Zégers.

== Political career ==
Viera-Gallo began his political activities by joining the Movimiento de Acción Popular Unitaria (MAPU). During the government of President Salvador Allende, he served as Undersecretary of Justice from 30 November 1970 until December 1972.

In the parliamentary elections of 4 March 1973, he ran unsuccessfully for a seat in the Chamber of Deputies representing the Seventh Departmental Grouping of Santiago on the Popular Unity ticket.

=== Exile in Italy ===
Following the military coup of 11 September 1973, he went into exile in Italy in 1974, where he continued his professional activities. In Rome, together with Bernardo Leighton, Esteban Tomic, and Julio Silva Solar, he founded the Documentation Center that published the journal Chile-América, whose final issue appeared on 10 September 1983.

He worked as a consultant for UNESCO, CEPAL, FAO, and the World Council of Churches. He also served as Deputy Secretary-General of the International Documentation Center (IDOC) in Rome and was a member of the governing council of HURIDOCS, the Human Rights Information and Documentation Systems, based in Oslo, Norway.

From 1983, he served as director of the Centro de Estudios Sociales (CESOC), assuming its presidency in 1990. He also served as executive secretary of the Center for Studies on International Cooperation Dos Mundos.

=== Return to Democracy ===
After returning to Chile, he resumed political activities in 1987 as a leader of the Party for Democracy and the Socialist Party of Chile. He actively participated in the campaign for the “No” option in the 5 October 1988 plebiscite.

After the victory of the “No”, he served as a representative of the Concertación coalition on the Technical Commission for Constitutional Reforms and was appointed a member of the Central Committee of the Socialist Party. In December 1989, he ran for the Chamber of Deputies for District No. 44 in Concepción and was elected for the 1990–1994 term. He was re-elected in December 1993 for the 1994–1998 term.

In 1997, he ran for the Senate for the 12th Senatorial District, Eighth Region Coast, representing the Socialist Party, and was elected for the 1998–2006 term. In 2005, he sought re-election but was defeated in the Socialist Party primaries by Deputy Alejandro Navarro.

On 27 March 2007, he was appointed Minister Secretary-General of the Presidency by President Michelle Bachelet, serving until 10 March 2010. On that same date, he was appointed a justice of the Constitutional Court of Chile, serving until 10 March 2013.

Between 2011 and 2015, he served as president of the Chilean-Israeli Institute of Culture. From 2014 to 2015, he was president of Chile Transparente, the national chapter of Transparency International.

On 22 June 2015, he was appointed Ambassador of Chile to Argentina by President Michelle Bachelet, serving until March 2018. He returned to the same post on 22 November 2023 under the administration of President Gabriel Boric.
