= President of the Chamber of Deputies of Chile =

Presiding Officer of the Lower House of the Chilean Congress

- Presidente de la Cámara de Diputadas y Diputados de la República de Chile
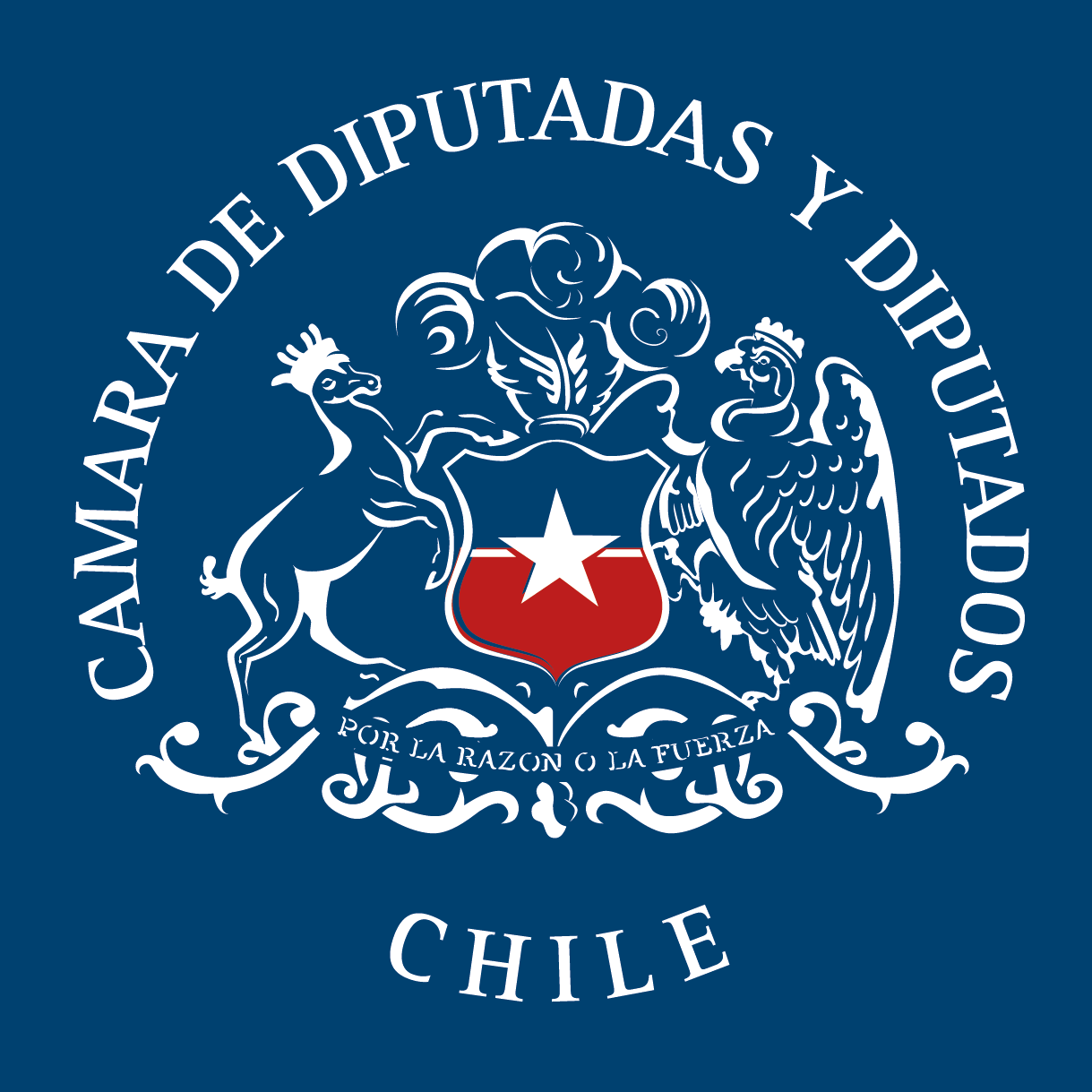
- Emblem of the Chamber of Deputies of Chile

- Flag of Chile

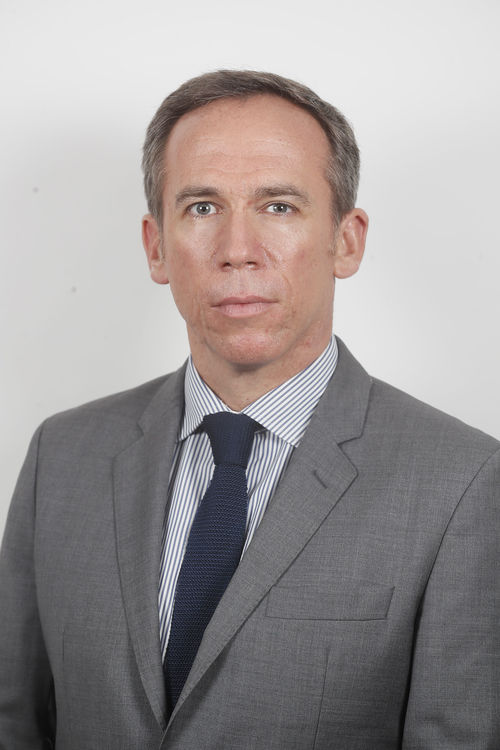
- Incumbent; Jorge Alessandri Vergara since 11 March 2026
- Chamber of Deputies of Chile
- Style: His Excellency; The Honorable
- Status: Presiding officer
- Seat: National Congress of Chile, Valparaíso
- Nominator: Political parties
- Appointer: Chamber of Deputies of Chile
- Term length: One legislative year
- Constituting instrument: Constitution of Chile
- Formation: July 4, 1811; 215 years ago
- First holder: Juan Antonio Ovalle
- Deputy: First Vice President of the Chamber of Deputies; Second Vice President of the Chamber of Deputies
- Salary: US$133,282; CLP$112,198,212
- Website: Official website (in Spanish)

The president of the Chamber of Deputies of Chile (Spanish: Presidente de la Cámara de Diputadas y Diputados de la República de Chile) is the highest authority of the Chamber of Deputies of Chile. The office was established in 1811 by the First National Congress of Chile.

In the presidential line of succession, It is ranked after the ministers of State and the president of the Senate of Chile (Constitution, Art. 29).

The office is currently held by Jorge Alessandri Vergara of the Independent Democratic Union since 11 March 2026.

== Election ==
The directive board of the Chamber of Deputies of Chile is composed of a president, a first vice president and a second vice president. They are elected by an absolute majority in a public ballot.

The president and Vice presidents of the chamber can be reelected.

In case of a resignation from office by the president of the Chamber, if accepted by the Chamber of Deputies, new elections will be held on a congressional session forty five hours after the position was left vacant.

== History ==
=== Patria Vieja (1810–1814) ===
The first president of the Chamber of Deputies of Chile was Juan Antonio Ovalle, a lawyer and landowner who had previously served as procurator of Santiago. He was elected as deputy for Santiago with 343 votes and appointed president of the unicameral First National Congress of Chile. He held office for 16 days before being replaced by Martín Calvo Encalada who had been serving as deputy for Curicó.

On September 4, 1811, revolutionary José Miguel Carrera, with the support of his siblings, led a successful coup d'état with the goal of establishing a more radical government. Joaquín Larraín, a co-conspirator of the coup, was appointed new president of the chamber of deputies as congress went on to pass several reforms.

Relations between José Miguel Carrera and other co-conspirators rapidly worsened which led the Carrera family to carry out a second coup d'état on November 15. Congress continued operating until December 2 when Carrera ordered its dissolution.

Congress was reinstated in 1812, being composed solely by the Senate of Chile which would cease to exist in 1814 following the Chilean defeat at the Battle of Rancagua.

=== Patria Nueva (1817–1823) ===
Supreme Director Bernardo O'Higgins reinstated congress in 1818 as a unicameral legislative body composed by the Senate of Chile. A bicameral system was stablished in 1822 following the creation of a new constitution, the new legislative body was composed of a Senate and a Chamber of Deputies. The bicameral system could not implemented due to the political turmoil in the country following the resignation and self-exile of O'Higgins on January 28, 1823.

A new constitution was drafted in 1823 during the government of Supreme Director Ramón Freire which stablished a unicameral legislative body formed by the Senate of Chile.

=== Chilean Civil War of 1891 ===
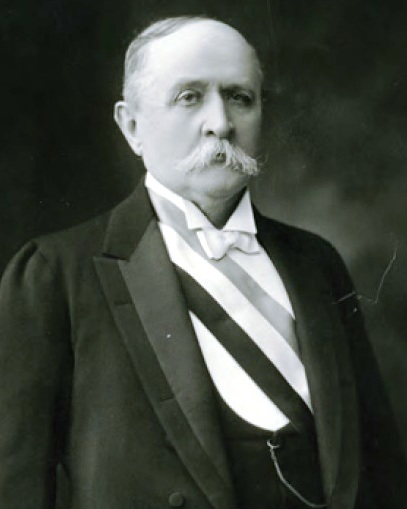
Ramón Barros Luco.

By 1891, several disputes between the executive and legislative branches led to an uprising by Congress with the goal of deposing the liberal government in power.

President of the Chamber Ramón Barros Luco was one of signatories of the act of destitution of President José Manuel Balmaceda, which instigated the Chilean Navy to rebel against the government in support of the Congressist uprising.

Barros Luco was a member of the Revolutionary Junta of Iquique which administered parts of the country that were occupied by the Congressist band during the civil war. Following the congressist victory, Barros Luco participated in another government junta which oversaw parliamentary and municipal elections.

=== Military dictatorship (1973–1990) ===
Congress was dissolved following the 1973 coup d'état that ousted President Salvador Allende. A military junta led by commander-in-chief of the Chilean Army general Augusto Pinochet was stablished.

Luis Pareto served as the last president of the Chamber of Deputies prior to the dissolution of Congress. He was a proponent of the August 23, 1973 accord which accused the Allende administration of seizing power with the goal of establishing a totalitarian government contrary to the democratic values of the Chilean constitution.

=== Presidential Republic (1990–present) ===
Congress was reinstated in March 1990 during the Chilean transition to democracy. Presidential and Parliamentary elections were held in December 1989.

María Maluenda, a human rights advocate and former ambassador to Vietnam, served as provisional president of the Chamber of Deputies during its inaugural session before the election of José Antonio Viera-Gallo.

In 2008, President of the Chamber Juan Bustos died of liver cancer. Following his death, President Michelle Bachelet declared three days of national mourning. His duties were surrogated to First Vice President of the Chamber Guillermo Ceroni who served as provisional president for a week until the election of Francisco Encina.

In November 2019 several deputies requested then-President of the Chamber Iván Flores to resign following his decision to suspend activities on a day during the ongoing 2019–2020 Chilean protests which they deemed as damaging to the public image of Congress. Later that month, Flores' office in Valparaíso was attacked by protestors who threw rocks at the building.

In April 2020 Diego Paulsen became the youngest person to hold the position at 32 years old.

== Role ==
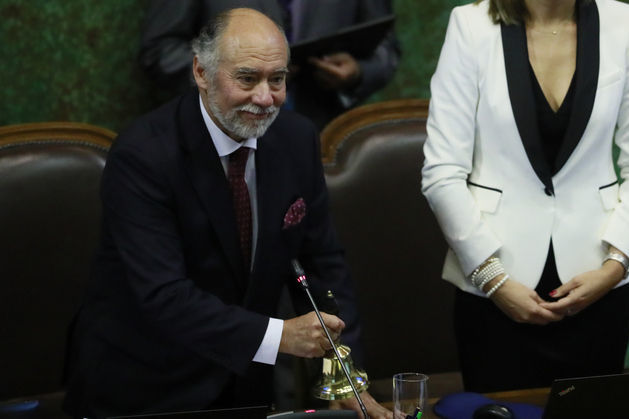
Iván Flores presiding over the Chamber of Deputies in 2019.

The president's principal duty is to preside over the Chamber and maintain order. In case of disarray, the president may request attendees to leave, as well as call for assistance from Carabineros with the purpose of maintaining or re-establishing order in the Chamber.

The president of the Chamber has the capacity to declare the inadmissibility of bills or constitutional reforms that infringe Art. 65 of the Constitution of Chile which grants exclusive capability to the president of the Republic to propose constitutional reforms that alter the current political, administrative or fiscal divisions of the country.

== Form of address ==
The president of the Chamber of Deputies is given the title "His Excellency" which is only used formally or in official documents. The title "The Honorable" is given to all members of the Chamber of Deputies, including its president.

The president should be referred to in third person like the rest of the members of the Chamber.

== Presidents of the Chamber of Deputies of Chile ==
=== Presidential Republic (1990–present) ===
No.	Portrait	Name (Birth–Death)	Term of office		Party
1		María Maluenda (1920–2011)	11 March 1990	11 March 1990	Party for Democracy
2		José Antonio Viera-Gallo (born 1943)	11 March 1990	21 July 1993	Party for Democracy
3		Jorge Molina Valdivieso (born 1932)	21 July 1993	11 March 1994	Party for Democracy
4		Jorge Schaulsohn (born 1952)	11 March 1994	3 November 1994	Party for Democracy
5		Vicente Sota (1924–2017)	3 November 1994	14 March 1995	Party for Democracy
6		Jaime Estévez (born 1946)	14 March 1995	19 November 1996	Socialist Party
7		Gutenberg Martínez (born 1950)	19 November 1996	11 March 1999	Christian Democratic Party
8		Carlos Montes (born 1946)	11 March 1999	22 March 2000	Socialist Party
9		Víctor Barrueto (born 1953)	22 March 2000	3 March 2001	Party for Democracy
10		Luis Pareto (1928–2022)	3 March 2001	11 March 2002	Christian Democratic Party
11		Adriana Muñoz (born 1948)	11 March 2002	13 March 2003	Party for Democracy
12		Isabel Allende Bussi (born 1945)	13 March 2003	16 March 2004	Socialist Party
13		Pablo Lorenzini (1949–2025)	16 March 2004	6 January 2005	Christian Democratic Party
14		Gabriel Ascencio (born 1953)	6 January 2005	11 March 2006	Christian Democratic Party
15		Antonio Leal (1950–2021)	11 March 2006	20 March 2007	Party for Democracy
16		Patricio Walker (born 1969)	20 March 2007	13 March 2008	Christian Democratic Party
17		Juan Bustos (1935–2008)	13 March 2008	7 August 2008	Socialist Party
18		Guillermo Ceroni (born 1946)	7 August 2008	14 August 2008	Party for Democracy
19		Francisco Encina (born 1943)	14 August 2008	18 March 2009	Socialist Party
20		Rodrigo Álvarez (born 1966)	18 March 2009	11 March 2010	Independent Democratic Union
21		Alejandra Sepúlveda (born 1965)	11 March 2010	15 March 2011	Independent Regionalist Party
22		Patricio Melero (born 1956)	15 March 2011	20 March 2012	Independent Democratic Union
23		Nicolás Monckeberg (born 1973)	20 March 2012	3 April 2013	National Renewal
24		Edmundo Eluchans (born 1950)	3 April 2013	11 March 2014	Independent Democratic Union
25		Aldo Cornejo (born 1955)	11 March 2014	17 March 2015	Christian Democratic Party
26		Marco Antonio Núñez (born 1966)	17 March 2015	22 March 2016	Party for Democracy
27		Osvaldo Andrade (born 1953)	22 March 2016	22 March 2017	Socialist Party
28		Fidel Espinoza (born 1970)	22 March 2017	11 March 2018	Socialist Party
29		Maya Fernández (born 1971)	11 March 2018	19 March 2019	Socialist Party
30		Iván Flores (born 1955)	19 March 2019	7 April 2020	Christian Democratic Party
31		Diego Paulsen (born 1987)	7 April 2020	11 March 2022	National Renewal
32		Raúl Soto (born 1987)	11 March 2022	7 November 2022	Party for Democracy
33		Vlado Mirosevic (born 1987)	7 November 2022	24 July 2023	Liberal Party
34		Ricardo Cifuentes (born 1962)	24 July 2023	15 April 2024	Christian Democratic Party
35		Karol Cariola (born 1987)	15 April 2024	24 March 2025	Communist Party of Chile
36		José Miguel Castro (born 1974)	7 April 2025	11 March 2026	National Renewal
37		Jorge Alessandri Vergara (born 1979)	11 March 2026	Incumbent	Independent Democratic Union

== See also ==
- National Congress of Chile
- President of the Senate of Chile
