= Jorge Castro Muñoz =

Chilean politician

Jorge Castro
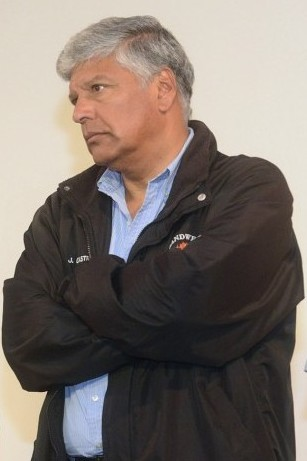
- Castro in 2014

Major of Valparaíso
- In office 6 December 2008 – 18 November 2016
- Preceded by: Aldo Cornejo
- Succeeded by: Marina Huerta Rosales

Counsilman of Valparaíso
- In office 28 September 1992 – 6 December 2016

Personal details
- Born: 20 January 1956 (age 69); Valparaíso, Chile
- Political party: Independent Democratic Union
- Occupation: Politician

Jorge Castro Muñoz (born 20 January 1956) is a Chilean politician who was major of Valparaíso.
