= Juan Bustos Ramírez =

Chilean politician (1935–2008)

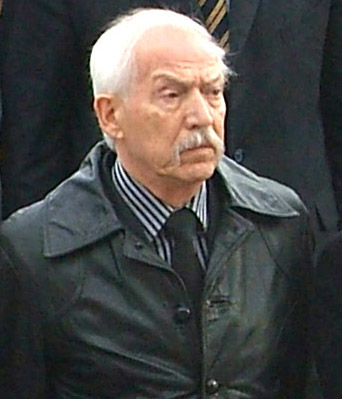
- Juan Bustos at Alejandro Bernales' funeral, 2008

President of the Chamber of Deputies of Chile
- In office March 13, 2008 – August 7, 2008
- Preceded by: Patricio Walker
- Succeeded by: Guillermo Ceroni

Personal details
- Born: December 8, 1935 Santiago, Chile
- Died: August 7, 2008 (aged 72) Santiago, Chile
- Cause of death: Liver cancer
- Party: Socialist Party of Chile
- Spouses: Graciela Eliana Fuentes Valenzuela (m. 1933); Claudia Verónica Chaimovich Guralnik (m. 1947)
- Children: 7
- Parents: Juan Bustos (father); Dorila Ramírez Aristi (mother)
- Occupation: Lawyer, Law professor, Politician
- Known for: Opposition to the Pinochet regime; human rights advocacy; legal representation of Orlando Letelier's family

Juan José Bustos Ramírez (December 8, 1935, Santiago – August 7, 2008) was a Chilean politician, law professor and lawyer. He served as the President of the Chamber of Deputies of Chile from March 13, 2008 until his death on August 7, 2008. He was known as an ardent opponent of the Augusto Pinochet dictatorship and the human rights abuses committed by the regime.

Bustos lived in exile for 14 years while Chile was ruled by the Pinochet military junta from 1973 until 1990. After his return he played a major role in uncovering cases of human rights abuses. Bustos, a top Chilean law professor and human rights lawyer, represented many of the families of people killed by the Pinochet government. During the Pinochet regime, nearly 3,000 people disappeared, while tens of thousands were arrested and tortured. Bustos represented the family of former Chilean Foreign Minister Orlando Letelier, an opponent of Pinochet who was killed by a car bomb in Washington D.C. in 1976. Letelier's assassination was linked to Pinochet military intelligence officials.

Bustos was first elected as a legislator in 1998 as a member of the Socialist Party of Chile. He died before gaining congressional approval for the creation of a new institute to be tasked with investigating the disappearance of thousands of opponents of the Pinochet regime.

Bustos died of liver cancer in Santiago, Chile, on August 7, 2008, at the age of 72. He was survived by his wife and seven children.

Upon learning of Bustos's death, President Michelle Bachelet declared three days of national mourning.
