= Óscar Landerretche =

Chilean politician

Executive Vice-president of the CORFO
- In office 11 March 2003 – 17 March 2006
- Appointed by: Ricardo Lagos
- President: Ricardo Lagos (2003−2006); Michelle Bachelet (2006−2010)
- Preceded by: Gonzalo Rivas
- Succeeded by: Carlos Álvarez

Minister of the National Commission of Energy
- In office 24 November 1998 – 11 March 2000
- President: Eduardo Frei Ruíz-Tagle
- Preceded by: Jorge Leiva Lavalle
- Succeeded by: José De Gregorio

Undersecretary of Economy
- In office 1997 – 24 November 1998
- President: Eduardo Frei Ruíz-Tagle
- Preceded by: Ángel Maulén
- Succeeded by: Luis Sánchez Castellón

Personal details
- Born: 18 October 1949 (age 76) Santiago, Chile
- Party: Socialist Party
- Spouse: Trini Moreno
- Children: Óscar Landerretche Moreno
- Education: University of Chile (BA); University of Los Andes, Colombia (MA); Oxford University (Ph.D.)
- Occupation: Politician
- Profession: Economist

Óscar Alfredo Landerretche Gacitúa (born 18 October 1949) is a Chilean politician who served as minister of State. Similarly, he was president of the board of the Chilean state owned-company Codelco.

== Biography ==
His father was an officer in the Carabineros de Chile, and his mother was a teacher at the Liceo Nº 1 de Niñas in Valparaíso. He is of Basque descent on both his paternal and maternal sides.

He attended the Liceo Eduardo de la Barra in Valparaíso. He earned a degree in business administration and a bachelor's degree in economics from the University of Chile. He later obtained a master's degree in economics from the University of the Andes in Bogotá and a doctorate in political economy from the University of Oxford in England.

He is married to Trini Moreno and is the father of economist Óscar Landerretche Moreno.

== Political career ==
In his youth, he joined the Socialist Party of Chile (PS). In 1971, he received military and intelligence training in Cuba. Following the overthrow of President Salvador Allende in September 1973, he participated in the reorganization of the Socialist Party. The party's first Central Committee plenary meeting after the coup was held in October 1973 at his home in the Villa Aurora neighborhood of Santiago. In the second half of 1974, after taking refuge in the Embassy of Colombia, he went into exile.

While in Colombia, he earned a master's degree in economics from the University of the Andes and served as a professor and researcher there from 1975 to 1976 and again from 1982 to 1990. Between those appointments, he studied in England, where he completed his doctorate in political economy at the University of Oxford. During the second half of the 1980s, he participated in efforts to encourage several guerrilla movements to disarm and enter legal political life, a process that contributed to Colombia's constitutional reform. The Colombian government publicly invited him to serve on the commission of experts that prepared draft proposals for the new constitution, but he declined the appointment because he planned to return to Chile.

After returning to Chile in 1991, he became head of the Productive Development Division at the Ministry of Economy, Executive Secretary of the Interministerial Committee on Productive Development, a state representative on the board of Colbún in 1992, and president of the National Institute for Standardization in 1994.

In 1997, he was appointed Undersecretary of Economy. The following year, he became president of the National Energy Commission (CNE), taking office during the severe energy crisis caused by the 1998–1999 Chilean drought.

He later served as Executive Vice President of the state-owned Production Development Corporation (CORFO), vice chairman of the board of the National Petroleum Company (ENAP), chairman of the board of SERCOTEC, Executive Vice President of the National Mining Company (ENAMI), and a state-appointed member of the board of the Quebrada Blanca mining company.

He has served as an academic at the Graduate School of the Institute of Public Affairs, University of Chile, now the University's Faculty of Government. He has also been director of the institute's graduate school, an MBA lecturer at the Federico Santa María Technical University, a visiting professor in the Faculty of Economics and Business at the University of Talca, and a lecturer at the School of Government and Public Management of the University of Chile.
