= Rodrigo Vergara =

Chilean economist and academic

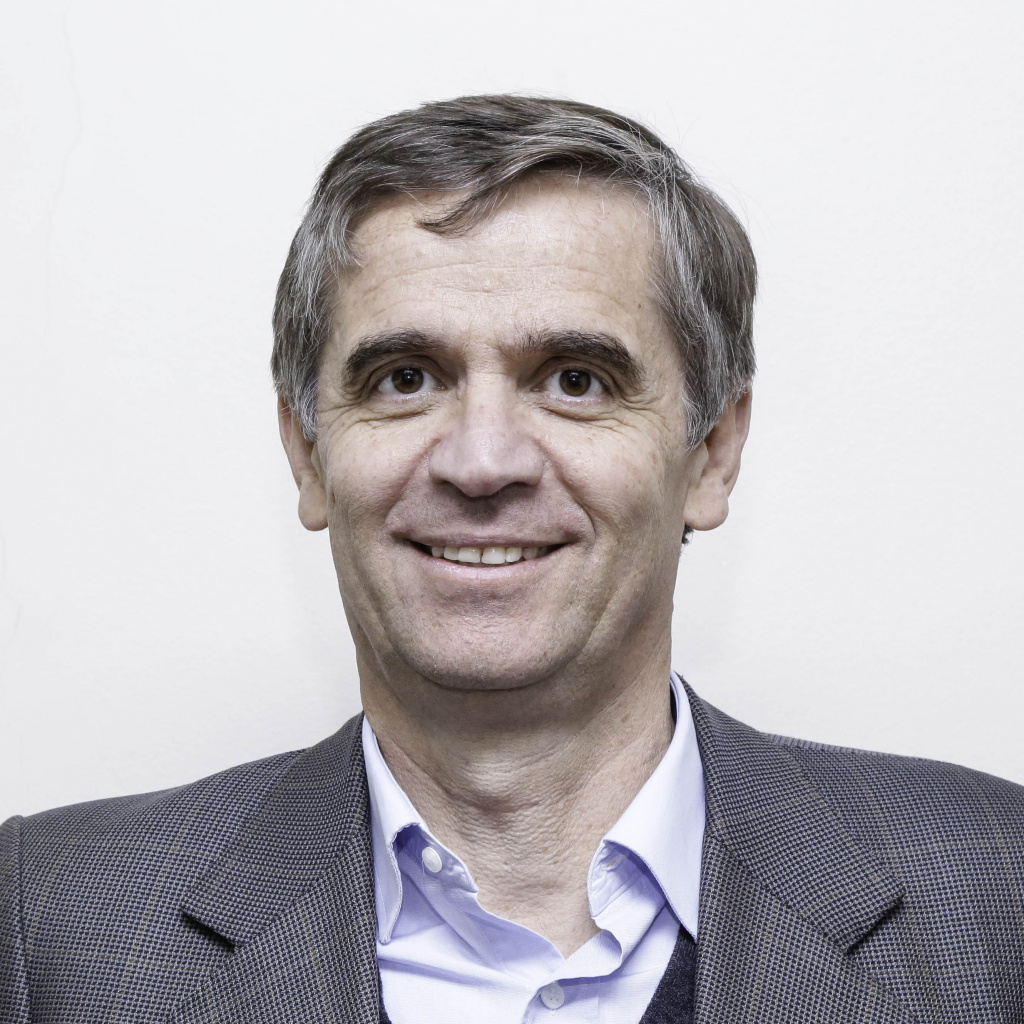
- Rodrigo Vergara in 2018.

President of the Central Bank of Chile
- In office 10 December 2011 – 10 December 2016
- Preceded by: José De Gregorio Rebeco
- Succeeded by: Mario Marcel Cullell

Director of the Central Bank of Chile
- In office 22 December 2009 – 10 December 2016
- Preceded by: Jorge Desormeaux Jiménez
- Succeeded by: Rosanna Costa

Personal details
- Education: Harvard University

Rodrigo Vergara Montes is a Chilean economist and academic. He served as president of the Central Bank of Chile from December 2011 to December 2016. His appointment as president of the Chilean issuing institute, decided by President Sebastián Piñera, to whom he was a close advisor on issues related to overcoming poverty, was the first for this position made by a center- right since the return to democracy in 1990.

== Early life and education ==
He was born from the marriage between Fernando Juan de Dios Mario Vergara Baeza and María Emilia Montes Montes.

He completed his basic and intermediate studies at the Colegio San Ignacio El Bosque, in Santiago, from where he graduated in 1979. Later he studied commercial engineering at the Pontificia Universidad Católica (PUC), between 1980 and 1985, where he won the award for the best graduate of his promotion.

He then traveled to the United States to specialize in macroeconomics, international economics, and public finance. He then pursued a master's degree and doctorate in economics at Harvard University.

== Career ==
His first steps in the world of work were taken in 1985, recently graduated, when he worked as a researcher at the Central Bank of Chile. He worked at the entity until 1987, the year in which he received a scholarship from the issuing entity to pursue his postgraduate studies.

Back in his country, he rejoined the Central Bank as head of the area of financial macroeconomics (1991), a position he held until September 1992, when he was appointed chief economist of the agency, then headed by Roberto Zahler.

In 1995 he chose to join the influential Center for Public Studies (CEP) as coordinator of the macroeconomic area. He held this position until December 2007, when he returned to the Faculty of Economic and Administrative Sciences of the PUC.

He has been a member of the editorial board of the newspaper El Mercurio and director of companies such as Entel, the investment fund Moneda and the construction company Besalco. He has also been a national and international consultant for various central banks and governments of different countries in Latin America, Eastern Europe, Asia, and Africa. Likewise, he has been an advisor to multilateral organizations such as the International Monetary Fund, the World Bank, the Inter-American Development Bank, and United Nations.

=== Counselor and president of the Central Bank ===
Vergara, together with the former managing director of the IMF, Christine Lagard, in December 2009, was part of the team of advisers to Sebastián Piñera, the center-right presidential candidate. His name was proposed by the first government of President Michelle Bachelet to replace Jorge Desormeaux on the Board of the Central Bank. On 22 December, the Senate ratified his nomination by 24 votes in favor and two abstentions.

At the end of 2011, with Piñera in government, he was entrusted with the presidency of the Central Bank, replacing José De Gregorio. His term as president of the Central Bank ended on 10 December 2016, the date from which he also ceased his position as director, despite the fact that he had 3 years remaining since he presented his resignation to President Bachelet on 23 November of that year.

=== Later activities ===
During the second government of Sebastián Piñera in 2018, he was part of the National Comprehensive Development Agreement program.
