= Ignacio Briones =

Chilean economist and politician

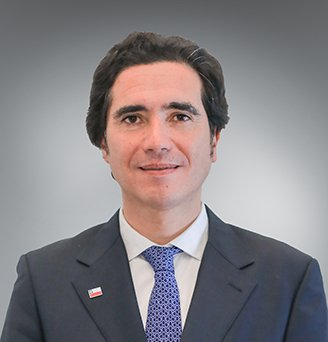

Minister of Finance of Chile
- In office 11 March 2018 – 26 January 2021
- President: Sebastián Piñera
- Preceded by: Felipe Larraín Bascuñán
- Succeeded by: Rodrigo Cerda

Personal details
- Born: 12 December 1972 (age 53) Santiago, Chile
- Party: Evópoli (2016–present)
- Spouse: Francisca Cifuentes
- Education: Pontifical Catholic University of Chile; Sciences Po

Ignacio Briones Rojas (born 12 December 1972) is a Chilean economist, scholar and politician who served as Minister of Finance in the second government of Sebastián Piñera from 2019 until 2021. Prior to this appointment, Ignacio served as Dean of the School of Government of Adolfo Ibáñez University.

== Early life and education ==
Briones is a commercial engineer, a graduate in Economics, Master in Economics and Political Sciences from the Pontificia Universidad Católica de Chile and Doctor in Political Economy from the Paris Institute of Political Studies.

== Early career ==
Briones worked as a professor and researcher at the School of Government and the Business School of the Adolfo Ibáñez University, focusing on areas such as Political Economy and Economic and Financial History. He has also been a consultant for the Inter-American Development Bank, the Ministry of Foreign Affairs and companies such as VTR and the stock brokerage LarrainVial.

== Political career ==
During the first government of Sebastián Piñera, Briones was the coordinator of International Finance of the Ministry of Finance, Director of Public Credit and Director of the Sovereign Funds of the Republic of Chile. In parallel, he was appointed as Executive Director of the Financial Stability Council, representative of Chile to the G20 in 2012 and Chilean Ambassador to the Organisation for Economic Co-operation and Development (OECD) during the period 2013–2014.

On October 28, 2019, Briones was appointed Minister of Finance, replacing Felipe Larraín in the second term of Sebastián Piñera, as part of a cabinet reshuffle after the 2019 protests which Chile experienced due to the perception of social policies promoted by successive governments since the return to democracy in 1990 and social inequality. During his time in office, he spearheaded a $28 billion package of government aid to combat the economic effects of the COVID-19 pandemic in Chile, which included income support for the poor and subsidies for job creation. By mid-2020, opinion polls showed him to be the most popular member of the cabinet after Minister of Health Enrique Paris.

In 2021, Briones stepped down from his government post and was replaced by Rodrigo Cerda.

In 2021, Briones ran to be the presidential candidate of Chile Vamos on the primary election under the wing of Evópoli, a conservative-liberal and centre-right party. He lost to Sebastián Sichel

== Other activities ==
- Inter-American Investment Corporation (IIC), Ex-Officio Member of the Board of Governors (2019–2021)
- Multilateral Investment Guarantee Agency (MIGA), World Bank Group, Ex-Officio Member of the Board of Governors (2019–2021)
- World Bank, Ex-Officio Member of the Board of Governors (2019–2021)

== Trivia ==
Under the pseudonym Eugenio de la Cruz, Briones was a relentless gastronomic critic of the defunct magazine Cosas, for many years. They say that while he was studying in Paris, together with his friend Jorge Ferrando, “they got bitten” by restaurant critics.

=== Football ===
He is supporter of Colo-Colo.
