= Jorge Rodríguez Grossi =

Chilean politician

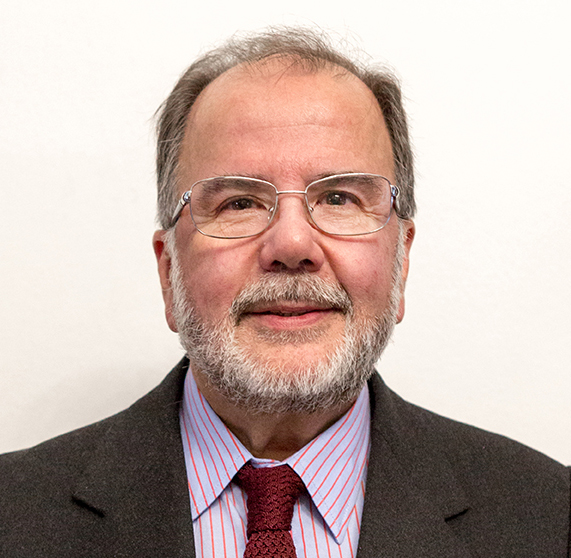

Ministry of Economy, Development and Tourism
- In office 31 August 2017 – 11 March 2018
- President: Michelle Bachelet
- Preceded by: Luis Felipe Céspedes
- Succeeded by: José Ramón Valente
- In office 19 June 2001 – 11 March 2006
- President: Ricardo Lagos
- Preceded by: José De Gregorio
- Succeeded by: Ingrid Antonijevic

Undersecretary of Finance
- In office 7 December 1991 – 11 March 1994
- President: Patricio Aylwin
- Preceded by: Pablo Piñera
- Succeeded by: Manuel Marfán

Minister of Mining
- In office 19 June 2001 – 7 January 2002
- President: Ricardo Lagos
- Preceded by: José De Gregorio
- Succeeded by: Alfonso Dulanto Rencoret

Personal details
- Born: 24 October 1947 (age 78) Santiago, Chile
- Party: Christian Democratic Party
- Spouse: Ana María Cabello
- Children: Two
- Education: University of Chile (B.Sc); University of Boston (MA)
- Profession: Economist

Jorge Horacio Rodríguez Grossi (born 24 October 1947) is a Chilean politician who served as minister.

He held numerous positions related to economic management at various international organizations, including the World Bank, the Inter-American Development Bank (IDB), the Economic Commission for Latin America and the Caribbean (ECLAC), UNICEF, the Latin American and Caribbean Institute for Economic and Social Planning (ILPES), the Regional Employment Program for Latin America and the Caribbean (PREALC), and others, between the 1980s and 1990s.

He also served as a professor at the Alberto Hurtado University in Chile, where he later became dean, and at the University of Chile. He also taught at the Torcuato di Tella Institute in Buenos Aires.

== Professional career ==
During the governments of the Concertación, from 1990 to 2010, he held positions including Undersecretary of Finance and Undersecretary of Regional Development. On 5 February 1994, he was appointed Executive President of the state-owned mining company Codelco, following the resignation of Alejandro Noemi and before Juan Villarzú assumed the position, after the scandal caused by the company's losses in copper futures trading.

He also worked in the private sector as general manager of the power generation company Guacolda. In 2011, he became chairman of the company. In April 2014, he became Chief Executive Officer of Alto Maipo SpA, the company responsible for the 531 MW Alto Maipo Hydroelectric Project planned for the Santiago Metropolitan Region.

=== Chairman of EFE and other positions ===
On 11 October 2007, President Michelle Bachelet appointed him chairman of the board of the Empresa de los Ferrocarriles del Estado, amid a deep crisis at the state-owned transport company following allegations of irregularities in a US$1.1 billion investment programme carried out during the administration of Ricardo Lagos.

He announced his departure effective May 2010, following the inauguration of the centre-right administration of Sebastián Piñera. His departure did not prevent him from accepting appointment as a member of the board of BancoEstado in May 2010. Nevertheless, he continued to describe himself as an opponent of Sebastián Piñera, in line with the position of his political party. In May 2006, he had been appointed a member of the board of BancoEstado. The two previous Concertación administrations had also appointed an opposition representative to the bank's board.

At the end of 2011, he was appointed by the Piñera administration as one of the twelve members of the Presidential Advisory Commission for the Defence of Free Competition.

In September 2015, he was appointed chairman of BancoEstado by the second administration of Michelle Bachelet.

== Political career ==
=== Minister of State ===
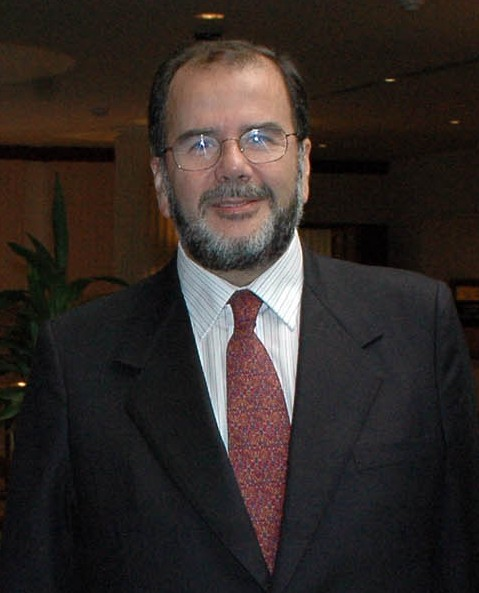
Rodríguez Grossi in 2006, during a visit to Argentina.

In June 2001, he was appointed by President Ricardo Lagos as the combined Minister of Economy, Energy and Mining. He served as Minister of Mining until 2002, when the Ministry of Mining was separated from the other two portfolios.

Although he remained in office until 11 March 2006, when Lagos's presidency ended, his tenure was marked by several difficulties, including a proposed an impeachment against him over the Corfo-Inverlink scandal, which ultimately did not succeed. The case was particularly significant because CORFO fell under the authority of the Ministry of Economy.

Another major challenge during his tenure was the energy crisis caused by the reduction in natural gas exports from Argentina, which raised doubts about Chile's ability to respond to such a situation and to secure alternative sources of energy. This was compounded by rising petroleum prices, forcing the government to use public funds derived from copper revenues to subsidize fuel prices.

On 31 August 2017, he assumed office as Minister of Economy, Development and Tourism during the administration of Michelle Bachelet, following the complete departure of the government's economic team.
