= Mario Marcel =

Chilean economist (born 1959)

Mario Marcel Cullell
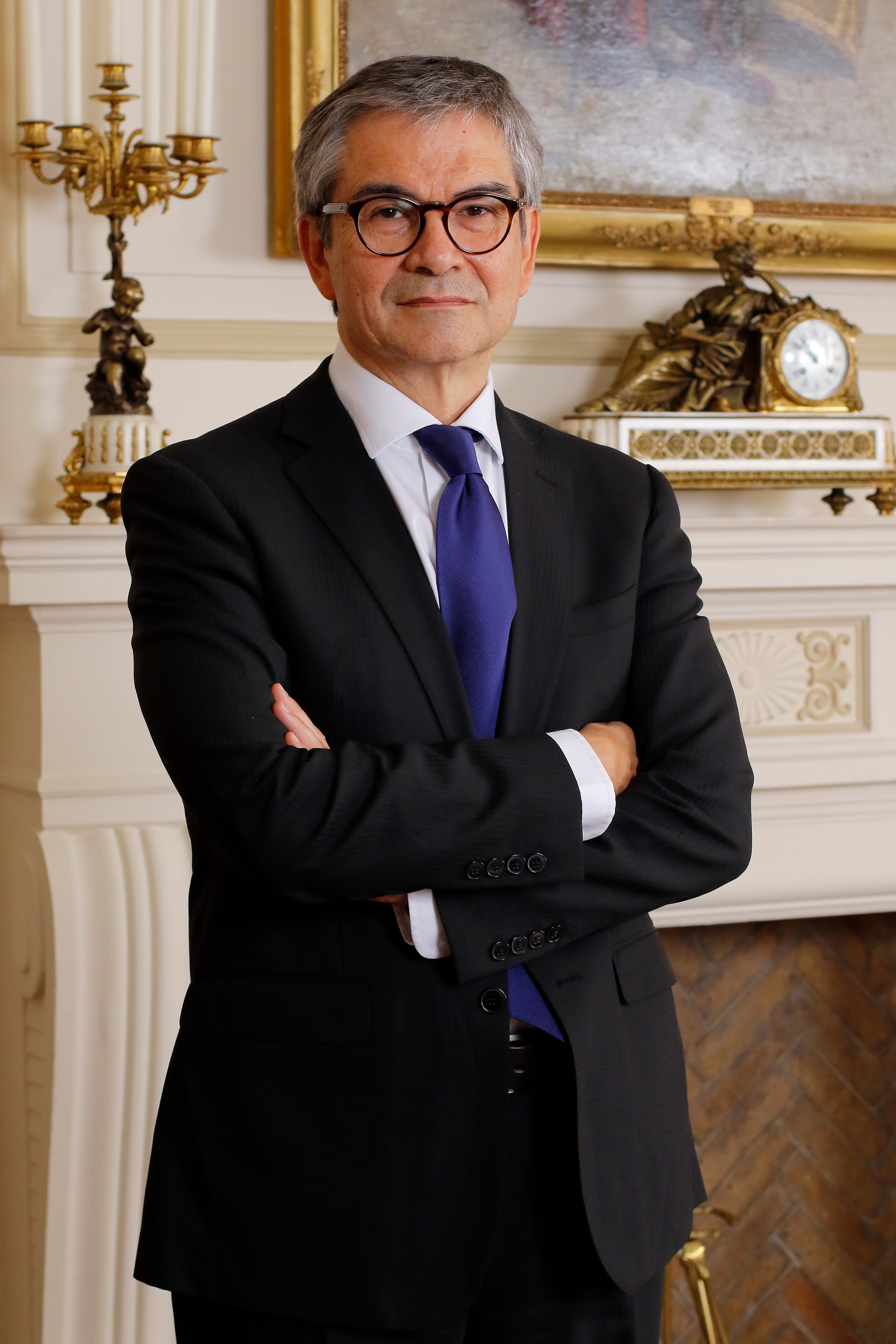

Minister of Finance
- In office 11 March 2022 – 21 August 2025
- President: Gabriel Boric
- Preceded by: Rodrigo Cerda
- Succeeded by: Nicolás Grau

President of the Central Bank of Chile
- In office 11 December 2016 – 27 January 2022
- Preceded by: Rodrigo Vergara
- Succeeded by: Rosanna Costa

Counselor of the Central Bank of Chile
- In office 1 October 2015 – 27 January 2022
- Preceded by: Enrique Marshall Rivera
- Succeeded by: Stephany Griffith-Jones

Director of the Budget Division of Chile
- In office 11 March 2000 – 10 March 2006
- Preceded by: Joaquín Vial Ruiz-Tagle
- Succeeded by: Alberto Arenas de Mesa

Personal details
- Born: Mario Marcel Cullell; 22 October 1959 (age 67) Santiago de Chile, Chile
- Spouse: Pamela Albornoz Castillo
- Children: 4
- Education: Universidad de Chile; University of Cambridge
- Website: Official website

Mario Marcel Cullell (born 22 October 1959, Santiago de Chile) is a Chilean economist who has served as Chile Minister of Finance from 11 March 2022 to 21 August 2025. He previously served as Governor of the Central Bank of Chile. He was named Governor in December 2016 and member of the Bank's Board from October 2015. He has been a close collaborator to the governments of the centre-left Coalition of Parties for Democracy (1990–2010), and for six years held the position of Budget Director, where he played a key role in the design of the structural surplus rule.

== Early years ==
Marcel studied at the Instituto Nacional General José Miguel Carrera high school in Santiago and Business Administration at the University of Chile (1977-1981), where he graduated as the best student of his class. Later on he achieved a MA degree in economics at the University of Cambridge, United Kingdom. He was the first member of his family to achieve a university degree. His mother and grandparents arrived to Chile by ship on 18 September 1937, escaping the Spanish Civil War. His parents had to abandon their study projects in order to work and financially sustain their families. His father set up a small electric appliances enterprise in the early seventies. He joined the Center for Latin American Studies (Cieplan) as a junior researcher in 1979, while still a university student. He then progressed as assistant, associate and finally senior researcher.

== Career ==
=== Administrations of presidents Patricio Aylwin and Eduardo Frei (1990–2000) ===
Upon Patricio Aylwin's arrival at the Presidency of the Republic in March 1990, and Alejandro Foxley at the Ministry of Finance, Mr. Marcel joined the Government as Advisor on macroeconomics and social programs, later assuming the position of Deputy Budget Director. In 1994, with Eduardo Frei Ruiz-Tagle in the Presidency, he was appointed Executive Secretary of the Inter-Ministerial Committee for the Modernization of Public Administration. At the end of 1996, he took office as Interim Director of the Budget Division (Dipres), when the incumbent, José Pablo Arellano —with whom he has a long-lasting friendship— was appointed Minister of Education. Between October and December he led the approval processing of the Budget Law; promoted the first protocol of budgetary agreements between the Government and the Congress; and laid the foundations for the public sector management control system that would be developed in the following years. Between 1997 and 2000, he was executive director for Chile at the Inter-American Development Bank (IDB). In the United States, he strengthened his relationship with Nicolás Eyzaguirre (then at the IMF), with whom he had worked in the early eighties in the Association of Socialist Economists. Here he also approached Michelle Bachelet, who was then attending at Fort Leslie, the Inter-American Defense University. During this period he was chairman of the IDB's Budget Committee and led the formulation of this international organization's first Institutional Strategy.

He served as the deputy director for Public Governance and Territorial Development at the Organisation for Economic Co-operation and Development (OECD). He also previously worked at the Inter-American Development Bank where he was executive director for Chile and Ecuador and Manager of the Institutional Capacity and Finance.

He served as deputy director of Rationalization and Public Function in the Budget Division of the Finance ministry of the Chilean government, Executive Secretary for the Inter-Ministerial Committee for the Modernization of Public Administration, Chair of the General Government's Internal Audit Committee and Chair of the Presidential Advisory Committee on Pension Reform. He was the Budget Director from 2000 to 2006.

=== Administrations of Ricardo Lagos and Michelle Bachelet (2000–2010) ===
In 2000, the incoming President, Ricardo Lagos, appointed him as Budget Director, and Nicolás Eyzaguirre as Minister of Finance. Marcel is recognized as one of the ideologues of the 1% of GDP structural surplus rule, because before assuming, he had conducted a study on the methodology for calculating long-term fiscal indicators. The rule has been applied since 2001 in order to spend what is considered stable income over time, once adjusting by the effects of the business cycle on fiscal income. While in office, he promoted far-reaching reforms in the conduct of fiscal policy; the administration of public assets and liabilities; the budgetary system; and the public management. Despite being a serious candidate to become Minister of Finance under President Michelle Bachelet in January 2006, he was not the nominee. Nevertheless, Ms. Bachelet appointed him to lead the commission that studied changes to the local pension system, one of the main guidelines of her government program as a candidate. The recommendations of the “Marcel Commission” laid the foundations for the Pension Reform approved in 2008. After completing this work, he resumed his private consultancy role. Between 2006 and 2008, he worked as a senior researcher at Cieplan, professor at the University of Chile, director of the firms Transelec and Aguas Metropolitanas, and as international consultant for Mexico, El Salvador and Vietnam.

=== International work and board member of the Central Bank (2008–present) ===
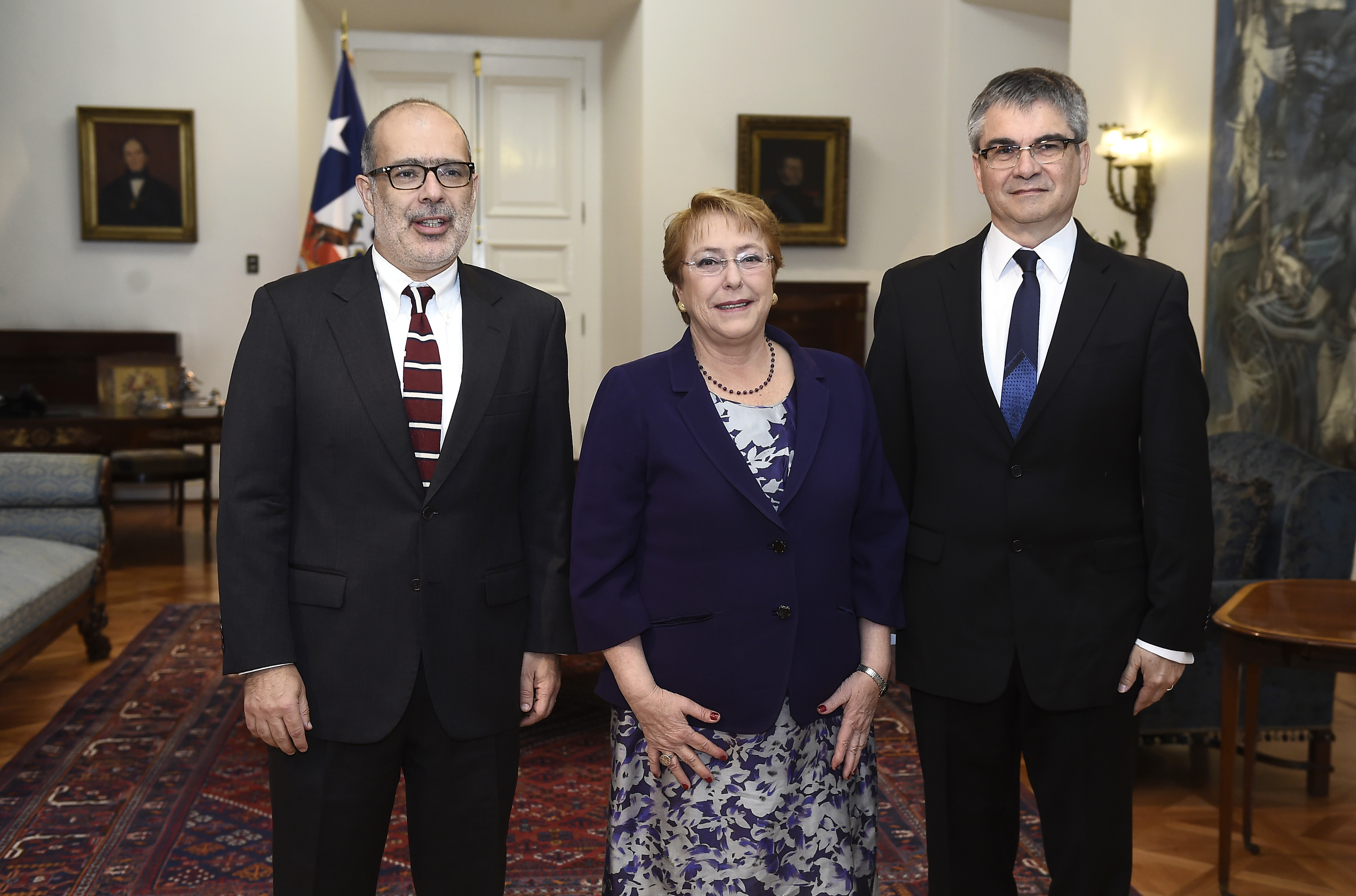
On 25 October 2016, the President of the Republic, Michelle Bachelet, accompanied by the Minister of Finance, Rodrigo Valdés, announced the Marcel as new Governor of the Central Bank. He took office on 10 December.

In 2008, he assumed management of the IDB's Department of Institutional Capacity and Finance in Washington D. C., leading projects that ultimately accounted for more than one third of the IDB's approvals in that period. In early 2011, he moved to Paris, France, to serve as deputy director of Public Governance and Territorial Development of the Organization for Economic Cooperation and Development (OECD). In such capacity, he actively participated in the monitoring fiscal consolidation policies in developed countries and launched the agency's institutional trust agenda. In 2014, he moved to the World Bank as Director of the Global Good Governance Practice, leading a team of more than 900 professionals, with presence in all World Bank country offices.

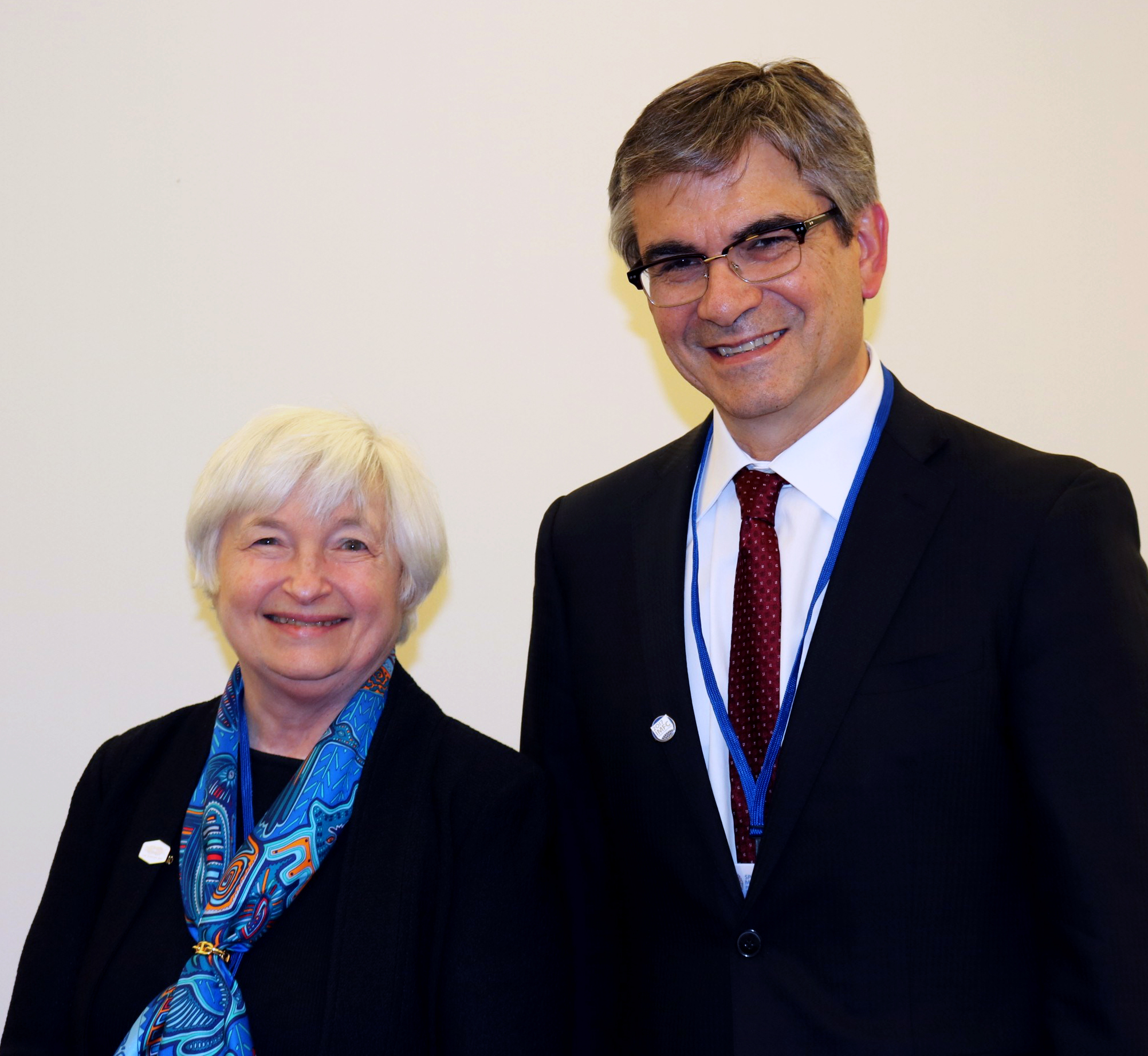
Marcel with Janet Yellen in 2017

On 24 August 2015, he was proposed to the Senate by Ms. Bachelet to replace outgoing Member Enrique Marshall in the Board of the Central Bank of Chile as from one October.19 His nomination was unanimously ratified by the Senate, with 31 votes in favor, and no votes against or abstentions.

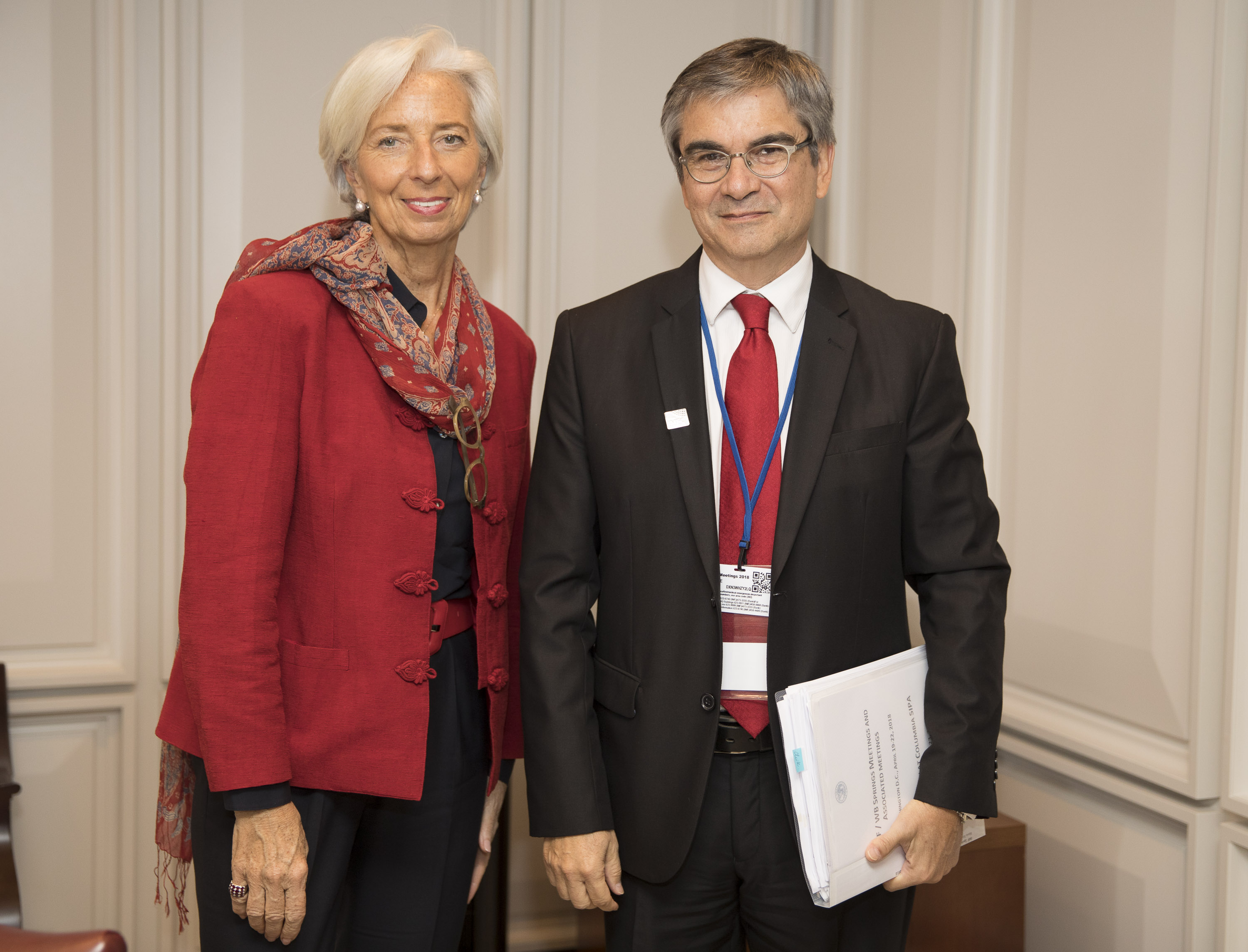
Marcel with IMF managing director Christine Lagarde in 2018

On 25 October 2016, he was appointed by President Bachelet as Governor of the Central Bank, a position he assumed on 11 December, after Rodrigo Vergara completed his five-year term. At the Central Bank of Chile he has carried out a strategic five-year plan 2018–2022, including, among other points, changes in the frequency of information delivery to the market of the Monetary Policy Meetings –reduced from 12 to 8 per year – and the release through the Bank's website of the Monetary Policy Report and the Financial Stability Report before they were presented to the Senate Finance Committee. He also carried out several changes in its management organization and processes, aimed at streamlining decision-making, optimizing processes and contributing to the institutional sustainability. International Monetary Fund (IMF), Ex-Officio Member of the Board of Governors (since 2016).

== Awards and recognitions ==
- Central Bank Governor of the Year (2020), Latin America, GlobalMarkets papers.
- Economist of the year 2017. Awarded by the “Economy and Business” section of El Mercurio newspaper.
- Most Influential Economist in 2017. Awarded by the Diario Financiero newspaper.
- Member since 2009 of the Circle of Honor of the Economics and Business School, University of Chile.
- Risk & Insurance Finance Prize 2009.
- World Leader in Management for Development Results, MfDR Sourcebook, The World Bank, 2009.
- Best Student of the Business Administration class at the University of Chile (1977-1981).

== Publications ==
He has authored and co-authored over 90 publications. Author registration Repec. Some of them are listed below:

=== During his tenure at the Central Bank ===
- Getting Rules into Policymakers’ Hands: A Review of Rules-based Macro Policy. Economic Policy Papers of the Central Bank of Chile. March 2019.
- Can Economic Perception Surveys Improve Macroeconomic Forecasting in Chile? Working Papers of the Central Bank of Chile, (co-authors Carlos Medel, and Nicolás Chanut). OJO Falta el año
- FinTech and the Future of Central Banking. Economic Policy Papers of the Central Bank of Chile. August 2017 (co-authors Carlos Medel, Carlos Madeira, and Pablo Furche).
- Constitucionalismo Económico y la Autonomía Institucional del Banco Central de Chile. Economic Policy Papers of the Central Bank of Chile. August 2017.
- Determinantes de la Inflación de Servicios en Chile. Working Papers of the Central Bank of Chile. July 2017, (co-authors Carlos Medel, and Jessica Mena).
- Transiciones Laborales y la Tasa de Desempleo en Chile. Working Papers of the Central Bank of Chile. August 2016, (co-author Alberto Naudon).

=== Previous studies on fiscal policy ===
- Los Fondos Soberanos y la Política Fiscal en Chile 2006–2010. Cieplan. November 2010, (co-author Alejandra Vega).
- Presupuestos para el Desarrollo en América Latina, (co-authors M. Guzmán, and M. Sanginés), Inter-American Development Bank, 2014.
- Budgeting for Fiscal Space and Government Performance beyond the Great Recession, OECD Journal on Budgeting, Volume 2013/2, pp. 9–48.
- The Structural Balance Rule in Chile: Ten years, Ten Lessons, Discussion Paper IDB-DP-289, Inter-American Development Bank, Fiscal and Municipal Management Division, June 2013.
- Structural Fiscal Balances: Methodological, Conceptual and Practical Alternatives, Discussion Paper IDB-DP-288, Inter-American Development Bank, Fiscal and Municipal Management Division, June 2013.
- Fiscal Consolidation in OECD Countries, (co-authors Jon R. Blondal, and Knut Klepsvik), Budget and Public Expenditure, 69-(4/2012), pp. 23–52, Madrid, March 2013.
- Structural Budget Balance: Methodology and Estimation for the Chilean Central Government 1987–2001. Seminars and Conferences, United Nations Economic Commission for Latin America and the Caribbean (ECLAC). August 2003, (co-authors Marcelo Tokman, Rodrigo Valdés, and Paula Benavides).
- Balance Estructural del Gobierno Central. Metodología y Estimaciones para Chile [Structural Balance of Central Government. Methodology and estimates for Chile]. MPRA Paper, University Library of Munich, Germany. September 2001.

=== Other previous studies ===
- Effectos de la Crisis Financiera sobre los Sistemas de Pensiones en America Latina. IDB Publications (Working Papers), Inter-American Development Bank. December 2010, (co-author Waldo Tapia)
- Movilidad, Desigualdad y Política Social en América Latina. Cieplan. February 2009.
- Modelos Alternativos de Descentralización y la Experiencia Chilena. Cieplan. July 2008.
- Natural Disasters Financial Risk Management. Technical and Policy Underpinnings for the Use of Disaster-Linked Financial Instruments in Latin America and the Caribbean (co-authors Torben Anderse, Guillermo Collich, Kurt Focke, and Juan José Durante), Technical Notes IDB-TN-175, Inter-American Development Bank, 2010.
- La Asignatura Pendiente. Hacia una Revalidación de la Educación Pública de Gestión Local en Chile (co-author Dagmar Raczynski), Cieplan-Uqbar Editores, Santiago, Chile, 2009.
- Comments on the documents presented in Session IV: Ageing and Pension Systems. Seminars and Conferences, United Nations Economic Commission for Latin America and the Caribbean (ECLAC). August 2000.
- Descentralización Fiscal: El Caso Chileno. Historical Series, United Nations Economic Commission for Latin America and the Caribbean (ECLAC). April 1994, (co-author José Espinoza).
- Developmentalism, Socialism, and Free Market Reform: Three Decades of Income Distribution in Chile. Policy Research Working Paper Series, The World Bank. September 1993, (co-author Andrés Solimano).
- Labour Market Indicators: Leading Indicators for Employment Forecasting in Developing Countries. November 1990.
- Several articles in Colección Estudios Cieplan.

Government offices
Preceded by Joaquín Vial Ruiz-Tagle	Director of the Budget Division of Chile; 2000–2006	Succeeded by Alberto Arenas de Mesa
Preceded by Rodrigo Vergara	President of the Central Bank of Chile; 2016–2022	Succeeded by Rosanna Costa
Preceded by Enrique Marshall Rivera	Counselor of the Central Bank of Chile; 2015–2022	Succeeded by Stephany Griffith-Jones
Political offices
Preceded by Rodrigo Cerda	Minister of Finance; 2022–2025	Succeeded by Nicolás Grau
