= Alfonso Dulanto Rencoret =

Chilean politician (1943–2025)

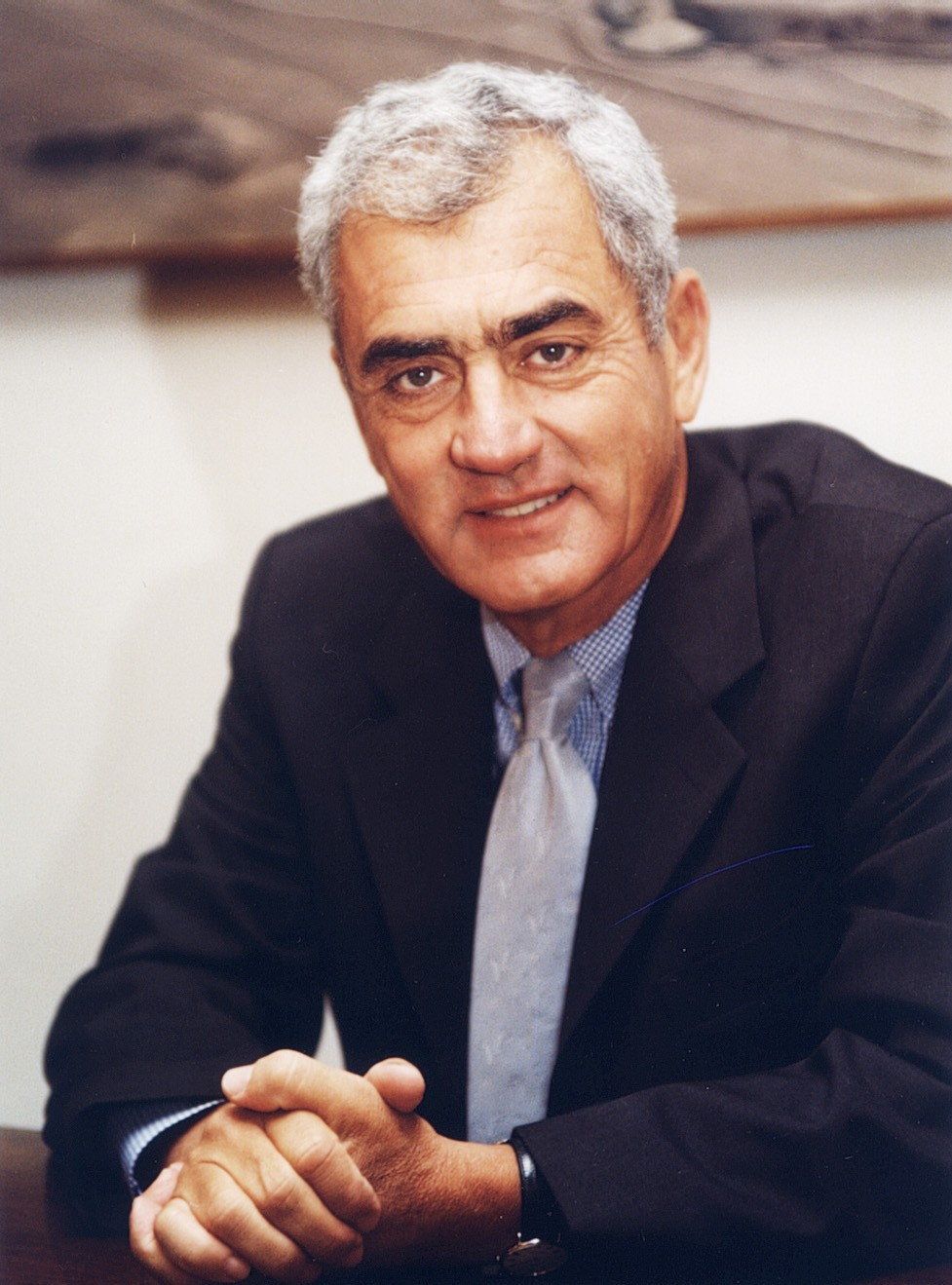
- Weinstein at 2016 FILSA

Minister of Mining
- In office 7 January 2002 – 11 March 2006
- President: Ricardo Lagos
- Preceded by: Jorge Rodríguez Grossi
- Succeeded by: Karen Poniachik

Intendant of the Antofagasta Region
- In office 11 March 2000 – 5 March 2003
- President: Ricardo Lagos
- Preceded by: César Castillo Lilayu
- Succeeded by: Jorge Molina Carrasco

Personal details
- Born: 4 December 1943 Vina del Mar, Chile
- Died: 23 January 2025 (aged 81)
- Party: Close to Christian Democratic Party
- Spouse: Carolina Torres Pascal
- Children: Five
- Education: Pontifical Catholic University of Chile (BA)
- Occupation: Politician
- Profession: Civil engineer

José Alfonso Dulanto Rencoret (4 December 1943 – 23 January 2025) was a Chilean politician and civil engineer who served as minister during Ricardo Lagos' government (2000−2006).

== Early life ==
Dulanto completed his primary and secondary studies at Saint George's College in Las Condes, an upper-middle-class neighborhood of Santiago, the capital of Chile. Later, he studied civil engineering at the Pontifical Catholic University of Chile (PUC), graduating in 1969.

Once he graduated, and thanks to a scholarship from the British Council, Dulanto lived in London, England for two years.

== Career ==
Dulanto started working in mining in 1972 when he joined the state-owned Codelco. He then carried out some business projects related to the field, starting in 1980, in partnership with Alejandro Noemi – executive president of Codelco in the 1990s.

In 1995, Dulanto and the Callejas family – partners in Refimet – sold the Altonorte smelter to Noranda.

Independent pro-Christian Democracy (DC), in the Government of Ricardo Lagos, he was appointed mayor of the main mining region of Chile: Antofagasta (2000). Dulanto was evaluated as one of the best intendants of the government, so he was appointed Minister of Mining in 2002.

The most important events of his administration were the approval of a specific tax project – after an initial failure in the form of royalty – and a higher collection for copper, which reached historical price levels.

While he was a minister, he delegated his personal activities to his brother José Pablo. After his departure, together they began to operate smaller copper and gold mines in the Coquimbo Region. The former Secretary of State also has an agricultural business, producing blueberries and cherries in Chillán for export to China and the United States, respectively.

== Personal life and death ==
Dulanto Rencoret was married to Carolina Torres Pascal, his second wife. He had five daughters. Dulanto Rencoret died on 23 January 2025, at the age of 81.
