= Takatoshi Ito =

Japanese economist (1950–2025)

- 伊藤 隆敏
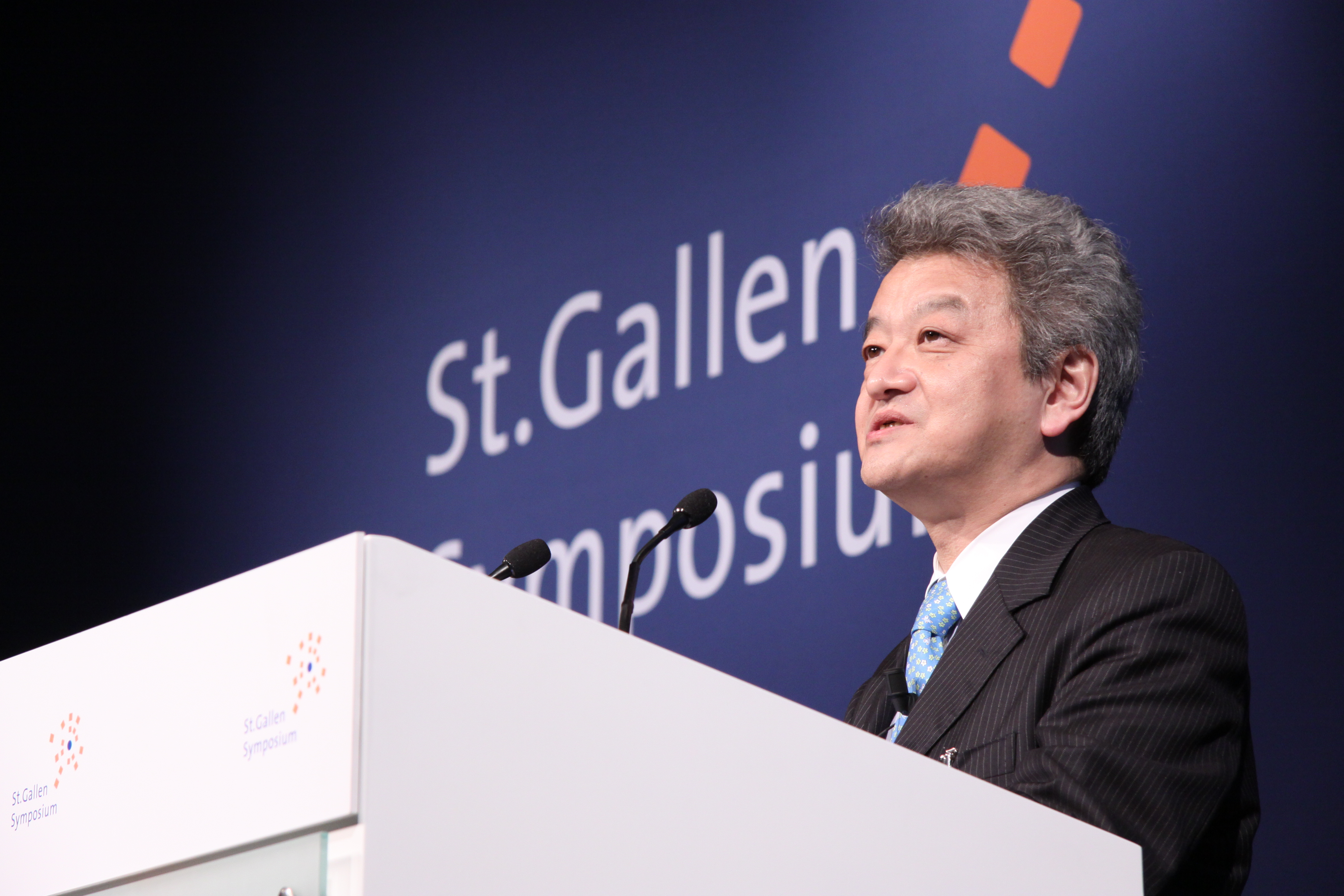
- Takatoshi Ito at St. Gallen Symposium in 2009
- Born: 6 October 1950; Sapporo, Hokkaido, Japan
- Died: 20 September 2025 (aged 74)

Academic background
- Education: Harvard University (Ph.D. 1979); Hitotsubashi University (B.A. 1973)

Academic work
- Discipline: Macroeconomics; Monetary policy International finance Japanese economy
- Institutions: GRIPS; Columbia University; University of Tokyo; Ministry of the Treasury; IMF; Harvard University; Hitotsubashi University; University of Minnesota
- Website: Information at IDEAS / RePEc

Takatoshi Ito (伊藤 隆敏, Itō Takatoshi; 6 October 1950 – 20 September 2025) was a Japanese economist. He was a professor of the School of International and Public Affairs, Columbia University and a senior professor of the National Graduate Institute for Policy Studies.

== Life and career ==
Ito graduated from the Faculty of Economics, Hitotsubashi University in 1973 and from the Graduate School of Economics in the same institute in 1975. He earned a Ph.D from Harvard University in 1979. He served as Deputy Vice Minister of Finance for International Affairs from 1999 to 2001.

A renowned expert in the 1997 Asian financial crisis, some of his notable research focused on international monetary policy for which he advocated increased regional integration to prevent similar crises in the future. His views have been published in some of the world's most influential media, such as The Economist. Ito was reportedly short-listed for the position of Governor of the Bank of Japan (BOJ) following Shinzo Abe's second election as Prime Minister of Japan (the position ultimately went to Haruhiko Kuroda).

Ito was also an affiliated faculty member of the Weatherhead East Asian Institute at Columbia University.

He was the dean of the Graduate School of Public Policy, University of Tokyo in 2012 until 2014.

Ito died on 20 September 2025, at the age of 74.

== Selected publications ==
=== Books ===
- Ito, Takatoshi; Hoshi, Takeo (1992). The Japanese Economy. Cambridge, Massachusetts: MIT Press. ISBN 9780262090292.
- Cargill, Thomas F.; Hutchison, Michael M.; Ito, Takatoshi (1997). The Political Economy of Japanese Monetary Policy. Cambridge, Massachusetts: MIT Press. ISBN 9780262032476.
- Gregorio, José de; Eichengreen, Barry; Ito, Takatoshi; Wyplosz, Charles (1999). An Independent and Accountable IMF. Geneva Reports on the World Economy. Vol. 1. London: Centre for Economic Policy Research. ISBN 1898128456.
- Cargill, Thomas F.; Hutchison, Michael M.; Ito, Takatoshi (2001). Financial Policy and Central Banking in Japan. Cambridge, Massachusetts: MIT Press. ISBN 9780262262101.

=== Journal articles ===
- Engle, Robert F.; Ito, Takatoshi; Lin, Wen-Ling (1990). "Meteor Showers or Heat Waves? Heteroskedastic Intra-daily Volatility in the Foreign Exchange Market" (PDF). Econometrica. 58 (3): 525–542. doi:10.2307/2938189. JSTOR 2938189. S2CID 153586992.
- Ito, Takatoshi (1990). "Foreign Exchange Rate Expectations: Micro Survey Data". American Economic Review. 80 (3): 434–449. JSTOR 2006676.
- Lin, Wen-Ling; Engle, Robert F.; Ito, Takatoshi (1994). "Do Bulls and Bears Move Across Borders? International Transmission of Stock Returns and Volatility". Review of Financial Studies. 7 (3): 507–538. doi:10.1093/rfs/7.3.507. JSTOR 2962266.
- Ito, Takatoshi; Ogawa, Eiji (2002). "On the Desirability of a Regional Basket Currency Arrangement" (PDF). Journal of the Japanese and International Economies. 16 (3): 317–334. doi:10.1006/jjie.2002.0499. S2CID 154311869.
