= Álvaro Bardón =

Chilean politician (1940–2009)

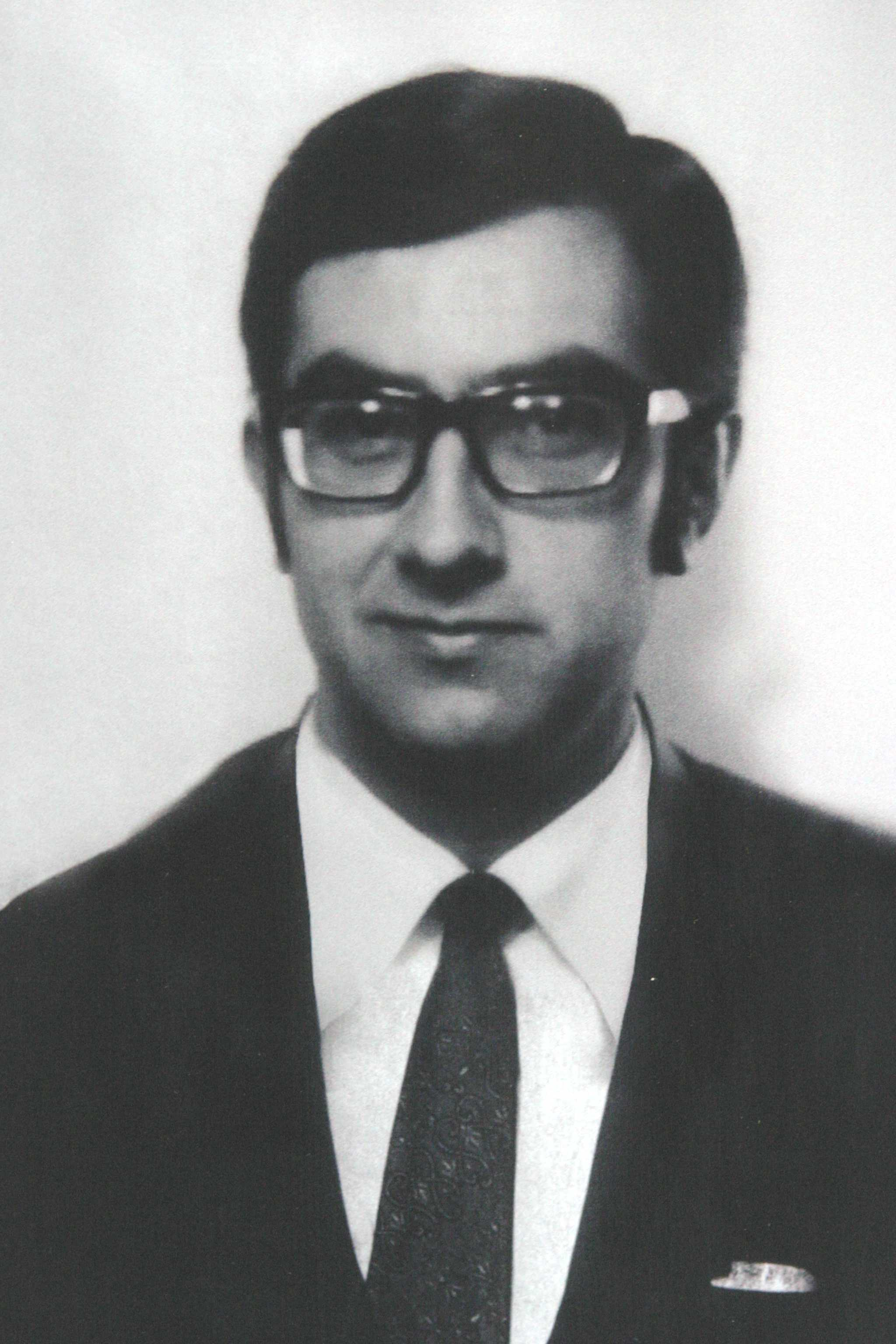

President of the Central Bank of Chile
- In office 1977–1981
- President: Augusto Pinochet
- Preceded by: Pablo Baraona
- Succeeded by: Sergio de la Cuadra

Personal details
- Born: 5 October 1940 Santiago, Chile
- Died: 12 February 2009 (aged 68) Santiago, Chile
- Party: Christian Democracy (1957–1975)
- Education: University of Chile; University of Chicago
- Occupation: Politician
- Profession: Economist

Álvaro Bardón Muñoz (1940–2009) was a Chilean politician and economist who served as President of the Central Bank of Chile.

Economists like Pablo Baraona has referred to him as an original libertarian, opinion that happened to title a book about Bardón.
