= Jorge Leiva Lavalle =

Chilean politician

Minister of Economy, Development and Tourism
- In office 1 August 1998 – 11 March 2000
- President: Eduardo Frei Ruíz-Tagle
- Preceded by: Álvaro García Hurtado
- Succeeded by: José De Gregorio

Personal details
- Born: 31 May 1939 (age 87) Santiago, Chile
- Party: Socialist Party (−1987); Party for Democracy (PPD) (1987−present)
- Spouse(s): Frida Neuenschwander (anul); Patricia Crispi (div); Carmen Tornero (2012−present)
- Children: Two
- Parent(s): Miguel Leiva; María Lavalle
- Education: University of Chile (BA); University of California, Davis (MA)
- Occupation: Politician
- Profession: Economist

Jorge Esteban Leiva Lavalle (born 31 May 1939) is a Chilean politician who served as minister under Eduardo Frei Ruíz-Tagle's government (1994−2000).

== Biography ==
The son of Miguel Luis Leiva Leiva and María Velia Lavalle D'Alencon, he studied economics at the University of Chile. Later, Leiva completed a master's degree and a Ph.D. in economics at the University of California, Davis in the United States.

After finishing his studies, he joined the Central Bank of Chile, becoming the internal credit manager.

In 1972, served as an advisor to the Technical Secretariat of the Government's Economic Committee, when the Marxist president Salvador Allende ruled the country. After the 1973 coup, he went into exile, first to Colombia and then to Venezuela.

At the beginning of the 1980s, Leiva returned to Chile, joining the Economic Work Program (PET) linked to the Academy of Christian Humanism University, where he worked from 1982 to 1987. Then, he went abroad once again, this time to the United Nations Development Program (UNDP).

Once returned to Chile, he was an advisor to the Minister of Economy, Development and Reconstruction in the areas of macroeconomic policy (1990−1994) and international economic relations (1997−1998).

On 1 August 1998, he replaced Álvaro García Hurtado in the Economy and Energy portfolios, positions he held until 1998 and 2000 when Óscar Landerretche Gacitúa and José De Gregorio took office on 11 March 2000 in the new government of Ricardo Lagos (2000−2006). In the other hand, from 2001 to 2007, he was the director –representing the State– of the BioBío Sanitary Services Company (Essbio). Similarly, from 2005 to 2007, he was director of the Economic Program of Fundación Chile 21.

In 2008, he was part of the team that advised José Miguel Insulza during his spell as Secretary General of the Organization of American States (OAS). Here, Leiva had as workmates to Eugenio Rivera, Landerretche, Lisette Henríquez, Luis Eduardo Escobar –son of former Augusto Pinochet minister, Luis Escobar Cerda–, and the journalist Jorge Richards.
