= Barry Eichengreen =

American economist (born 1952)

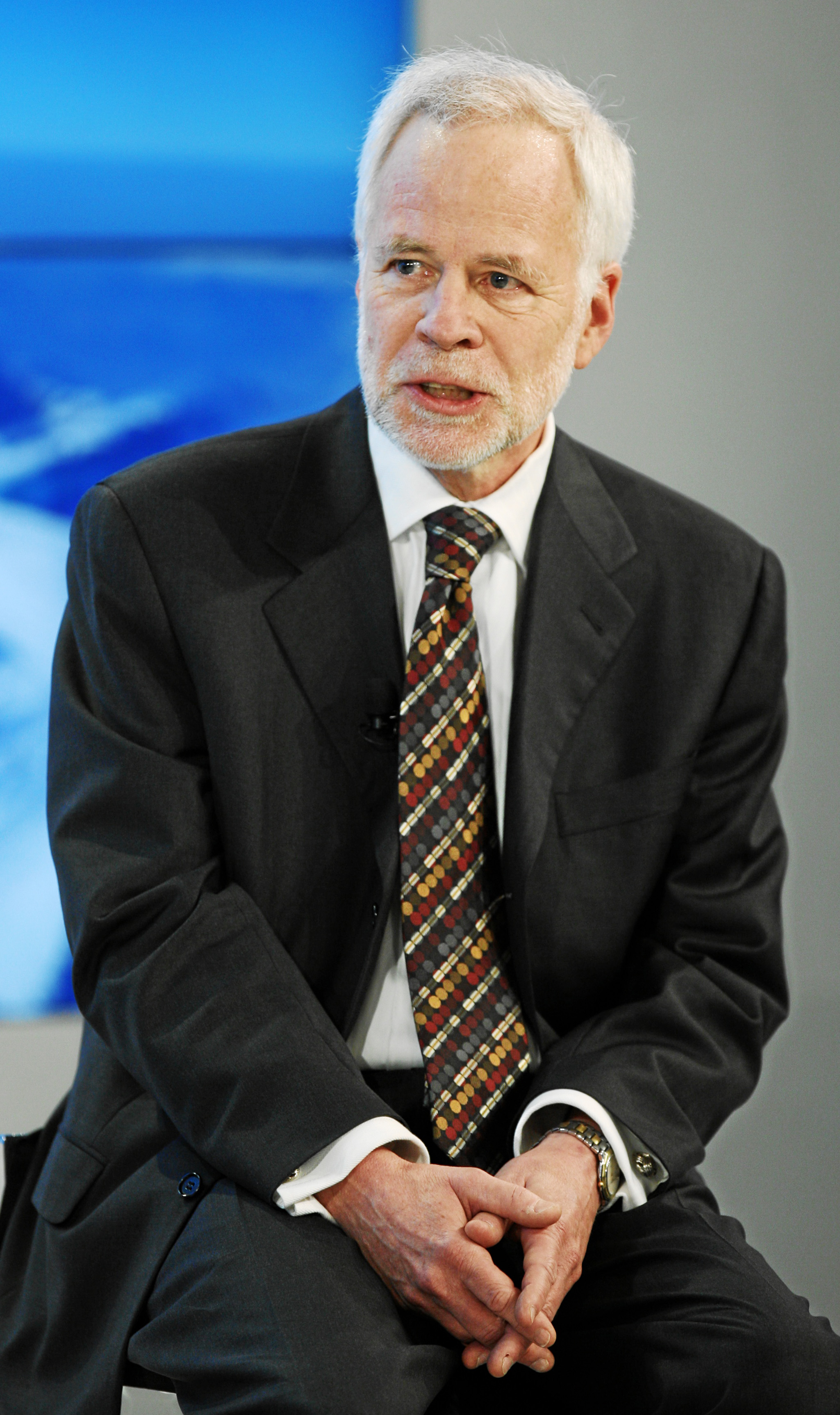
- Eichengreen in 2012
- Born: 1952 (age 73–74)

Academic background
- Education: University of California, Santa Cruz (BA); Yale University (MA, MPhil, MA, PhD)

Academic work
- Discipline: Political economics, economic history
- Institutions: University of California, Berkeley
- Website: eml.berkeley.edu/~eichengr; Information at IDEAS / RePEc

Barry Julian Eichengreen (born 1952) is an American economist and economic historian who is the George C. Pardee and Helen N. Pardee Professor of Economics and Political Science at the University of California, Berkeley, where he has taught since 1987. Eichengreen is a research associate at the National Bureau of Economic Research and a research fellow at the Centre for Economic Policy Research.

== Early life and education ==
Barry Eichengreen was born to German-Jewish parents Dan and Lucille Eichengreen in 1952. His mother was a Holocaust survivor who emigrated to the United States after World War II, meeting her husband in New York. She never spoke to her sons about her experiences during the Holocaust, and only informed them that she was, in fact, a Holocaust survivor when they went off to college. "They both studied history—one has a history degree—they know what transpired. But we don't talk about it."

Eichengreen earned a B.A. from UC Santa Cruz in 1974. He followed this with an M.A. in economics, an M.Phil. in economics, an M.A. in history, and a Ph.D. in economics, all from Yale University in New Haven, Connecticut.

== Career ==
Eichengreen has done research and published widely on the history and current operation of the international monetary and financial system. He was a senior policy advisor to the International Monetary Fund in 1997 and 1998, although he has since been critical of the IMF. In 1997, he became a fellow of the American Academy of Arts and Sciences.

=== Research ===
Eichengreen's best known work is the book Golden Fetters: The Gold Standard and the Great Depression, 1919–1939, published by Oxford University Press in 1992.

In his own book on the Great Depression, Ben Bernanke summarized Eichengreen's thesis as follows:

... [T]he proximate cause of the world depression was a structurally flawed and poorly managed international gold standard... For a variety of reasons, including among others a desire of the Federal Reserve to curb the US stock market boom, monetary policy in several major countries turned contractionary in the late 1920s—a contraction that was transmitted worldwide by the gold standard. What was initially a mild deflationary process began to snowball when the banking and currency crises of 1931 instigated an international "scramble for gold". Sterilization of gold inflows by surplus countries [the USA and France], substitution of gold for foreign exchange reserves, and runs on commercial banks all led to increases in the gold backing of money, and consequently to sharp unintended declines in national money supplies. Monetary contractions in turn were strongly associated with falling prices, output and employment. Effective international cooperation could in principle have permitted a worldwide monetary expansion despite gold standard constraints, but disputes over World War I reparations and war debts, and the insularity and inexperience of the Federal Reserve, among other factors, prevented this outcome. As a result, individual countries were able to escape the deflationary vortex only by unilaterally abandoning the gold standard and re-establishing domestic monetary stability, a process that dragged on in a halting and uncoordinated manner until France and the other Gold Bloc countries finally left gold in 1936.

The main evidence Eichengreen adduces in support of this view is the fact that countries that abandoned the gold standard earlier saw their economies recover more quickly.

His recent books include Global Imbalances and the Lessons of Bretton Woods (MIT Press 2006), The European Economy Since 1945 (Princeton University Press 2007), Exorbitant Privilege: The Rise and Fall of the Dollar and the Future of the International Monetary System (Oxford University Press 2011), The Populist Temptation: Economic Grievance and Political Reaction in the Modern Era (Oxford University Press 2018), and In Defense of Public Debt (Oxford University Press 2021).

His most cited paper is Bayoumi and Eichengreen "Shocking Aspects of European Monetary Unification" (1993) which argued that the European Union was less suitable as a Single Currency Area than the United States.

He has been President of the Economic History Association (2010–2011). In addition to this, he is a non-resident Senior Fellow at the Centre for International Governance Innovation and a regular contributor to Project Syndicate since 2003. He was convener of the Bellagio Group from 2008 to 2020.

== Publications ==
- Elusive Stability: Essays in the History of International Finance 1919–1939. Cambridge University Press, 1990 ISBN 0-521-36538-4
- Golden Fetters: The Gold Standard and the Great Depression, 1919–1939. Oxford University Press, 1992, ISBN 0-19-510113-8
- International Monetary Arrangements for the 21st Century. Brookings Institution Press, 1994, ISBN 0-8157-2276-1
- Reconstructing Europe's Trade and Payments: The European Payments Union. University of Michigan Press, 1994, ISBN 0-472-10528-0
- Globalizing Capital: A History of the International Monetary System. Princeton University Press, 1996, ISBN 0-691-02880-X; 2. Auflage ebd. 2008, ISBN 0-691-13937-7
  - Vom Goldstandard zum EURO. Die Geschichte des internationalen Währungssystems. Wagenbach, Berlin 2000, ISBN 3-8031-3603-2
- European Monetary Unification: Theory, Practice, Analysis. The MIT Press, 1997 ISBN 0-262-05054-4
- with José De Gregorio, Takatoshi Ito & Charles Wyplosz: An Independent and Accountable IMF. Centre for Economic Policy Research, 1999, ISBN 1-898128-45-6
- Toward A New International Financial Architecture: A Practical Post-Asia Agenda. Institute for International Economics, 1999, ISBN 0-88132-270-9
- Financial Crises and What to Do About Them. Oxford University Press, 2002, ISBN 0-19-925743-4
- with Erik Berglöf, Gérard Roland, Guido Tabellini & Charles Wyplosz: Built to Last: A Political Architecture for Europe. CEPR, 2003, ISBN 1-898128-64-2
- Capital Flows and Crises. The MIT Press, 2004, ISBN 0-262-55059-8
- Global Imbalances and the Lessons of Bretton Woods. The MIT Press, 2006, ISBN 0-262-05084-6
- The European Economy Since 1945: Co-ordinated Capitalism and Beyond. Princeton University Press, 2008, ISBN 0-691-13848-6
- Exorbitant Privilege: The Rise and Fall of the Dollar and the Future of the International Monetary System, Oxford University Press, New York 2010 ISBN 978-0-19-975378-9
- with Dwight H. Perkins and Kwanho Shin: From Miracle to Maturity: The Growth of the Korean Economy, Harvard University Asia Center. 2012, ISBN 978-0674066755
- Hall of Mirrors: The Great Depression, The Great Recession, and the Uses-and Misuses-of History, Oxford University Press, New York 2015 ISBN 978-0-19-939200-1
- How Global Currencies Work: Past, Present, and Future 2017
- The Populist Temptation: Economic Grievance and Political Reaction in the Modern Era, Oxford University Press, New York 2018
- In Defense of Public Debt, Oxford University Press, New York 2021
- Money Beyond Borders: Global Currencies from Croesus to Crypto, Princeton University Press, 2026
