= Vittorio Corbo =

Chilean bank governor

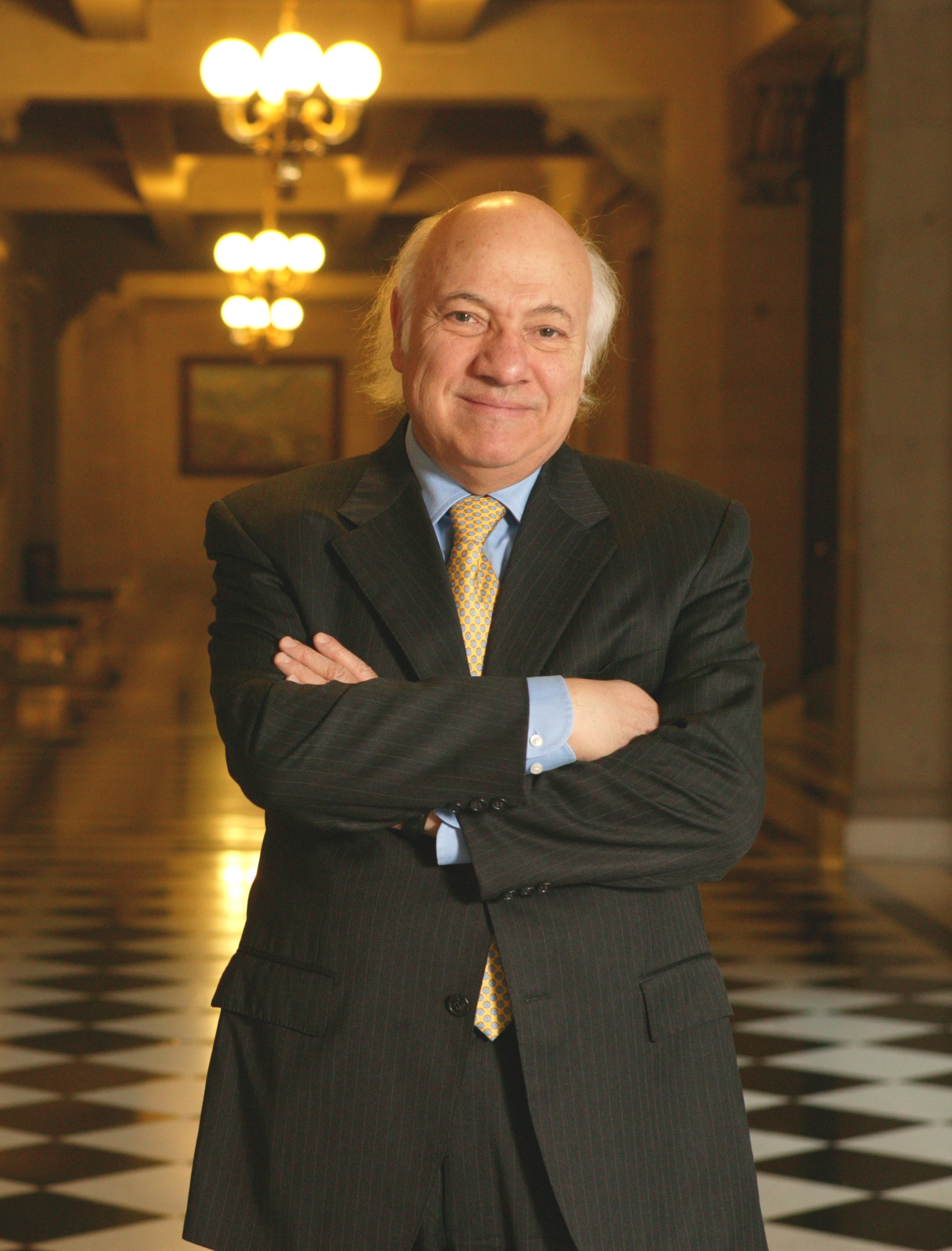

Vittorio Corbo Lioi (born 22 March 1943) is a former Governor of the Central Bank of Chile, who held the post since May 2003 until December 2007.

== Biography ==
Corbo studied economics at the University of Chile in 1967 and has a PhD in economics from MIT which he gained in 1971. He taught at Concordia University in Canada between 1972 and 1979. He was appointed a professor at the Universidad de Chile (1979 - 1981) and at the Pontificia Universidad Catolica (1981 - 1984) and (1991 - present), and a Professorial Lecturer at Georgetown University in the United States (1986–1991). Mr. Corbo worked at the World Bank from 1984 to 1991 as Head of the Macroeconomic Development and Growth Division.

He is also member of the Management Council of the Fundación Chilena del Pacífico (Chilean Pacific Foundation), the International Advisory Council of the Center for Social and Economic Research (CASE) in Warsaw, Poland, and from 1999, a member of the advisory board of the Stanford Center for International Development. He has also served as a vice-president of the International Economic Association (1998–2002). In recent years he has been advisor to the World Bank, the IADB and the International Monetary Fund.

He was Economic Advisor to the Santander-Chile Group (1991–2003), Director of the Santander-Chile Bank (1995–2003), Director of the Universidad de Chile (2000–2003), member of the Management Council of the Global Development Network (1993–2003) and he has been consultant to important national and international firms (1979-1984 and 1991–2003).

Corbo was also Senior Research Fellow at the Research Center for Economic Development and Policy Reform of the Stanford University in California (Summer 1999) and of the Research Department of the International Monetary Fund (Summers 2000 and 2003). He has worked in more than ten countries, lectured at seminars in more than twenty countries and at the most important universities worldwide.

He is author of nine books and over a hundred articles published in books and international periodicals specialising in economic affairs. He is a recognized authority on macroeconomics, international trade and economic development and economic tightness processes. He is also member of the editorial committee of the Journal of Development Economics and of the Journal of Applied Economics.

Political offices
Preceded by Carlos Massad	Governor of Central Bank; 2003–2007	Succeeded by José de Gregorio
