= José De Gregorio =

Chilean economist, academic, and politician

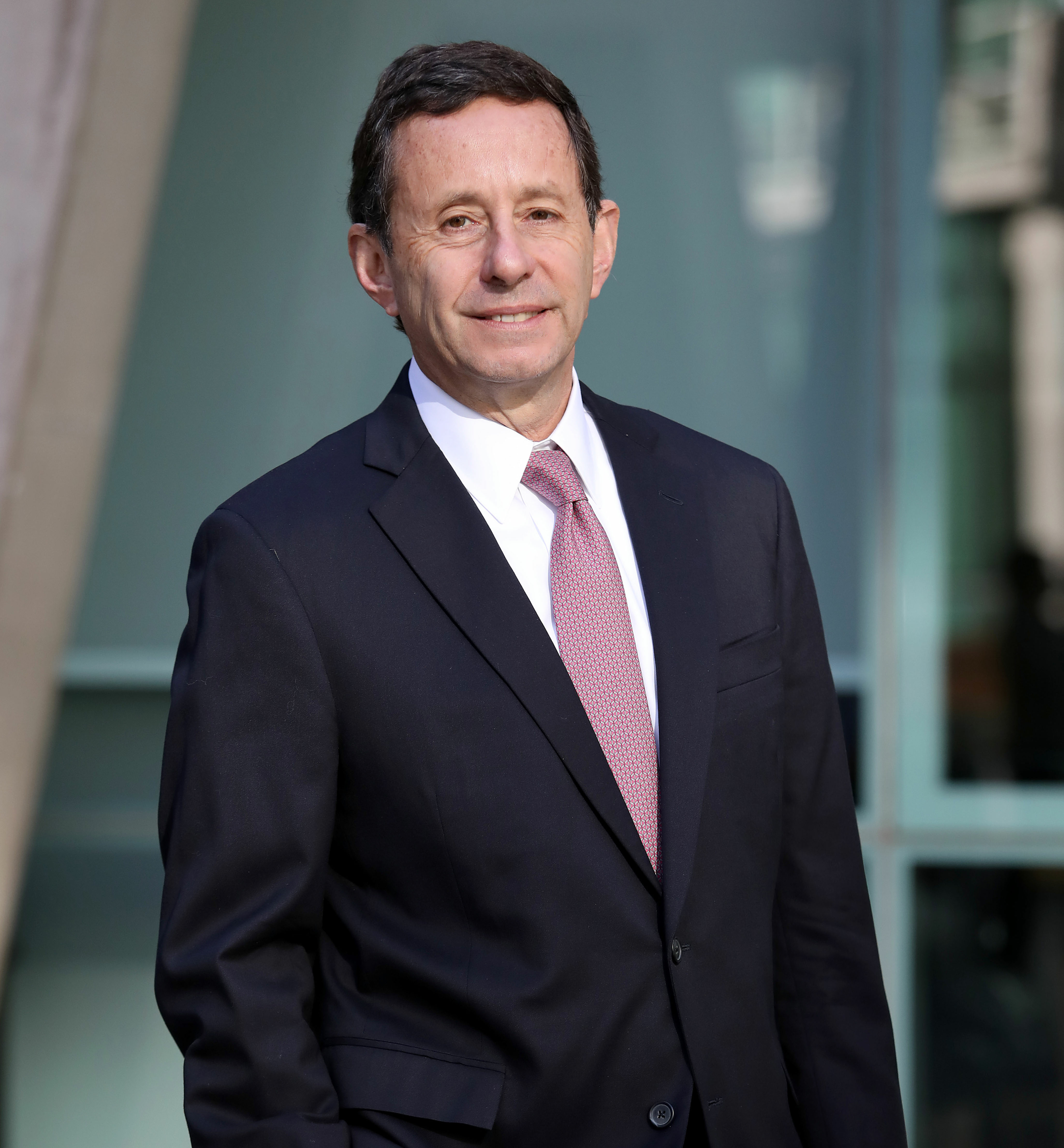

President of the Central Bank of Chile
- In office 7 December 2007 – 7 December 2011
- Preceded by: Vittorio Corbo
- Succeeded by: Rodrigo Vergara

Counselor of the Central Bank of Chile
- In office 21 June 2001 – 7 December 2011
- Preceded by: Pablo Piñera
- Succeeded by: Joaquín Vial Ruiz-Tagle

Minister of Economy, Development and Tourism
- In office 11 March 2000 – 19 June 2001
- Preceded by: Jorge Leiva Lavalle
- Succeeded by: Jorge Rodríguez Grossi

Minister of Mining
- In office 11 March 2000 – 19 June 2001
- Preceded by: Sergio Jiménez Moraga
- Succeeded by: Jorge Rodríguez Grossi

Minister of the Energy
- In office 11 March 2000 – 19 June 2001
- Preceded by: Óscar Landerretche
- Succeeded by: Jorge Rodríguez Grossi

Personal details
- Born: José Fernando De Gregorio Rebeco; August 17, 1959 (age 67) Santiago de Chile, Chile
- Party: Christian Democratic Party (Chile) (Until 2022)
- Spouse: Soledad Aninat (m. 1984)
- Children: 4
- Education: Universidad de Chile; Massachusetts Institute of Technology
- Website: degregorio.cl

José De Gregorio Rebeco (born August 17, 1959) is a Chilean economist, academic, researcher, consultant and politician. He has been the Governor of the Central Bank of Chile, Minister of the Economy, Mining and Energy during the administration of Ricardo Lagos and served for eight years as dean of the Faculty of Economics and Business at the University of Chile. He is also a nonresident Senior Fellow at the Peterson Institute for International Economics.

== Biography ==
He is the son of José De Gregorio Aroca, who was Secretary General of the Christian Democratic Party during the governments of Eduardo Frei Montalva, Salvador Allende, and even for some time in hiding under the regime of Augusto Pinochet, and of María Rebeco Castro, professor, who was the Headmistress of the Liceo Nº1 Javiera Carrera for girls. In 1984, he married Soledad Aninat and they have 4 children.

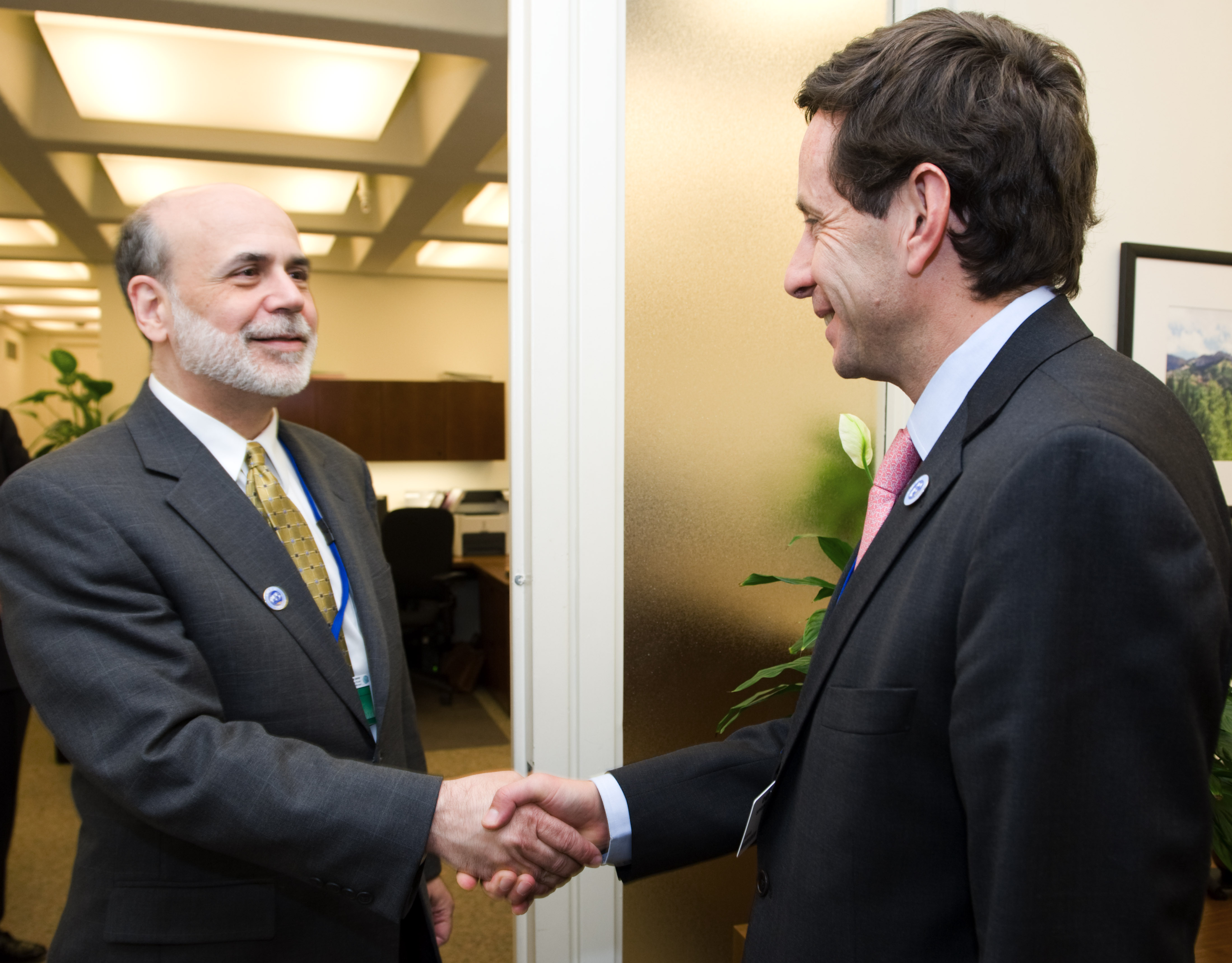
Ben Bernanke and José De Gregorio in The 2010 Annual Meetings of the World Bank Group and the International Monetary Fund will be held in Washington, D.C

== Studies ==
He completed his primary and secondary school studies at the Luis Campino Institute of Humanities in Santiago de Chile. He then studied Industrial Engineering at the Universidad de Chile, going on to study a Masters in Industrial Engineering from the same university, where he received the "Marcos Orrego Puelma" award for the best graduate of his promotion. He obtained his Doctorate (Ph. D.) in Economics in 1990 from the Massachusetts Institute of Technology (MIT) in the United States. His doctoral thesis was entitled "Essays in Economic Fluctuations, Inflation and Financial Innovation".

== Ministerial and Central Bank Positions ==
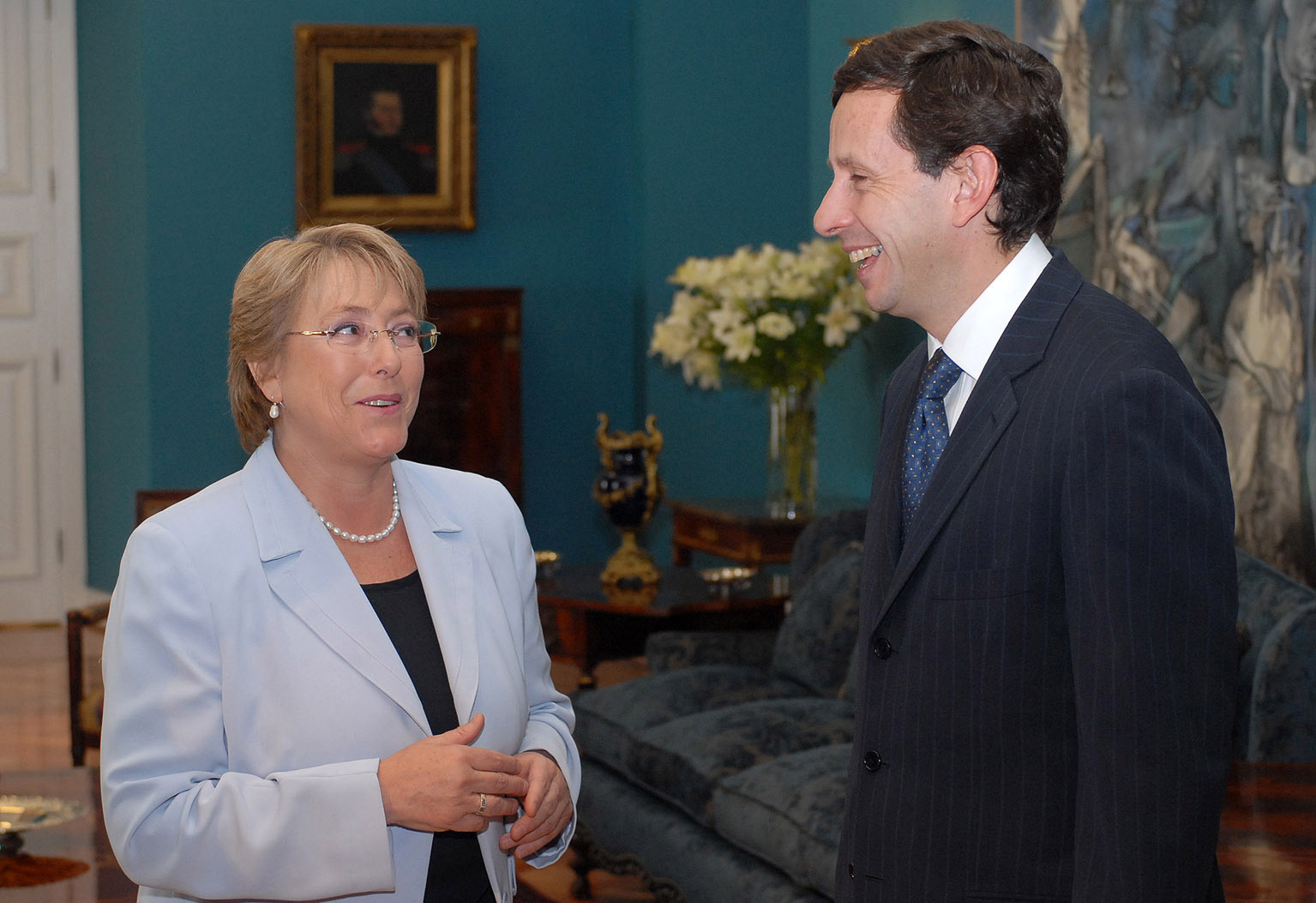
President Michelle Bachelet with José De Gregorio when appointed as President of the Central Bank in December 2007

From 1994 to 1997, De Gregorio worked in the Ministry of Finance as coordinator of Macroeconomic Policies during the management of Eduardo Aninat, replacing his predecessor Joaquín Vial. In 2000, he was appointed by the newly elected President Ricardo Lagos as Minister of the Economy and Mining, as well as Minister of the National Energy Commission (CNE), assuming the tri-minister on March 11 of that year, on the same day that Lagos took over as President of Chile. He left the ministries in June 2001 to serve as an advisor to the Central Bank, after overcoming José Pablo Arellano and Ricardo Ffrench-Davis in an unofficial internal competition. In that institution he held the position left by Pablo Piñera, brother of President Sebastián Piñera, who did not complete his term after leaving as Director of the public television channel. Therefore, De Gregrorio´s position had to be confirmed twice by the Senate: the first time for six months and the second time for ten years. In 2003, he assumed the position of vice president of the Central Bank.

== Central Bank Governor ==
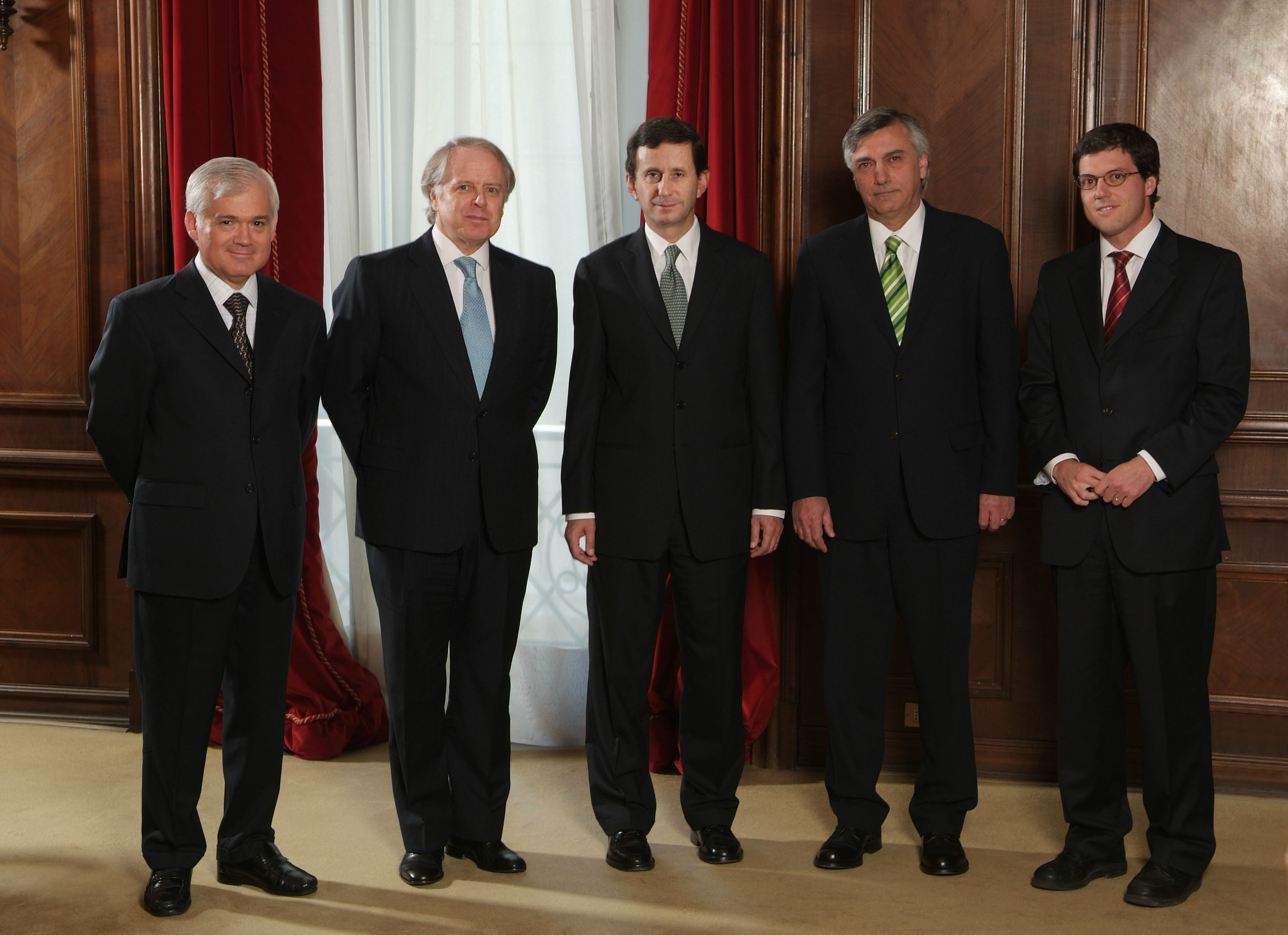
José De Gregorio (at the centre) began his presidency of the Council of the Central Bank of Chile in 2007, when he was a member with Enrique Marshall, Jorge Desormeaux (vice president), Manuel Marfán and Sebastián Claro

In December 2007, he was appointed by President Michelle Bachelet as Chairman of the Board of the Central Bank of Chile, replacing Vittorio Corbo. His main challenge in assuming as president of the issuing institution was to stop the advance of inflation. The shock derived from the greater international value of food and energy meant that, in mid-2008, the established inflation goal of 2-4% per year was long exceeded, standing at 9.5% in the 12 months to July. To combat this situation, the Central Bank began to drastically raise its interest rates (called the Monetary Policy Rate), with the well-known risks of lower growth that this decision implied. This policy had to be abruptly modified in the face of the global economic crisis unleashed at the end of the third quarter of that year. De Gregorio was responsible for presiding over the Central Bank during the 2008 financial crisis, following an aggressive monetary policy. The monetary policy rate was cut from 8.25% at the end of 2018 to 0.5% in July 2009, being the largest rate reduction in Latin America. New instruments were also designed to provide liquidity, and a forward guidance policy was also carried out, once the interest rate reached its minimum. While he was president of the Central Bank, he was also the governor of Chile at the IMF and participated in the IMFC (International Monetary and Financial Committee) in 2010 and 2011.

== Academic work ==
De Gregorio has published widely in international academic reviews and books on issues including stabilization policies, foreign exchange regimes and economic growth. He has served as a referee for several academic journals and is an associate editor with the journals International Tax and Public Finance and Latin American Economic Review. He is also a member of the Executive Committee of the Latin American and Caribbean Economic Association (Lacea) and was co-director of the organizing committee for the annual Lacea meeting in 1999.

De Gregorio is a full professor at the University of Chile (on leave). In 1997 and 2000, he was a professor and head of post-graduate programs at the Center of Applied Economics at the University of Chile, where he has taught macroeconomics and international economics since 1994. He also served on the executive of the Latin American Doctoral Program in Economics, carried out jointly by Mexico’s ITAM, Torcuato di Tella University, Argentina, and the University of Chile.

He is a non-resident senior fellow of the Peterson Institute of International Economics (PIIE). He is also a member of the Latin American Committee on Macroeconomic and Financial Issues (CLAAF). He was also a part-time professor at the Pontifical Catholic University between 2003 and 2011, and a visiting professor at the Anderson School of Management at the University of California – Los Angeles (UCLA), where he was teaching when he was appointed Minister by President Lagos.

He has published more than 100 articles in international academic journals and books on the topics of monetary policy, exchange rates, international finance, and economic growth, and has served as an arbitrator and member of editorial committees of various academic journals. One of his most important articles is "How Foreign Direct Investment Affects Economic Growth", published in the Journal of International Economics in 1998, written with Eduardo Borensztein and Jong-Wha Lee. For several years now, he has been the best-ranking academic in publications and citations in Latin America and in the top 5% globally in the Ideas Repec bibliographic base..

== Other contributions ==
He is a founding partner and director of Espacio Público and Chairman of the Sovereign Funds Investment Committee of the Ministry of Finance. He was a member of the Committee on International Economic Policy and Reform of the Brookings Institution and on the Steering Committee of the Latin American and Caribbean Economic Association (LACEA). He is also part of the MIT Sloan Latin America Advisory Council. He was a member of the High Commission on Academic Hierarchy at Diego Portales University and part of the Group of Trustees of the Principles for Stable Capital Flows and Fair Debt Restructuring of the Institute of International Finance. He was an economist in the Research Department of the International Monetary Fund (IMF) during 1990 and 1994 and a consultant to international organizations such as the World Bank, Inter-American Development Bank (IDB) and the United Nations. Between 1983 and 1986, he was a Researcher for the Corporation of Studies for Latin America (CIEPLAN) of the United Nations. 2016- 2018: Chairman of the Senior Council, CEBRA, Central Bank Research Association. 2011: President of the Consultation Council for the Americas (CCA) of the Bank for International Settlements. He is part of various directories and also advises companies on economic and financial matters. Thinking although he has defined himself as liberal in the economic field, but conservative in his values system (he is a Roman Catholic), others consider him, above all, a pragmatic economist who has followed the line of his mentor, Rudiger Dornbusch, one of the most important economists in the area of international macroeconomics of the second half of the 20th century and mentor to various global economic authorities and leading academics. During the difficult years between 1998 and 1999, he was critical of the policies of the Central Bank, since he was in favour of a different combination of policies with a lower interest rate and a more flexible exchange rate. He was also critical of the proposed labour reform shortly before the election of Ricardo Lagos, being contrary to the idea of inter-company negotiation.

== Awards and honors ==
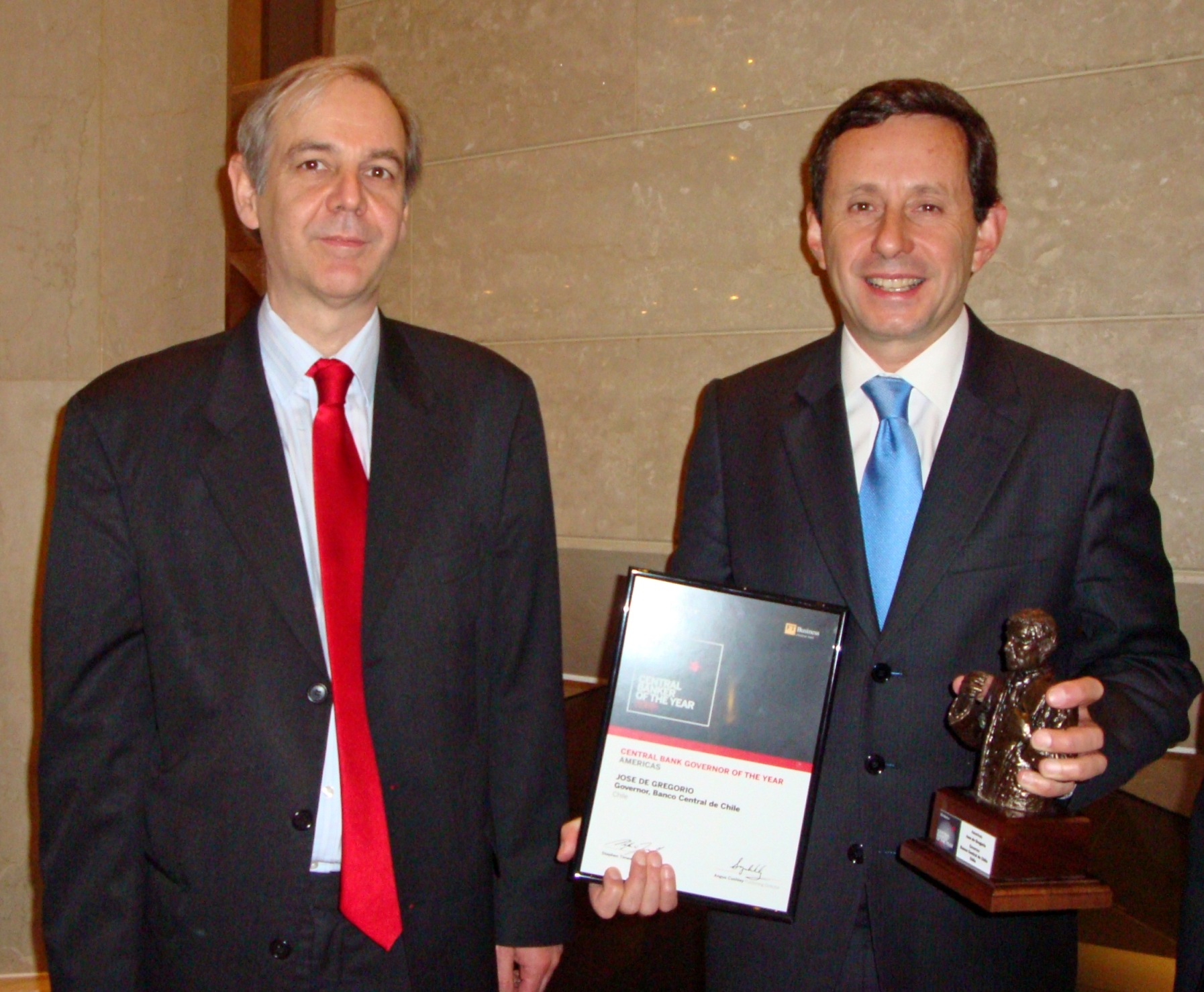
The Bankers Award presented to José De Gregorio as the best President of the Central Bank of Latin America in 2008

- “Marcos Orrego Puelma” for the best graduate student of his Civil Engineering promotion at the Universidad de Chile, 1984.
- “Outstanding Industrial Engineer” delivered by the Industrial Civil Engineers Corporation (ICI), Universidad de Chile, 2008.
- “Central Banker of the year in Latin America for 2008”, The Banker London.
- “Central Banker of the year in Latin America for 2008”, Emerging Markets, Istanbul, 2009.
- “Economists of the year” by the newspaper El Mercurio, 2011.
- “Monetary Club Award”, Universidad Finis Terrae 2011, inaugural prize.
- “To the Engineer for Distinguished Actions”, Institute of Engineers of Chile, 2012.

== Books ==
- MF Reform: The Unfinished Agenda, co-authors: Barry Eichengreen, Takatoshi Ito, and Charles Wyplosz, Geneva Reports on the World Economy 20, CEPR Press, 2018.
- How Latin American Weathered the Global Financial Crisis, Peterson Institute of International Economics, 2014.
- Macroeconomía. Teoría y Políticas, Pearson Educación, Prentice-Hall, 2007.
- An Independent and Accountable IMF, co-authors: Barry Eichengreen, Takatoshi Ito, and Charles Wyplosz, Geneva Reports on the World Economy 1, CEPR Press, 1999.

Political offices
Preceded by Vittorio Corbo	Governor of Central Bank; 2007–2011	Succeeded by Rodrigo Vergara
