= Rodrigo Cerda =

Chilean economist and politician

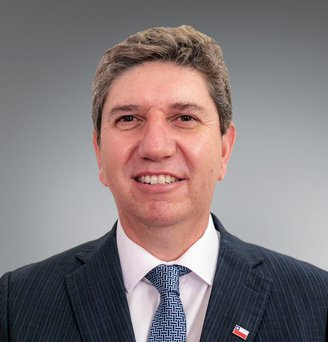

Minister of Finance of Chile
- In office January 26, 2021 – March 11, 2022
- President: Sebastián Piñera
- Preceded by: Ignacio Briones
- Succeeded by: Mario Marcel

Personal details
- Born: 13 February 1973 (age 53) Santiago, Chile
- Education: Pontifical Catholic University of Chile (BS); University of Chicago (MBA)

Rodrigo Andrés Cerda Norambuena (born February 13, 1973) is a Chilean economist and politician. Between March 2018 and December 2019, he served as Budget Director. He afterwards served as Minister of Finance under the second government of Sebastián Piñera between January 2021 and March 2022.

== Early life and education ==
Cerda has a doctorate and a master's degree in economics from the University of Chicago, a master's degree in applied macroeconomics, and a commercial engineer with a major in economics from the Pontifical Catholic University of Chile.

== Career ==
From March 12, 2014 to February 28, 2018, Cerda served as alternate director of the Latin American Center for Economic and Social Policies. In the same period, he was an adjunct professor at the Institute of Economics of the Pontifical Catholic University.

Between 2010 and 2014, during the first government of Sebastián Piñera, Cerda was general coordinator of advisers and macroeconomic coordinator of the Ministry of Finance.

In February 2018, Cerda was called to be part of the cabinet of the second government Sebastián Piñera, occupying the position of Director of Budgets. He resigned on December 12, 2019.

On January 29, 2020, Cerda was appointed by Piñera as director of Codelco, he would remain in office until May 2022.

=== Minister of Finance, 2021–2022 ===
On January 26, 2021, Cerda was appointed Ministry of Finance to replace Ignacio Briones after he left office for a presidential candidacy.

== Other activities ==
- Inter-American Development Bank (IDB), Ex-Officio Member of the Board of Governors (since 2021)
