= Central Bank of Chile =

Monetary Authority of Chile

Coordinates: 33°26′28″S 70°39′10″W

Central Bank of Chile Banco Central de Chile
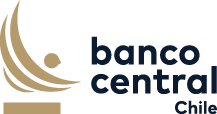

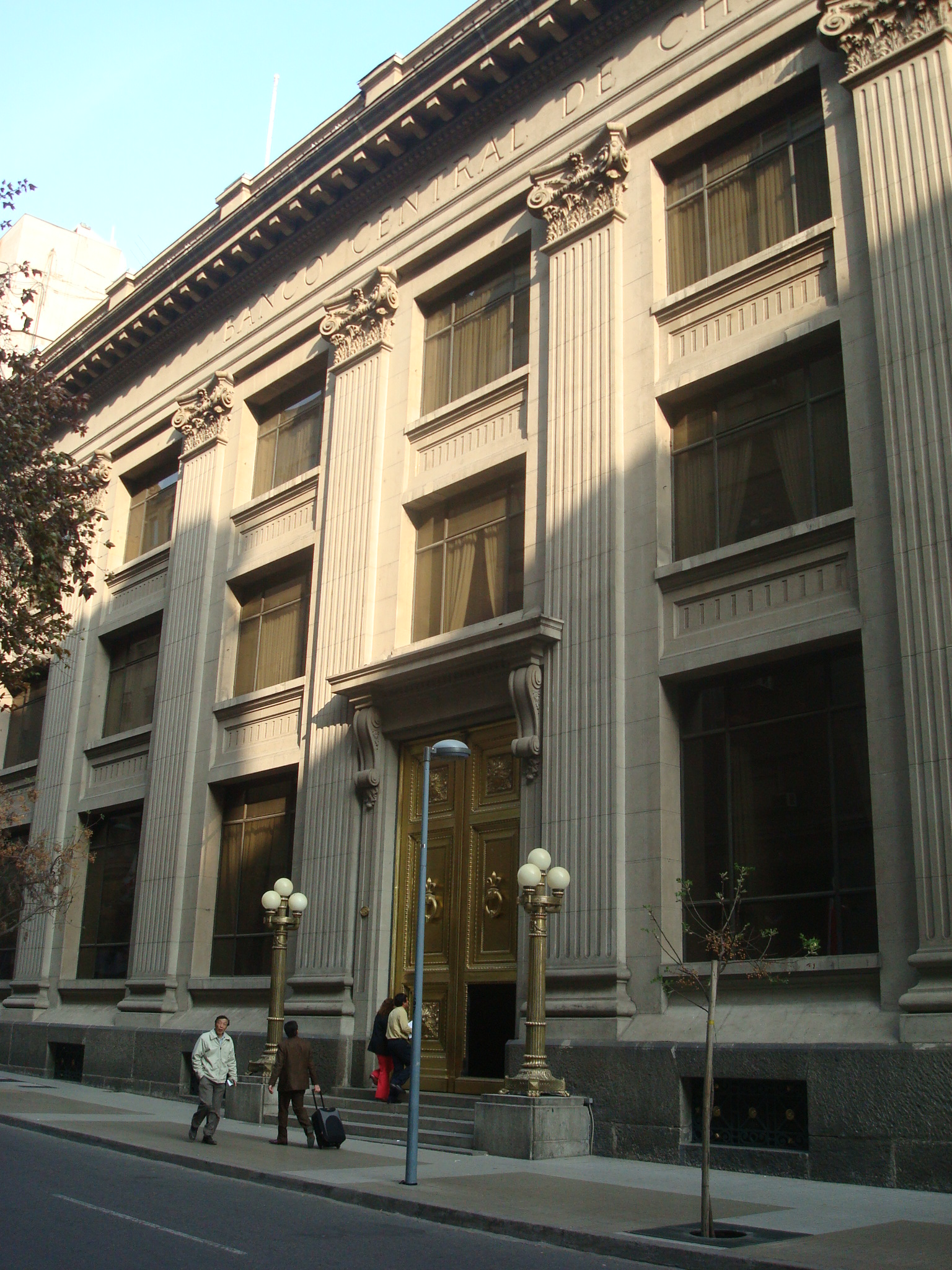
- Front view of the Central Bank of Chile building
- Central bank of: Chile
- Headquarters: Agustinas 1180, Santiago, Chile
- Established: August 22, 1925
- Ownership: 100% state ownership
- President: Rosanna Costa
- Currency: Chilean peso CLP (ISO 4217)
- Reserves: $42.5 billion
- Interest rate target: 6,25% (2024)
- Website: www.bcentral.cl

The Central Bank of Chile (Spanish: Banco Central de Chile) is the central bank of Chile. It was established in 1925 and is incorporated into the current Chilean Constitution as an autonomous institution of constitutional rank. Its monetary policy is currently guided by an inflation targeting regime.

== History ==
Starting in the mid-19th century, private banks started to thrive in Chile, spurring growing concerns over the control of payment methods and persistent inflation. To this end, the government hired a mission led by economics professor Edwin Kemmerer of Princeton University and based the nascent central bank's structure in one of the mission proposals. In August 1925, the Central Bank of Chile (CBoC) was created through Decree Law 486, which also established the bank's monopoly for issuing bank notes under a gold standard regime. A degree of independence to avoid capture by the public or private sectors was implicit in its ten-member board structure.

Inflation, however, did not recede. Moreover, it was further heightened by a weak institutional framework. Inflation would only be controlled after the introduction of autonomy of constitutional rank in 1989.

== Institutional framework ==
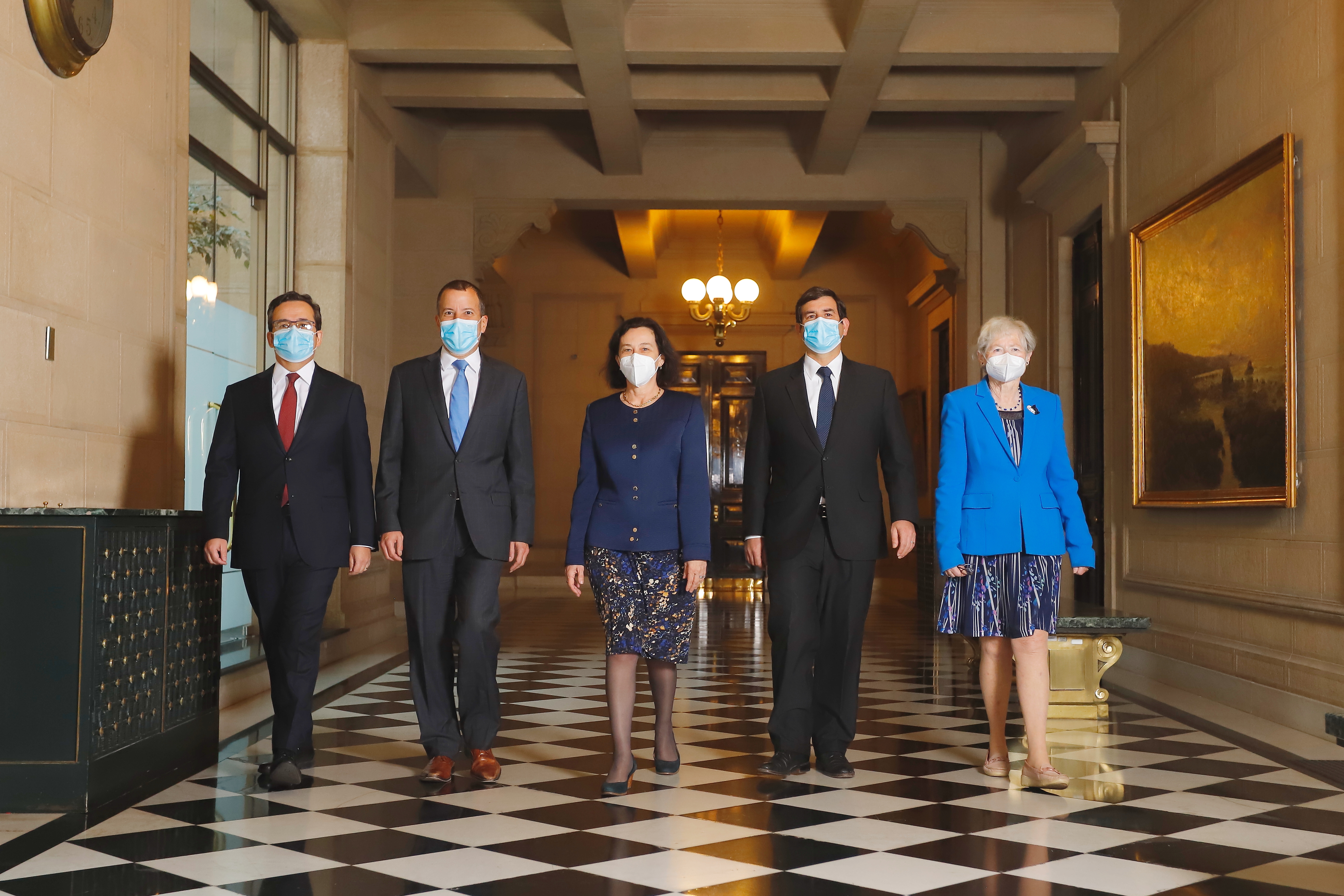
Board of Central Bank of Chile. March 2022.

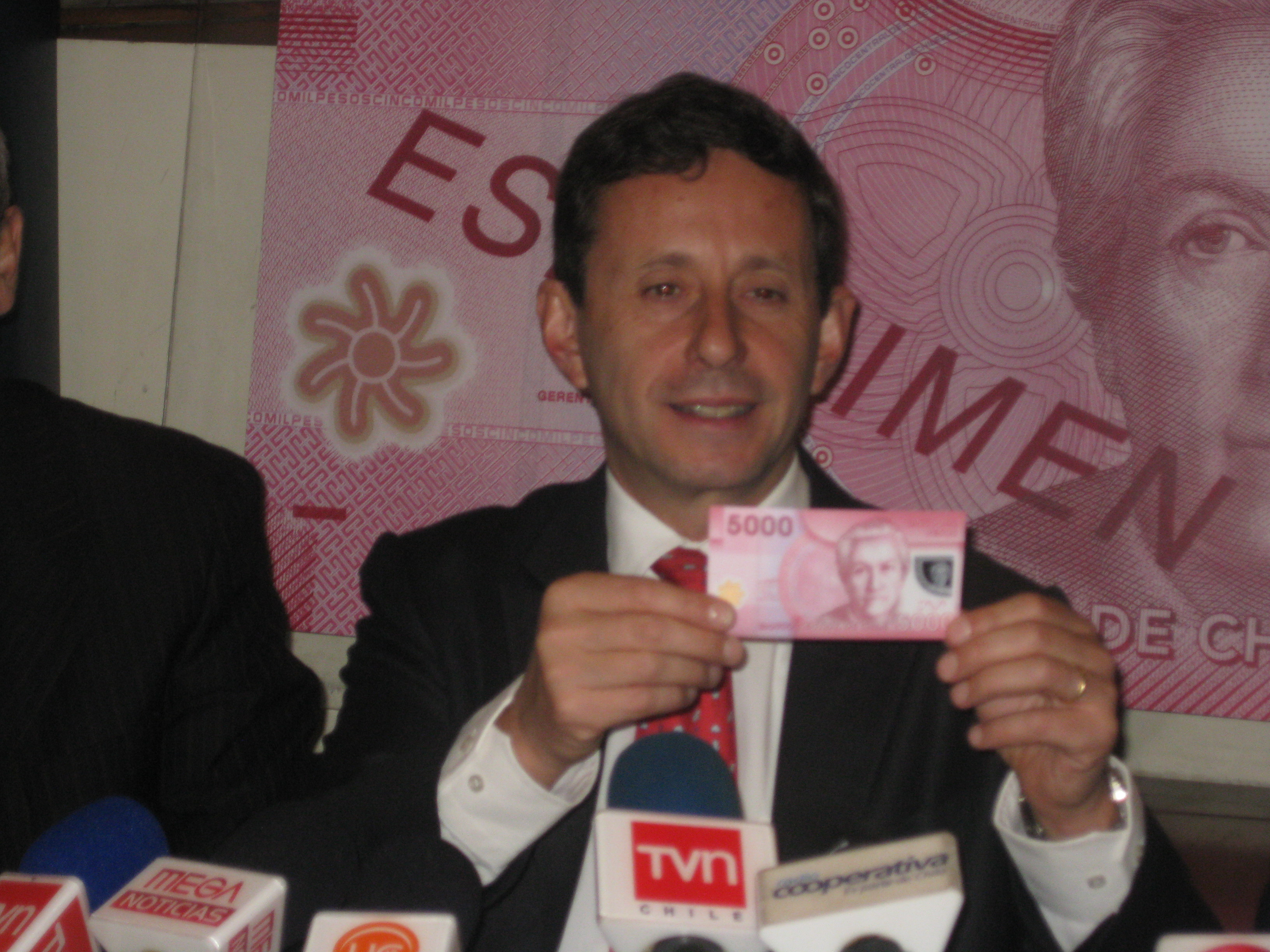
Central Bank President José de Gregorio Rebeco presenting the new $5,000 bill in 2009.

The CBoC is granted autonomous status by Chile's National Constitution, in order to secure independence from national authorities, providing credibility and stability beyond the political cycle. According to the Basic Constitutional Act of the Central Bank of Chile (Law 18,840), its main objectives are to safeguard "the stability of the currency and the normal functioning of internal and external payments". Therefore, the CBoC needs to control inflation to foster a stable currency, while the payment system's normality requires functional financial intermediation, the provision of payment services and adequate risk allocation. To meet these objectives, the CBoC is enabled to use monetary and foreign exchange policy instruments, along with some discretion on financial and capital markets regulation.

The CBoC is governed by a Board composed of five members appointed by the president, but ratified by the senate. Each term is ten years long and members are chosen in a staggered way every two years. The president appoints the Governor of the Board (and the bank) from existing members, for the minimum between the chosen member's remaining term and five years. At least three members need to be present for the board to operate and measures are adopted with the support of the majority of present members. The Minister of Finance also participates in board meetings with the right to speak and, unless there is full consensus among board members, can suspend board resolutions for 15 days.

== Policies ==
The CBoC is Chile's monetary authority and its monetary policy is guided by an inflation targeting regime, which is fully in place since 1999. Specifically, the CBoC pursues an inflation target of 3%, with a tolerance range of 1% (above or below), with the objective of anchoring market expectations in a two-year horizon. Decisions on the monetary policy rate (MPR), the reference interest rate for the economy, usually take place on a monthly basis in the monetary policy meetings, although extraordinary meetings can be called. If inflation expectations are diverging from the 3% target or if there are events since the previous meeting with an anticipated effect in the price level, the CBoC might change the MPR. The monetary policy is carried out through the daily interbank interest rate. Inflation has followed a relatively stable trajectory since the inception of the targeting regime, remaining under 10% ever since; yearly inflation only surpassed the tolerability threshold of 4% in 2007 and 2008, with respective readings of 4.4% and 8.7% in historical terms.

The foreign exchange policy is led by a floating exchange rate, although the bank reserves the right to intervene in the foreign exchange markets. Although unusual, the CBoC has used announced interventions on four occasions since 1999, when the economy transitioned to a floating exchange rate scheme, all of which were sterilized. Twice, in August 2001 and in October 2002, the central bank intervened to deter a depreciation, while the remaining two events, announced in April 2008 and January 2011, were aimed at strengthening the international reserves position of the bank through daily and pre-announced dollar purchases.

== List of governors ==
Picture	Name	Entered office	Exited office	Notes
	Ismael Tocornal Tocornal	1926	† October 6, 1929	
	Emiliano Figueroa	1929	1931	
centro	Francisco Garcés Gana	1931	1932	
	Armando Jaramillo Valderrama	1932	1933	
	Guillermo Subercaseaux Pérez	1933	1939	
centro	Marcial Mora Miranda	1939	1940	
	Enrique Oyarzún Mondaca	1940	1946	
centro	Manuel Trucco Franzani	1946	1951	
	Arturo Maschke Tornero	1953	1959	
	Eduardo Figueroa Geisse	1959	1961	
	Luis Mackenna Shiell	1962	1964	
	Sergio Molina Silva	1964	1967	
	Carlos Massad Abud	1967	1970	
	Alfonso Inostroza Cuevas	1970	1973	
	Carlos Matus Romo	June 2, 1973	September 10, 1973	
	Eduardo Cano Quijada	1973	1975	
	Pablo Baraona Urzúa	1975	1976	
	Alvaro Bardón Muñoz	1977	1981	
	Sergio de la Cuadra Fabres	1981	1982	
	Miguel Kast Rist	April 23, 1982	September 2, 1982	
	Carlos Cáceres Contreras	September 3, 1982	1983	
	Hernán Felipe Errázuriz Correa	1983	1984	
	Francisco Ibáñez Barceló	1984	1985	
	Enrique Seguel Morel	1985	April 3, 1989	
	Manuel Concha Martínez	April 3, 1989	December 9, 1989	
	Andrés Bianchi Larre	December 10, 1989	December 2, 1991	
	Roberto Zahler Mayanz	December 3, 1991	June 30, 1996	
	Carlos Massad Abud	July 1, 1996	2003	
	Vittorio Corbo Lioi	2003	2007	
	José de Gregorio Rebeco	2007	2011	
	Rodrigo Vergara	2011	2016	
	Mario Marcel	2016	2022	
	Rosanna Costa	2022	Present day	

== See also ==
- Chilean peso
- Economic history of Chile
- Economy of Chile
- Ministry of Finance of Chile
- List of central banks
- List of financial supervisory authorities by country
