= Rosanna Costa =

Chilean economist, academic and investigative reporter

Rosanna Costa Costa
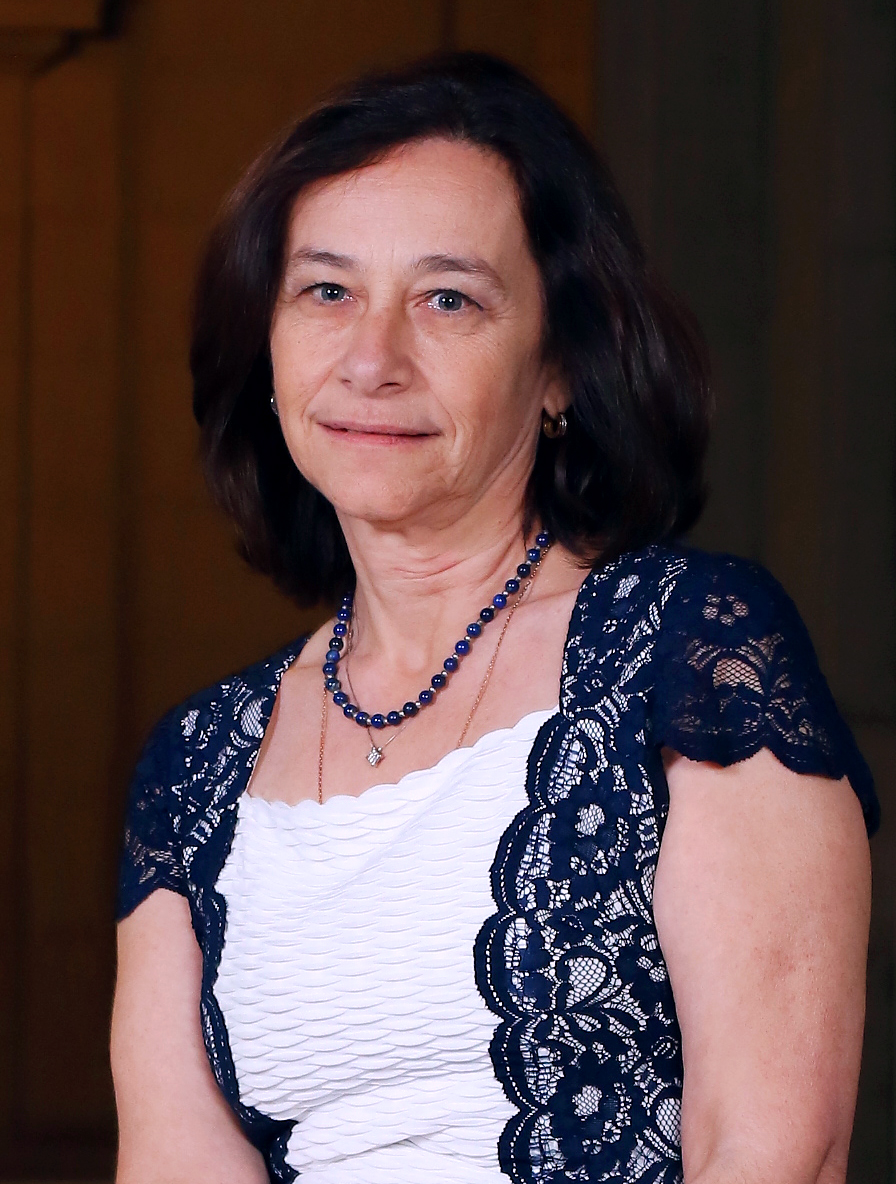

President of the Central Bank of Chile
- Incumbent
- Assumed office 3 February 2022
- Preceded by: Mario Marcel

Counselor of the Central Bank of Chile
- Incumbent
- Assumed office 18 January 2017
- Preceded by: Rodrigo Vergara

Director of the Budget Division Chile
- In office 11 March 2010 – 10 March 2014
- Preceded by: Sergio Granados Roldán
- Succeeded by: Sergio Granados Roldàn

Personal details
- Born: Rosanna Maria Assunta Costa Costa; December 6, 1957 (age 68) Viña del Mar, Chile
- Education: Pontifical Catholic University of Chile
- Website: Official website

Rosanna María Assunta Costa Costa (born 6 December 1957) is a Chilean economist, academic, and researcher. She currently serves as the Governor of the Central Bank of Chile and previously held the position of head of the Ministry of Finance's Budget Office during Sebastián Piñera's first presidency from 2010 to 2014.

== Early life and education ==
Born in Viña del Mar, Costa moved to the capital city at a young age. She attended the Saint Gabriel School and later pursued a degree in Economics at the Pontifical Catholic University of Chile, following in the footsteps of her father, Horacio, who had also studied the same field and worked at the state petroleum company Empresa Nacional del Petróleo (ENAP). Notable contemporaries during her time at the university included Felipe Larraín and Francisco Pérez Mackenna.

== Career ==
In 1984, Costa joined the Central Bank of Chile and worked in the National Accounts Department. She later moved to the Studies department, where she collaborated with economists Juan Andrés Fontaine and Francisco Rosende. One of her responsibilities was to ensure compliance with the limits imposed by the International Monetary Fund during Chile's agreement with the organization. She also led the monetary program team.

In 1992, Costa began working at the neoliberal think-tank Freedom and Development Institute (Instituto Libertad y Desarrollo). Her research primarily focused on macroeconomics, fiscal policies, judiciary matters, and labor issues. During President Michelle Bachelet's tenure, Costa served as a member of both the Pension Reform Commission and the Equity Commission.

On 3 February 2022, President Sebastián Piñera appointed Costa governor of the Central Bank of Chile, succeeding Mario Marcel. She was the first woman to lead the bank.
