= Bernardo Javalquinto =

Economist and academic

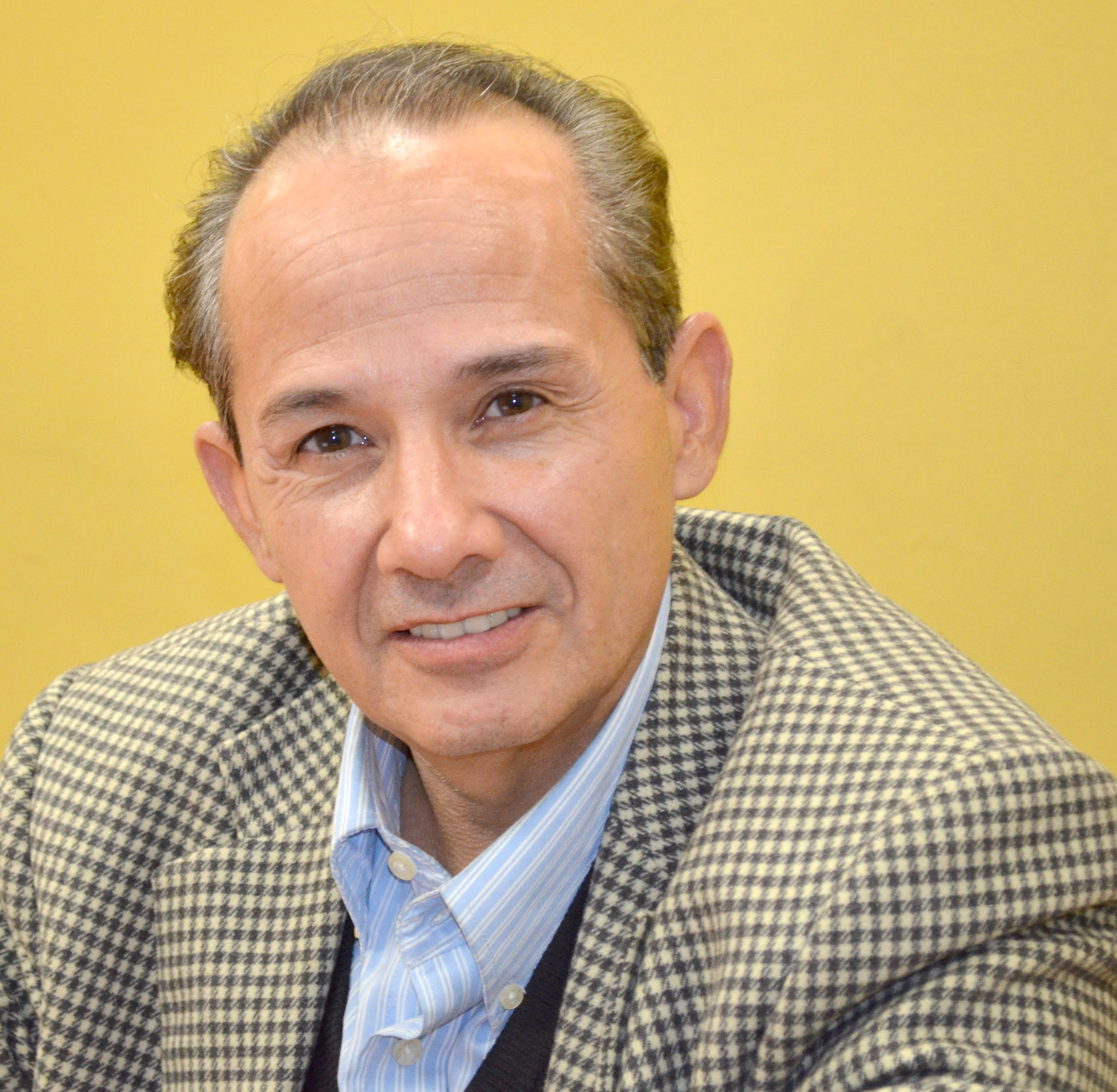

Personal details
- Party: Independent
- Education: University of Maryland
- Occupation: Economist

Bernardo Javalquinto is a Chile-based economist and academic. Bernardo Javalquinto follows a social approach to Economy and is the founder of Escuela De Negocios Sociales (ESN) an academic institute focusing on social business - which he founded with the help of Yunus Center and the CFT of Maule. He is the former president of the Democratic Party of US foreigners in Chile.

== Early life and career ==
Bernardo Javalquinto was born in New York and his childhood was spent in Egypt. His father was a Chilean diplomat to Egypt and his mother was a law graduate and archaeologist and Egyptologist. He studied at the University of Maryland.

He worked at World Bank and International Finance Corporation for more than six years. He also had a failed attempt to recover the defunct airline Latin American Wings (LAW). He got on board as the General Manager after the airline was in a financial crisis. Bernardo found investors in USA and Canada that could help but the Dirección General de Aeronáutica Civil (DGAC) had already revoked LAW's license to operate.

After that, he got on board at a managerial position at Infinity Airlines backed by Canadian and Middle Eastern investors.

== Publications ==
- Como las Empresas Chilenas (Grandes y Pequeñas) Deben Enfrentar la Globalización
- The Economical Model of the Chicago's Boys—Chile a Case of Study
- Social Business: a reform to the prevailing economic model

Javalquinto has also contributed to a few books including In Traders Uluslararası Ticaret Kongresi Kongre Kitabı, Actualizaciones para el Desarrollo Organizacional and Actualizaciones para el Management y el Desarrollo Organizacional. His full-length works include Beneficious Emprendimiento Social.

== Controversies ==
Bernardo has been part of several controversies. As the president of María Mohor Zummers Foundation, he was sued by the board of the foundation for prohibiting the entry of others to the headquarters of the organization and converting it into his own residence and office. Bernardo's lawyer responded that he didn't allow anyone else to enter because there was a theft by the directors of board and they had gotten upset.

Bernardo was also accused of acquiring a BMW for a test drive and not returning it. Bernardo's legal team denied the charge, saying they would file complaints against the owners for the insults.

Sustenta Comunicaciones, an agency that worked with Bernardo for his presidential campaign, accused Bernardo of not paying for services.

== Awards ==
Special Jury Awards in Economics by the presidency of the Giuseppe Sciacca (2015)
