= Michelle Bachelet =

President of Chile (2006–2010; 2014–2018)

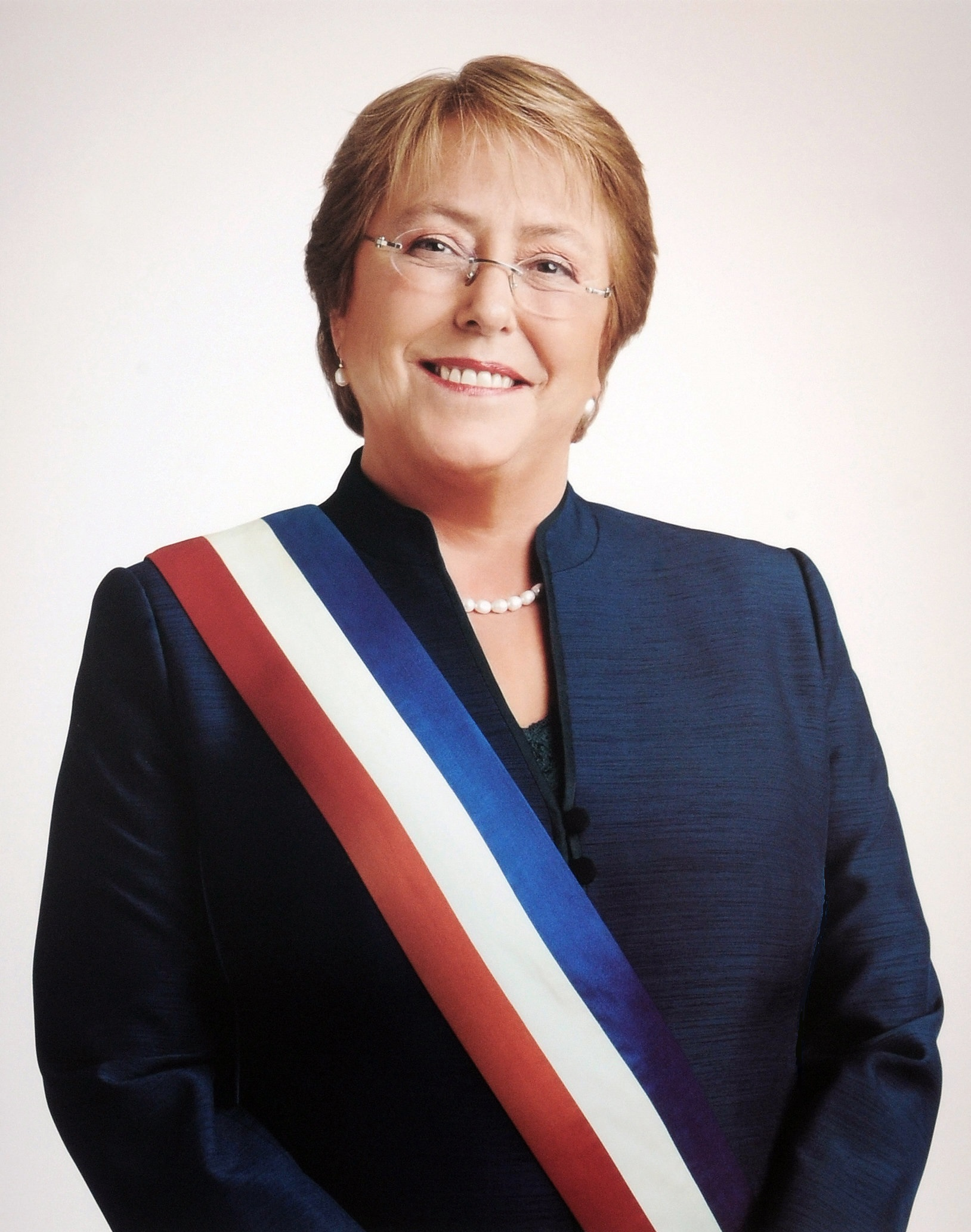
- Official portrait, 2014

34th & 36th President of Chile
- In office 11 March 2014 – 11 March 2018
- Preceded by: Sebastián Piñera
- Succeeded by: Sebastián Piñera
- In office 11 March 2006 – 11 March 2010
- Preceded by: Ricardo Lagos
- Succeeded by: Sebastián Piñera

7th United Nations High Commissioner for Human Rights
- In office 1 September 2018 – 31 August 2022
- Deputy: Kate Gilmore
- Secretary-General: António Guterres
- Preceded by: Zeid Raad Al Hussein
- Succeeded by: Volker Türk

President pro tempore of the Pacific Alliance
- In office 1 July 2016 – 30 June 2017
- Preceded by: Ollanta Humala
- Succeeded by: Juan Manuel Santos

Executive Director of UN Women
- In office 14 September 2010 – 15 March 2013
- Deputy: Lakshmi Puri
- Secretary General: Ban Ki-moon
- Preceded by: Position established
- Succeeded by: Lakshmi Puri (acting)

President pro tempore of UNASUR
- In office 23 May 2008 – 10 August 2009
- Preceded by: Position established
- Succeeded by: Rafael Correa

Minister for National Defense
- In office 7 January 2002 – 1 October 2004
- President: Ricardo Lagos
- Preceded by: Mario Fernández Baeza
- Succeeded by: Jaime Ravinet

Minister for Health
- In office 11 March 2000 – 7 January 2002
- President: Ricardo Lagos
- Preceded by: Álex Figueroa
- Succeeded by: Osvaldo Artaza

Vice President of the Club de Madrid for the Global South and Latin America
- Incumbent
- Assumed office 8 April 2024
- Preceded by: Laura Chinchilla

Personal details
- Born: Verónica Michelle Bachelet Jeria; 29 September 1951 (age 75) Santiago, Chile
- Party: Socialist (since 1970)
- Other political affiliations: Concertación (1988–2013); Nueva Mayoría (2013–2018)
- Spouse: Jorge Dávalos Cartes (m. 1978; sep. 1984)
- Children: 3
- Parents: Alberto Bachelet (father); Ángela Jeria (mother)
- Education: University of Chile (MD)
- Profession: Paediatrician / Public Health Physician
- Website: michellebachelet.org

Verónica Michelle Bachelet Jeria (Spanish: [beˈɾonika miˈtʃel βatʃeˈlet ˈxeɾja]; born 29 September 1951) is a Chilean physician and politician who served as President of Chile from 2006 to 2010 and again from 2014 to 2018. A member of the Socialist Party, she was the first woman to be elected president of Chile and the first woman to serve as Chile's minister of health and minister of national defense.

Bachelet entered politics as a member of the Socialist Youth and was detained and tortured by the military dictatorship of Augusto Pinochet before going into exile in Australia and East Germany. She returned to Chile in 1979, completed her medical studies, and subsequently worked in public health and government. She served as Minister of Health under President Ricardo Lagos from 2000 to 2002 and as Minister of National Defense from 2002 to 2004 before winning the 2005–06 presidential election. Her first presidency included pension and social-protection reforms, the expansion of public services, and the creation of new institutions in areas including the environment and human rights, while also facing major political difficulties including the initial implementation of the Transantiago public-transport system and the aftermath of the 2010 Chile earthquake.

After leaving the presidency, Bachelet served as the first executive director of UN Women from 2010 to 2013 and was again elected president in 2013, becoming Chile's first president to serve two non-consecutive terms. From 2018 to 2022, she served as United Nations High Commissioner for Human Rights, where her office issued reports on human rights situations in countries including China and Venezuela. Since 2024, she has served as vice president of the Club of Madrid. In 2025, she was nominated by Chile for Secretary-General of the United Nations for the 2026–2031 term, but withdrew her candidacy in September 2026 after a troubled campaign that saw the incoming government of President José Antonio Kast, a critic of multilateral institutions, rescind Chile's backing, and her support subsequently collapse in Security Council straw polls.

== Family background ==
Bachelet is the second child of archaeologist Ángela Jeria Gómez (1926–2020) and Air Force Brigadier General Alberto Bachelet Martínez (1923–1974).

Bachelet's great-great-grandfather, Louis-Joseph Bachelet Lapierre (1820–1864), was a French wine merchant from Chassagne-Montrachet who immigrated to Chile with his Parisian wife, Françoise Jeanne Beault, in 1860, after being hired as a wine-making expert by the Subercaseaux vineyards in Santiago. His son Germán, born in Santiago in 1862, married Luisa Brandt Cadot, a Chilean of French and Swiss descent, and their son, Alberto Bachelet Brandt, was born in 1894.

Bachelet's maternal great-grandfather, Máximo Jeria Chacón, of Spanish (Basque) and Greek heritage, was the first person in Chile to earn a degree in agronomic engineering. He founded several agronomy schools in the country and married Lely Johnson, the daughter of an English physician working in Chile. Their son, Máximo Jeria Johnson, married Ángela Gómez Zamora, and they had five children, with Bachelet's mother being the fourth. The Bachelet Jeria household has been described as liberal, secular and progressive for its time: General Bachelet, despite his conventional military upbringing, took part in domestic duties, and his wife pursued an independent professional career; the general also had long-standing ties to Freemasonry as a member of the Grand Lodge of Chile.

== Early life and career ==
=== Childhood years ===
Bachelet was born in the La Cisterna district of Santiago, She was named after French actress Michèle Morgan. Bachelet spent many of her childhood years traveling around Chile, moving with her family between military bases, including Quintero, Antofagasta, and San Bernardo. In 1962, she moved with her family to the United States, where her father was assigned to the military mission at the Chilean Embassy in Washington, D.C. Her family lived for almost two years in Bethesda, Maryland, where she attended Western Junior High School and learned to speak English fluently.

Returning to Chile in 1964, she graduated in 1969 from Liceo Nº 1 Javiera Carrera, a prestigious girls' public high school, finishing near the top of her class. She was class president, a member of the choir and volleyball teams, took part in a school theatre group, and co-founded a band, "Las Clap Clap", which toured local school festivals. In 1970, she entered medical school at the University of Chile, being admitted in the 113th position out of 160 applicants. She had originally intended to study sociology or economics but was persuaded by her father to study medicine, saying she chose medicine because it was "a concrete way of helping people cope with pain" and "a way to contribute to improve health in Chile". While at university, she was drawn into the Socialist Youth, influenced in part by young deputy Carlos Lorca, a fellow student leader at the medical school; her father, meanwhile, was appointed by President Salvador Allende in 1972 to head the Food Distribution Offices (JAP) tasked with combating shortages.

=== Detention and exile ===
When General Augusto Pinochet came to power via the 11 September 1973 coup d'état, Bachelet's father, who had refused to join the plot, was detained at the Air War Academy on charges of treason. Following months of daily torture at Santiago's Public Prison, he suffered a cardiac arrest that resulted in his death on 12 March 1974. In early January 1975, Bachelet and her mother were detained at their apartment by two DINA agents, who blindfolded them and took them to Villa Grimaldi, a notorious secret detention center in Santiago, where they were separated and subjected to interrogation and torture. A memorial to the victims of the dictatorship's repression stands today at the former Villa Grimaldi site.

In 2013, Bachelet said she had been interrogated by DINA chief Manuel Contreras there. She was later transferred to Cuatro Álamos ("Four Poplars") detention center, where she was held until the end of January. Thanks to the assistance of Roberto Kozak, Bachelet was able to go into exile in Australia, where her older brother, Alberto, had moved in 1969.

Of her torture, Bachelet said, in 2004, that "it was nothing in comparison to what others suffered." She and her mother were verbally abused and threatened with the killing of the other; she said she was "never tortured with electricity", although she witnessed it done to other prisoners.

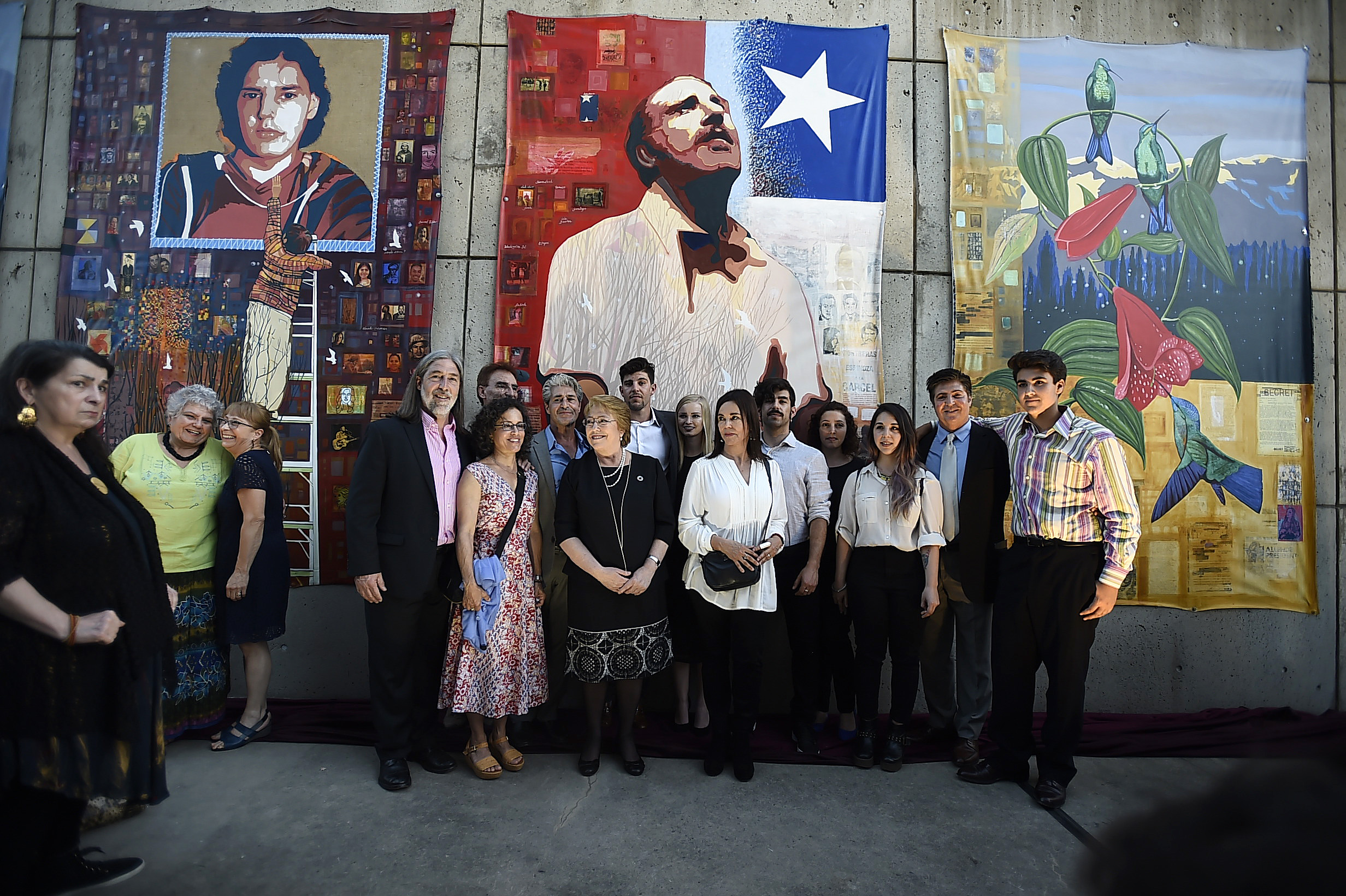
Commemoration of Orlando Letelier, a former Chilean minister, who was assassinated by Pinochet's secret police in Washington, D.C., in 1976

In May 1975, Bachelet left Australia and relocated to East Germany, where she was assigned an apartment in Am Stern, Potsdam by the German Democratic Republic. Her mother joined her a month later and lived separately in Leipzig. In October 1976, Bachelet began working at a communal clinic in the Babelsberg neighborhood. During this time, she met architect Jorge Leopoldo Dávalos Cartes, another Chilean exile and a member of the Socialist Party's Central Committee, and they married in 1977. In January 1978, Bachelet went to Leipzig to study German at the Herder Institute of Karl Marx University (now the University of Leipzig). She gave birth to her first child, Sebastián, in June 1978. She returned to Potsdam in September 1978 to continue her medical studies at the Humboldt University of Berlin, enrolling under the name "Verónica Michelle Dávalos". Five months later, she obtained authorization to return to Chile.

=== Return to Chile ===
After four years in exile, Bachelet returned to Chile in 1979 and settled in La Florida. Her medical school credits from East Germany were not recognized, so she had to restart her studies where she had left off. She graduated as physician-surgeon on 7 January 1983, but her request to work as a general practitioner in the public sector was denied by the military government on "political grounds". She subsequently received a scholarship from the Chilean Medical Chamber to specialize in pediatrics and public health at the Roberto del Río Children's Hospital (1983–86), completing the program with excellent grades but never sitting the final certification exam for financial reasons.

Bachelet also worked at PIDEE (Protection of Children Injured by States of Emergency Foundation), heading its Medical Department from 1986 to 1990. Following the birth of her second child, Francisca, in February 1984, she and Dávalos legally separated. Between 1985 and 1987, Bachelet had a romantic relationship with Alex Vojkovic Trier, an engineer and spokesman for the Manuel Rodríguez Patriotic Front, an armed group that later attempted to assassinate Pinochet in 1986; her degree of involvement with the Front, if any, has been disputed, and Bachelet has denied ever collaborating with it. The affair became a minor issue during her presidential campaign.

After Chile's transition to democracy in 1990, Bachelet worked as an epidemiologist for the Ministry of Health's West Santiago Health Service and later for the National AIDS Commission (Conasida), while consulting for the Pan-American Health Organization, the World Health Organization, and the Deutsche Gesellschaft für Technische Zusammenarbeit. During this period she began a relationship with fellow physician Aníbal Hernán Henríquez Marich, who fathered her third child, Sofía, born in December 1992; the relationship ended a few years later. From March 1994 to July 1997, Bachelet served as an adviser to the Ministry of Health under President Eduardo Frei Ruiz-Tagle. Driven by an interest in civil-military relations, Bachelet studied military strategy at the National Academy of Political and Strategic Studies (ANEPE) in 1996, finishing first in a class of twelve. This achievement earned her a presidential scholarship to continue her studies at the Inter-American Defense College in Washington, D.C., where she completed a Continental Defense Course in 1998, before returning to work as senior assistant to the Defense Minister and completing a master's degree in military science at the Chilean Army's War Academy.

== Early political career ==
=== Involvement in politics ===
In 1970, Bachelet joined the Socialist Youth and was an active supporter of the Popular Unity government. In the immediate aftermath of the coup, she and her mother worked as couriers for the underground Socialist Party directorate, trying to organize a resistance movement, before nearly all of their contacts were captured and disappeared.

In the second half of the 1980s, Bachelet became politically active again, joining protests against the dictatorship and building ties with the Vicaría de la Solidaridad, where her mother was also active. In 1995, she became a member of the Socialist Party's Central Committee and, from 1998 to 2000, an active member of its Political Commission. In 1996, she ran unsuccessfully for the mayorship of Las Condes, a wealthy Santiago suburb, coming fourth with 2.35% of the vote against incumbent Joaquín Lavín, who was re-elected with nearly 78%.

=== Minister of Health ===
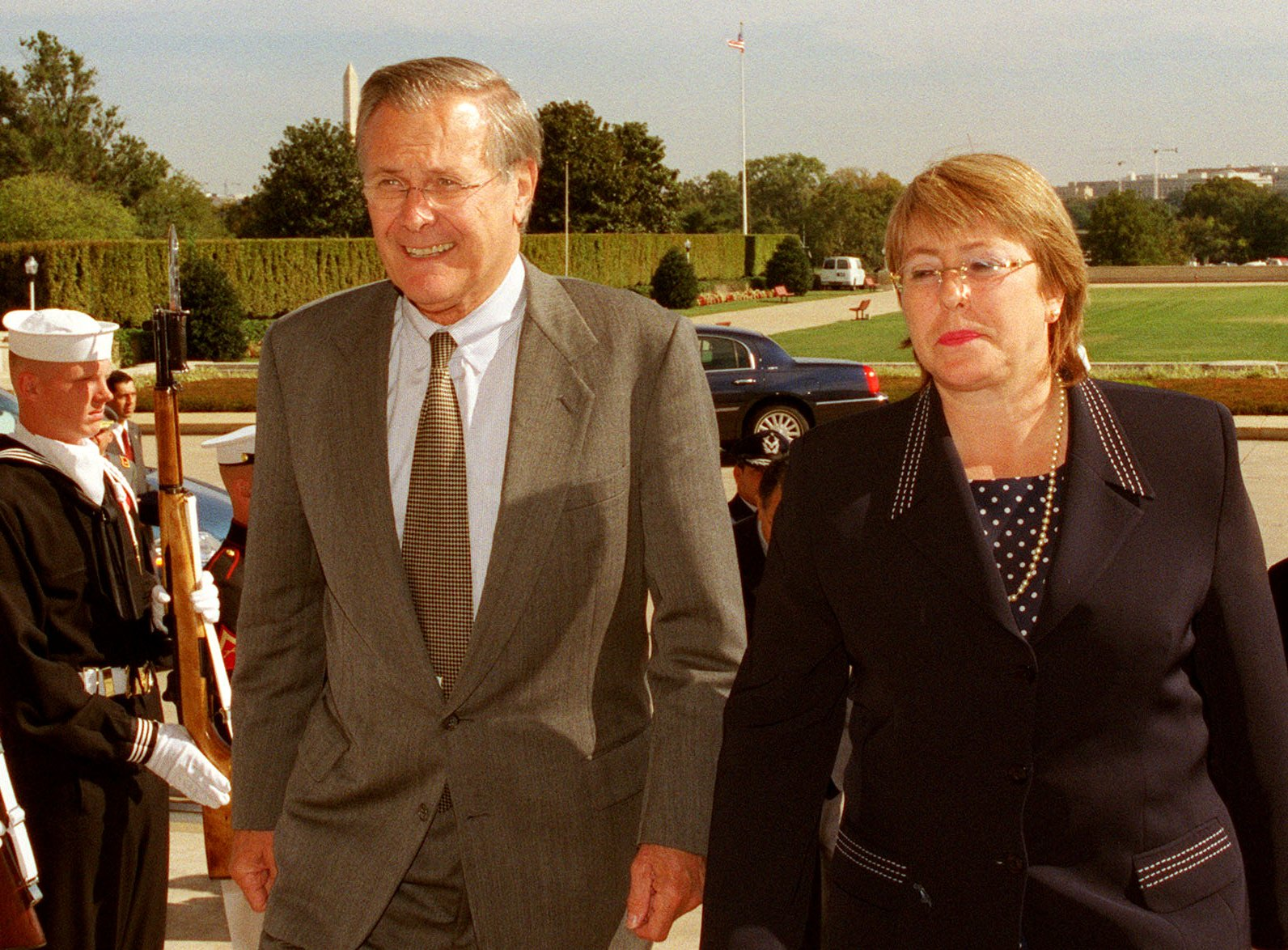
Bachelet, as Minister of Defense, meeting with U.S. Secretary of Defense Donald Rumsfeld in 2002

On 11 March 2000, largely unknown at the time, Bachelet was appointed Minister of Health by President Ricardo Lagos, the first woman to hold the post. She conducted an in-depth study of the public healthcare system that led to the creation of the AUGE plan a few years later. Tasked with eliminating waiting lists in the overburdened public hospital system within her first 100 days, she reduced them by 90% but was unable to eliminate them entirely, and offered her resignation, which Lagos rejected. Bachelet authorized the free distribution of the morning-after pill to victims of sexual abuse, sparking controversy with conservative groups and the Catholic Church; a legal challenge led the Supreme Court of Chile to ban the drug's distribution in 2001.

=== Minister of National Defense ===
On 7 January 2002, Bachelet was appointed Minister of National Defense, the first woman in Chile and Latin America, and one of the few in the world, to hold the post. She fostered reconciliatory gestures between the military and victims of the dictatorship, leading to General Juan Emilio Cheyre's 2003 declaration that the military would "never again" subvert democracy. She oversaw reforms of the military pension system and the modernization of the armed forces, including participation in international peacekeeping missions such as in Cyprus and Bosnia and Herzegovina, expanded the possibilities for women to join the military, and implemented the Ottawa Treaty's provisions for demining. One key moment cited as a factor in her rising popularity occurred in mid-2002, during flooding in northern Santiago, when she led a rescue operation atop an amphibious tank. By 2003 she was the government's best-evaluated official after the president himself, and by early 2004 was already a favorite for the following presidential election, ahead of both Lavín and Christian Democratic standard-bearer Soledad Alvear.

=== 2005–2006 presidential election ===
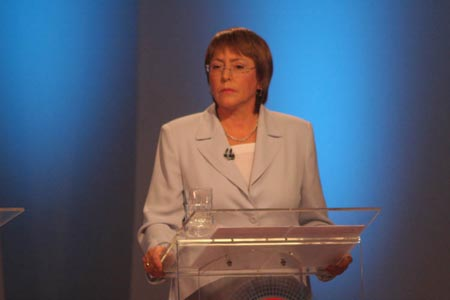
Bachelet during a television debate in 2005

By the end of 2004, Bachelet's surging popularity in opinion polls made her the only politician within the Coalition of Parties for Democracy («Concertación de los Partidos por la Democracia»; CPD) who was capable of defeating Joaquín Lavín in the presidential election. As a result, she was chosen as the Socialist Party's candidate for the presidency. Initially hesitant to accept the nomination, as it was never a goal of hers, she eventually agreed as she felt she could not let her supporters down. On 1 October of that year, she stepped down from her government position to fully focus on her campaign and to support the CPD in the municipal elections held later that month. On 28 January 2005 she was officially named the Socialist Party's presidential candidate. An open primary was scheduled for July 2005 to determine the CPD's sole presidential candidate, but it was canceled after Bachelet's only rival, Christian Democrat Soledad Alvear, a cabinet member in the first three CPD administrations, withdrew early due to a lack of support within her own party and in opinion polls.

Ahead of the primary that never took place, Bachelet and Alvear had already faced each other in a televised debate in Hualpén on 27 April 2005, held in a moderate tone without major controversy, in which Bachelet addressed her relationship with Alex Vojkovic during the 1980s and her alleged ties to armed opposition groups, information that had recently surfaced in the press. Polling at the time showed Bachelet was widely seen as having won the debate, outperforming Alvear on most of the topics discussed. Sebastián Piñera's entry into the race in May 2005, competing with Lavín for the right-wing vote, drew away much of Alvear's centrist support, leading her to withdraw her candidacy on 24 May 2005 and confirming Bachelet as the Concertación's sole candidate.

Bachelet's campaign, run under the slogan "Estoy contigo" ("I'm with you"), emphasized her approachability and combined continuity with the popular government of Ricardo Lagos with the promise of a shift toward a "citizens' government". Her platform rested on three pillars: strengthening social protection (including pension reform, expanded preschool education, guaranteed funding for higher education, an expanded AUGE health plan, and a new ministry of citizen security), promoting economic development (maintaining the structural surplus policy while boosting support for small and medium enterprises and creating a ministry of the environment), and democratizing the political system (automatic voluntary voter registration, ending the binomial electoral system, and promoting gender equality and anti-discrimination measures, while stopping short of endorsing same-sex marriage).

In the December 2005 election, Bachelet ran against three candidates: Sebastián Piñera from the center-right (RN), Joaquín Lavín from the right-wing (UDI), and Tomás Hirsch from the left (JPM). As predicted by opinion polls, she didn't receive the absolute majority needed to win the election outright, obtaining 46% of the vote. On 15 January 2006, she went on to face Piñera in the runoff election and won the presidency with 53.5% of the vote, becoming Chile's first female president and the first woman in Latin America to reach the presidency through a direct election without being the wife of a previous head of state or political leader. With her victory, she also became only the sixth woman to serve as a head of state in Latin American history, after Nicaragua's Violeta Chamorro, Argentina's María Estela Martínez de Perón, Bolivia's Lidia Gueiler Tejada, Ecuador's Rosalía Arteaga, and Panama's Mireya Moscoso, and the second to be democratically elected in South America after Guyana's Janet Jagan.

On 30 January 2006, Bachelet was declared President-elect by the Elections Certification Court (Tricel) and announced her cabinet, which, for the first time, was composed of an equal number of men and women, as promised during her campaign. To reflect the balance of power within the Coalition, Bachelet named seven ministers from the Christian Democrat Party (PDC), five from the Party for Democracy (PPD), four from the Socialist Party (PS), one from the Social Democrat Radical Party (PRSD), and three without party affiliation. In the days that followed, the nominations for subsecretaries and regional intendants observed the same principle of gender parity.

== First presidency (2006–2010) ==
The Bachelet Cabinet
Office	Name	Party	Term
President	Michelle Bachelet	PS	11 March 2006–11 March 2010
Interior	Andrés Zaldívar	DC	11 March 2006–14 July 2006
Belisario Velasco (resigned)	DC	14 July 2006–4 January 2008
Edmundo Pérez Yoma	DC	8 January 2008–11 March 2010
Foreign Affairs	Alejandro Foxley	DC	11 March 2006–13 March 2009
Mariano Fernández	DC	13 March 2009–11 March 2010
Defense	Vivianne Blanlot	PPD	11 March 2006–27 March 2007
José Goñi	PPD	27 March 2007–12 March 2009
Francisco Vidal	PPD	12 March 2009–11 March 2010
Finance	Andrés Velasco	Ind.	11 March 2006–11 March 2010
Gen. Sec. of the Presidency	Paulina Veloso	PS	11 March 2006–27 March 2007
José Antonio Viera-Gallo	PS	27 March 2007–10 March 2010
Gen. Sec. of Government	Ricardo Lagos Weber	PPD	11 March 2006–6 December 2007
Francisco Vidal	PPD	6 December 2007–12 March 2009
Carolina Tohá (resigned)	PPD	12 March 2009–14 December 2009
Pilar Armanet	PPD	18 December 2009–11 March 2010
Economy, Development & Tourism	Ingrid Antonijevic	PPD	11 March 2006–14 July 2006
Alejandro Ferreiro Yazigi	DC	14 July 2006–8 January 2008
Hugo Lavados	DC	8 January 2008–11 March 2010
Social Development & Family	Clarisa Hardy	PS	11 March 2006–8 January 2008
Paula Quintana	PS	8 January 2008–11 March 2010
Education	Martín Zilic	DC	11 March 2006–14 July 2006
Yasna Provoste (impeached)	DC	14 July 2006–3 April 2008
René Cortázar (caretaker)	DC	3 April 2008–18 April 2008
Mónica Jiménez	DC	18 April 2008–11 March 2010
Justice & Human; Rights	Isidro Solís	PRSD	11 March 2006–27 March 2007
Carlos Maldonado	PRSD	27 March 2007–11 March 2010
Labor & Social Welfare	Osvaldo Andrade (resigned)	PS	11 March 2006–10 December 2008
Claudia Serrano	PS	15 December 2008–11 March 2010
Public Works	Eduardo Bitrán	PPD	11 March 2006–11 January 2008
Sergio Bitar	PPD	11 January 2008–11 March 2010
Health	María Soledad Barría (resigned)	PS	11 March 2006–28 October 2008
Álvaro Erazo	PS	6 November 2008–11 March 2010
Housing & Urbanism	Patricia Poblete	DC	11 March 2006–11 March 2010
Agriculture	Álvaro Rojas	DC	11 March 2006–8 January 2008
Marigen Hornkohl	DC	8 January 2008–11 March 2010
Mining	Karen Poniachik	Ind.	11 March 2006–8 January 2008
Santiago González Larraín	PRSD	8 January 2008–11 March 2010
Transport & Telecommunications	Sergio Espejo	DC	11 March 2006–27 March 2007
René Cortázar	DC	27 March 2007–11 March 2010
National Assets	Romy Schmidt	PPD	11 March 2006–6 January 2010
Jacqueline Weinstein	PPD	6 January 2010–11 March 2010
Energy	Karen Poniachik	Ind.	11 March 2006–29 March 2007
Marcelo Tokman	PPD	29 March 2007–11 March 2010
Environment	Ana Lya Uriarte	PS	27 March 2007–11 March 2010
Women & Gender; Equality	Laura Albornoz	DC	11 March 2006–20 October 2009
Carmen Andrade	PS	20 October 2009–11 March 2010
Culture & the Arts	Paulina Urrutia	Ind.	11 March 2006–11 March 2010

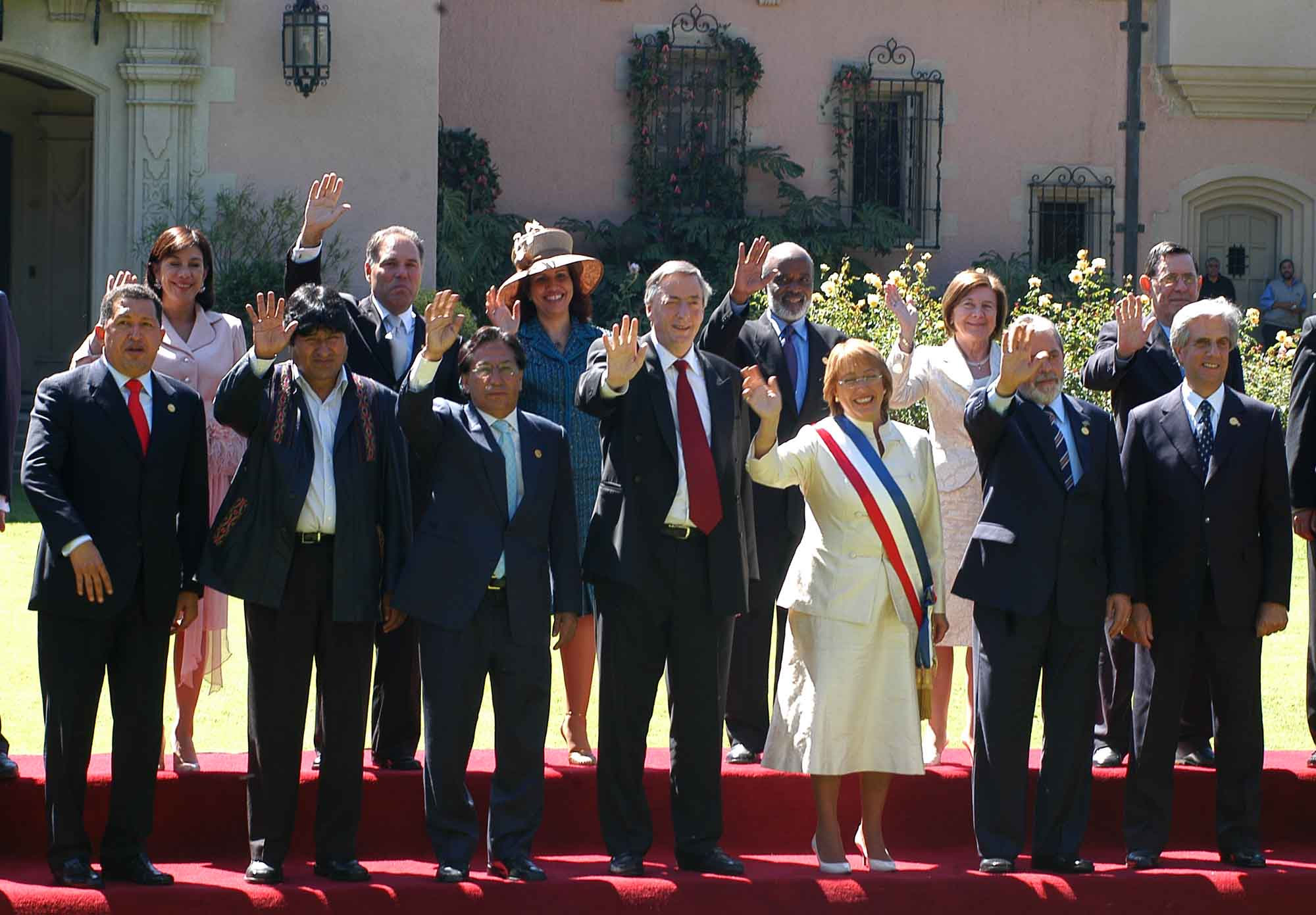
Bachelet waving with other leaders at the inauguration ceremony in Valparaíso

=== First days ===
Bachelet was sworn in as President of the Republic of Chile on 11 March 2006 in a ceremony held in a plenary session of the National Congress in Valparaíso attended by many foreign heads of states and delegates. Much of Bachelet's first three months as president were spent working on 36 measures she had promised during her campaign to implement during her first 100 days in office. They ranged from simple presidential decrees, such as providing free health care for older patients, to complex bills to reform the social security system and the electoral system. For her first state visit, Bachelet chose Argentina, arriving in Buenos Aires on 21 March. There she met with president Néstor Kirchner, with whom she signed strategic agreements on energy and infrastructure, including the possibility of launching a bidding process to operate the Transandine Railway.

=== Domestic affairs ===
==== Social policies ====
In March 2006 Bachelet created an advisory committee to reform the pension system, which was headed by former budget director Mario Marcel. The commission issued its final report in July 2006, and in March 2008 Bachelet signed the bill into law. The new legislation established a Basic Solidarity Pension (PBS) and a Solidarity Pension Contribution (APS), guaranteeing a minimum pension for the 60% poorest segment of the population, regardless of their contribution history. The reform also grants a bonus to female pensioners for every child born alive.

In October 2006 Bachelet enacted legislation to protect subcontracted employees, which would benefit an estimated 1.2 million workers. In June 2009 she introduced pay equality legislation, guaranteeing equal pay for equal work in the private sector, regardless of gender.

In September 2009 Bachelet signed the "Chile Grows with You" plan into law, providing comprehensive social services to vulnerable children from ages zero to six. That law also established a social welfare management framework called the "Intersectoral Social Protection System", made up of subsystems such as "Chile Solidario" and "Chile Grows with You".

Between 2008 and 2010 the Bachelet administration delivered a so-called "literary briefcase" (a box of books including encyclopedias, dictionaries, poetry works and books for both children and adults) to the 400,000 poorest families with children attending primary school from first to fourth grade.

In March 2009, Bachelet launched the "I Choose my PC" program, awarding free computers to poor seventh-graders with excellent academic performance attending government-subsidized schools. During 2009 and 2010 Bachelet delivered maternity packages to all babies born in public hospitals, which are about 80% of total births. In January 2010, Bachelet promulgated a law allowing the distribution of emergency contraception pills in public and private health centers, including to persons under 14, without parental consent. The law also requires high schools to add a sexual education program to their curriculum.

==== Student protests ====
Bachelet's first political crisis came in late April 2006, when massive high school student demonstrations – unseen in three decades – broke out throughout the country, demanding better public education. In June 2006, she sought to dampen the student protests by setting up an 81-member advisory committee, including education experts from all political backgrounds, representatives of ethnic groups, parents, teachers, students, school owners, university rectors, people from diverse religious denominations, etc. Its purpose was to propose changes to the country's educational system and serve as a forum to share ideas and views. The committee issued its final report in December 2006. In August 2009, she signed the education reform bill into law, which created two new regulatory bodies: a Superintendency on Education and a Quality Agency.

==== Transantiago fiasco ====
During her presidency Bachelet opened 18 new subway stations in Santiago, nine in 2006, one in 2009 and eight in 2010. In December 2009 Bachelet announced the construction of a new subway line in Santiago, to be operational by 2014 (the date was later changed to mid-2016).

In February 2007 Santiago's transport system was radically altered with the introduction of Transantiago, designed under the previous administration. The system was nearly unanimously condemned by the media, the users and the opposition, significantly damaging her popularity, and leading to the sacking of her Transport minister. On her decision not to abort the plan's start, she said in April 2007 she was given erroneous information which caused her to act against her "instincts".

In September 2008, Chile's Constitutional Court declared a US$400 million loan by the Inter-American Development Bank to fund the transport system unconstitutional. Bachelet – who had been forced to ask for the loan after Congress had refused to approve funds for the beleaguered program in November 2007 – made use of an emergency clause in the Constitution that grants funds equivalent to 2% of the fiscal budget. In November 2008, she invoked the emergency clause again after Congress denied once again funds for the system for 2009.

==== 2010 earthquake ====
On 27 February 2010, during the last week of summer vacations and less than two weeks before Bachelet's term was set to expire, Chile was struck by an 8.8-magnitude earthquake that killed over 500 people and caused widespread damage, including the collapse of apartment buildings and bridges and tsunamis that destroyed fishing villages. Bachelet and the government faced criticism for their slow response to the disaster, which hit on a Saturday at 3:34 am and left most of the country without electricity, phone, and Internet access. Bachelet declared a state of catastrophe and, on Sunday afternoon, sent military troops to the most affected areas in an effort to quell instances of looting and arson. She also imposed night curfews in the most affected cities, but was criticized for not deploying the troops quickly enough.

==== Human rights ====
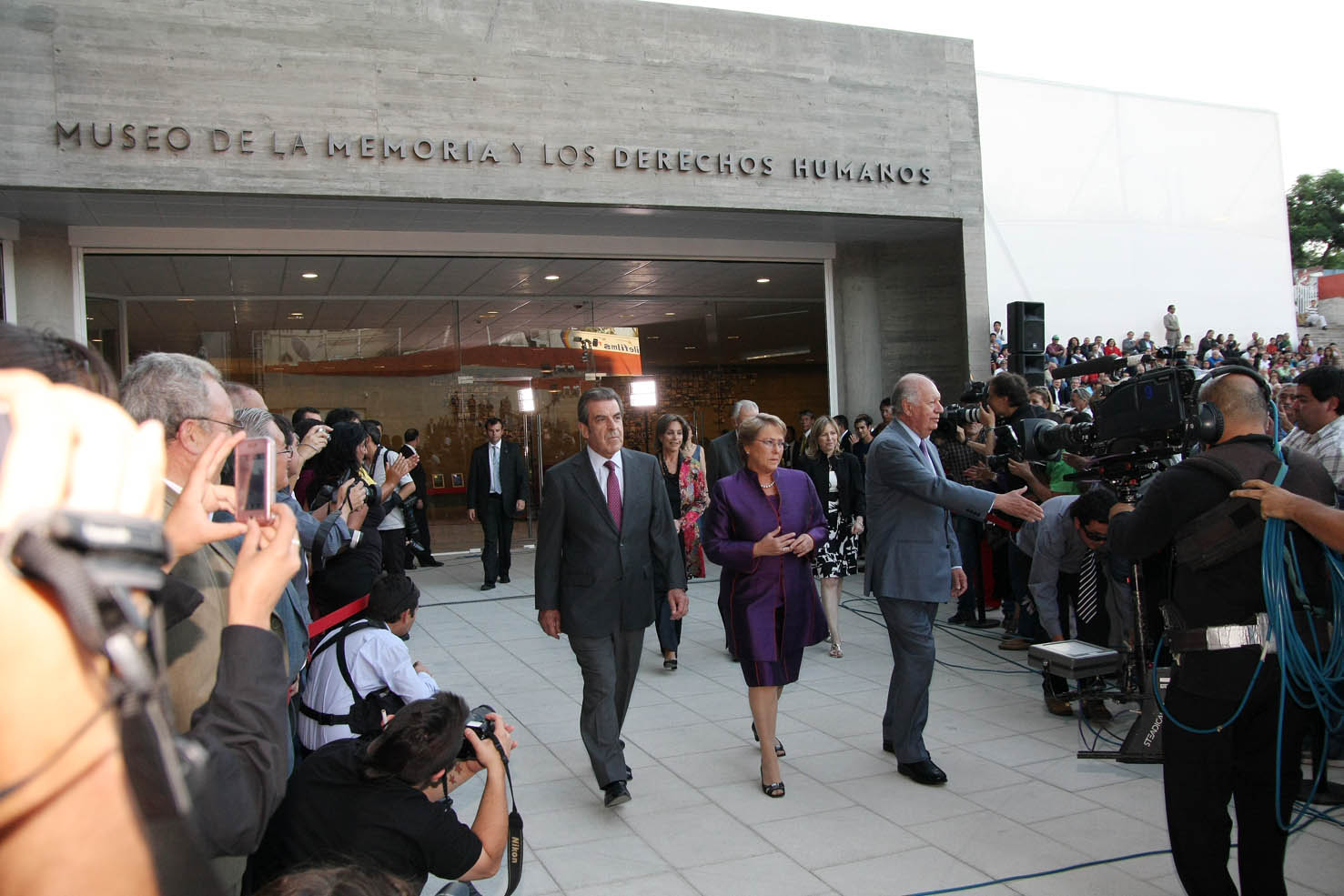
Bachelet with former presidents Eduardo Frei and Ricardo Lagos during the inauguration of the Museum of Memory and Human Rights in January 2010

In January 2010 Bachelet opened the Museum of Memory and Human Rights in Santiago, documenting the horrors of Pinochet's 16 1/2-year dictatorship. In November she promulgated a law (submitted to Congress during the previous administration) creating the National Institute for Human Rights, with the goal of protecting and promoting human rights in the country. The law also allowed for the reopening of the Rettig and Valech commissions for 18 months. She used her power as president to send a bill to legalize gay marriages, and sponsored a reproductive rights bill.

On 10 August 2018 the outgoing UN High Commissioner for Human Rights Zeid Ra'ad Al Hussein warmly welcomed the UN General Assembly's appointment of Michelle Bachelet to succeed him. He said that "She has all the attributes – courage, perseverance, passion, and a deep commitment to human rights".

==== Other legislation passed ====
In August 2008, Bachelet signed a freedom of information bill into law, which became effective in April 2009.

In January 2010, Bachelet enacted a law creating the Ministry for the Environment. The new legislation also created the Environmental Evaluation Service and the Superintendency for the Environment.

Half of the ministries in her first government were occupied by women; in her successor's team, Sebastián Piñera, 18% were.

==== Economy ====
Bachelet was widely credited for resisting calls from politicians within her own coalition to spend the country's huge copper revenues to close the income gap. Instead in 2007 she created the Economic and Social Stabilization Fund, a sovereign wealth fund which accumulates fiscal surpluses above 1% of GDP. This allowed her to finance new social policies and provide economic stimulus packages when the 2008 financial crisis hit the country. Chile's rising copper revenues had by mid-2006 produced over US$6 billion in fiscal surplus, prompting criticism even from within her own governing coalition that the funds should instead be spent on health and education; nonetheless, the government's caution allowed it to launch, in January 2009, an unprecedented fiscal stimulus package worth more than US$4 billion in response to the international financial crisis, including public works spending, tax relief measures, direct investment in the state copper company CODELCO, and a bonus payment to low-income families.

During her four years in office, the economy grew at an average rate of 3.3% per year (2.3% on per capita basis), reaching a high of 5.7% in 2006 and a low of −1.0% in 2009 due to the 2008 financial crisis. The real minimum wage increased an average of 2% per year, the lowest increase of any president since 1990, while unemployment hovered between 7 and 8% for the first three years, then rose to nearly 11% during 2009. Inflation averaged 4.5% per year, reaching close to 9% in 2008 due to rising food prices. Absolute poverty fell from 13.7% in November 2006 to 11.5% in November 2009.

==== Political issues ====
Bachelet began her term with an unprecedented absolute majority in both chambers of Congress. Prior to the elimination of appointed senators in the 2005 constitutional reforms, the CPD had never held a majority in the Senate. However, she was soon met with internal opposition from several discontented lawmakers in both chambers of Congress, known as díscolos ("disobedient", "ungovernable"). This opposition jeopardized the coalition's fragile and historic congressional majority on a number of key executive-sponsored bills during much of her first two years in office and forced Bachelet to negotiate with a right-wing opposition that she perceived as "obstructionist". By 2007, the CPD had lost its absolute majority in both chambers of Congress as several senators and deputies from the coalition became independent.

In December 2006, Pinochet died. Bachelet decided not to grant him a state funeral, an honour bestowed upon constitutionally elected Chilean presidents, but a military funeral as former commander-in-chief of the Army appointed by President Salvador Allende. She also refused to declare an official national day of mourning, but did authorize flags at military barracks to fly at half staff. Pinochet's coffin was also allowed to be draped in a Chilean flag. Bachelet did not attend his funeral, saying it would be "a violation of [her] conscience", and sent Defense Minister Vivianne Blanlot instead.

In April 2008, Bachelet's Education Minister, Yasna Provoste, was impeached by Congress for her handling of a scandal involving mismanagement of school subsidies. Her conviction was the first for a sitting minister in 36 years.

=== Foreign relations ===
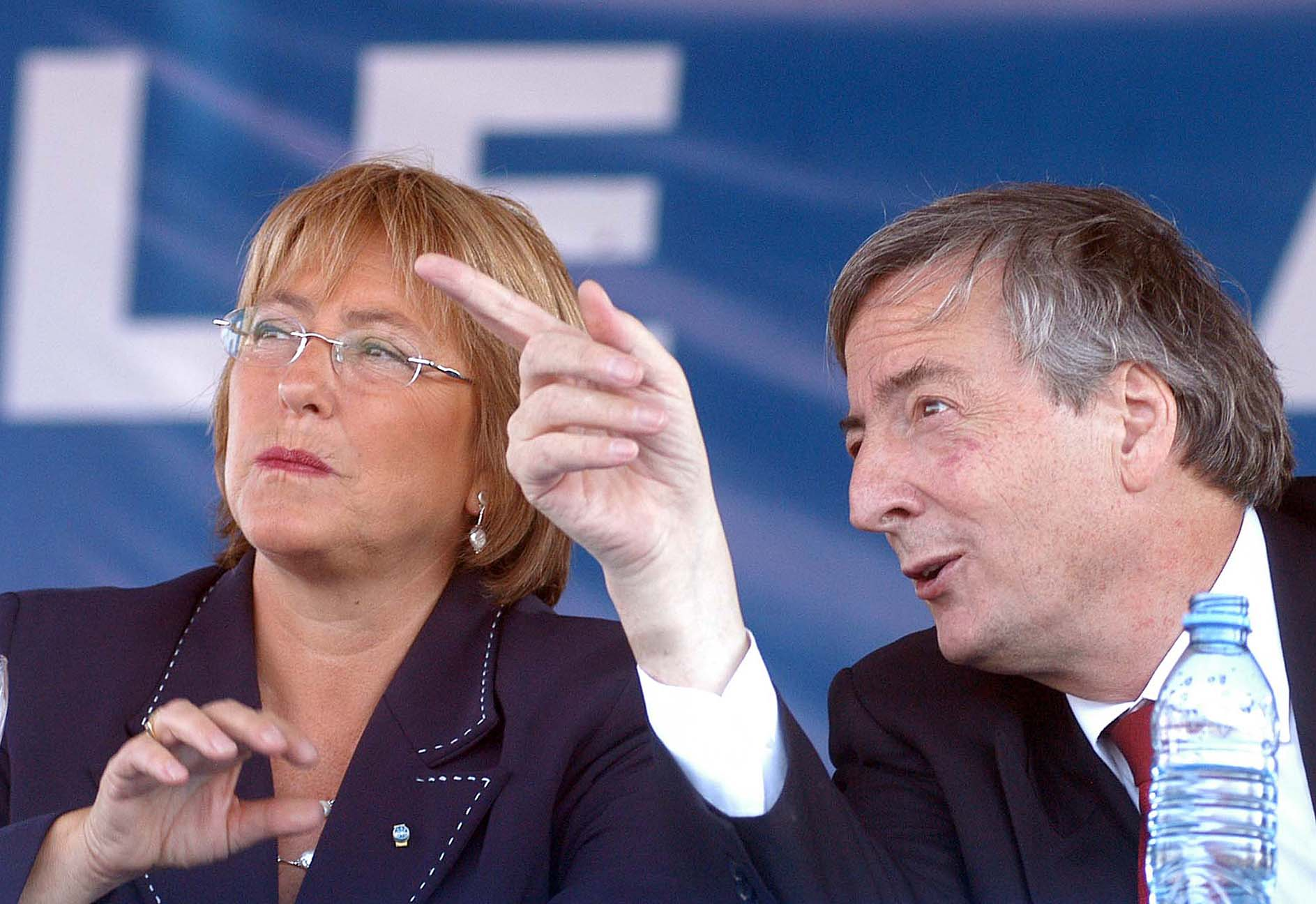
Bachelet with former Argentine president Néstor Kirchner

==== Argentina ====
During her first year in office Bachelet faced continuing problems from neighbors Argentina and Peru. In July 2006, she sent a letter of protest to Argentine president Néstor Kirchner after his government issued a decree increasing export tariffs on natural gas to Chile, which was considered by Bachelet to be a violation of a tacit bilateral agreement.

==== Peru ====
In early 2007, Peru accused Chile of unilaterally redefining their shared sea boundary in a section of a law passed by Congress that detailed the borders of the new administrative region of Arica and Parinacota. The impasse was resolved by the Chilean Constitutional Tribunal, which declared that section unconstitutional. In March 2007, the Chilean state-owned and independent public broadcaster Televisión Nacional de Chile (TVN) canceled the broadcast of a documentary about the War of the Pacific after a cautionary call was made to the stations' board of directors by Chilean Foreign Relations Minister Alejandro Foxley, apparently acting on demands made by the Peruvian ambassador to Chile; the show was finally broadcast in late May of that year. In August 2007 the Chilean government filed a formal diplomatic protest with Peru and summoned home its ambassador after Peru published an official map claiming a part of the Pacific Ocean that Chile considers its sovereign territory. Peru said this was just another step in its plans to bring the dispute to the International Court of Justice in The Hague. In January 2008 Peru asked the court to consider the dispute, prompting Bachelet to summon home the Chilean ambassador in Lima for consultations. Rather than seek out confrontation, Bachelet's diplomatic instincts during this period generally leaned toward avoiding overt escalation with Bolivia as well; when reports emerged that her government might be open to discussing Bolivia's long-standing demand for sovereign access to the Pacific, Foreign Minister Foxley rejected the suggestion and reaffirmed that Chile would not question the inviolability of existing treaties, particularly the 1904 Treaty of Peace and Friendship between the two countries.

==== UN voting deadlock ====
The United Nations Security Council election held on 16 October 2006, which saw a deadlock between Venezuela and Guatemala for the two-year, non-permanent Latin American and Caribbean seat on the Security Council, developed into a significant ideological issue in Chile and was viewed as a test for Bachelet. The governing coalition was split, with the Socialists supporting Venezuela's bid and the Christian Democrats strongly opposing it. The day before the vote, the president announced through her spokesman that Chile would abstain, citing the lack of regional consensus on a single candidate, ending months of speculation. In March 2007, Chile's ambassador to Venezuela, Claudio Huepe, said in an interview with teleSUR that Bachelet personally told him that she had initially intended to vote for Venezuela but then "there were a series of circumstances that forced me to abstain". The government quickly recalled Huepe and accepted his resignation.

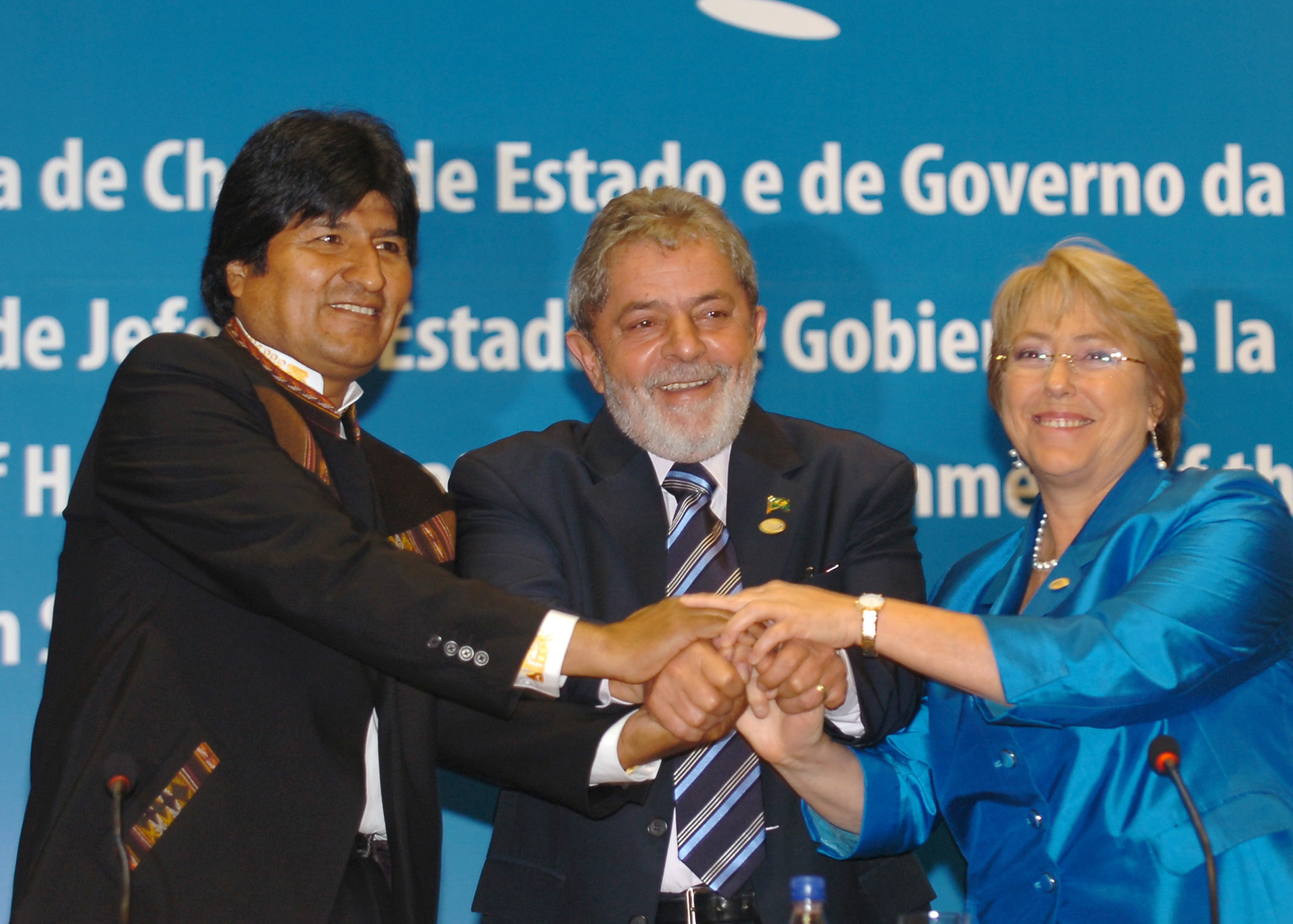
Bachelet with Evo Morales and Lula da Silva at a Union of South American Nations summit in 2008

==== Unasur ====
In May 2008, Bachelet became the first President pro tempore of the Union of South American Nations (Unasur) and in September she called for an urgent summit after Bolivian President Evo Morales warned of a possible coup attempt against him. The presidents of Bolivia, Ecuador, Uruguay, Argentina, Paraguay, Brazil and Colombia, and the Secretary-General of the Organization of American States, met with Bachelet at the La Moneda Palace in Santiago, where they agreed to send two commissions to Bolivia: one to mediate between the executive and the opposition, and another to investigate the killings in Pando Department.

==== Cuba visit ====
In February 2009, Bachelet visited Cuba and met with Fidel Castro. There she urged the United States to put an end to the embargo. No Chilean head of state had visited the country in 37 years. Despite petitions from the Christian Democratic Party of her own governing coalition, and of the opposition parties, Bachelet did not meet with Cuban dissidents during her visit. Soon after the meeting, Castro wrote that the "fascist and vengeful Chilean oligarchy is the same which more than 100 years ago robbed Bolivia of its access to the Pacific and of copper-rich lands in a humiliating war".

==== Progressive Leaders summit ====
In March 2009, Bachelet hosted in Viña del Mar the "Progressive Leaders Summit", meeting with U.S. Vice President Joe Biden, British Prime Minister Gordon Brown, Spanish Prime Minister José Luis Rodríguez Zapatero and presidents Tabaré Vázquez of Uruguay, Luiz Inácio Lula da Silva of Brazil and Cristina Fernández de Kirchner of Argentina. The meeting garnered some media interest because it took place six days before the highly anticipated G-20 Summit in London.

==== Trade ====
Continuing the coalition's free-trade strategy, in August 2006 Bachelet promulgated a free trade agreement with the People's Republic of China (signed under the previous administration of Ricardo Lagos), the first Chinese free-trade agreement with a Latin American nation; similar deals with Japan and India were promulgated in August 2007. In October 2006, Bachelet promulgated a multilateral trade deal with New Zealand, Singapore and Brunei, the Trans-Pacific Strategic Economic Partnership (P4), also signed under Lagos's presidency. She held free-trade talks with other countries, including Australia, Vietnam, Turkey and Malaysia. Regionally, she signed bilateral free trade agreements with Panama, Peru and Colombia.

==== Other policies ====
In October 2007, Bachelet granted amnesty to undocumented migrants from other Latin American countries. The measure was expected to benefit around 15,000 Peruvians and 2,000 Bolivians. In December 2007 she signed in Bolivia a trilateral agreement with the presidents of Brazil and Bolivia to complete and improve a 4,700 km road to connect the Atlantic and Pacific Oceans, via Arica and Iquique in Chile and Santos in Brazil. In May 2008, following months of intense lobbying, Chile was elected as member of the United Nations Human Rights Council, obtaining the largest vote among Latin American countries.

In December 2009 Chile became the first country in South America, and the second in Latin America after Mexico, to receive an invitation to join the Organisation for Economic Co-operation and Development (OECD). Bachelet signed the accession agreement in January 2010, but it formally became a member in May 2010, after she had left office.

=== Popularity ===
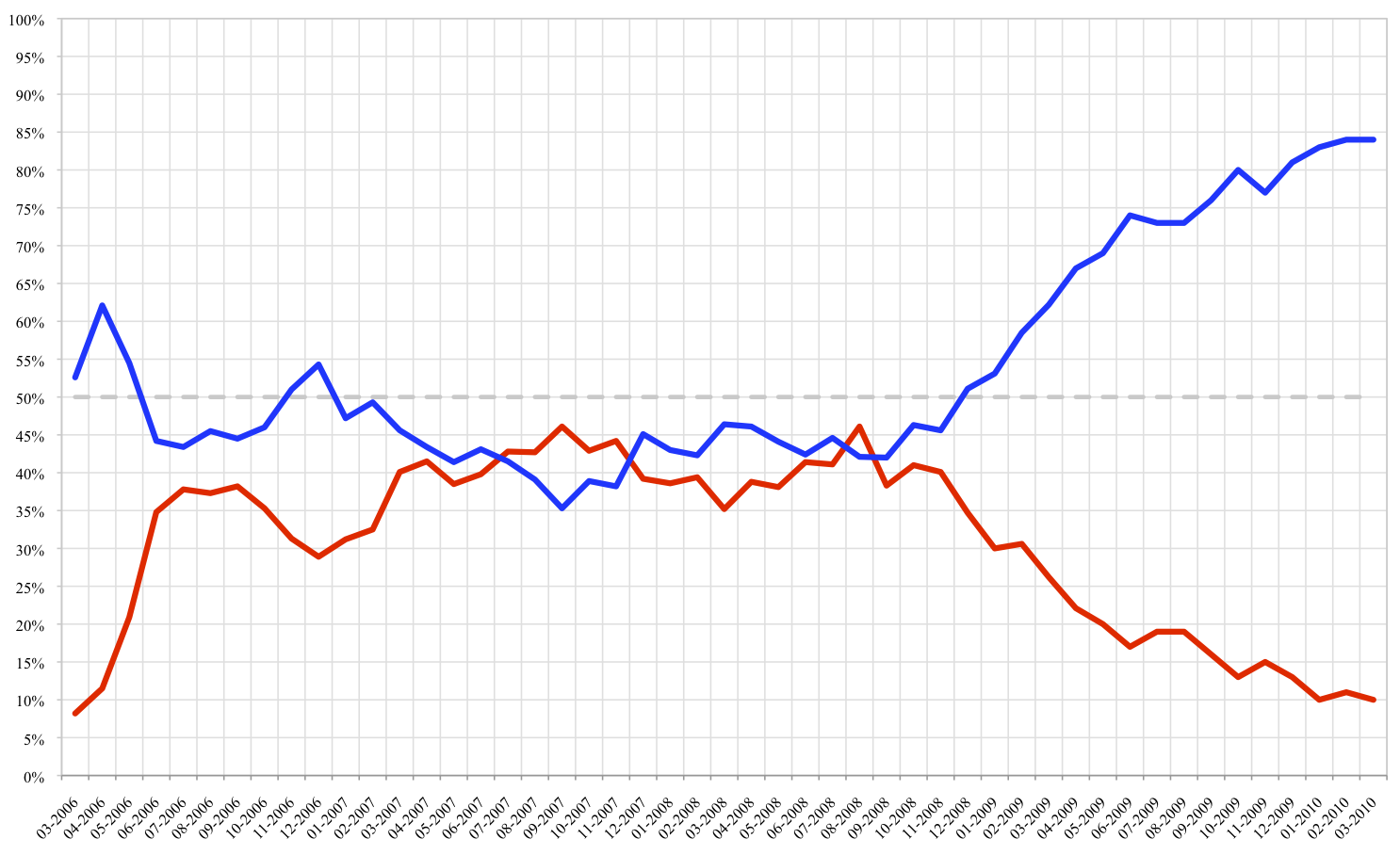
Job-approval ratings (blue is approval; red is disapproval)

Bachelet enjoyed an approval rating above 50% for her first three months in office, during the so-called "honeymoon period". Her popularity fell during the student protests that year, hovering in the mid-40s. In July she had a disastrous public relations incident when a group of residents she was visiting in the southern city of Chiguayante who were affected by a landslide berated her publicly on television, accusing her of using their tragedy to boost her falling popularity. One woman demanded that she leave the scene so rescue efforts could continue. In July, after only four months in office, Bachelet was forced to reshuffle her cabinet, in what was the fastest ministerial adjustment since 1990.

Bachelet's popularity dipped further in her second year, reaching a low of 35% approval, 46% disapproval in September 2007. This fall was mainly attributed to the Transantiago fiasco. That same month she had a second negative incident when a group of earthquake and tsunami victims she was visiting in the southern region of Aisén received her bearing black flags and accused her of showing up late. The city mayor, who told Bachelet to "go to hell", later apologized. Over the following 12 months, however, Bachelet's approval ratings did not improve.

At the onset of the 2008 financial crisis, in September 2008, Bachelet's popularity was at 42%, but gradually her job approval ratings began to rise. When she left office in March 2010 her popular support was at a record 84%, according to conservative polling institute Adimark GfK.

The Chilean Constitution does not allow a president to serve two consecutive terms and Bachelet endorsed Christian Democratic Party candidate Eduardo Frei Ruiz-Tagle for the December 2009 election.

== Political interregnum ==
In April 2010, Bachelet inaugurated her own think-tank, "Fundación Dialoga". Its headquarters are located in Providencia, a suburb of Santiago.

Bachelet is a member of the Club of Madrid, the world's largest forum of former heads of state and government. Since 2010 she has also been a member of the Inter-American Dialogue, the leading think tank on Western Hemisphere relations and affairs, and served as the organization's co-chair.

=== UN Women ===
On 14 September 2010, Bachelet was appointed head of the newly created United Nations body UN Women by UN Secretary-General Ban Ki-moon, serving as Under-Secretary-General of the United Nations in that capacity. She took office on 19 September 2010. Under her leadership, UN Women helped secure agreement on eliminating and preventing all forms of violence against women and girls at the 57th session of the Commission on the Status of Women. On 15 March 2013 she announced her resignation.

=== 2013 presidential election ===
On 27 March 2013, Bachelet announced that she would seek a second term as President of Chile in the 2013 elections. The well-respected CEP released a poll in May 2012 suggesting that 51% of voters wished to see her become the next president, far ahead of any other would-be candidate. Bachelet had declined for most of Piñera's term to comment on a possible candidacy, but in the days after resigning from UN Women she returned to Chile on 27 March 2013, greeted by supporters at Arturo Merino Benítez International Airport, and confirmed her candidacy that same night at a public event in El Bosque.

On 30 June 2013, Bachelet became the Nueva Mayoría's candidate for president after she won a four-way primary election with the support of five center and left parties (PS, PPD, PC, IC, MAS) and 73% of the vote. Her campaign, run under the slogan "Yo quiero Chile" ("I want Chile"), centered on drafting a new constitution, establishing free higher education, and a tax reform to finance it, without dwelling on details that could fracture her broad base of support; it also sought the support of those who had taken part in the 2011–13 Chilean student protests against the Piñera government. On 7 October 2013, Bachelet presented a document listing 50 measures to be carried out in the first hundred days of a prospective government, and on 27 October unveiled her full platform, which proposed free education at all levels within six years, an end to for-profit schooling, reform of the binomial electoral system, a tax reform, and the drafting of a new constitution, among other measures.

In the 17 November 2013 presidential election, Bachelet fell short of the absolute majority needed for an outright win. In the runoff election, held on 15 December of that year, she beat former senator and Minister of Labor Evelyn Matthei with over 62% of the vote; turnout was significantly lower than in the first round. She became the first Chilean president to be re-elected to a second, non-consecutive term. Bachelet's proclamation as President-elect for the 2014–2018 term was confirmed by the Elections Certification Court (Tricel) on 10 January 2014.

==== Alleged links to the Odebrecht case ====
Léo Pinheiro, a former executive of the OAS Group convicted of corruption as part of Brazil's Lava Jato investigation, told Brazilian prosecutors that he allegedly funneled money to Bachelet's 2013 campaign at the request of then-Brazilian President Lula da Silva. Bachelet denied any connection, stating she had "never had a link with OAS, nor with any other company". When Chilean prosecutor Ximena Chong traveled to Brazil in March 2017 to question Pinheiro, he invoked his right to remain silent.

== Second presidency (2014–2018) ==
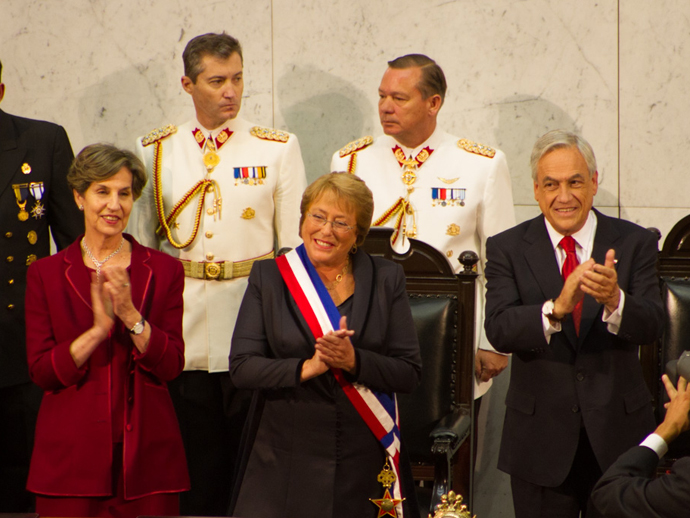
Senate President Isabel Allende, Bachelet and former president Sebastián Piñera on inauguration day at the National Congress, 11 March 2014

The Bachelet Cabinet
Office	Name	Party	Term
President	Michelle Bachelet	PS	11 March 2014–11 March 2018
Interior	Rodrigo Peñailillo	PPD	11 March 2014–11 May 2015
Jorge Burgos	PDC	11 May 2015–8 June 2016
Mario Fernández Baeza	PDC	8 June 2016–11 March 2018
Foreign Affairs	Heraldo Muñoz	PPD	11 March 2014–11 March 2018
Defense	Jorge Burgos	PDC	11 March 2014–11 May 2015
José Antonio Gómez	PRSD	11 May 2015–11 March 2018
Finance	Alberto Arenas	PS	11 March 2014–11 May 2015
Rodrigo Valdés	PPD	11 May 2015–31 August 2017
Nicolás Eyzaguirre	PPD	31 August 2017–11 March 2018
Gen. Sec. of the Presidency	Ximena Rincón	PDC	11 March 2014–11 May 2015
Jorge Insunza (resigned)	PPD	11 May 2015–7 June 2015
Patricia Silva (caretaker)	PS	7 June 2015–27 June 2015
Nicolás Eyzaguirre	PPD	27 June 2015–31 August 2017
Gabriel de la Fuente	PS	31 August 2017–11 March 2018
Gen. Sec. of Government	Álvaro Elizalde	PS	11 March 2014–11 May 2015
Marcelo Díaz	PS	11 May 2015–18 November 2016
Paula Narváez	PS	18 November 2016–11 March 2018
Economy, Development & Tourism	Luis Felipe Céspedes	PDC	11 March 2014–11 March 2018
Social Development & Family	Fernanda Villegas	PS	11 March 2014–11 May 2015
Marcos Barraza	PC	11 May 2015–11 March 2018
Education	Nicolás Eyzaguirre	PPD	11 March 2014–27 June 2015
Adriana Delpiano	PPD	27 June 2015–11 March 2018
Justice & Human; Rights	José Antonio Gómez	PRSD	11 March 2014–11 May 2015
Javiera Blanco	Ind.	11 May 2015–19 October 2016
Jaime Campos	PRSD	19 October 2016–11 March 2018
Labor & Social Welfare	Javiera Blanco	Ind.	11 March 2014–11 May 2015
Ximena Rincón	PDC	11 May 2015–18 November 2016
Alejandra Krauss	PDC	18 November 2016–11 March 2018
Public Works	Alberto Undurraga	PDC	11 March 2014–11 March 2018
Health	Helia Molina (resigned)	PPD	11 March 2014–30 December 2014
Jaime Burrows (caretaker)	PDC	30 December 2014–23 January 2015
Carmen Castillo	Ind.	23 January 2015–11 March 2018
Housing & Urbanism	Paulina Saball	PPD	11 March 2014–11 March 2018
Agriculture	Carlos Furche	PS	11 March 2014–11 March 2018
Mining	Aurora Williams	PRSD	11 March 2014–11 March 2018
Transport & Telecommunications	Andrés Gómez-Lobo	PPD	11 March 2014–14 March 2017
Paola Tapia	PDC	14 March 2017–11 March 2018
National Assets	Víctor Osorio Reyes	IC	11 March 2014–19 October 2016
Nivia Palma	IC	19 October 2016–11 March 2018
Energy	Máximo Pacheco	PS	11 March 2014–19 October 2016
Andrés Rebolledo	PS	19 October 2016–11 March 2018
Environment	Pablo Badenier	PDC	11 March 2014–20 March 2017
Marcelo Mena	Ind.	20 March 2017–11 March 2018
Women & Gender; Equality	Claudia Pascual	PC	11 March 2014–11 March 2018
Culture & the Arts	Claudia Barattini	Ind.	11 March 2014–11 May 2015
Ernesto Ottone	Ind.	11 May 2015–11 March 2018
Sports	Natalia Riffo	MAS	11 March 2014–18 November 2016
Pablo Squella	Ind.	18 November 2016–11 March 2018

Bachelet was sworn in as President of the Republic of Chile for her second term on 11 March 2014, at the National Congress in Valparaíso. Isabel Allende, the daughter of former President Salvador Allende and newly elected President of the Senate, administered the affirmation of office to Bachelet, marking the first time in the country's history that both parties involved were women. Her second government pursued an ambitious and progressive program of structural reforms.

=== Domestic policies ===
==== Education reform ====
Among Bachelet's main campaign promises for the 2013 election was the introduction of free university education in Chile and the end of profit-making educational institutions, as a response to the 2011–13 Chilean student protests. The intention was that revenue from the increase in corporate tax rate by 2017 would be used to fund free education. The proposals were criticized and quickly became unpopular due to the opposition from students who felt that the proposals did not go far enough in removing profit making. Opposition parties, lower middle class voters and certain members of Bachelet's Nueva Mayoría coalition attacked the proposals as the law that would prevent individuals from earning profits on public resources would not address making improvements in quality of education.

In 2015, the Chile Constitutional Court rejected large portions of Bachelet's plan to offer free college education to half of the nation's poorest students on grounds that requiring them to attend certain schools participating in the program could be considered discrimination. However, what remained of the plan allowed Bachelet to send 200,000 students from low-income families to college free of cost.

In January 2018, the Chilean Senate passed a law guaranteeing free education which was supported by conservative opposition parties as well, allowing the poorest 60% of students to study for free and doubled state funding for public universities. The new legislation created a higher education Superintendent empowered to supervise and penalize institutions which do not provide quality of education or have for-profit operations. Alongside the free-tuition reform, Bachelet's government moved to "de-municipalize" public schooling, transferring control of public schools away from municipal governments and abolishing school co-payments.

==== Tax reform ====
In September 2014, the Chilean Congress passed Bachelet's tax reform proposal which aimed to increase revenue by 3% of gross domestic product. Measures included in the reform were:

- increased corporate tax rate from 20% to 25% or 27%
- the maximum tax bracket for personal income tax lowered to 35 percent from 40 percent starting in 2018
- increased excise taxes for sweetened beverages, alcohol and tobacco
- "Green" taxes including a tax on carbon emissions for thermoelectric plants bigger than 50 MW and a tax on the import of diesel vehicles with higher cylinder capacity, excluding work vehicles
- measures against tax evasion

Critics blamed tax reforms for complexity driving away investment and for the slowdown of the Chilean economy during Bachelet's second period in office. However, Bachelet's supporters argue that falling copper prices were more to blame for the economic slowdown. They argue that economic forecasts of faster growth in conjunction with rising copper prices and exports from 2018 onwards (after Bachelet's term) suggest that the tax reforms did not negatively affect the economy. Others, such as MIT-trained economist and academic Klaus Schmidt-Hebbel, have found that Chile's overall terms of trade under Bachelet's second term worsened only marginally compared to those of her predecessor Sebastián Piñera, due in part to a lower cost of key imports like petroleum. Consequently, he concludes that Bachelet's reforms and governance likely were instrumental in causing a period of dampened growth throughout her presidency. Indeed, by 2015 public disapproval of Bachelet's economic management had reached 72%, reflecting the broader slowdown that took hold during her second term.

==== Environmental policy ====
After Easter Island's Rapa Nui inhabitants voted 73% in favor of establishing a conservation zone, Michelle Bachelet designated a new 720,000 square kilometer protection area in September 2017, protecting at least 142 endemic marine species, including 27 threatened with extinction. Five new national parks in the Patagonia region were created under a presidential decree, covering 10 million acres in January 2018, including 1 million acres of land contributed by conservationist Kris Tompkins. On 9 March 2018, Bachelet created nine marine reserves to protect biodiversity with her final presidential decree, increasing the area of the sea under state protection from 4.2 percent to 42.4 percent. The measure is expected to benefit marine life in approximately 1.4 million square kilometers.

==== Civil unions and same-sex marriage ====
When Michelle Bachelet again took office of President in March 2014, she made passing Piñera's civil union bill a priority. The name of the bill was changed to Civil Union Pact (Pacto de Unión Civil) on 17 December, and Congress reiterated their intention to hold the final vote by January 2015. On 6 January 2015, a provision recognizing foreign marriages as civil unions was approved in the Constitutional Committee while the child adoption clause was turned down. The bill went to a final vote before both the Senate and the Chamber of Deputies as it was amended. On 13 January, the full Chamber of Deputies reinserted the adoption provision. On 20 January 2015, the Chamber approved the bill on a vote of 86 to 23 with 2 abstentions. On 27 January, the Senate rejected all the Chamber's amendments, so the bill was headed to the joint committee of both houses. The committee reached the agreement in regard to the text of the bill and changed its name to Civil Union Agreement (Acuerdo de Unión Civil) the same day. The bill was passed in both houses on 28 January 2015. Several lawmakers asked the Chilean Constitutional Court to verify the bill's constitutionality, which was upheld by the court in a ruling released on 6 April 2015. The bill was signed into law by President Bachelet on 13 April 2015. It was published in the Official Gazette on 21 April 2015 and took effect on 22 October 2015.

Chile's civil union provisions enable couples to claim pension benefits and inherit property if their civil partner dies as well as more easily co-own property and make medical decisions for one another. The Government estimated at the time of the law going into effect that some two million Chilean couples cohabiting could have their unions legally recognized. In the day following the law going into effect, approximately 1,600 couples signed up to register their unions.

On 1 December 2016, the Chamber of Deputies unanimously approved (except for 6 abstentions) a bill to give couples who enter in a civil union five days off, like what married couples have. The bill was approved by the Senate in October 2017, in a unanimous 15–0 vote.

==== Women's rights and abortion ====
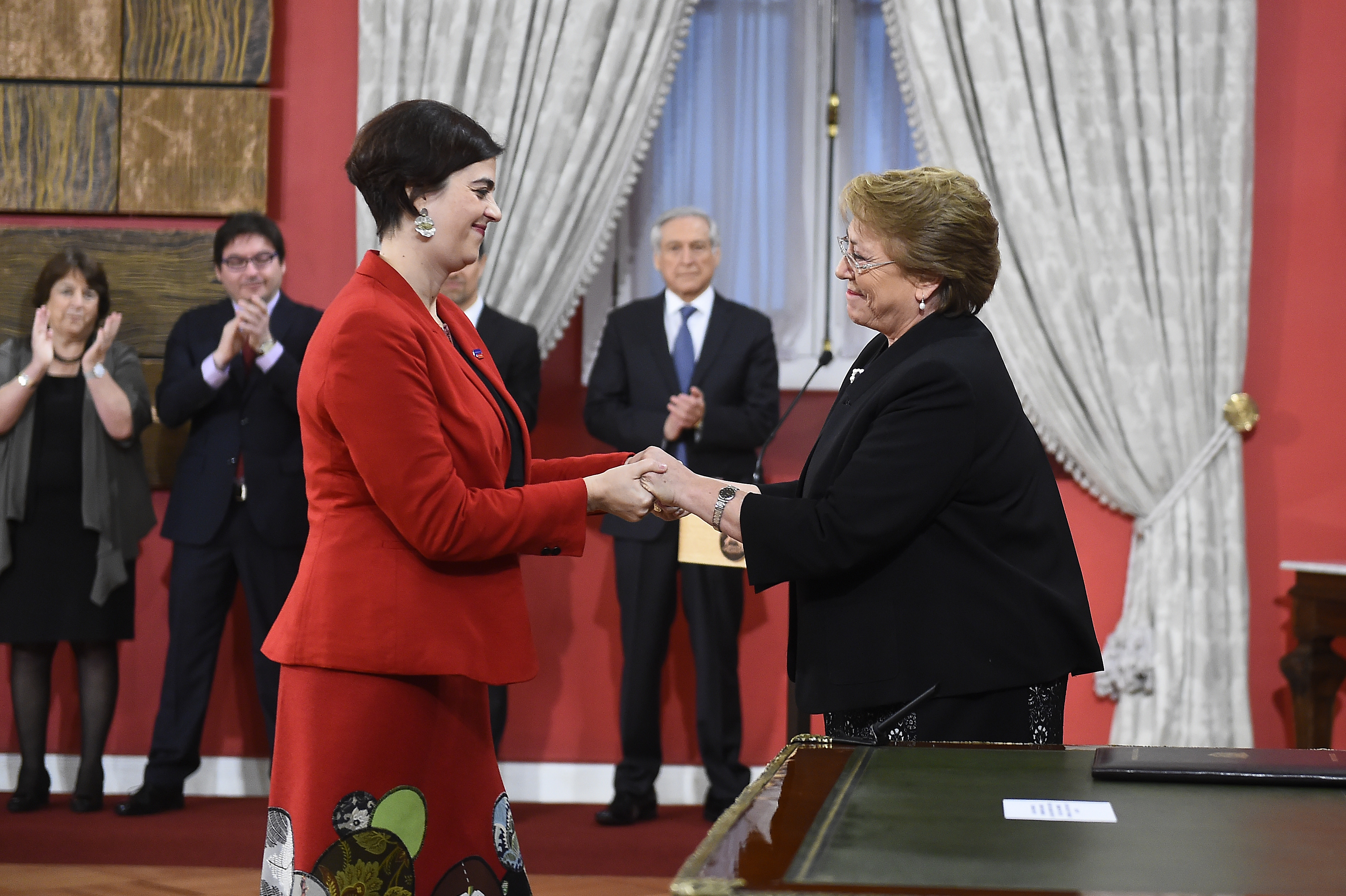
Claudia Pascual being appointed Minister of Women and Gender Equality, by President Bachelet, on 3 June 2016

A new Ministry for Women and Gender Inequality was formed, replacing the National Women's Service in June 2016 which aimed to formulate policies against abuse of women and gender inequality. Claudia Pascual was appointed as the first ever Minister for Women and Gender Inequality.

The Chilean Congress approved Bachelet's abortion legalization bill in some circumstances in July 2017, but was subjected to challenge in the Constitutional Court. Later, Chile's total abortion ban implemented under the Pinochet regime in 1989 was lifted in August 2017 after the Constitutional Court voted 6–4 to allow the procedure under some circumstances: in cases of pregnancy as a result of rape (up to 12 weeks), if the fetus endangers the mother's life, or if the fetus is not viable. Prior to this, Chile was one of only four nations in the Americas that had a total ban on abortions, the others being El Salvador, Nicaragua and the Dominican Republic. The bill was formally promulgated by Bachelet in September 2017.

==== Constitutional and political reform ====
The Chilean Congress passed Bachelet's proposed abolishment of the binomial voting system introduced by the Augusto Pinochet regime and restoring proportional representation for election to both chambers of the Chilean Congress and requirements that 40% of candidates nominated are female in January 2015. The new system took effect from the 2017 elections, increasing the members of the Chamber of Deputies from 120 to 155 seats and the Senate from 38 seats to 43 seats in 2017 and 50 seats in 2021. As a result, the 2017 election saw the end of the dominance of Bachelet's Nueva Mayoría and conservative coalitions and increased number of new political parties represented in Congress.

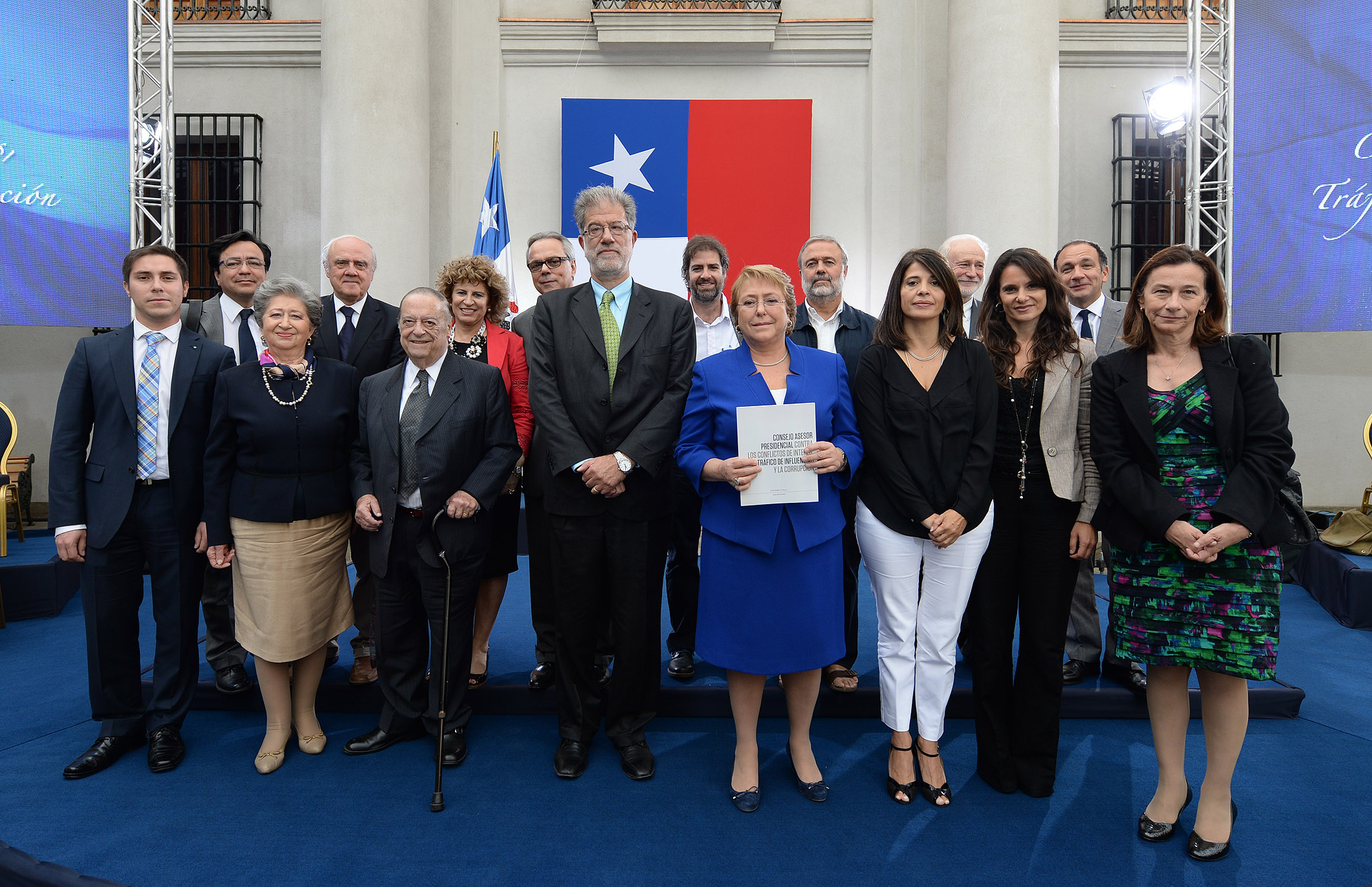
President Bachelet with the Engel Commission, 23 February 2015

Following revelations that President Bachelet's son and daughter in-law were caught in an influence-peddling scandal, she appointed a Presidential Advisory Council on Conflicts of Interest, Influence Peddling, and Corruption (known as the Engel Commission) headed by economist Eduardo Engel. Subsequently, reforms recommended by the commission were implemented which included: ability to remove politicians from office if found guilty for transparency and election spending limits violations, with disqualification for two subsequent elections; and constitutional autonomy to Chile's electoral service (SERVEL), giving it complete independence from the government to more effectively oversee electoral processes and the functioning of politics in general.

In 2016, overseas voting rights for Chilean women and men living outside the country were introduced, allowing Chilean citizens who live abroad to exercise a right to vote beginning from the 2017 elections.

Bachelet had also announced in April 2015 that a constituent process would begin that September to draft and approve a new Constitution of Chile to replace the 1980 Constitution. Five days before leaving office, Bachelet announced in a televised national address that she would present a new constitutional bill to Congress the following day. The proposal followed a series of low-turnout constitutional town halls ("cabildos") held between 23 April and 6 August 2016, not all of whose recommendations were reflected in the final text she submitted; the initiative was not taken up by her successor, Sebastián Piñera, and ultimately did not advance.

==== Immigration ====
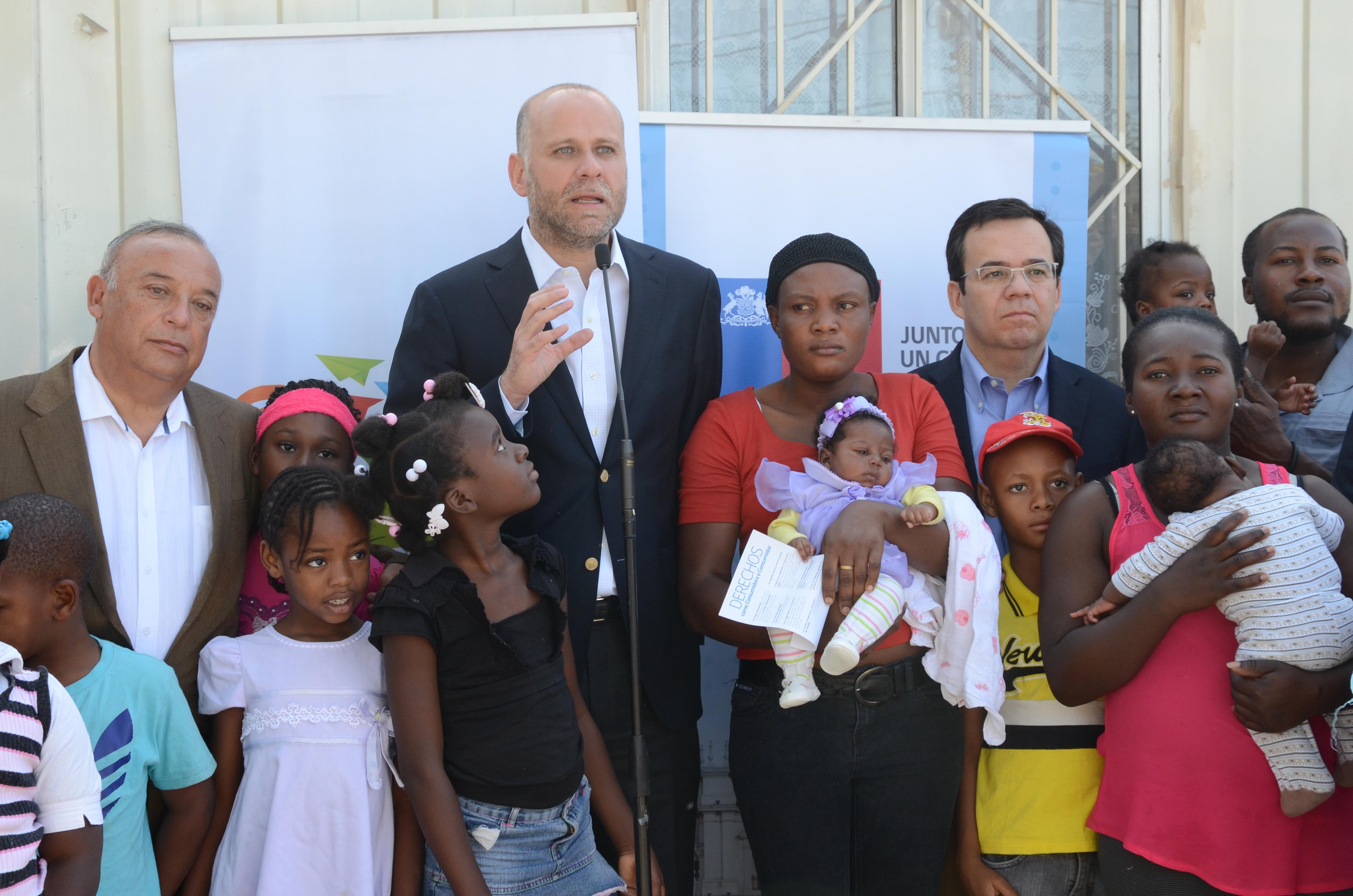
Government officials with Haitian immigrants in 2015

During Bachelet's second term, the number of foreign residents living in Chile rose from 410,988 in 2014 to 1,119,267 in 2017, an increase of about 232%, raising the foreign-born share of the population to 6.1%. Unlike the historically dominant immigrant groups of Peruvians, Bolivians and Argentines, newer communities from Venezuela, Haiti, and Colombia grew especially fast: visas issued to Venezuelans rose from 8,381 in 2015 to 22,921 in 2016 and 73,386 in 2017, while Haitian entry visas rose from 8,888 in 2015 to 23,750 in 2016 and 46,239 in 2017.

During this period, Haitian migrants were also targeted by trafficking schemes involving fraudulent job offers, some of which were carried through Chile via the now-defunct low-cost carrier Latin American Wings (LAW), which operated between 2015 and 2018. The airline itself filed a complaint against travel agencies in 2018 for migrant trafficking. Foreign Minister Heraldo Muñoz later said the government had known that agencies in Port-au-Prince were persuading Haitians to sell their homes and possessions in exchange for the promise of a Chilean work contract that never materialized, and that Chile had repeatedly raised the issue with the Haitian government without success.

In 2017 alone, some 100,000 Haitians arrived in Chile, double the figure of the previous year. Many arrived carrying yellow envelopes containing personal documents, a hotel reservation, and cash meant to "prove" sufficient means for their stay, supplied by travel agencies focused not on tourism but on facilitating emigration. Migrants later reported that, in exchange, their families in Port-au-Prince were left under threat until remittances and loans used to pay for the trip were repaid. In March 2018, days before Bachelet's second term ended, images circulated of an unmarked Boeing 767 carrying Haitian migrants with these yellow envelopes landing in Chile. Migrant trafficking proved to be a lucrative business for the companies involved, and in 2021 prosecutors formally charged five travel-agency executives with facilitating the irregular entry of foreigners under the guise of tourism between October 2017 and 2018, when in fact many intended to settle permanently in the country.

Sources closer to Bachelet said her government approached immigration with a "humanitarian, inclusive and regionally integrative" focus, consistent with her government platform. Among other pro-immigrant measures, Bachelet launched the "Chile Reconoce" program, which guaranteed Chilean nationality to the children of transient foreigners born in the country, with support from NGOs and UNICEF. On 8 September 2017, the government began building trenches at unauthorized border crossings in Colchane to prevent the passage of vehicles, though not pedestrians, outside official checkpoints.

=== Foreign relations ===
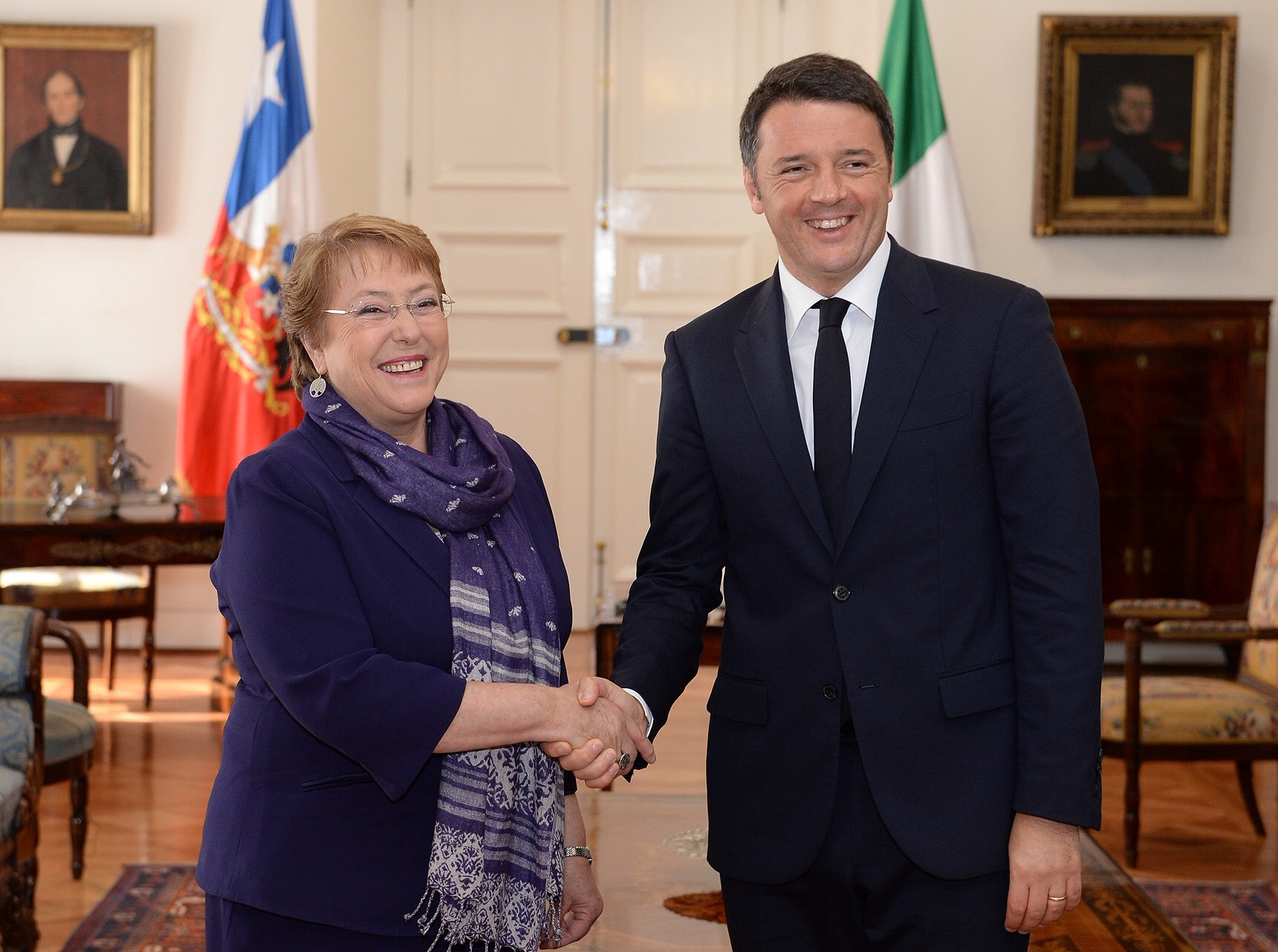
President Bachelet with Italian Prime Minister Matteo Renzi in 2015

==== Trade ====
On 8 March 2018, three days before Bachelet left office, the Comprehensive and Progressive Agreement for Trans-Pacific Partnership (CPTPP) multilateral trade agreement was signed in Santiago with Chile and 10 other signatory countries in the Asia Pacific region, following renegotiation of the original Trans-Pacific Partnership (TPP) which was signed in February 2016. The TPP was renegotiated into the CPTPP following the United States' withdrawal from the original TPP in January 2017.

=== Popularity ===
In September 2015, Bachelet's approval rating was 24%, compared to 72% disapproval. Chileans' support for her dropped sharply after revelations of corruption scandals such as the Caval scandal, which involved her son and daughter-in-law accepting millions of dollars in the form of a loan from vice-chairman of the Banco de Chile Andrónico Luksic Craig. The couple's company (Caval) used the money to purchase land and resell it at a $5 million profit after repaying the loan. Bachelet maintains that she was unaware of her family's actions and found out about the agreement between Luksic and her daughter-in-law through the press. By August 2016, Bachelet's approval rating dropped to 15%, the lowest for any President since the return of free elections in 1990, and in March 2017, Bachelet's approval rating remained low, at about 23%.

Bachelet left office in March 2018 with an approval rating at 39% according to Adimark, in contrast to the 84% rating when she left office in 2010.

== First post-presidency roles (2018) ==
While still serving as president, in January 2018 Bachelet accepted the future presidency of the World Health Organization's Partnership for Maternal, Newborn & Child Health, to take effect once her term ended. She handed over the presidential sash to Sebastián Piñera for a second time on 11 March 2018, and succeeded Graça Machel as head of the alliance on 20 May 2018. In August 2018, Bachelet launched the Fundación Horizonte Ciudadano, described in Chilean media at the time for its youth-oriented branding and use of inclusive language.

== UN High Commissioner for Human Rights (2018–2022) ==
Video during the COVID-19 pandemic

On 8 August 2018, Bachelet was nominated by Secretary-General António Guterres to become United Nations High Commissioner for Human Rights, and her nomination was confirmed unanimously by the General Assembly two days later. On 10 September 2018, Bachelet urged China to allow observers into Xinjiang and expressed concern about the situation there. She said that: "The UN rights group had shown that Uyghurs and other Muslims are being detained in camps across Xinjiang and I expect discussions with Chinese officials to begin soon". China called for Bachelet to respect its sovereignty. She took formal office on 5 September, succeeding Zeid Raad Al Hussein and becoming the seventh person to hold the four-year post.

On 3 September 2018, in her first act as High Commissioner, Bachelet demanded the immediate release of two Reuters journalists sentenced to seven years in prison in Myanmar for investigating a massacre of the Rohingya Muslim minority carried out by the Burmese army in 2017. On 7 September, she welcomed the Indian Supreme Court's decision to decriminalize homosexuality, saying "It's a fantastic day for India and for all those who believe in the universality of human rights." Two days later, she condemned death sentences handed down by an Egyptian court against dissidents over violent incidents connected with the 2013 dismantling of protest camps in Cairo following the ouster of former president Mohamed Morsi. On 10 September, after opening a session of the UN Human Rights Council in Geneva, she criticized Italy for blocking NGO rescue ships carrying migrants from entering its ports.

In September 2018, Bachelet criticized the Saudi Arabian-led intervention in Yemen. She has called on Saudi Arabia to hold accountable those responsible for airstrikes on civilians in Yemen.

On 5 October 2019, Bachelet said she was "troubled by the high levels of violence associated with some demonstrations" during the 2019–20 Hong Kong protests, and stressed that any measures to quell the unrest must be grounded in law. She also stated that "Freedom of peaceful assembly … should be enjoyed without restriction to the greatest extent possible. But on the other hand, we cannot accept people who use masks to provoke violence."

Regarding the November 2019 Iranian protests, Nasrin Sotoudeh, a jailed Iranian lawyer, asked Bachelet to administrate an independent investigation into the alleged atrocities committed by the Iranian security forces in the uprising.

Bachelet's office produced a series of reports on the human rights situation in Venezuela — known collectively as the Bachelet Reports — which contributed to the establishment of a UN human rights mission in the country and were endorsed by the UN Human Rights Council. On 2 July 2021, under a mandate from the UN Human Rights Council running from 2019 to 30 April 2021, her office published a 21-page report addressing violations of the right to life, torture and ill-treatment, detention conditions, sexual violence, failures of access to justice and reparations, and violations of freedom of association, opinion, and expression in Venezuela; it noted continuing reports of torture and cruel, inhuman and degrading treatment of political and common-law detainees, forced disappearances, prolonged incommunicado detention, delayed and partial trials, and the closure of five radio stations and television channels. The report specifically highlighted the disappearances of military officer Antonio Sequea Torres, Lieutenant Colonel Juan Antonio Hurtado Campos (missing since September 2018), and Hugo Enrique Marino Salas (missing since April 2019).

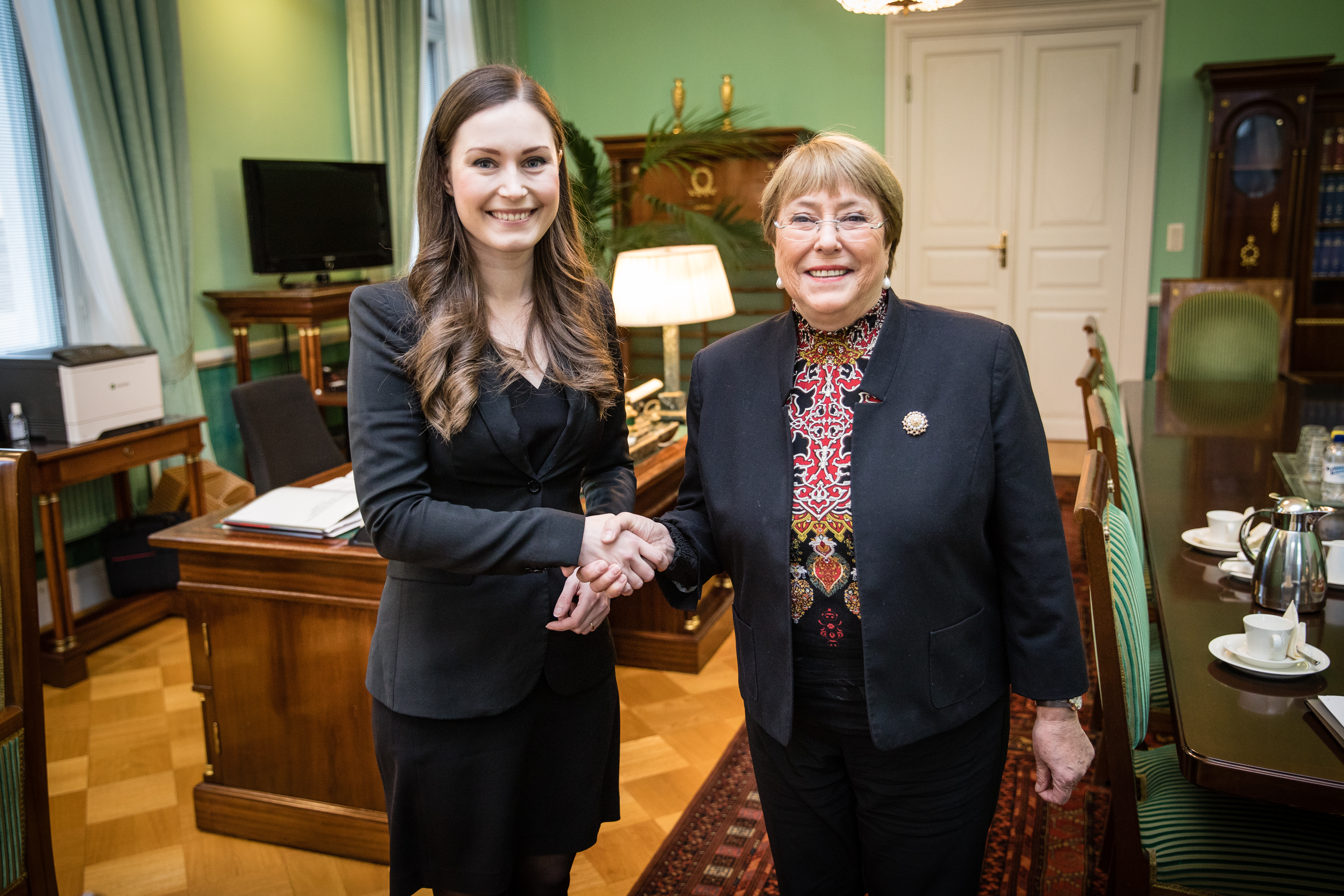
Bachelet with Finnish Prime Minister Sanna Marin in Helsinki, 5 February 2020

In January 2020, Bachelet issued a report on Israeli settlements in the Occupied Palestinian Territory and in the occupied Syrian Golan. This report said:

the establishment and expansion of settlements in the Occupied Palestinian Territory amounts to the transfer by Israel of its population into the Occupied Palestinian Territory, which is prohibited under international humanitarian law. The transfer of an occupying Power's population to a territory it occupies amounts to a war crime that may engage the individual criminal responsibility of those involved. A number of international bodies have confirmed the illegality of Israeli settlements in the Occupied Palestinian Territory and the occupied Syrian Golan, including the International Court of Justice, the Security Council, the General Assembly and the Human Rights Council.

During the COVID-19 pandemic, Bachelet asked the United States to suspend its sanctions regimes as way to help alleviate the pandemic's impact on the people of sanctioned countries.

On 9 October 2020, Bachelet expressed concern about the suffering of civilians during the Nagorno-Karabakh conflict between Armenia and Azerbaijan.

In January 2021, in preparation for the 2021 spring session of the UN Human Rights Council, Bachelet issued a report on Sri Lanka. The report criticized the failure of the current Sri Lankan government to address documented accusations of grave and numerous human rights crimes perpetrated during and after the civil war in Sri Lanka, even though the war had ended in 2009.

In February 2022, Bachelet's report on the human rights situation in the Occupied Palestinian Territory said that "there are serious concerns that steps taken thus far by Israel and the Palestinian authorities to investigate alleged violations of international humanitarian law during the escalation of hostilities in May 2021 have not been sufficient" and that

there was an almost total failure to ensure accountability for numerous allegations of the excessive use of force by Israeli forces in the context of law enforcement operations in the Occupied Palestinian Territory, resulting in the killing and injury of Palestinians. With regard to the Palestinian authorities, few steps were documented in the investigation and prosecution of members of Palestinian security forces or of the security forces in Gaza responsible for the alleged excessive use of force and other human rights violations committed against Palestinians.

Bachelet visited Xinjiang in May 2022, which marked the first time in 17 years that a UN high commissioner for human rights had travelled to China. Bachelet's statement following the visit praised China's "[p]overty alleviation and the eradication of extreme poverty, 10 years ahead of its target date" as "tremendous achievements", noting also that China's "introduction of universal health care and almost universal unemployment insurance scheme go a long way in ensuring protection of the right to health and broader social and economic rights". Bachelet stated that in Xinjiang she had "raised questions and concerns about the application of counter-terrorism and de-radicalisation measures and their broad application – particularly their impact on the rights of Uyghurs and other predominantly Muslim minorities" and that "the Government assured me that the [Vocational and Educational Training Center] system has been dismantled". She also "encouraged the Government to undertake a review of all counter terrorism and deradicalization policies to ensure they fully comply with international human rights standards, and in particular that they are not applied in an arbitrary and discriminatory way".

Bachelet's visit was criticized by organizations such as Amnesty International and Human Rights Watch. The New York Times described Bachelet's comments regarding Xinjiang as "couched in the language of the Chinese government" and the editorial boards of The Guardian and The Washington Post criticized the visit. The World Uyghur Congress as well as the U.S.-based Campaign for Uyghurs organization both called for her to resign.

On 13 June 2022, Bachelet announced that she would not seek a second term as UN High Commissioner on Human Rights following the expiration of her term on 31 August 2022. She said the decision was motivated by her desire to spend more time with her family in Chile and was unrelated to her recent trip to Xinjiang. Western human rights advocates welcomed her move nonetheless, with WUC President Dolkun Isa contending that the "mounting criticism of her inability to condemn the human rights atrocities" in China must have been a factor in her decision. In her final brief at the UN's summer session, Bachelet said her office was going to provide an updated assessment on the human rights situation in Xinjiang. In the brief, she also brought up the killing of journalist Shireen Abu Akleh, urging Israel to open a criminal investigation and adding that the "now chronically high levels of killings and injuries of Palestinians, including children by Israeli forces in the occupied Palestinian territory, have continued in the first six months of 2022". Bachelet's report on Xinjiang was published on her final day in the role of high commissioner, but unusually she did not sign off on the report with her signature. As she departed the UN post, Bachelet urged renewed efforts to "avoid a great global fracture".

== Second post-presidency (2022–present) ==
Following her departure from the United Nations, Bachelet remained one of Chile's most highly rated public figures. On 3 April 2024, she was elected unanimously as vice president of the Club de Madrid, representing the Global South and Latin America, succeeding Laura Chinchilla.

=== Nomination for UN Secretary-General ===
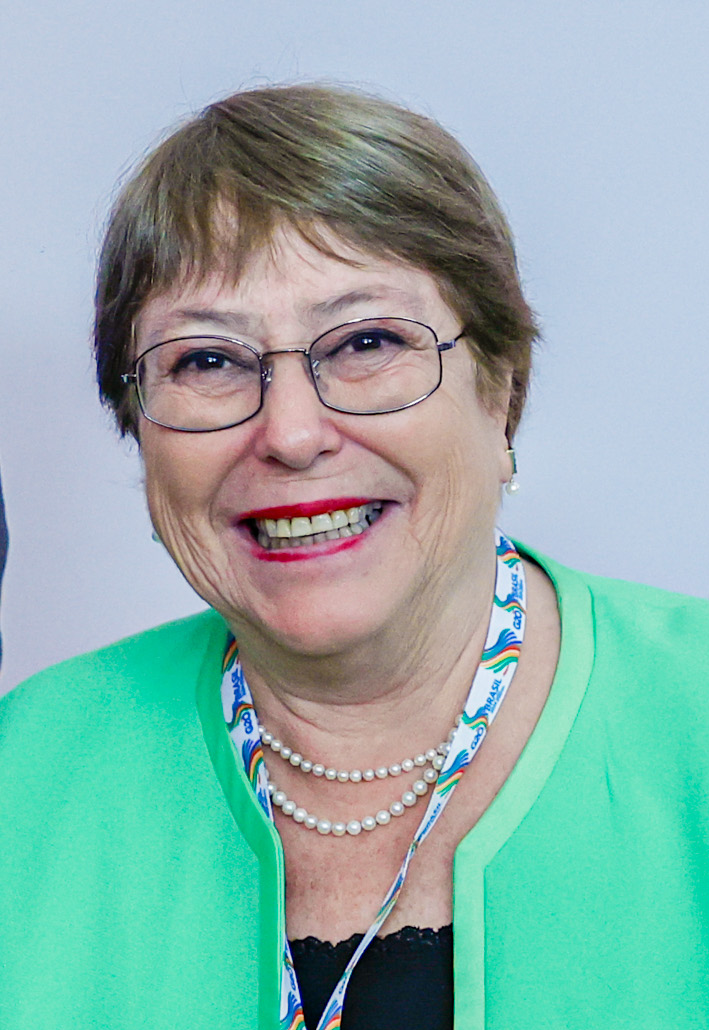
Bachelet in 2024

On 23 September 2025, Bachelet was nominated by Chilean president Gabriel Boric to become the next Secretary-General of the United Nations upon the end of António Guterres' tenure in 2026. On 2 February 2026, President Boric officially registered Bachelet's candidacy, presented jointly with the governments of Mexico and Brazil. On 24 March 2026, the government of President José Antonio Kast, a longstanding critic of multilateral institutions who as a presidential candidate in 2021 had proposed withdrawing Chile from the United Nations Human Rights Council, announced that it had decided to withdraw Chile's support for Bachelet's candidacy. Despite this setback, her candidacy continued to enjoy strong regional support, with the governments of Luiz Inácio Lula da Silva of Brazil and Claudia Sheinbaum of Mexico explicitly reiterating their backing. Bachelet's campaign continued to struggle to gain traction among Security Council members over the following months. In a third informal Security Council straw poll held on 18 September 2026, she received only one "encourage" vote against eleven "discourage" votes and three expressing no opinion, placing her near the bottom of the field of candidates; Costa Rica's Rebeca Grynspan led the poll with nine "encourage" votes, followed by Guyana's Carolyn Rodrigues-Birkett with eight.

On 19 September 2026, Bachelet announced in a video posted to social media that she had decided not to continue her candidacy for Secretary-General. She said she did not regret taking on the challenge and that her candidacy had helped advance discussion of the prospect of a woman from Latin America leading the organization, stating that no woman had led the UN in its roughly 80-year history and that only one Latin American, Javier Pérez de Cuéllar of Peru, had previously held the post. She added that she would continue her work at the international level. Her withdrawal left seven candidates in the race to succeed Guterres, whose second term was set to conclude on 31 December 2026.

== Awards and media recognition ==
- Ranked 17th most powerful women in the world by Forbes magazine in 2006 (she was No. 22 in 2009, No. 25 in 2008, and No. 27 in 2007). As of 2014, she was ranked 25th.
- Defense of Freedom and Democracy Award by Ramón Rubial Foundation (January 2007).
- Ranked world's 15th most influential person by Time magazine in 2008.
- Shalom Award by the World Jewish Congress (June 2008).
- Maximum Leadership Award (Argentina, October 2008).
- Global Trailblazer Award by Vital Voices (October 2008).
- South American Football Honorary Order of Merit in the Extraordinary Great Collar degree by CONMEBOL in July 2009. She is the first woman to receive such recognition.
- Keys to the City of Lisbon (December 2009).
- Woman of the Bicentenary at the 2010 Energy of Woman Awards by Chilectra (April 2010).
- Federation of Progressive Women's International Prize (Spain, November 2010).
- Keys to the City of Miami (November 2010).
- The Association of Bi-National Chambers of Commerce in Florida's 2010 Award for Leadership in Global Trade (November 2010).
- Member, Inter-American Dialogue (since 2010).
- Washington Office on Latin America's Human Rights Award (November 2010).
- Women's eNews' Newsmaker of the Decade Award (May 2011).
- Ministry of Defense of Argentina's first Generala Juana Azurduy Award (April 2012).
- Eisenhower Fellowships's Eisenhower Medal for Leadership and Service (May 2012).
- 2012 – "10 Most Influential Ibero American Intellectuals" of the year – Foreign Policy magazine.
- She was recognized as one of the BBC's 100 Women of 2017.
- United Nations Environment Programme Champions of the Earth award, becoming the first South American president to receive it (2017).
- Progressive Alliance Award (2018).
- National Geographic Planetary Leadership Award (2018).
- Hillary Rodham Clinton Award, presented by the Georgetown Institute for Women, Peace and Security (2019).
- Indira Gandhi Prize for Peace, Disarmament and Development for 2024

=== Honorary degrees ===
- University of Brasília (April 2006).
- University of Siena (November 2007).
- Universidad de San Carlos de Guatemala (May 2007).
- Federico Santa María Technical University (March 2007).
- University of Essex (April 2008).
- Moscow State Institute of International Relations (April 2009).
- Ewha Womans University (November 2009).
- Pompeu Fabra University (May 2010).
- National University of Córdoba (June 2010).
- Catholic University of Córdoba (June 2010).
- Universidad Internacional Menéndez Pelayo (September 2010).
- Universidad Autónoma de Santo Domingo (November 2010).
- University of Paris III: Sorbonne Nouvelle (November 2010).
- Columbia University (May 2012).
- Université de Montréal (June 2012).
- Universidad Peruana Cayetano Heredia (October 2012).
- Freiberg University of Mining and Technology (October 2014).
- University of Paris VIII (2014).
- University of El Salvador (2015).
- Katholieke Universiteit Leuven (June 2015).
- Inter-American Defense College (2016).
- University of Buenos Aires (April 2017).
- University of Évora (March 2017).
- Metropolitan Technological University, Chile (March 2018).
- University of Guadalajara (2023).
- University of Santiago, Chile (2024).
- National Autonomous University of Mexico (November 2025).

== Styles, honours and arms ==
Presidential styles of Michelle Bachelet Jeria
- Reference style: Her Excellency
- Spoken style: Your Excellency
- Alternative style: Madam President

Michelle Bachelet
- Shield: A heraldic interpretation of the Chilean flag.
- Motto: Incluir para crecer (Include For Growing)
- Order(s): Order of the Seraphim; Order of Charles III; Order of Merit
- Used since Bachelet's induction in the Order of the Seraphim.

=== National honours ===
- Grand Master (2006–2010 and 2014–2018) and Collar of the Order of Merit
- Grand Master (2006–2010 and 2014–2018) and Collar of the Order of Bernardo O'Higgins

=== Foreign honours ===
- Australia: Honorary Companion of the Order of Australia (5 October 2012)
- Ecuador: Grand Collar of the National Order of San Lorenzo (2010)
- Finland: Grand Cross with Collar of the Order of the White Rose of Finland (2007)
- Hungary: Grand Cross with Chain of the Order of Merit of the Republic of Hungary (2008)
- Italy: Knight Grand Cross with Collar of the Order of Merit of the Italian Republic (9 October 2007)
- Lithuania: Grand Cross with Golden Chain of the Order of Vytautas the Great (23 July 2008)
- Malaysia: Honorary Recipient of the Order of the Crown of the Realm (2009)
- Mexico: Collar of the Order of the Aztec Eagle (2007)
- Netherlands: Dame Grand Cross of the Order of the Netherlands Lion, The Netherlands (25 May 2009)
- Portugal:
  - Grand Collar of the Order of Liberty (30 March 2017)
  - Grand Collar of the Order of Prince Henry (7 November 2007)
  - Grand Cross of the Order of Christ (1 December 2009)
- Spain:
  - Collar of the Order of Charles III, Spain (30 October 2014)
  - Collar of the Order of Isabella the Catholic (26 February 2010)
- Sweden: Member of Royal Order of the Seraphim (10 May 2016). Received on her state visit to Sweden.
- Uruguay: Recipient of the Medal of the Oriental Republic of Uruguay (2006)
- Venezuela: Collar of the Order of the Liberator (28 October 2009)

=== Arms ===
As Dame of the Seraphim
(Sweden)

As Grand Master of the Chilean Order of Merit
(Chile)

As Dame of the Order of Charles III
(Spain)

== Documentaries ==
- Michelle Bachelet – Symbol des neuen Chile (Ebbo Demant/SWR, 2004)
- La hija del General ["The General's Daughter"] (María Elena Wood/2006)

== Publications ==
- Bachelet, Michelle (2002). "Los estudios comparados y la relación civil-militar. Reflexiones tras una década de consolidación democrática en Chile". Revista Fuerzas Armadas y Sociedad. 17 (4): 29–35.

Political offices
Preceded by Alex Figueroa	Minister of Health; 2000–2002	Succeeded by Osvaldo Artaza
Preceded by Mario Fernández	Minister of National Defense; 2002–2004	Succeeded by Jaime Ravinet
Preceded by Ricardo Lagos	President of Chile; 2006–2010	Succeeded by Sebastián Piñera
Preceded by Sebastián Piñera	President of Chile; 2014–2018	Succeeded by Sebastián Piñera
Party political offices
Preceded by Ricardo Lagos	Socialist Party nominee for President of Chile; 2005–06	Succeeded by Eduardo Frei Ruiz-Tagle
Preceded by Ricardo Lagos	Concertación nominee for President of Chile; 2005–06	Succeeded by Eduardo Frei Ruiz-Tagle
Preceded by Eduardo Frei Ruiz-Tagle	Socialist Party nominee for President of Chile; 2013	Succeeded by Alejandro Guillier
New alliance	Nueva Mayoría nominee for President of Chile; 2013	Succeeded by Alejandro Guillier
Diplomatic posts
New office	President pro tempore of the Union of South American Nations; 2008–2009	Succeeded by Rafael Correa
New office	Executive Director of UN Women; 2010–2013	Succeeded by Lakshmi Puri; Acting
Preceded by Zeid Raad Al Hussein	United Nations High Commissioner for Human Rights; 2018–2022	Succeeded by Volker Türk
Preceded by Laura Chinchilla	Vice President of the Club de Madrid for the Global South and Latin America; 2024–present	Incumbent
