= Alejandro Ferreiro Yazigi =

Chilean politician

Alejandro Ferreiro
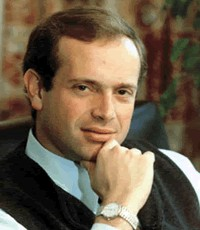

Minister of Economy
- In office 14 July 2006 – 3 January 2008
- President: Michelle Bachelet
- Preceded by: Ingrid Antonijevic
- Succeeded by: Hugo Lavados

Superintendent of Securities and Insurance of Chile
- In office 2 May 2003 – 11 March 2006
- Preceded by: Álvaro Clarke de la Cerda
- Succeeded by: Alberto Etchegaray de la Cerda

Superintendent of Pensions system of Chile
- In office 1 April 2000 – 30 April 2003
- Preceded by: Julio Bustamante Jeraldo
- Succeeded by: Guillermo Larraín Ríos

Superintendent of Electricity and Fuel of Chile
- In office 11 March 2000 – 25 March 2000
- Preceded by: Juan Pablo Lorenzini
- Succeeded by: Verónica Baraona

Superintendent of Isapres of Chile
- In office 11 June 1996 – 11 March 2000
- Preceded by: María Elena Etcheverry
- Succeeded by: José Pablo Gómez

Personal details
- Born: 18 March 1966 (age 60) Santiago, Chile
- Party: Christian Democratic (1985−present)
- Spouse: Claudia Bobadilla (1992−2002)
- Children: José Antonio Ferreiro; Juan José Ferreiro
- Parent(s): José Antonio Ferreiro; María Edith Yazigi
- Education: University of Chile (B.Sc); University of Notre Dame (M.Sc)
- Occupation: Researcher, Scholar and Politician
- Profession: Economist

Alejandro Ferreiro Yazigi (born 18 March 1966) is a Chilean politician and lawyer who served as minister during the first government of Michelle Bachelet (2006–2010).

He has worked as a consultant on issues such as health insurance regulation and pension systems for various international organizations and countries, including the World Bank, the Inter-American Development Bank (IDB), the Pan American Health Organization, India, Egypt, Paraguay, the Dominican Republic, Argentina, Peru, and Bolivia.

Ferreiro served as a member of the Executive Committee of the International Association of Insurance Supervisors (2004–2005), and as president of the International Organisation of Pension Supervisors (2002–2003).

== Family and education ==
He is the eldest child and only son of José Antonio Ferreiro Serrano, a descendant of Galician immigrants and a mid-sized businessman from the commune of Vitacura, and María Edith Yazigi Melej.

He was educated at the prestigious Saint George's College, Santiago, from which he graduated as the top student of his class (Best Georgian). There, he was a classmate of filmmaker Andrés Wood and politicians Claudio Orrego and Arturo Barrios, among other prominent figures in Chilean public life.

In 1992, he married Claudia Andrea Bobadilla Ferrer. The couple had one son, José Antonio, and divorced in 2002.

He studied at the Faculty of Law of the University of Chile, where he was also the top student of his class and received the Premio Montenegro. He later moved to the United States, where he earned a Master of Arts degree from the University of Notre Dame (1989–1990).

== Public career ==
In 1985, he joined the Christian Democratic Party of Chile. At the age of 24, he entered the administration of President Patricio Aylwin as an adviser in the Division of Political and Institutional Relations of the Ministry General Secretariat of the Presidency, then headed by fellow Christian Democrat Edgardo Boeninger.

After a period at the Tiempo 2000 Corporation, he became Executive Secretary of the National Commission on Public Ethics, an entity created during the administration of Eduardo Frei Ruiz-Tagle, when political scientist Genaro Arriagada served as Minister Secretary-General of the Presidency.

In 1996, he was appointed Superintendent of Isapres, a position he held until the end of the administration.

When Ricardo Lagos assumed the presidency, Ferreiro was briefly appointed Superintendent of Electricity and Fuels. He subsequently became Superintendent of Pension Fund Administrators. In that role, he implemented Chile's multifund pension system and dealt with the Inverlink scandal, particularly regarding the group's AFP subsidiary, Magister. In May 2003, he was appointed Superintendent of Securities and Insurance, serving until March 2006.

On 14 July 2006, he returned to government service as Minister of Economy, Development and Reconstruction under President Michelle Bachelet. He was replaced by Hugo Lavados in January 2008.

In academia, he was a professor of economic law at the Faculty of Law of the Andrés Bello National University from 2000 to 2004. Since 2006, he has taught at the School of Government and Business of the Adolfo Ibáñez University, offering courses on anti-corruption public policies, economic regulation, and corporate governance.

In 2008, he was appointed a councillor of the Council for Transparency by the president and unanimously confirmed by the Senate of Chile, assuming office for a six-year term.

In October 2011, he was unanimously elected president of the body, succeeding Raúl Urrutia. He was succeeded in mid-2013 by Jorge Jaraquemada.

On 25 May 2016, he joined the Board of Directors of Everis as an Independent Director.
