= Chinese people in Chile =

Chinese people in Chile Chinos en Chile
智利华人

Total population
- 13,528—17,021 by census 2017; 20,000 with descendants

Regions with significant populations
- Northern Chile, Santiago

Languages
- Chilean Spanish, Chinese

Related ethnic groups
- Overseas Chinese

It is estimated that there are over 20,000 Chinese people in Chile. Chinese immigrants come from both China and Taiwan.

== Reasons for immigration ==
A high demand for manpower in the Southern South American region was present around the 1950s–1960s because of capitalism in the region. This demand for manpower also drew in a huge number of Chinese people coming to South America for work, which explains the huge increase of Chinese people 1950s–1960s. This immigration was also present in the War of the Pacific with Chinese immigrating to both Peru and Chile to enlist into the war effort. After the war came to a close with a Chilean victor, people from Peru also settled in Chile. This was supportive due to the damages of the war done and they could work for construction of the infrastructure or just working inside factories.

== Migration history ==
Between 1,200 and 1,500 Chinese workers in Peru offered support to the Chilean side in the War of the Pacific (1879–1883) and thus went to Chile at the war's end.

Today the Chinese people living in Chile work primarily in trade and restaurant jobs. Although in Santiago one can find many local Chinese businesses, including importers, supermarkets, mini markets, malls (shopping centers such as Santiago Centro and Estación Central), Chinatowns are not concentrated in one place, except in the neighborhood of Patronato, where most of the Asian (i.e. mostly Chinese, Korean and Taiwanese) immigrants, niche businesses and supermarkets in Santiago are located.

== Notable people ==
- Jaime Carreño Lee Chong, footballer
- Rung Fang Cheng, dancer and participant Rojo
- Chinoy, singer songwriter, visual artist
- Jorge Chiong, works director of the commune of Lampa
- Ximena Chong, prosecutor
- Guillermo Chong, geologist
- Óscar Lee Chong, former footballer
- Diego Lin Chou, writer
- Luis Cruz-Villalobos, poet, psychologist
- Quintín Quintana, coolie leader and personality of the War of the Pacific
- Viviana Shieh, singer
- Yuc Ramón Kong, medical field

== See also ==
- Chile–China relations
- Chinatowns in Latin America - about the Chinese community of Santiago

== Sources ==
- Chou, Diego Lin (2004), Chile y China: inmigración y relaciones bilaterales (1845-1970) (in Spanish), Santiago de Chile: Instituto de Historia/Centro de Investigaciones Diego Barros Arana, ISBN 956-244-165-2
