= Hugo Lavados =

Chilean politician

Minister of Economy, Development and Tourism
- In office 8 January 2008 – 11 March 2010
- President: Michelle Bachelet
- Preceded by: Alejandro Ferreiro Yazigi
- Succeeded by: Juan Andrés Fontaine

Superintendent of Securities and Insurance of Chile
- In office 11 March 1990 – 11 March 1994
- President: Patricio Aylwin
- Preceded by: Fernando Alvarado
- Succeeded by: Daniel Yarur

Personal details
- Born: 16 August 1949 (age 77) Talca, Chile
- Party: Christian Democratic
- Spouse: Mary Rose Mackenzie
- Children: Two
- Parent(s): Manuel Lavados; Luisa Montes
- Education: University of Chile (B.Sc); University of Boston (M.Sc)
- Occupation: Researcher, Scholar and Politician
- Profession: Economist

Hugo Sebastián Lavados Montes (born 4 February 1950) is a Chilean economist who served as minister during the first government of Michelle Bachelet (2006–2010).

He has served as rector of the San Sebastián University (USS), a position he assumed for a second time on 1 June 2023. He was also a minister of state, serving as Minister of Economy during Michelle Bachelet's first government.

== Biography ==
The son of Manuel Lavados, a small industrial entrepreneur who operated an iron foundry on the same property as his home, and Luisa Montes, a primary-school teacher who taught at School No. 6 in Talca, he studied—like his older brothers Jaime ―who later served as head of the University of Chile― and Iván (who directed the Inter-University Development Center for more than thirty years)—at the boys' high school in that city and later at the José Victorino Lastarria High School in Santiago.

He is an economist from the University of Chile and holds a master's degree from Boston University.

He served as Superintendent of Securities and Insurance from 1990 to 1994, and concurrently as a member of the Antitrust Resolution Commission. He later became general manager of Banco BHIF (1994–1998) and executive vice president of Habitacoop, a position he assumed in December 1998 while the cooperative was facing significant difficulties.

Lavados subsequently served as director of the state export-promotion agency ProChile until march 2006, when Ricardo Lagos' government ended

He was appointed Minister of Economy, Development and Reconstruction, at 2008 during M. Bachelet first government (Lavados is a member of the Christian Democratic Party of Chile, which at the time formed part of the governing coalition).

He left the ministry at the end of the administration in March 2010, shortly after the legal reform that created a dedicated institutional framework for the tourism sector.

At the beginning of 2013, he became chairman of the board of AFP Cuprum following its acquisition by Principal Financial Group. The following year, he was appointed rector of the San Sebastián University, a position he held until March 2018, when he was succeeded by Carlos Williamson.

As rector, he faced criticism over his connections with the governing coalition, which critics argued enabled him to act as a lobbyist in securing state funding.

Among his academic activities, he has served as a research professor in the Department of Economics at the University of Chile and has taught macroeconomics, microeconomics, economic development, and project evaluation in the university's economics program.

He was recognized as the outstanding academic of the Faculty of Administration and Economics at the University of Santiago, Chile in 1983.

He has also worked as a consultant for the World Bank and the Inter-American Development Bank in Peru, Uruguay, Costa Rica, Ecuador, and Paraguay on securities-market reform and modernization.

On 25 May 2016, he joined the Board of Directors of Everis as an Independent Director.
