= Ingrid Antonijevic =

Chilean Minister of Economy, Development and Reconstruction
- In office March 11, 2006 – July 14, 2006
- President: Michelle Bachelet
- Preceded by: Jorge Rodríguez Grossi
- Succeeded by: Alejandro Ferreiro Yazigi

Personal details
- Born: 22 July 1952 (age 74) Iquique, Chile
- Party: MAPU (1969–1973); Party for Democracy
- Spouse: Separated
- Children: Two
- Education: University of Chile
- Occupation: Entrepreneur
- Profession: Economist
- Website: www.ppd.cl

Ingrid Antonijevic Hahn (born 22 July 1952) is a Chilean economist, entrepreneur, academic and former Minister of Economy, Development and Reconstruction (2006) for only two months, in the first cabinet of socialist president Michelle Bachelet. In her youth, she was a militant in the MAPU organisation, and after the end of the Pinochet regime she was one of the founders of the Party for Democracy (Partido Por la Democracia a.k.a. PPD) that has led the transition towards democracy in Chile. She is a progressive entrepreneur who promotes corporate social responsibility and the involvement of the private sector in projects initiated by the government that aim to benefit the whole country. She has acquired notoriety in her country for holding positions in organisations that have traditionally been held by men.

== Biography ==
Antonijevic was born in the northern Chilean port city of Iquique in the Tarapacá Region to a politically right-wing upper middle class family. She is the youngest daughter of Croatian immigrant and entrepreneur, Leandro Antonijevic Bezmalinović, and Ingeborg Hahn Von Neumann from Germany.

At the age of 7 her family transferred to Santiago, Chile where she continued her education and excelled academically, graduating in economics from the University of Chile. As a young student radical she became a militant in the MAPU organisation that formed part of the Popular Unity coalition headed by Salvador Allende that was overthrown in a military coup on September 11, 1973.

In 2006 she was awarded the Circle of Honour by the University of Chile in recognition of her services to the public sector and for being among the most prominent graduates of this university.

Antonijevic was interested in meditation for many years before she became a devotee of zen meditation after a holiday in Japan, where she became a student of zen Buddhist priest Gudo Wafu Nishijima. She lives and works in Santiago, Chile and promotes zen meditation among her employees in the workplace. She has two elder sisters, Nadja and Ilona, two children, Felipe and Carolina Saint Jean, and two grandchildren.

== Positions held ==
- Professor of the Faculty of Industrial Engineering (University of Chile)
- Executive of Republic National Bank of New York (1982–1984)
- Board of Directors of the Chilean State Bank
- President of Sal Lobos
- Minister of Economy, Development and Reconstruction
- Government Appointed Nuclear Energy Commission
- President of ADIN & Blue Company
