= Raúl Urrutia =

Chilean politician

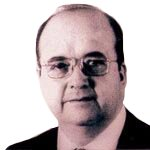

Head of the Universidad del Mar
- In office 10 April 2012 – 30 May 2012
- Preceded by: Héctor Zúñiga
- Succeeded by: Patricio Galleguillos

Member of the Chamber of Deputies
- In office 11 March 1990 – 11 March 1998
- Preceded by: District created
- Succeeded by: Gonzalo Ibáñez
- Constituency: 14th District

Personal details
- Born: 1 May 1950 (age 76) Vina del Mar, Chile
- Party: Renovación Nacional
- Education: Pontifical Catholic University of Valparaíso (LL.B)
- Profession: Lawyer

Raúl Urrutia Ávila (born 1 May 1950) is a Chilean lawyer and politician who served as deputy.

After the profit and corruption scandal of the Universidad del Mar, he resigned to his position as head of that university.

== Biography ==
He was born in Viña del Mar on 1 May 1950, the son of Emma Ávila Andía and Ramón Urrutia Henríquez.

He married Mónica Schiappacasse Soffia and they have four children.

=== Education and professional career ===
He completed his secondary education at the Liceo Eduardo de la Barra in Valparaíso. After finishing school, he entered the Pontifical Catholic University of Valparaíso, where he studied Classical Philology, but withdrew the following year. That same year, he enrolled in History at the University of Chile, Valparaíso campus, studying until 1975, when he left the program to enter the Faculty of Law of the Pontifical Catholic University of Valparaíso. He was admitted as a lawyer before the Supreme Court of Chile on 19 December 1983.

He has practiced law independently in the areas of Commercial and Corporate Law, Foreign Investment, Intellectual Property and Trademarks, Negotiation and Mediation. He was partner at the law firm Oelckerse, Urrutia y Cía. and served as arbitrator at the Arbitration and Mediation Center of the Regional Chamber of Commerce of Valparaíso. In 2006, he became Director of Schwager Energy S.A.

In academia, he has served as professor of Constitutional Law and Political Theory at various universities.

== Political career ==
He began his political activities upon joining the National Youth (JN), serving as provincial president between 1970 and 1973. He later joined National Renewal.

Between 1973 and 1980, he worked as official at the Ministry General Secretariat of Government, and later as lawyer in the Legal Department of the Municipality of Viña del Mar between 1986 and 1989.

In December 1989, he was elected Deputy representing National Renewal for District No. 14, Viña del Mar, Valparaíso Region, for the 1990–1994 term. In 1993, he was re-elected for the 1994–1998 term.

In September 2008, he was appointed by President Michelle Bachelet and with agreement of the Senate of Chile, as member of the Board of the [Council for Transparency (CPLT) until 2011, serving as its chairman between 2010 and 2011.

In 2012, he served as Rector of the University of the Sea, where he had also been a professor.
