= Ximena Chong =

Chilean lawyer and prosecutor (1971-)

- Born: Ximena Loreta Chong Campusano; 1971 (age 54–55); Santiago, Chile
- Occupations: Lawyer and prosecutor

Ximena Loreto Chong Campusano (born 1971) is a Chilean lawyer and prosecutor of mixed Chinese origin. She specializes in tax, money laundering and corruption offenses, and has been involved in investigations regarding political bribes from the Corpesca fishing company, corruption in the National Forest Corporation, prosecution in the murder of Narumi Kurosaki, and involvement of Chilean businessmen in Operation Car Wash.

== Biography ==
Ximena Chong Campusano is the daughter of an accountant and a housewife. Her paternal grandfather, Arturo Chong Yueng, was a butcher who arrived in Chile from China in 1935. Ximena Chong said that her father grew up in a traditional Chinese family and her mother in a traditional Chilean family.

She studied law and after graduating as a lawyer she completed a magister in public law at the University of Chile.

After working for the Chilean tax authorities, in particular as head of the legal department, she joined the Public Ministry in 2003 at the age of 33. She first worked there as head prosecutor of the Valdivia regional office, before being transferred a year later to the North Centre office in Santiago. There, she was head of the economic crimes office until its dissolution in 2011. She then worked for five years as head of the Santiago Centre regional office, before being appointed head of the high-complexity crime unit in the Centre Nord office.

She is described by those who worked with her as a "good student", a "feminist" and a "hard worker".

== Main investigations ==
From 2015, she was involved in the Corpesca corruption investigation, in which she accused Senator Jaime Orpis of receiving funds from Corpesca.

In February 2017, National Prosecutor Jorge Abbott entrusted her with the investigation of the "fire cartel", which also involved corruption in the hiring of three Spanish companies to deal with fires in the south-central part of the country.

In 2017, she joined the second part of the Chilean investigation regarding the murder of Narumi Kurosaki, in which the main suspect is a Chilean citizen.

She is also investigating the OAS company in Chile as part of Operation Lava Jato, for tax fraud, campaign finance fraud and violation of the law on donations, in which presidential candidate Marco Enríquez Ominami is allegedly involved.

From 2020 onwards, she was involved in a number of investigations relating to the 2019-2021 demonstrations in Chile, such as the case of Gustavo Gatica, who lost his sight during a demonstration, and the case of a young minor who was pushed off the Pío Nono bridge into the Mapocho River by a carabinier. In this context, she was the target of death threats.
