= Latin American Wings =

Chilean charter airline

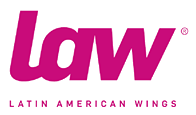
IATA	ICAO	Call sign
LW	JMR	LAWI
- Founded: 2015
- Commenced operations: 27 January 2016
- Ceased operations: 10 March 2018
- Operating bases: Arturo Merino Benítez International Airport
- Fleet size: 5
- Destinations: 8
- Key people: Andrés Dulcinelli, general manager
- Website: www.vuelalaw.com

Latin American Wings (LAW) was a short-lived scheduled charter airline based at Arturo Merino Benítez International Airport in Santiago, Chile. At the time that operations were suspended, LAW flew to six destinations using Boeing 737-300 aircraft.

== History ==
LAW was founded by a group of lawyers; executives in the insurance company and construction industries; and pilots for Middle Eastern airlines. It was led by Andrés Dulcinelli. The consortium had invested US$3 million in the airline, which might increase to $5 million. LAW would focus on operating flights to underserved markets.

LAW operated its first flight on 27 January 2016, from Santiago to Punta Cana. Flights made a technical stop in Lima. LAW used a Boeing 737-300 aircraft belonged to fellow start-up Chilejet. The airline had planned to receive two Boeing 767-300 operated by Air New Zealand and two Boeing 757-200 operated by Icelandair. In August 2017, the CEO of the LAW had stated a plan to add up to 14 Boeing 737-300 in the next two years.

In February 2017, the Chilean government filed a complaint against LAW for possible implications related to Haitian immigrants smuggling, using the route between Santiago and Port-au-Prince to smuggle an estimate of 14,000 people.

After only 2 years, unable to gain any significant market share against Sky Airline and the nascent JetSmart, LAW abandoned all domestic operations on January 9, 2018. Two months later, on March 10, facing the inability to use Jorge Chávez International Airport as a technical stop effective March 15, LAW announced that it was suspending operations.

== Destinations ==
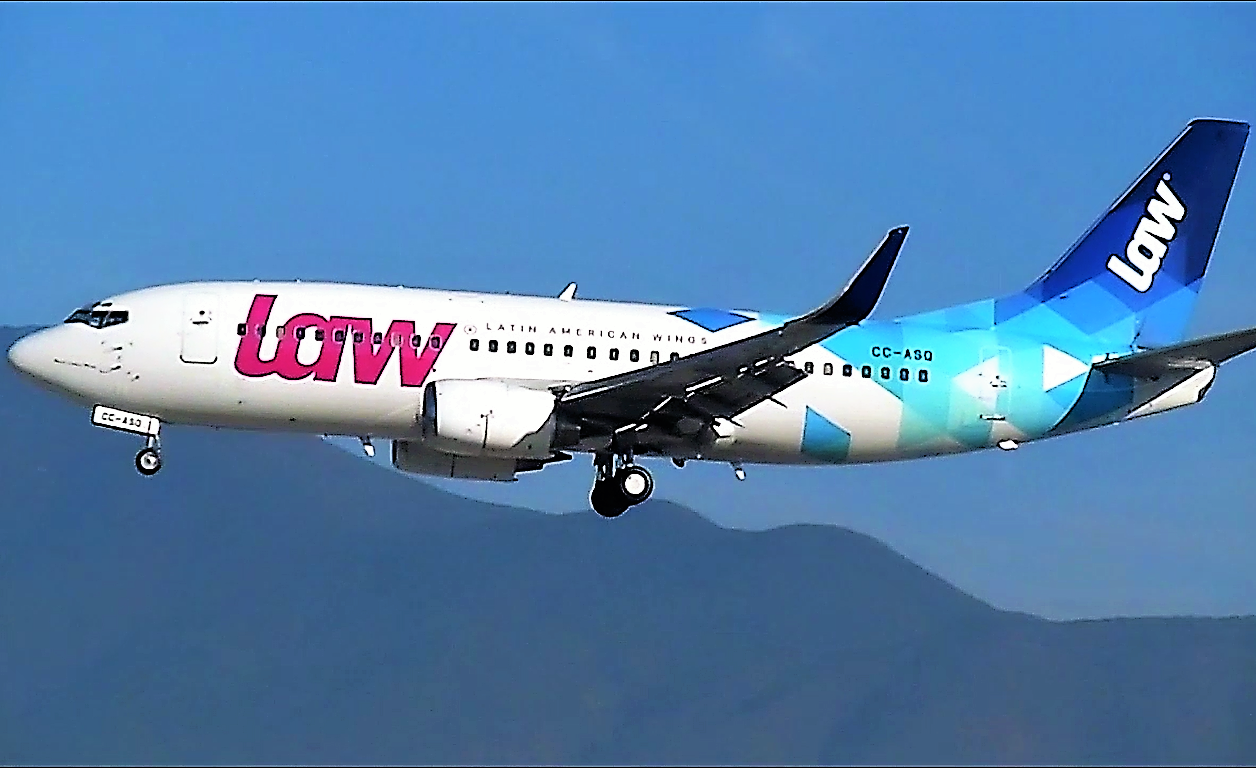
Latin American Wings Boeing 737-300 landing in Santiago Airport.

At the time that operations were suspended, LAW flew to the following destinations:

Country	City	Airport	Notes
Argentina	Mendoza	Governor Francisco Gabrielli International Airport	—
Chile	Santiago	Arturo Merino Benítez International Airport	Base
Dominican Republic	Punta Cana	Punta Cana International Airport	—
Haiti	Port-au-Prince	Toussaint Louverture International Airport	—
Peru	Lima	Jorge Chávez International Airport	—
United States	Miami	Miami International Airport	—
Venezuela	Caracas	Simon Bolivar International Airport (Venezuela)	—

== Fleet ==
When operations were suspended, the Latin American Wings consisted of the following aircraft:

Latin American Wings fleet
Aircraft	In service	Orders	Passengers	Notes
Boeing 737-300	5	—		
Total	5	—		
