= Aníbal Palma =

Chilean politician (1935–2023)

Ambassador of Chile to Costa Rica
- In office 1995–1997
- President: Eduardo Frei Ruíz-Tagle
- Preceded by: Edmundo Vargas
- Succeeded by: José Maluenda

Minister of Housing and Urbanism
- In office 9 August 1973 – 28 August 1973
- President: Salvador Allende
- Preceded by: Luis Matte Valdés
- Succeeded by: Pedro Felipe Ramírez

Minister General Secretariat of Government
- In office 27 March 1973 – 9 August 1973
- President: Salvador Allende
- Preceded by: Hernán del Canto
- Succeeded by: Fernando Flores

Minister of Education
- In office 17 June 1972 – 2 November 1972
- President: Salvador Allende
- Preceded by: Alejandro Ríos Valdivia
- Succeeded by: Jorge Tapia Valdés

Undersecretary of Foreign Affairs
- In office 3 November 1970 – 17 July 1972
- President: Salvador Allende
- Preceded by: Patricio Silva Echenique
- Succeeded by: Luis Orlandini Moya

Personal details
- Born: 31 October 1935 Santiago, Chile
- Died: 16 February 2023 (aged 87) Santiago, Chile
- Party: Radical (1952−1990); PRSD (1987−1989); Socialist (from 1990)
- Education: University of Chile (LL.B)
- Occupation: Diplomat; politician; lawyer

Aníbal Francisco Palma Fourcade (31 October 1935 – 16 February 2023) was a Chilean politician who served as minister and ambassador.
