= Partido Republicano =

Partido Republicano may refer to:

- Portuguese Republican Party
- Republican Party (Bolivia)
- Republican Party (Chile, 1982)
- Republican Party (Chile, 2019)
- Republican Party (Panama)
- Republican Party (Puerto Rico)
- Republican Party (United States)

"Republicano" may also refer to the Republican faction in the Spanish Civil War.
