= Carlos Figueroa Serrano =

Chilean politician (born 1930)

Carlos Figueroa
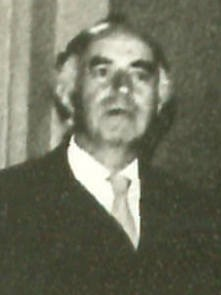

Minister of the Interior
- In office 20 September 1994 – 1 August 1998
- President: Eduardo Frei Ruíz-Tagle
- Preceded by: Germán Correa
- Succeeded by: Raúl Troncoso

Minister of Foreign Affairs
- In office 11 March 1994 – 20 September 1994
- President: Eduardo Frei Ruíz-Tagle
- Preceded by: Enrique Silva Cimma
- Succeeded by: José Miguel Insulza

Ambassador of Chile to Argentina
- In office 26 April 1990 – 17 May 1993
- President: Patricio Aylwin
- Preceded by: Sergio Gaete
- Succeeded by: Edmundo Vargas

Minister Economy, Development and Tourism
- In office 5 September 1969 – 3 November 1970
- President: Eduardo Frei Montalva
- Preceded by: Enrique Krauss
- Succeeded by: Pedro Vuskovic

Undersecretary of Agriculture
- In office 1967–1968
- President: Eduardo Frei Montalva
- Preceded by: Daniel Barría
- Succeeded by: Felipe Amunátegui

Personal details
- Born: 28 November 1930 (age 95) Angol, Chile
- Party: Christian Democratic Party
- Children: Seven
- Parent(s): Carlos Figueroa Unzuela; Isabel Serrano
- Education: University of Chile (LL.B)
- Occupation: Politician
- Profession: Lawyer

Carlos Figueroa Serrano (born 28 November 1930) is a Chilean politician and lawyer who served as minister during the presidencies of Eduardo Frei Montalva (1964−1970) and Eduardo Frei Ruíz-Tagle. Similarly, he was ambassador of Chile in Argentina.

In 1957, he graduated as a lawyer.

== Early life ==
Figueroa was born to Carlos Figueroa Unzueta and Isabel Serrano Menchaca. He completed his primary and secondary education at the Colegio de los Sagrados Corazones de Santiago. He subsequently studied law at the University of Chile, qualifying as a lawyer in 1957.

Beginning in 1960, he served as a professor of procedural law at the Pontifical Catholic University of Chile. He also served as an abogado integrante (associate justice) of the Santiago Court of Appeals in 1971 and 1972.

He married Sara Guzmán Valdés, with whom he had seven children.

== Political career ==
=== Early political career ===
Figueroa joined the Christian Democratic Party in 1957, the year of its foundation.

During the administration of President Eduardo Frei Montalva, he served as Undersecretary of Agriculture in 1967, during the implementation of the Chilean land reform, and later as Minister of Economy, Development and Reconstruction from 1969 to 1970. During this period he also served as acting minister in the portfolios of Agriculture, Lands and Colonization, and Foreign Affairs.

From 1972 to 1973, he was communications director for Eduardo Frei Montalva's Senate campaign.

=== Concertación ===
In 1988, Figueroa served as executive undersecretary of the No campaign during the 1988 Chilean national plebiscite, which ultimately led to the end of General Augusto Pinochet's rule. He subsequently headed communications and advertising for the presidential campaign of Patricio Aylwin, who served as President of Chile from 1990 to 1994.

Following the inauguration of President Eduardo Frei Ruiz-Tagle in 1994, Figueroa was appointed Minister of Foreign Affairs and shortly thereafter Minister of the Interior.

After leaving office in 1998, citing health reasons, he joined Senator Andrés Zaldívar's presidential campaign, although Zaldívar ultimately did not become his party's presidential nominee.

Figueroa also served as Ambassador of Chile to Argentina, one of Chile's most strategically important diplomatic postings.

He also served as president of the Supreme Tribunal of the Christian Democratic Party.

== Media activities ==
Figueroa was also active in the media sector. He served as president of the Association of Chilean Broadcasters (ARCHI) from 1972 to 1978 and as a member of the board of the International Association of Broadcasting (AIR) from 1973 to 1979.

He also served on the board of the company operating Radio Cooperativa, one of Chile's most influential radio stations.
