= Chile Democrático =

Chile Democrático ("Democratic Chile") was an organization of Chilean exiles around the world, established in Rome in 1973. Chile Democrático was one of two organizations which the Swedish Immigration Department recognized as a national organization of the Chilean community (the other being the Chilean National Union). The Swedish authorities had, however, advocated that the two national organizations merge into one, a suggestion that could not materialize due to political differences between the two bodies. Chile Democrático had branches in around 80 countries, including Australia, France, Mexico and Sweden.

Chile Democrático joined the People's Democratic Movement (MDP), a movement based inside Chile. With the formation of the United Left (IU), the importance of MDP waned and Chile Democrático was dissolved.
