= Liberal Democrat Party of Chile =

Liberal Democrat Party of Chile Partido Liberal Demócrata de Chile
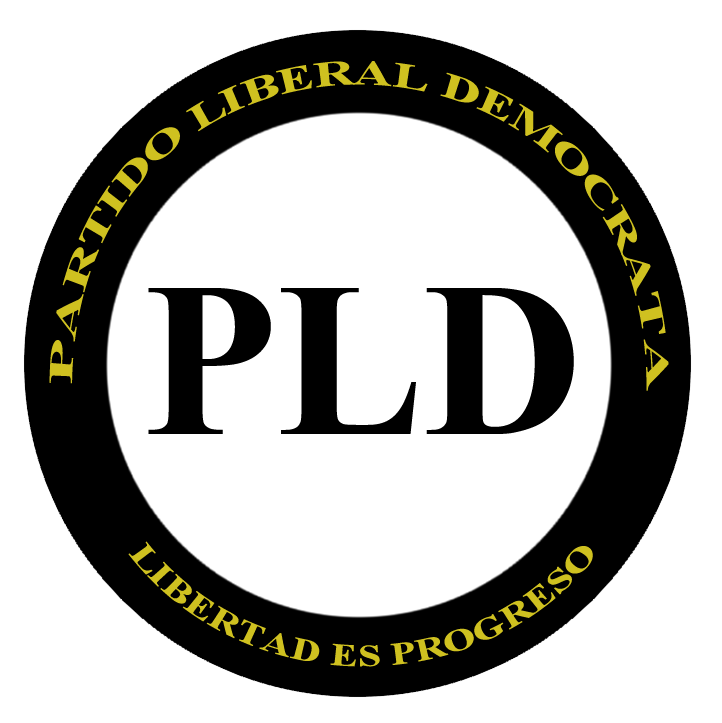
- Founded: 27 July 1988
- Dissolved: 27 February 1989
- Split from: Liberal Party
- Merged into: National Renewal
- Headquarters: Santiago, Chile
- Ideology: Liberalism
- Political position: Center-right

The Liberal Democrat Party of Chile (Spanish: Partido Liberal Demócrata de Chile, PLD) was a Chilean political party that had legal existence from 1988 until 1989 under the state of "in formation".

Its symbol was a circle on top of which had outstanding printed in gold letters "Partido Liberal Demócrata" and at the bottom in letters of the same color and dimensions, "Libertad es progreso" (Freedom is progress). In the center, with a white background, it was the symbol of the party (PLD).

It was born as a faction of the opposition Liberal Party that criticized the attitude of the party itself to the military dictatorship and its merger with fellow dissident Republican Party into the Liberal-Republican Union. Originally adopted the name of Authentic Liberal Party (Partido Liberal Auténtico), soon to be renamed Liberal Party of Chile (Partido Liberal de Chile) and finally changed its name to Liberal Democratic Party. It was officially established on 7 July 1988.

In late 1988 it created the short-lived Democratic Confederation (Confederación Democrática) with the National Party (a faction that supported Pinochet), the Radical Democracy, the Social Democrat Party, the National Advance, the Democratic Party of Chile, the Free Democratic Centre and the Civic Committees. The confederation disappeared in 1989 during negotiations for parliamentary candidates that year.

The party began as a faction of the Liberal Party which (unlike the majority of the Liberal Party) decided to support the option "Yes" vote, which sought the continued rule of Augusto Pinochet in the plebiscite of 5 October 1988. It was dissolved by the Electoral Service of Chile on 14 February 1989, for failing to comply with legal requirements and many of its members joined to National Renewal (RN).
