= Hugo Zepeda =

Hugo Zepeda may refer to:

- Hugo Zepeda Barrios (1907–1998), Chilean politician and lawyer
- Hugo Zepeda Barrelleza (born 1963), Mexican politician, represented the 3rd federal electoral district of Baja California
- Hugo Zepeda Coll (born 1936), Chilean former priest and politician
