= Juan Martínez Sepúlveda =

Chilean politician (1943–2025)

Member of the Chamber of Deputies
- In office 11 March 1990 – 11 March 1994
- Preceded by: District created
- Succeeded by: Alejandro Navarro
- Constituency: 45th District

Personal details
- Born: 25 September 1943 Concepción, Chile
- Died: 9 May 2025 (aged 81)
- Party: PS (1966–1988, 1990–2025); PAIS (1988–1990)
- Spouse: Nilda Pérez
- Children: Three
- Education: University of Concepción; Inacap
- Occupation: Technician

Juan Martínez Sepúlveda (25 September 1943 – 9 May 2025) was a Chilean politician. A member of the Socialist Party and the Broad Party of Socialist Left, he served in the Chamber of Deputies from 1990 to 1994.

Martínez died on 9 May 2025, at the age of 81.

== Biography ==
Martínez was born in Concepción on 25 September 1943. He married Nilda Parra Barrientos and is the father of three children.

He completed his secondary education at the Liceo "Enrique Molina Garmendia" in Concepción. He pursued higher studies at the School of History and Geography of the University of Concepción. He later trained as an Industrial Refrigeration Technician at INACAP.

In the private sector, he worked as an entrepreneur in public transportation.

== Political career ==
He began his political activities in 1966 when he joined the Socialist Party of Chile. During the 1970 presidential campaign of Salvador Allende, he served in the Secretariat of the Mass Front of the Provincial Youth Command. The following year, he became Secretary of Organization of the Regional Committee of Concepción.

After the 1973 coup d’état, he acted as a clandestine regional leader between 1976 and 1987 and served as Regional Secretary of the Socialist Party in Concepción from 1982 to 1993. Following the party’s 24th Congress in 1981, he became a member of its Central Committee.

In Concepción, he held positions as leader of the Movimiento Democrático Popular (MDP) and of the United Left Regional organization. He later served as coordinator of the local Command for the "No" campaign in the 1988 plebiscite and as national and regional leader of the Partido Amplio de Izquierda Socialista (PAIS).

In the December 1989 parliamentary elections, he was elected Deputy for District No. 45 (Tomé, Penco, Florida, Hualqui, Coronel, and Santa Juana), Biobío Region, for the 1990–1994 term. He obtained 24,799 votes (22.99% of the validly cast ballots).
