= Hugo Zepeda Barrios =

Chilean politician

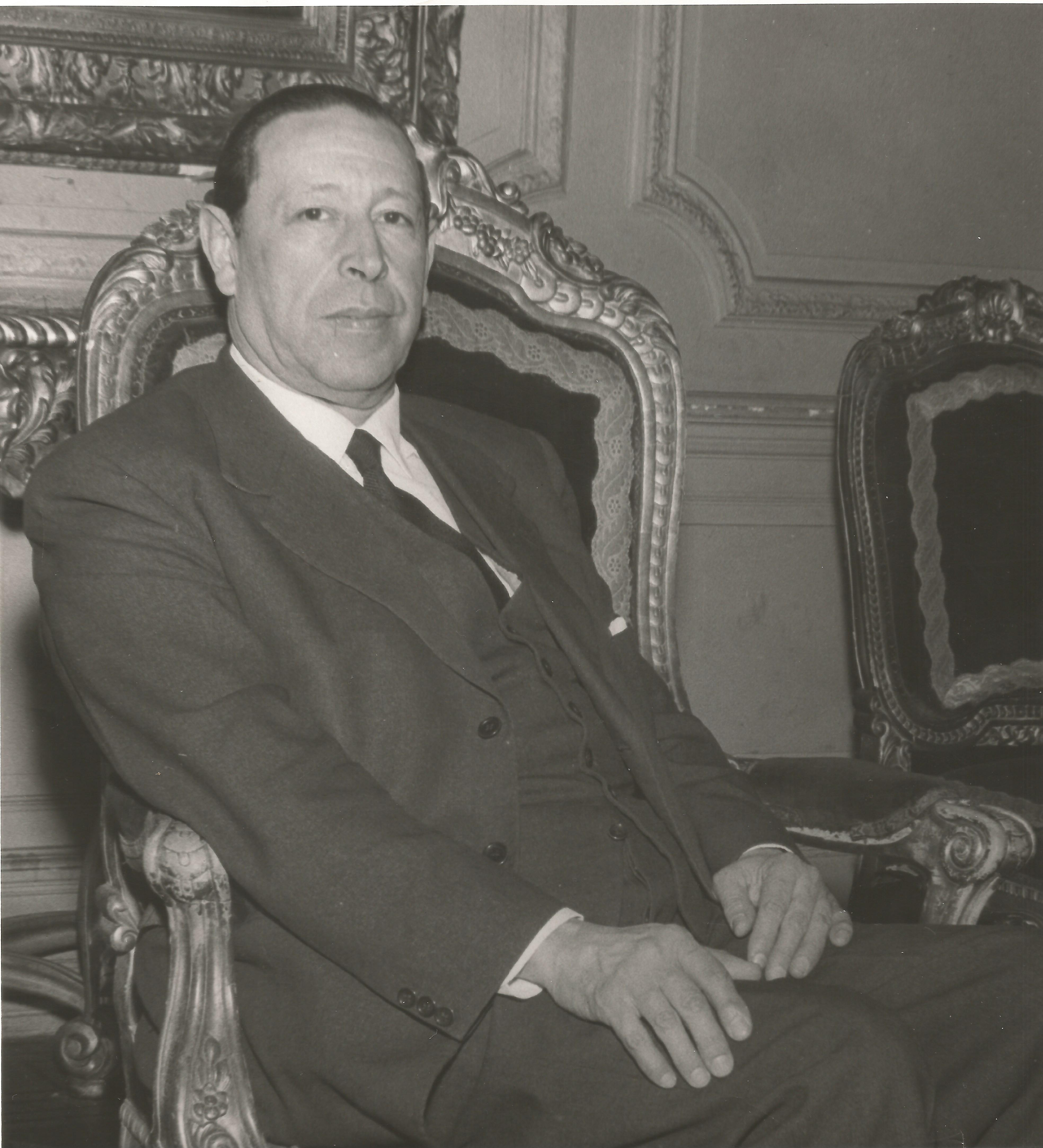

President of the Senate of Chile
- In office 10 May 1962 – 15 May 1965
- Preceded by: Hernán Videla Lira
- Succeeded by: Hermes Ahumada

Member of the Senate of Chile
- In office 3 December 1957 – 15 May 1965
- Preceded by: Raúl Marín Balmaceda
- Constituency: 2nd Provincial Agrupation (Atacama and Coquimbo)

Member of the Chamber of Deputies of Chile
- In office 15 May 1933 – 3 December 1957
- Succeeded by: Julio Mercado Illanes
- Constituency: 23rd Departamental Agrupation (Osorno and Río Negro)

Personal details
- Born: 9 January 1907 Ovalle, Chile
- Died: 9 January 1998 (aged 91) Coquimbo, Chile
- Party: Liberal Party (1938–1966); Republican Party (1982–1988); Liberal-Republican Union (1988–1990); Liberal Party (1988–1990)
- Spouse: Ana Coll Juliá
- Children: Six: Hugo, Patricio, Gonzalo, Rodrigo, María Isabel and Ana María
- Parent(s): Gonzalo Zepeda Perry; Cristina Barrios Flores
- Education: University of Chile (LL.B)
- Occupation: Politician
- Profession: Lawyer

Hugo Alejandro Zepeda Barrios (4 June 1907 – 9 January 1998) was a Chilean politician and lawyer who served as President of the Senate of Chile.
