= Liberal Party (Chile, 1988) =

Liberal Party Partido Liberal
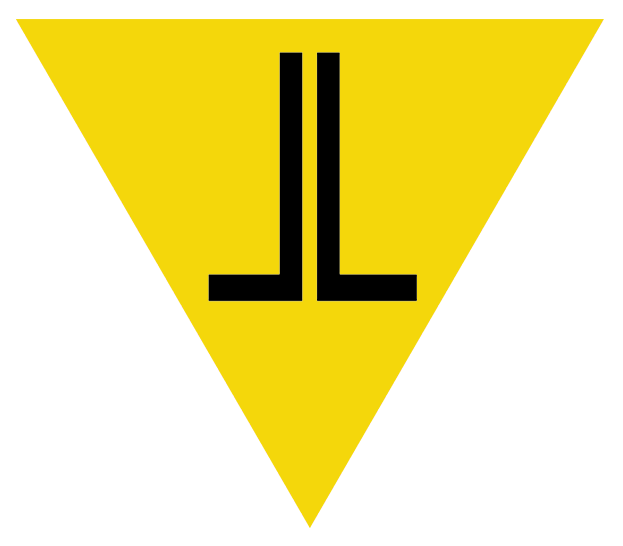
- Founded: 31 May 1988
- Dissolved: 8 June 1994
- Preceded by: Liberal-Republican Union
- Merged into: Party of the South
- Headquarters: Santiago, Chile
- Ideology: Liberalism; Social liberalism
- Political position: Centre

The Liberal Party (Spanish: Partido Liberal, PL) was a Chilean centrist political party existing between 1988 and 1994.

The Liberal Party was founded on May 31, 1988 as a continuation of the Liberal-Republican Union, formed in 1987 following the merger of the Liberal and Republican parties. July 25 was declared as a party "in formation", and registered in the register of political parties on April 21, 1989.

It supported the "No" option in the plebiscite of 1988, and was one of the founders of the Concertación, but the party left soon after to support Francisco Javier Errázuriz Talavera in the presidential election of 1989. The party also was constituting an electoral pact with the Chilean Socialist Party for the parliamentary election of that year.

On July 17, 1990, the Liberal Party (led by Carlos Cerda) merged with the Party of the South, which risked its dissolution by the Electoral Service, adopting the name of the first.

After the municipal elections of 1992, where the party only gained representation in the Araucania Region, the party's general secretary Eduardo Diaz Herrera called for its dissolution as Liberal Party, and found it again as Southern Party, an issue that materialized on March 5, 1993; however, the party was dissolved definitely on June 8, 1994.
