= Democratic Alliance (Chile, 1983) =

Democratic Alliance Alianza Democrática
- Founded: 6 August 1983
- Dissolved: 2 February 1988
- Succeeded by: Concertación
- Headquarters: Santiago, Chile
- Political position: Big tent Factions: Left-wing to centre-right

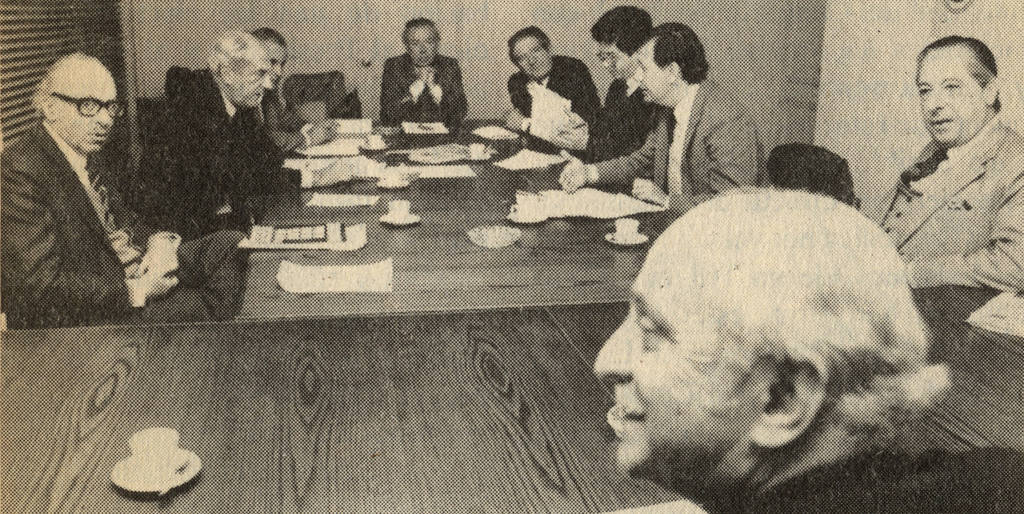
Foundation of the Democratic Alliance, 6 August 1983.

The Democratic Alliance (Spanish: Alianza Democrática, AD) was a Chilean political coalition existing between 1983 and 1988 that was composed of political parties and organisations that opposed the military regime led by Augusto Pinochet.

== History ==
=== Origins and foundation ===
The origins of the Democratic Alliance date back to March 14, 1983, when a "Democratic Manifesto" was signed by Hugo Zepeda Barrios, Julio Subercaseaux (representing liberal and conservative sectors); Luis Bossay, Duberildo Jaque, Enrique Silva Cimma, Luis Fernando Luengo (representing radicals and social democrats); Gabriel Valdés, Patricio Aylwin (representing the Christian Democrats); Ramón Silva Ulloa, and Julio Hernán Vodanovic Stuardo (representing socialist groups).

On August 6, 1983, in a ceremony held in the Círculo Español de Santiago, it announced the creation of the alliance between the Christian Democratic Party, Social Democracy, Radical, Popular Socialist Union and Republican Right (Republican Party since October 1984) plus other groups that did not sign at the time the Democratic Manifesto, such as the "renovated" sector of the Socialist Party of Chile led by Carlos Briones ("PS Núñez" from 1986) on behalf of the Socialist Bloc and the Liberal Party. In 1987 the Republican and Liberal parties merged to form the Liberal-Republican Union. The left-wing parties and groups not represented in the AD, created the People's Democratic Movement (Spanish: Movimiento Democrático Popular, MDP) in September 1983.

On August 22, 1983, the Democratic Alliance was created officially by signing a document called "Bases of the Dialogue for a Grand National Agreement", which contained three basic elements:

- A national agreement to create a constituent assembly and a new constitution.
- Augusto Pinochet's resignation to the Presidency of the Republic.
- The establishment of a provisional government for a brief transition.

=== Political activity ===
It was the first time since the coup of 1973, which was publicly formalized an opposition coalition to the military dictatorship of Pinochet. It held on November 18 in O'Higgins Park the first public event since the coup. A crowd of 500,000 people was estimated.

Taking support in the national protests and in collaboration with the Catholic Church sought a dialogue to end the dictatorship. The Minister of the Interior, Sergio Onofre Jarpa, began a round of talks with the Democratic Alliance and other political groups, however, in a public speech Pinochet evicted and removed his minister from office in November 1984. With this ended any possibility dialog and began a stage of tightening censorship of the press, that had been relaxed in 1983.

In October 1983, the Popular Unitary Action Movement (MAPU) joined the Democratic Alliance, Jorge Molina being its representative in the coalition.

In August 1985, the Democratic Alliance participated with other groups in the signing of the National Agreement, sponsored by the Catholic Church. This document stated commitment to a democratic and peaceful transition to democracy. The government ignored the document and closed any possibility of dialogue that was not to ensure the continuity.

=== Dissolution ===
In 1986, with the removal of PS Núñez (after the Party Congress held on 20 and 21 December of that year) and the Socialist Bloc, the Democratic Alliance entered a phase of low profile because of the inability to fulfill their initial objectives and unwillingness to dialogue Pinochet government. The member parties of the Democratic Alliance and other political groups formed the February 2, 1988 the National Command for the No to direct the voting campaign against the nomination of Pinochet as president for a period of eight years in the 1988 plebiscite. This is why the Democratic Alliance is considered one of the forerunners of the Concertación.
