= Liberal-Republican Union =

Liberal-Republican Union Unión Liberal-Republicana
- Founded: December 1987
- Dissolved: 30 August 1988
- Preceded by: Liberal and Republican parties
- Merged into: Liberal Party
- Headquarters: Santiago, Chile
- Ideology: Liberalism; Social liberalism
- Political position: Centre to centre-right

The Liberal-Republican Union (Spanish: Unión Liberal-Republicana, ULR) was a Chilean right-wing political party founded in December 1987 from the merger of the Liberal and Republican parties. Its president was Hugo Zepeda Barrios and its secretary general was Gabriel Leon Echaíz.

This amalgam was prompted by the lack of significant ideological differences between liberals and Republicans. Still, a conservative Republican sector refused to join the ULR, as some liberals who were critics of the opposition attitude of his party. The latter withdrew from the Liberal Party to create the Liberal Democrat Party.

It was declared a defender of individual freedoms, democracy and human rights declared. In economic matters, he defended the freedom of enterprise and private property, recognition of the social function the same as its fundamental limit.

It was a member of the Democratic Alliance and on 2 February 1988, signed with other 14 parties the call to vote "No" in the plebiscite to be held in October of that year, making it one of the founders of the Coalition of Parties for Democracy.

On 30 August 1988 he changed its name to Liberal Party and initiated proceedings before the Electoral Service to be legally constituted as a political party.
