= National Democracy of Centre =

National Democracy of Centre Democracia Nacional de Centro
- Founded: 7 May 1990
- Dissolved: 3 December 1991
- Merger of: National Advance; Radical Democracy; National Party
- Merged into: Union of the Centrist Center; National Party
- Headquarters: Santiago, Chile
- Ideology: Conservatism; Classical liberalism Nationalism
- Political position: Right-wing

The National Democracy of Centre (Spanish: Democracia Nacional de Centro) was a political party founded on May 7, 1990 in Chile as a result of the merger of the National Advance, Radical Democracy and National parties. It had legal existence as such, recognized by the Electoral Service, until October 8, 1991, when it merged to the Union of the Centrist Center.

== History ==
One consequence of the limited electoral support right out of the conglomeration of Democracy and Progress in elections to the National Congress in 1989, were the poor results of so-called "small" parties that supported the military regime, among them National Advance, Radical Democracy and the National Party. To remedy the declaration of cancellation for not having obtained 3 deputies or at least 5% of the vote, these parties merged.

The merger was carried out by the public deed of May 7, 1990, was published in the Diario Oficial on May 29, 1990, and was officially registered as a political party before the Electoral Service of Chile on June 17, 1990.

He had a brief and inconspicuous life; many militants from the dissolved parties and Radical Democracy and National Advance were migrating to the newly founded party Union of the Centrist Center, and the former National Party members renamed the National Democracy of Centre to National Party, like its predecessor.
