= People's Democratic Movement (Chile) =

Chilean left-wing political party

People's Democratic Movement Movimiento Democrático Popular
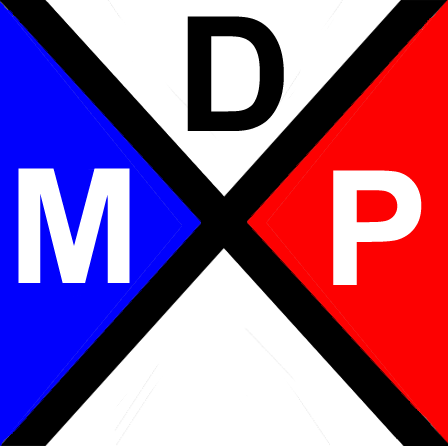
- Founded: September 20, 1983
- Dissolved: June 26, 1987
- Headquarters: Santiago, Chile
- Ideology: Socialism; Communism; Marxism-Leninism; Guevarism; Democratic socialism Anti-fascism
- Political position: Left-wing to Far-left

The People's Democratic Movement (Spanish: Movimiento Democrático Popular, MDP) was a Chilean left-wing political party created on September 20, 1983, and dissolved on June 26, 1987. It was formed by the Communist Party of Chile, PS-Almeyda and the Revolutionary Left Movement (MIR), plus factions of the Christian Left and the Popular Unitary Action Movement (MAPU). Its first president was the socialist Manuel Almeyda.

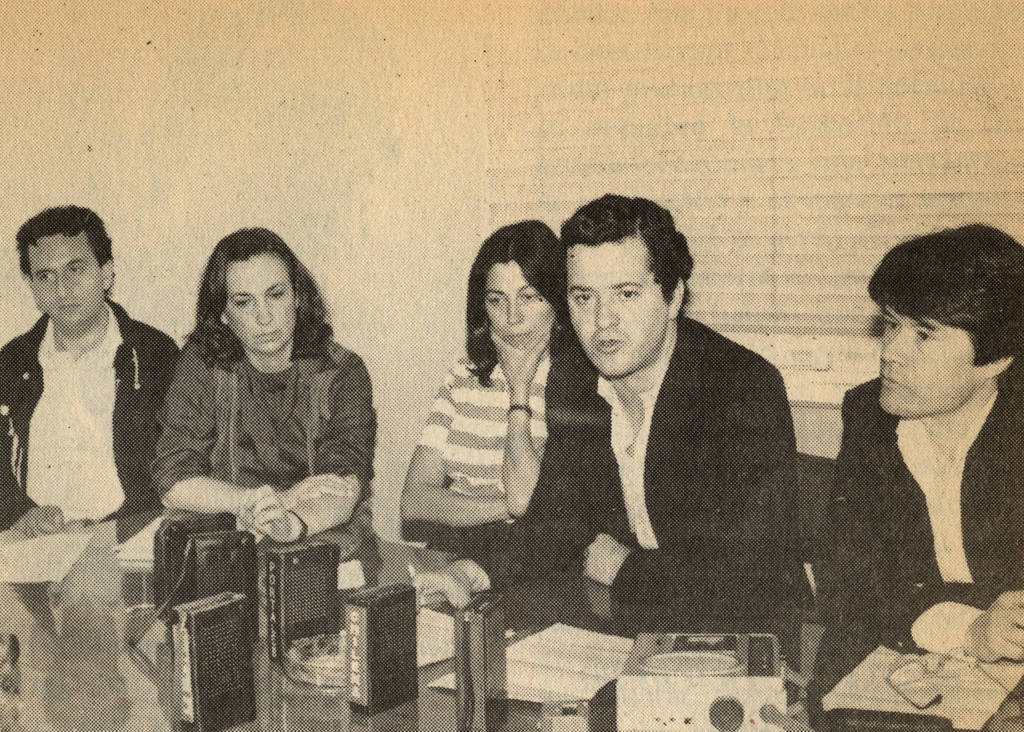
Leaders of the People's Democratic Movement, September 1983

The reason for its creation was to organize the leftist opposition to the military dictatorship. The MDP led the so-called "Jornadas de Protesta Nacional" driven by opposition to the military dictatorship of General Augusto Pinochet, while actively involved in the reconstruction of the social movements of people, students and workers.

The founding of the organization was sparked by the Appeal for Unity and Combat from 1982, signed by Clodomiro Almeyda (Socialist Party), Luis Corvalán (Communist Party), Andrés Pascal (MIR) and Anselmo Sule (a left-leaning radical, who was not authorized by his party). This document stated that the road for ending the military dictatorship was "the struggle of the masses, the unity of the left and a development of the most diverse forms of combat which express the rebellious spirit of the people".

Since its inception, the MDP showed itself to be a staunch opponent of the regime and demanded its immediate end. A general agreement with the Democratic Alliance was made to establish a provisional government without exclusions.

In August 1984, politicians, lawyers, businessmen and civilians who supported the military regime, including Jaime Guzmán and Pablo Longueira, required the Constitutional Court of Chile, which declared the unconstitutionality of this movement. Despite the ruling, the MDP continued subsisting in semi-clandestine.

The MDP self-dissolved in June 1987 to create a new leftist coalition: United Left.

== See also ==
- Revolutionary Left Movement
- Manuel Rodríguez Patriotic Front
- Armed resistance in Chile (1973–90)
