= Liberal Party (Chile, 1983) =

Liberal Party Partido Liberal
- Founded: 1983
- Dissolved: 1987
- Merged into: Liberal-Republican Union
- Headquarters: Santiago, Chile
- Ideology: Liberalism; Classical liberalism
- Political position: Centre to centre-right
- National affiliation: Democratic Alliance

The Liberal Party (Spanish: Partido Liberal, PL) or Liberal Movement (Spanish: Movimiento Liberal, ML) was a Chilean classical liberal political party that existed between 1983 and 1987, with an opposition stance to the military dictatorship led by Augusto Pinochet.

Its origins date back to late 1983, when a group of former members of the old Liberal Party Youth decided to form the Liberal Movement, supporter of individual freedoms and the restoration of democracy by peaceful means. Among its members were Hernán Errazuriz Talavera, who would be ambassador to the United Kingdom during the government of Patricio Aylwin, medical director Arturo Brandt, Gastón Ureta, Gonzalo Gazmuri, Guillermo Toro and Claudio Cerda.

Eventually, it started taking a decidedly oppositional character to Pinochet's regime, which led them to join the Democratic Alliance in October 1984. Subsequently signed the National Agreement and constituted the ephemeral Democratic Federation (Spanish: Federación Democrática) in 1985 with the National Party and the Republican Party. It made its first convention in October 1986.

The alignment of the liberals with the opposition led some critics party members decided to secede from the main Liberal Party. These factions, separated between 1985 and 1987, form the Reformist Liberal Party (Partido Liberal Reformista), the Unionist Liberal Party (Partido Liberal Gremialista) —both subsequently joined the National Party— and the Authentic Liberal Party (Partido Liberal Auténtico), which later evolve into the Liberal Democrat Party of Chile.

In December 1987, the Liberal Party decided to merge with the Republican Party to make way for the Liberal-Republican Union.
