= National Advance =

Defunct political party in Chile

National Advance Avanzada Nacional
- Leader: Pablo Rodríguez Grez
- President: Álvaro Corbalán
- Founded: 11 September 1983
- Dissolved: 17 June 1990
- Preceded by: Fatherland and Liberty
- Merged into: National Democracy of Centre
- Headquarters: Santiago de Chile
- Ideology: Pro–Augusto Pinochet (Note: AN is a pro-Pinochet but not a Pinochetist party; Pinochetists support neoliberalism, but AN does not.); Neo-fascism
- Political position: Far-right

National Advance (Spanish: Avanzada Nacional, AN) was a Chilean far-right political party of nationalist ideology who supported the military regime led by Augusto Pinochet. They had party legal existence between January 1988 and July 1991.

It was founded on 11 September 1983 by former members of Fatherland and Liberty and civilian supporters of the dictatorship. The party constitution was signed on April 15, 1987, the Electoral Service ordered his publication in the official Journal on 29 May 1987. Finally, by resolution O-56 of 29 January 1988, the Electoral Service officially signed up the party.

This party held various positions during the military regime, including more than 70 municipalities. However, the top-level positions were occupied by representatives of the neoliberal right (next to National Renewal and the Independent Democratic Union and close to the economic right of employers), who always tried to displace the nationalist right because it was not in agreement with the neoliberal economic policies of the Chicago Boys (preferably militants in the UDI and RN to a lesser extent). While Pro-Pinochet, they didn't supported the Neoliberal economics of Pinochet's government and with it were against the economical aspect of Pinochetism. In addition, nationalists were considered statist, which clashed sharply with the neoliberals. On the political side there were also a number of differences; even many historians point out that if Pinochet had followed the postulates of the nationalists, they would have had more public support as the AN was representative of the political right and not economic.

In the 1988 plebiscite supported the Yes option. In late 1988 it created the short-lived Democratic Confederation (Confederación Democrática) with the National Party (a faction that supported Pinochet), the Radical Democracy, the Social Democrat Party, the Liberal Democrat Party of Chile, the Democratic Party of Chile, the Free Democratic Centre and the Civic Committees. The confederation disappeared in 1989 during negotiations for parliamentary candidates that year.

In the 1989 elections, the party conducted the electoral pact "Alliance of Centre" with another ruling party, Radical Democracy, in spite of which failed to elect deputies and senators. By the election results the party entered the grounds for cancellation of its legal existence, but this was corrected with the merger with its coalition partners and other smaller parties.

On May 7, 1990, the National Advance merged with the Radical Democracy and the National Party to form the National Democracy of Centre, and the registry of the party was void on June 17 of the same year. National Democracy of Centre was later renamed as National Party (like one of their predecessors) on December 3, 1991.
