= Democratic Socialist Radical Party =

Defunct political party in Chile

Democratic Socialist Radical Party Partido Radical Socialista Democrático
- Founded: 1983 (Radical Party-Luengo); 1987 (Democratic Socialist Radical Party)
- Dissolved: 9 May 1990
- Split from: Radical Party
- Merged into: Radical Party
- Headquarters: Santiago de Chile
- Ideology: Radicalism; Democratic socialism Laïcité
- Political position: Centre-left to left-wing
- National affiliation: United Left (1987-1988); Unity for the Democracy (1989-1990)

The Democratic Socialist Radical Party (Spanish: Partido Radical Socialista Democrático, PRSD) was a political party of Chile that emerged from a leftist faction of the Radical Party led by Luis Fernando Luengo that came into conflict with Enrique Silva Cimma, Raúl Rettig and some radical politicians.

== History ==
The party was founded in 1983 under the name of Radical Party-Luengo (Partido Radical-Luengo) in May 1987 and was renamed Democratic Socialist Radical Party.

Among its leaders and members were Alejandro Ríos Valdivia, Anselmo Sule, Aníbal Palma, Armando Lobos Barrientos, Ana Eugenia Ugalde Arias and the brothers Edgardo Enríquez and Humberto Enríquez Frödden. On 2 July 1989 Hugo Miranda Ramírez was elected party chairman.

It was one of the main parties of the opposition to the military regime of Pinochet and joined the coalitions of United Left and then the Concertación por el No, the party supported the option NO in the plebiscite of 1988 and the following year, in 1989, for the elections supported the candidacy of Patricio Aylwin and joined the Unity for the Democracy pact when it presented two candidates for deputy, where received 0.02% of votes and did not win any seats. The party also presented Aníbal Palma in Tarapacá and Anselmo Sule in the O'Higgins region as candidates for independent senators on the list of the coalition. Sule was elected after doubling with his running mate, the Christian Democrat Nicolás Díaz Sánchez.

The 9 May 1990 was dissolved and its members were finally integrated into the ranks of the Radical Party.
