= 1989 Chilean general election =

- 14 December 1989
- Presidential election
- Turnout: 94.72% (▲11.25pp)
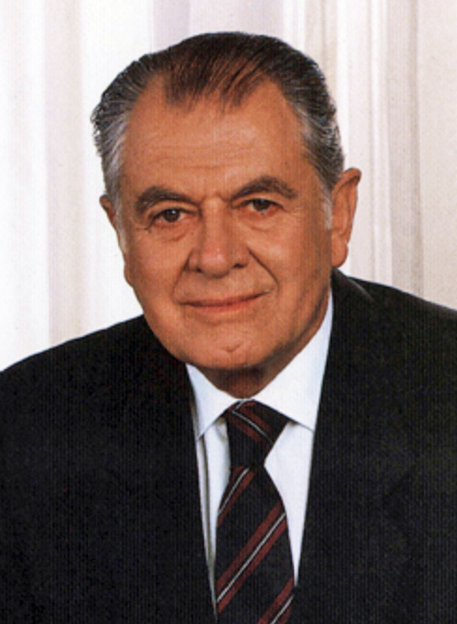

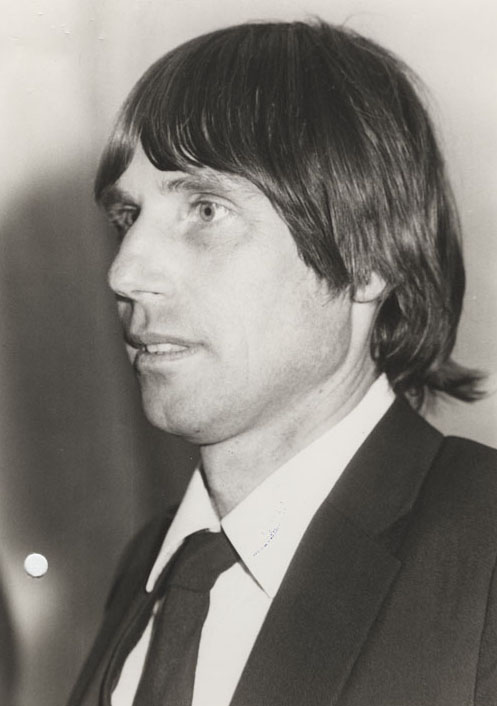

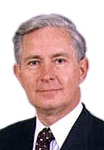
Candidate	Patricio Aylwin	Hernán Büchi	Francisco Javier Errázuriz
Party	PDC	Independent	Independent
Alliance	Concertación	DP	Liberal–Socialist
Popular vote	3,850,571	2,052,116	1,077,172
Percentage	55.17%	29.40%	15.43%
- Results by commune
President before election
Augusto Pinochet
Independent
Elected President
Patricio Aylwin
PDC
- Chamber of Deputies
- All 120 seats in the Chamber of Deputies; 61 seats needed for a majority
- Turnout: 94.73% (▲12.98pp)
Party	Vote %	Seats
Concertación	51.49	69
Democracy and Progress	34.18	48
Unity for Democracy	5.31	2
Independents	1.88	1
This lists parties that won seats. See the complete results below.
- Senate
- 38 of the 47 seats in the Senate
- Turnout: 94.73%
Party	Vote %	Seats
Concertación	54.63	22
Democracy and Progress	34.85	16
This lists parties that won seats. See the complete results below.

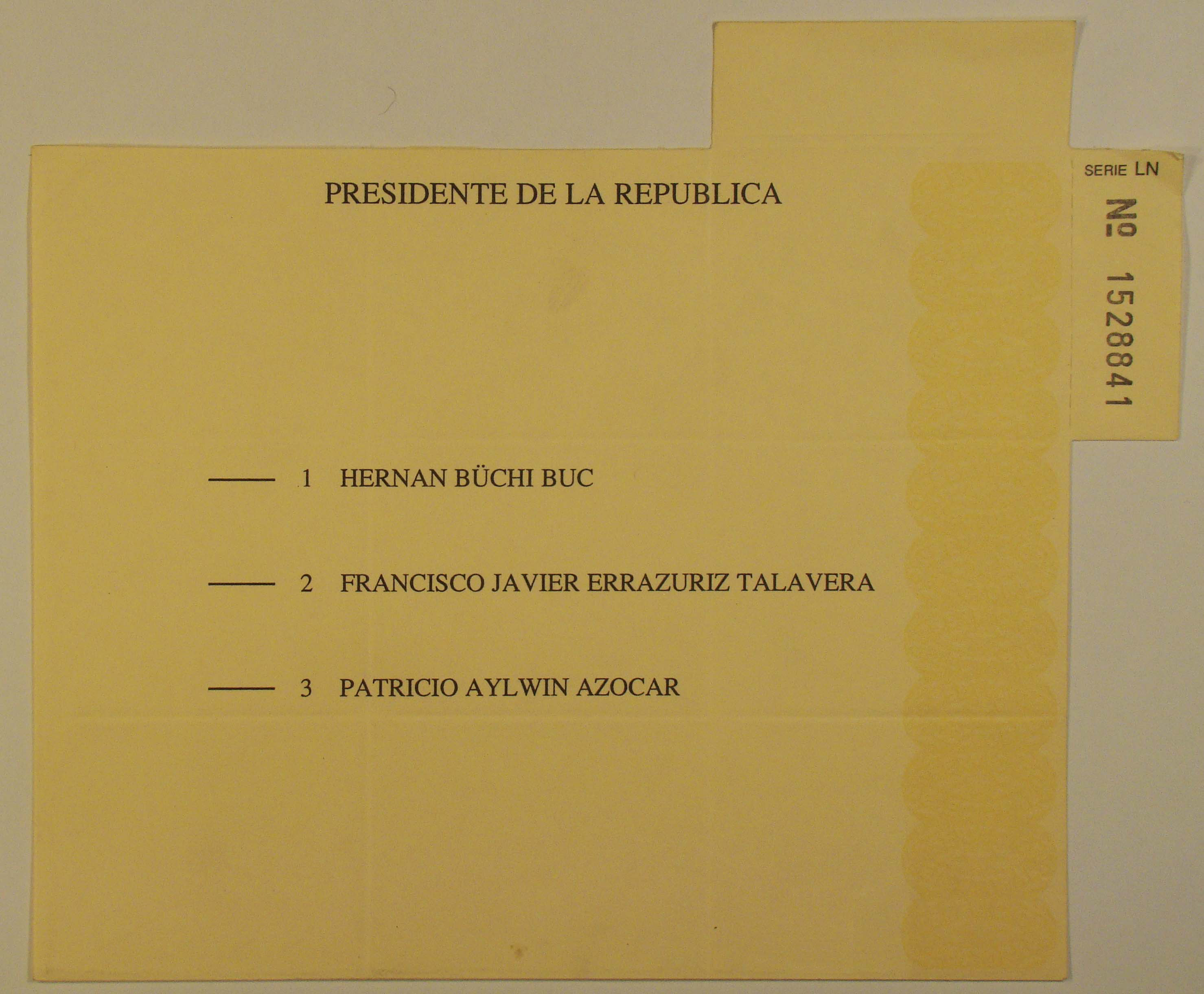
Presidential election ballot paper

General elections were held in Chile on 14 December 1989, bringing an end to the military regime that had been in place since 1973. Patricio Aylwin of Concertación alliance was elected President, whilst the alliance also won a majority of seats in the Chamber of Deputies and in the elected Senate seats.

From the 1989 elections onwards the military had officially left the political future of the country to civilians to be elected. Pinochet did not endorse any candidate publicly. Former dictatorship minister Hernán Büchi ran for president as candidate of the two right-wing parties, RN and UDI. He had little political experience and was a relatively young (40 years) technocrat credited for Chile's good economic performance in the later half of the 1980s. The right parties faced several problems in the elections: there was considerable infighting between RN and UDI, Büchi had only very reluctantly accepted to run for president and right-wing politicians struggled to define their position towards the Pinochet regime. In addition to this right-wing populist Francisco Javier Errázuriz Talavera ran independently for president and made several election promises Büchi could not match.

== Definition of candidacies ==
=== Concertación ===
Candidate Aylwin prevailed in a political negotiation within the so-called Concertación de Partidos por la Democracia, which at that time was made up of 17 political movements opposed to the military dictatorship. However, the process was not simple. The situation of each party was as follows:

- Patricio Aylwin had to prevail within the Christian Democratic Party (PDC) itself against two other contenders: Eduardo Frei Ruiz-Tagle and Gabriel Valdés Subercaseaux. It was a controversial process, saturated with accusations, including an episode involving the theft of internal voting records known as "Carmengate" (named as such for the then-address of the headquarters of the PDC, Carmen 8, in Downtown Santiago). During this process, Andrés Zaldívar was even proposed as a consensus candidate. Aylwin ultimately secured the support of his party and was proclaimed on February 5.
- The Radical Party put forward its leader Enrique Silva Cimma, who withdrew his candidacy on June 10 to support Patricio Aylwin.
- The Social Democracy Party put forward the candidacy of the lawyer Eugenio Velasco, who later withdrew his bid and on July 3 announced his support for Aylwin.
- The renewed sector of the Socialist Party (PS-Núñez) and the Party for Democracy put forward the figure of Ricardo Lagos, known for having confronted General Pinochet through television cameras. Both parties officially announced their support for Aylwin’s candidacy on June 23.
- The Humanist Party presented, in a testimonial manner, the candidacy of Laura Rodríguez, who at the time was below the required age to be a candidate. Subsequently, together with The Greens, it put forward José Tomás Sáenz as its candidate.
- The Socialist Party–Almeyda proclaimed Aylwin as its candidate on June 23.
- The candidacy of the independent Alejandro Hales also emerged, president of the Independents for the No movement, supported by the Almeyda faction of the Socialist Party.

The national organization, ideological moderation, and relative weight within the coalition ultimately led the Christian Democratic Party to determine the presidential candidacy. In this decision, the media prominence of Patricio Aylwin—when he previously obtained the nomination as spokesperson or “primus inter pares” among the leaders of the Concertación for the 1988 plebiscite—was influential, allowing him to secure the coalition’s backing over alternatives from the moderate left such as Ricardo Lagos, Alejandro Hales, and Enrique Silva Cimma, which were reconsidered toward the end of the process.

Aylwin’s nomination as the Concertación’s candidate took place on July 6—having already been proclaimed as their candidate by the Party of the Center Alliance on June 28 and by the Democratic Socialist Radical Party on July 2, as well as by the Christian Left on July 4—,while his formal proclamation was held on July 16, 1989, at the Teatro Caupolicán, a symbol of democratic resistance during the military dictatorship, under the slogan “The people win.”On August 2, the Broad Party of Socialist Left (PAIS) proclaimed Aylwin as its candidate.

=== Democracy and Progress ===
Supporters of Augusto Pinochet’s military dictatorship also underwent a lengthy process of deliberation to designate their candidate. The figure of Hernán Büchi—Minister of Finance and ideologue of the neoliberal reforms reintroduced in Chile after the 1982 crisis—generated sympathy due to his youthful image and his close association with the country’s supposedly successful economic recovery. However, Büchi systematically refused to accept the option of being a candidate and declined to do so in a speech delivered on May 15, 1989, which went down in Chilean political history, as he acknowledged that between his personality and the responsibility being imposed on him there existed a “vital contradiction,” thus renouncing his pre-candidacy.

In that context, on August 6 National Renewal designated former Interior Minister Sergio Onofre Jarpa as its nominee through an internal vote in which he obtained 272 votes in favor, 3 against, and one blank;the Radical Democracy did the same with former senator Julio Durán Neumann, while the UDI proclaimed Hernán Büchi despite his refusal.

Büchi finally accepted being a candidate on July 11,and in a political negotiation, the Democracy and Progress pact and the Radical Democracy partynamed him as their nominee under the slogan “Büchi is the man.” On August 10, he received the formal backing of National Renewal, which withdrew the support it had given to Sergio Onofre Jarpa only four days earlier.

His campaign “generalissimo” was former Pinochet minister and businessman Pablo Baraona, who assumed that role for economic coordination and as a member of the coalition’s main party, National Renewal. In its initial stage, the position was held by Sebastián Piñera, also a member of National Renewal, who did not assume that role in the final candidacy.

=== Francisco Javier Errázuriz Talavera ===
However, the right did not expect a third option to emerge. Businessman Francisco Javier Errázuriz Talavera carried forward his presidential candidacy outside the political parties. Declaring himself independent, he stated that he had “voted Yes with his heart in the No” in the 1988 plebiscite, and he sought a platform close to the political center to capture votes. He was supported by the Liberal Party, the Chilean Socialist Party (an instrumental party that supported the Yes, and unrelated to the current Socialist Party), and the National Advance party, as well as the National Party and the Party of the South, all parties with local leadership and limited media reach. The campaign slogan was: “Errázuriz, the opportunity for a dignified Chile,” and his campaign generalissimo was Carlos Concha.

=== Failed candidacies ===
- The independent candidacy of the physician and philanthropist Fernando Monckeberg Barros was rejected on August 24, 1989, after his registration with the Electoral Service, for exceeding, in his lists of sponsoring voters, the percentage permitted by law of sponsors registered in political parties.
- In some media outlets, the Independent National Unity candidacy of television host Mario Kreutzberger, “Don Francisco,” associated with the philanthropic work of the Teletón, was proposed. The presenter flatly rejected the possibility.
- The leader of the Party of Pensioners, Juan Antonio Torres Araya, was sounded out as a presidential candidate; however, he did not achieve the party’s legalization nor gather the necessary signatures to present his candidacy.

== Debate ==
The only presidential debate took place in the main studios of Channel 13 on October 9, 1989. It was moderated by Hernán Precht and featured journalists Rosario Guzmán Errázuriz, Bernardo de la Maza, Raquel Correa, and Claudio Sánchez Venegas, whose role was to ask questions to the candidates Hernán Büchi and Patricio Aylwin. The debate, which was the first to be televised in the history of Chile and Latin America, did not include the participation of candidate Francisco Javier Errázuriz, since, as Claudio Sánchez would later explain, “we could hold a debate with four candidates, but with three it was more complicated” (alluding to the rejected candidacy of Fernando Monckeberg). According to Sánchez, Errázuriz’s absence from the debate was offset by dedicating an additional episode of the program Decisión 89 to the businessman’s candidacy.

== Polling ==
Encuesta	Fecha	Aylwin	Büchi	Errázuriz	Blank/Invalid
CERC	July 1989	53,8 %	28,3 %	9 %	
Carta Confidencial	September 8–9, 1989	43,8 %	35,2 %	13,2 %	
CEP/Adimark	October 20, 1989	47,4 %	30,2 %	11,4 %	3,5 %
Gemines	October 23, 1989	58,3 %	28,7 %	8,4 %	
FLACSO	October 25, 1989	52,5 %	28,7 %	8,7 %	
CERC	November 1989	56,4 %	27,5 %	14,1 %	2 %
Comando H. Büchi	November 17, 1989	34,5 %	39,3 %	9,1 %	
Gemines	November 17 / November 24, 1989	56 %	28,7 %	12,6 %	
CIS	November 18, 1989	56,8 %	22,8 %	8,6 %	
CERC	November 24, 1989	56 %	31,2 %	9,8 %	
Sevac	December 8, 1989	40,6 %	30,1 %	12,7 %	
Investmerk	December 8, 1989	42,6 %	33,2 %	12,1 %	
Consultores Asociados	December 9, 1989	50,8 %	34,4 %	10,7 %	
Gallup	December 11, 1989	50,9 %	28,5 %	20,6 %	
Gemines	December 11, 1989	55,9 %	29,1 %	12,4 %	
Investigaciones	December 11, 1989	44 %	31 %	19 %	
Bestland	December 12, 1989	42,9 %	25,6 %	9,8 %	
CERC	December 12, 1989	57 %	25 %	16 %	

== Results ==
=== President ===
Candidate	Party	Votes	%
Patricio Aylwin	Concertación (PDC)	3,850,571	55.17
Hernán Büchi	Democracy and Progress (Ind.)	2,052,116	29.40
Francisco Javier Errázuriz	Independent	1,077,172	15.43
Total		6,979,859	100.00
Valid votes		6,979,859	97.50
Invalid/blank votes		178,868	2.50
Total votes		7,158,727	100.00
Registered voters/turnout		7,557,537	94.72
Source: SERVEL

==== By region ====
Region		Aylwin	%	Büchi	%	Errázuriz	%
I	Tarapacá	82,387	49.66	52,293	31.52	31,224	18.82
II	Antofagasta	120,679	57.63	52,023	24.84	36,710	17.53
III	Atacama	67,803	60.67	33,856	30.30	10,094	9.03
IV	Coquimbo	141,318	57.18	75,795	30.67	30,020	12.15
V	Valparaíso	398,096	52.61	219,152	28.96	139,505	18.43
VI	O'Higgins	215,945	58.65	109,155	29.65	43,072	11.70
VII	Maule	251,809	57.04	125,695	28.47	63,944	14.49
VIII	Biobío	505,439	56.29	223,677	24.91	168,792	18.80
IX	Araucanía	186,200	47.16	112,964	28.61	95,654	24.23
X	Los Lagos	242,071	51.08	137,360	28.99	94,466	19.93
XI	Aysén	20,390	54.72	11,556	31.01	5,319	14.27
XII	Magallanes	48,910	60.37	23,941	29.55	8,162	10.07
RM	Santiago Metropolitan	1,569,524	56.17	874,649	31.30	350,210	12.53
Total: 6,979,859		3,850,571	55.17	2,052,116	29.40	1,077,172	15.43

=== Senate ===
Party or alliance		Votes	%	Seats
Concertación	Christian Democratic Party	2,188,329	32.18	13
Concertación	Party for Democracy	820,393	12.06	4
Concertación	Radical Party of Chile	147,364	2.17	2
Concertación	Humanist Party	35,534	0.52	0
Concertación	Independents	523,369	7.70	3
Concertación	Total	3,714,989	54.63	22
Democracy and Progress	National Renewal	731,678	10.76	5
Democracy and Progress	Independent Democratic Union	347,445	5.11	2
Democracy and Progress	Independents	1,290,886	18.98	9
Democracy and Progress	Total	2,370,009	34.85	16
Liberal–Socialist	Liberal Party	10,129	0.15	0
Liberal–Socialist	Chilean Socialist Party	4,254	0.06	0
Liberal–Socialist	Independents	199,618	2.94	0
Liberal–Socialist	Total	214,001	3.15	0
Alliance of the Centre	Radical Democracy	28,695	0.42	0
Alliance of the Centre	National Advance	697	0.01	0
Alliance of the Centre	Independents	62,015	0.91	0
Alliance of the Centre	Total	91,407	1.34	0
Broad Party of Socialist Left		288,397	4.24	0
Party of the South		45,584	0.67	0
National Party		43,741	0.64	0
Independents		32,282	0.47	0
Appointed senators				9
Total		6,800,410	100.00	47
Valid votes		6,800,410	95.00	
Invalid/blank votes		358,032	5.00	
Total votes		7,158,442	100.00	
Registered voters/turnout		7,556,613	94.73	
Source: Nohlen

==== By region ====
Region		Constituency		Concertación	Democracy and Progress	Party of the South	Alliance of the Centre	Liberal–Socialist	National	Unity for Democracy	Independent
I	Tarapacá	I	Tarapacá	47.13%	30.64%	0.00%	0.00%	3.85%	0.00%	0.00%	18.37%
II	Antofagasta	II	Antofagasta	41.38%	34.81%	0.00%	0.00%	0.00%	0.00%	23.81%	0.00%
III	Atacama	III	Atacama	61.82%	33.36%	0.00%	0.00%	2.45%	0.00%	0.00%	2.37%
IV	Coquimbo	IV	Coquimbo	36.85%	35.82%	0.00%	5.63%	0.00%	0.00%	21.70%	0.00%
V	Valparaíso	V	Valparaíso Cordillera	48.77%	35.20%	0.00%	0.00%	7.49%	0.00%	8.55%	0.00%
V	Valparaíso	VI	Valparaíso Costa	48.77%	35.20%	0.00%	0.00%	7.49%	0.00%	8.55%	0.00%
RM	Santiago Metropolitan	VII	Metropolitana Poniente	59.90%	35.03%	0.00%	0.00%	4.24%	0.83%	0.00%	0.00%
RM	Santiago Metropolitan	VIII	Metropolitana Oriente	59.90%	35.03%	0.00%	0.00%	4.24%	0.83%	0.00%	0.00%
VI	O'Higgins	IX	O'Higgins	59.22%	27.54%	0.00%	11.22%	2.02%	0.00%	0.00%	0.00%
VII	Maule	X	Maule Norte	59.61%	34.23%	0.00%	0.00%	6.17%	0.00%	0.00%	0.00%
VII	Maule	XI	Maule Sur	59.61%	34.23%	0.00%	0.00%	6.17%	0.00%	0.00%	0.00%
VIII	Biobío	XII	Biobío Costa	46.90%	34.76%	0.00%	4.01%	0.00%	0.00%	14.33%	0.00%
VIII	Biobío	XIII	Biobío Cordillera	46.90%	34.76%	0.00%	4.01%	0.00%	0.00%	14.33%	0.00%
IX	Araucanía	XIV	Araucanía Norte	49.95%	32.77%	11.84%	0.00%	0.00%	5.44%	0.00%	0.00%
IX	Araucanía	XV	Araucanía Sur	49.95%	32.77%	11.84%	0.00%	0.00%	5.44%	0.00%	0.00%
X	Los Lagos	XVI	Los Lagos Norte	57.04%	42.96%	0.00%	0.00%	0.00%	0.00%	0.00%	0.00%
X	Los Lagos	XVII	Los Lagos Sur	57.04%	42.96%	0.00%	0.00%	0.00%	0.00%	0.00%	0.00%
XI	Aysén	XVIII	Aysén	55.99%	40.78%	0.00%	1.91%	1.31%	0.00%	0.00%	0.00%
XII	Magallanes	XIX	Magallanes	66.23%	31.11%	0.00%	2.66%	0.00%	0.00%	0.00%	0.00%
Source: Servel Electoral

=== Chamber of Deputies ===
Party or alliance		Votes	%	Seats
Concertación	Christian Democratic Party	1,766,347	25.99	38
Concertación	Party for Democracy	778,501	11.45	16
Concertación	Radical Party of Chile	268,103	3.94	5
Concertación	Humanist Party	52,225	0.77	1
Concertación	The Greens	14,942	0.22	0
Concertación	Independents	619,595	9.12	9
Concertación	Total	3,499,713	51.49	69
Democracy and Progress	National Renewal	1,242,432	18.28	29
Democracy and Progress	Independent Democratic Union	667,369	9.82	11
Democracy and Progress	Independents	413,780	6.09	8
Democracy and Progress	Total	2,323,581	34.18	48
Unity for Democracy	Broad Party of Socialist Left	297,897	4.38	2
Unity for Democracy	Democratic Socialist Radical Party	1,330	0.02	0
Unity for Democracy	Independents	61,374	0.90	0
Unity for Democracy	Total	360,601	5.31	2
Liberal–Socialist	Liberal Party	47,237	0.69	0
Liberal–Socialist	Chilean Socialist Party	10,398	0.15	0
Liberal–Socialist	Independents	148,503	2.18	0
Liberal–Socialist	Total	206,138	3.03	0
Alliance of the Centre	National Advance	57,574	0.85	0
Alliance of the Centre	Radical Democracy	28,575	0.42	0
Alliance of the Centre	Independents	91,793	1.35	0
Alliance of the Centre	Total	177,942	2.62	0
National Party		53,819	0.79	0
Party of the South		47,387	0.70	0
Independents		127,941	1.88	1
Total		6,797,122	100.00	120
Valid votes		6,797,122	94.95	
Invalid/blank votes		361,524	5.05	
Total votes		7,158,646	100.00	
Registered voters/turnout		7,556,613	94.73	
Source: SERVEL

==== By region ====
Region		District		Concertación	Democracy and Progress	Party of the South	Alliance of the Centre	Liberal–Socialist	National	Unity for Democracy	Independent
I	Tarapacá	1	Arica	47.70%	37.16%	0.00%	1.84%	4.68%	0.00%	7.52%	1.10%
I	Tarapacá	2	Iquique	47.70%	37.16%	0.00%	1.84%	4.68%	0.00%	7.52%	1.10%
II	Antofagasta	3	Calama	59.78%	30.32%	0.00%	1.62%	4.58%	0.00%	0.00%	3.70%
II	Antofagasta	4	Antofagasta	59.78%	30.32%	0.00%	1.62%	4.58%	0.00%	0.00%	3.70%
III	Atacama	5	Copiapó	44.50%	32.02%	0.00%	2.09%	2.76%	0.00%	16.88%	1.76%
III	Atacama	6	Vallenar	44.50%	32.02%	0.00%	2.09%	2.76%	0.00%	16.88%	1.76%
IV	Coquimbo	7	La Serena	57.73%	33.71%	0.00%	4.68%	0.00%	0.00%	0.00%	3.88%
IV	Coquimbo	8	Coquimbo	57.73%	33.71%	0.00%	4.68%	0.00%	0.00%	0.00%	3.88%
IV	Coquimbo	9	Illapel	57.73%	33.71%	0.00%	4.68%	0.00%	0.00%	0.00%	3.88%
V	Valparaíso	10	Quillota	49.69%	35.35%	0.00%	3.60%	4.16%	0.00%	6.27%	0.94%
V	Valparaíso	11	Los Andes	49.69%	35.35%	0.00%	3.60%	4.16%	0.00%	6.27%	0.94%
V	Valparaíso	12	Quilpué	49.69%	35.35%	0.00%	3.60%	4.16%	0.00%	6.27%	0.94%
V	Valparaíso	13	Valparaíso	49.69%	35.35%	0.00%	3.60%	4.16%	0.00%	6.27%	0.94%
V	Valparaíso	14	Viña del Mar	49.69%	35.35%	0.00%	3.60%	4.16%	0.00%	6.27%	0.94%
V	Valparaíso	15	San Antonio	49.69%	35.35%	0.00%	3.60%	4.16%	0.00%	6.27%	0.94%
RM	Santiago Metropolitan	16	Pudahuel	52.70%	34.53%	0.00%	1.69%	5.36%	0.49%	4.40%	0.84%
RM	Santiago Metropolitan	17	Conchalí	52.70%	34.53%	0.00%	1.69%	5.36%	0.49%	4.40%	0.84%
RM	Santiago Metropolitan	18	Cerro Navia	52.70%	34.53%	0.00%	1.69%	5.36%	0.49%	4.40%	0.84%
RM	Santiago Metropolitan	19	Independencia	52.70%	34.53%	0.00%	1.69%	5.36%	0.49%	4.40%	0.84%
RM	Santiago Metropolitan	20	Maipú	52.70%	34.53%	0.00%	1.69%	5.36%	0.49%	4.40%	0.84%
RM	Santiago Metropolitan	21	Providencia	52.70%	34.53%	0.00%	1.69%	5.36%	0.49%	4.40%	0.84%
RM	Santiago Metropolitan	22	Santiago	52.70%	34.53%	0.00%	1.69%	5.36%	0.49%	4.40%	0.84%
RM	Santiago Metropolitan	23	Las Condes	52.70%	34.53%	0.00%	1.69%	5.36%	0.49%	4.40%	0.84%
RM	Santiago Metropolitan	24	La Reina	52.70%	34.53%	0.00%	1.69%	5.36%	0.49%	4.40%	0.84%
RM	Santiago Metropolitan	25	La Granja	52.70%	34.53%	0.00%	1.69%	5.36%	0.49%	4.40%	0.84%
RM	Santiago Metropolitan	26	La Florida	52.70%	34.53%	0.00%	1.69%	5.36%	0.49%	4.40%	0.84%
RM	Santiago Metropolitan	27	La Cisterna	52.70%	34.53%	0.00%	1.69%	5.36%	0.49%	4.40%	0.84%
RM	Santiago Metropolitan	28	San Miguel	52.70%	34.53%	0.00%	1.69%	5.36%	0.49%	4.40%	0.84%
RM	Santiago Metropolitan	29	Puente Alto	52.70%	34.53%	0.00%	1.69%	5.36%	0.49%	4.40%	0.84%
RM	Santiago Metropolitan	30	San Bernardo	52.70%	34.53%	0.00%	1.69%	5.36%	0.49%	4.40%	0.84%
RM	Santiago Metropolitan	31	Melipilla	52.70%	34.53%	0.00%	1.69%	5.36%	0.49%	4.40%	0.84%
VI	O'Higgins	32	Rancagua	47.34%	33.10%	0.00%	3.21%	2.50%	0.00%	13.15%	0.71%
VI	O'Higgins	33	Rengo	47.34%	33.10%	0.00%	3.21%	2.50%	0.00%	13.15%	0.71%
VI	O'Higgins	34	San Fernando	47.34%	33.10%	0.00%	3.21%	2.50%	0.00%	13.15%	0.71%
VI	O'Higgins	35	Santa Cruz	47.34%	33.10%	0.00%	3.21%	2.50%	0.00%	13.15%	0.71%
VII	Maule	36	Curicó	58.70%	32.47%	0.00%	2.13%	0.00%	1.76%	0.00%	4.94%
VII	Maule	37	Talca	58.70%	32.47%	0.00%	2.13%	0.00%	1.76%	0.00%	4.94%
VII	Maule	38	Constitución	58.70%	32.47%	0.00%	2.13%	0.00%	1.76%	0.00%	4.94%
VII	Maule	39	Linares	58.70%	32.47%	0.00%	2.13%	0.00%	1.76%	0.00%	4.94%
VII	Maule	40	Cauquenes	58.70%	32.47%	0.00%	2.13%	0.00%	1.76%	0.00%	4.94%
VIII	Biobío	41	Chillán	47.08%	33.61%	0.00%	5.51%	0.00%	0.00%	8.83%	4.97%
VIII	Biobío	42	Quillón	47.08%	33.61%	0.00%	5.51%	0.00%	0.00%	8.83%	4.97%
VIII	Biobío	43	Talcahuano	47.08%	33.61%	0.00%	5.51%	0.00%	0.00%	8.83%	4.97%
VIII	Biobío	44	Concepción	47.08%	33.61%	0.00%	5.51%	0.00%	0.00%	8.83%	4.97%
VIII	Biobío	45	Coronel	47.08%	33.61%	0.00%	5.51%	0.00%	0.00%	8.83%	4.97%
VIII	Biobío	46	Lota	47.08%	33.61%	0.00%	5.51%	0.00%	0.00%	8.83%	4.97%
VIII	Biobío	47	Los Ángeles	47.08%	33.61%	0.00%	5.51%	0.00%	0.00%	8.83%	4.97%
IX	Araucanía	48	Angol	45.51%	32.95%	9.27%	1.61%	0.00%	4.72%	4.50%	1.43%
IX	Araucanía	49	Lautaro	45.51%	32.95%	9.27%	1.61%	0.00%	4.72%	4.50%	1.43%
IX	Araucanía	50	Temuco	45.51%	32.95%	9.27%	1.61%	0.00%	4.72%	4.50%	1.43%
IX	Araucanía	51	Nueva Imperial	45.51%	32.95%	9.27%	1.61%	0.00%	4.72%	4.50%	1.43%
IX	Araucanía	52	Villarrica	45.51%	32.95%	9.27%	1.61%	0.00%	4.72%	4.50%	1.43%
X	Los Lagos	53	Valdivia	51.88%	36.87%	2.59%	0.17%	0.00%	3.16%	4.23%	1.10%
X	Los Lagos	54	La Unión	51.88%	36.87%	2.59%	0.17%	0.00%	3.16%	4.23%	1.10%
X	Los Lagos	55	Osorno	51.88%	36.87%	2.59%	0.17%	0.00%	3.16%	4.23%	1.10%
X	Los Lagos	56	Puerto Varas	51.88%	36.87%	2.59%	0.17%	0.00%	3.16%	4.23%	1.10%
X	Los Lagos	57	Puerto Montt	51.88%	36.87%	2.59%	0.17%	0.00%	3.16%	4.23%	1.10%
X	Los Lagos	58	Castro	51.88%	36.87%	2.59%	0.17%	0.00%	3.16%	4.23%	1.10%
XI	Aysén	59	Coyhaique	45.79%	39.75%	0.74%	1.54%	0.78%	1.84%	9.57%	0.00%
XII	Magallanes	60	Punta Arenas	65.03%	31.58%	0.00%	3.39%	0.00%	0.00%	0.00%	0.00%
Source: Servel Electoral
