= Radical Democracy (Chile) =

Defunct political party in Chile

Radical Democracy Democracia Radical
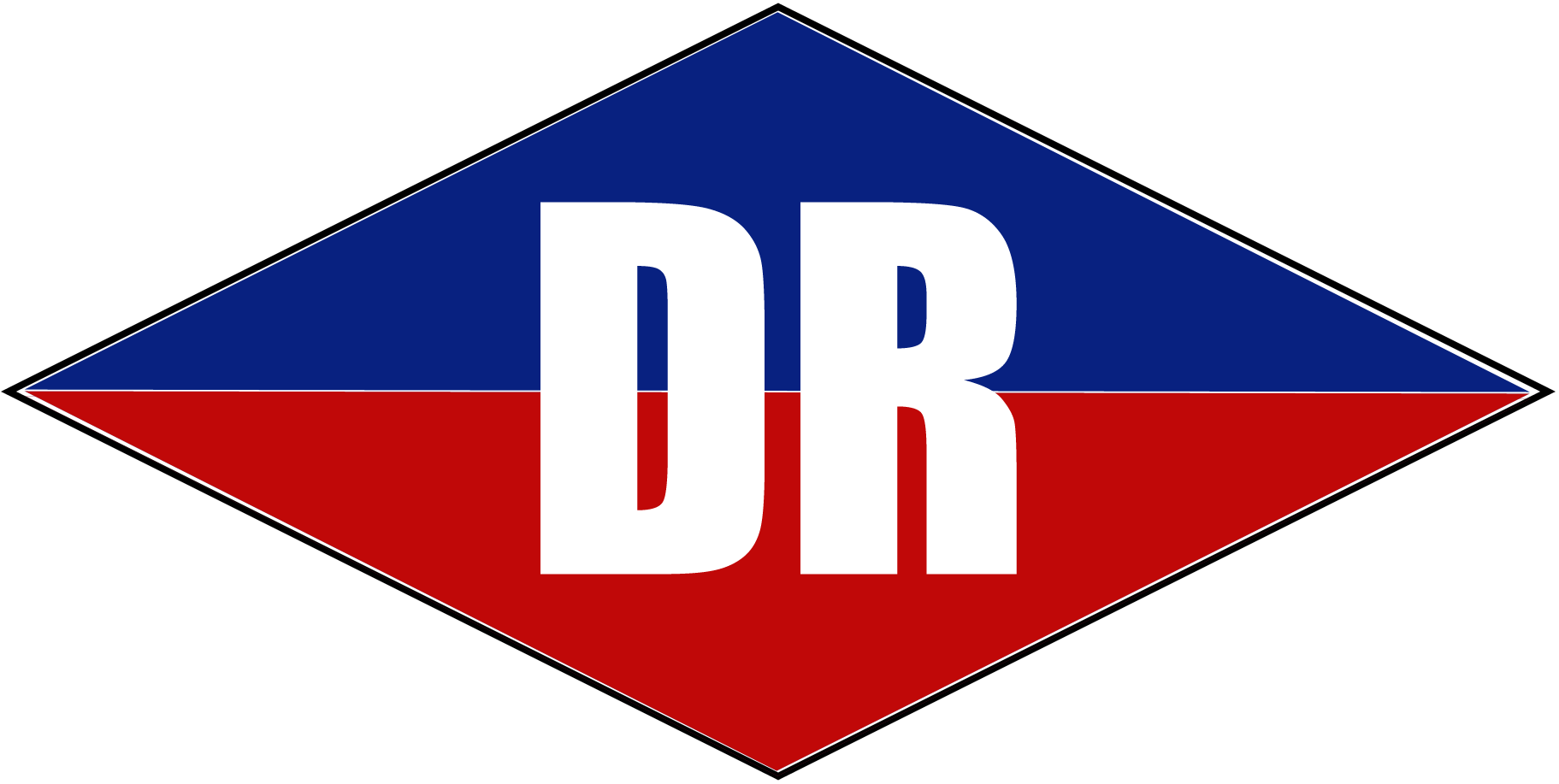
- Leaders: Julio Durán, Julio Mercado Illanes, Alfonso Quintana
- Founded: November 22, 1969
- Dissolved: July 17, 1990
- Split from: Radical Party
- Merged into: National Democracy of Centre
- Headquarters: Santiago de Chile
- Ideology: Radicalism; Social liberalism Classical liberalism Anti-communism
- Political position: Centre-right
- National affiliation: Confederation of Democracy (1972–73); National Democratic Agreement (1984–85)
- Colors: Blue, red, white
- Slogan: Un partido de centro, con raíces en la historia

The Radical Democracy (Spanish: Democracia Radical, DR) was a Chilean centre-right political party. The party, created in 1969, was dissolved in 1973, and reappeared in 1983 before disbanding permanently in 1990.

== History ==
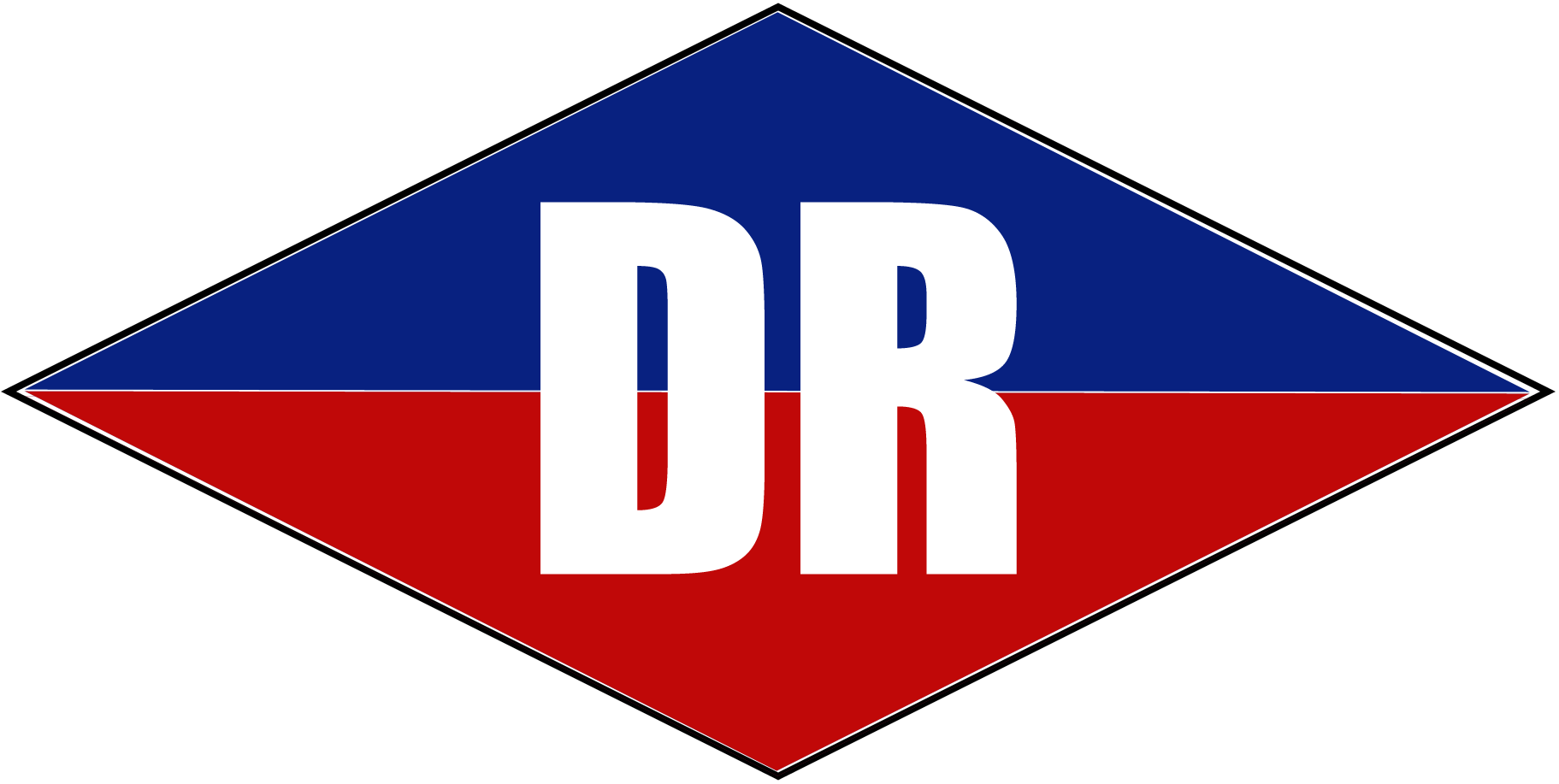
Radical Democracy symbol, 1971

The party was composed of Radicals who opposed the presidential candidacy of the Marxist Salvador Allende. It represented the anti-communist sector of the Radicals that separated themselves permanently from the Radical Party. The group was initially known as the Movement for Democratic Unity. It supported the presidential candidacy of independent right-winger Jorge Alessandri in 1970.

A firm opponent to Salvador Allende, Radical Democracy took part in the parliamentary elections of 1973 as part of the anti-Allende CODE coalition. The party supported the military coup of 1973, voluntarily complying with its own dissolution that same year. Among its most notable members were Julio Durán Neumann (presidential candidate for Radical Party in 1964), Domingo Durán, Ángel Faivovich, Julio Mercado, and Rafael Señoret.

Unlike its pre-1973 period, the party was reduced due to the departure of some iconic militants. Ángel Faivovich and Germán Picó Cañas entered the National Labour Front, a movement that later became the National Renewal. Other members, such as former deputy Julio Mercado Illanes, returned to the central trunk of the Radical Party.

In 1984 it joined with other movements that supported the military dictatorship a coalition known as the Group of Eight (Grupo de los Ocho), which later evolved to the National Democratic Agreement.

On January 31, 1986, it constituted the Frente Democrático de Concordia (FREDECO) along with the Social Democracy Party, the Social Christian Movement, the National Democratic Party (faction led by Apolonides Parra), the Radical Civic Union, the Social Democratic Labour Movement, the Javiera Carrera Movement and Arturo Matte Civic Center.

In late 1988 it created the short-lived Democratic Confederation (Confederación Democrática) with the National Party (a faction that supported Pinochet), the Liberal Democrat Party of Chile, the Social Democrat Party, the National Advance, the Democratic Party of Chile, the Free Democratic Centre and the Civic Committees. The confederation disappeared in 1989 during negotiations for parliamentary candidates that year.

In 1989 the party supported the presidential candidacy of Hernán Büchi, who was supported by the Democracy and Progress pact. Despite this, he did not go into this coalition and had to participate in an electoral alliance with the National Advance nationalist party called Alliance of Centre, leading candidates for deputy and senator for some regions. Because scored less than 5% of the voting of deputies required by law, the party was declared in dissolution, which was corrected when it merged with National Advance and the National Party in the National Democracy of Centre party, in May 1990.

== Electoral results ==
Election year (Total MPs)	Seats in Parliament	Number of votes	Percent of the vote
1973 (150)	2	83,328	2.3
1989 (120)	0	28,575	0.42

== Presidential candidates ==
The following is a list of the presidential candidates supported by the Radical Democracy Party. (Information gathered from the Archive of Chilean Elections).

- 1970: Jorge Alessandri (lost)
- 1988 plebiscite: In favor of Augusto Pinochet (lost)
- 1989: Hernán Büchi (lost)

== See also ==
- Category:Radical Democracy (Chile) politicians
