= Broad Party of Socialist Left =

Defunct political party in Chile

Broad Party of Socialist Left Partido Amplio de Izquierda Socialista
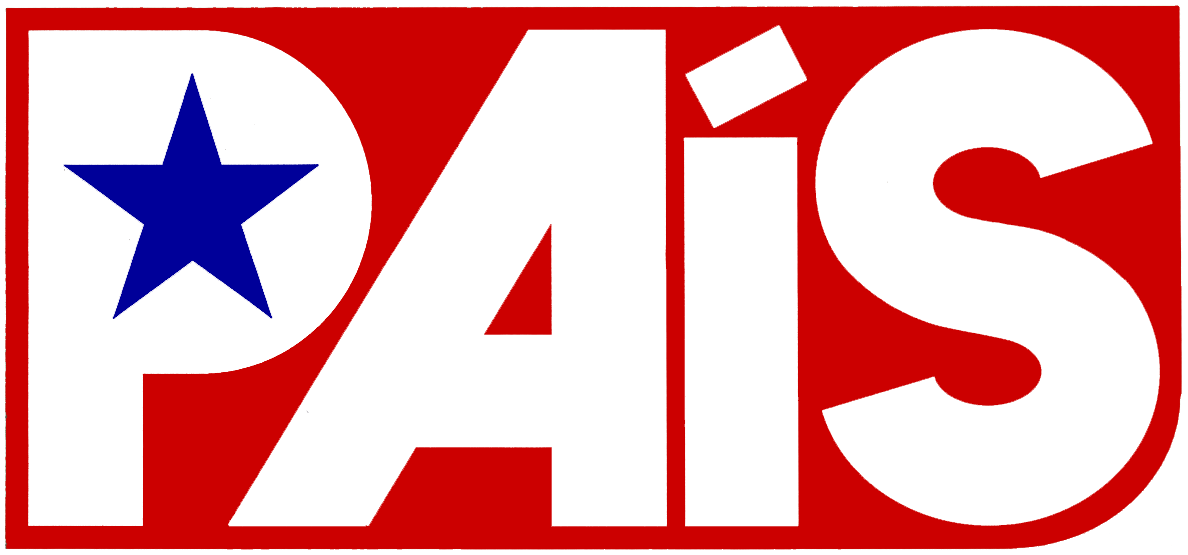
- President: Luis Maira
- Founded: 17 December 1988
- Dissolved: 12 March 1990
- Merged into: Socialist Party of Chile
- Headquarters: Santiago, Chile
- Ideology: Socialism; Marxism; Democratic socialism
- Political position: Left-wing
- National affiliation: Unity for the Democracy (1989–1990)

The Broad Party of Socialist Left (Spanish: Partido Amplio de Izquierda Socialista, PAIS) was a left-wing political party of Chile that operated from December 1988 to March 1990. Its existed to sign up candidates of the Communist Party (at that time could not sign up) Christian Left, MAPU and PS-Almeyda, all former members of the United Left.

The president of PAIS was Luis Maira and its leadership at the national, regional and community level was divided proportionally among the members of parties that were still functioning as independent organizations.

The party was declared as a "formation party" by the Electoral Service of Chile on 17 December 1988, and was officially registered as a legal political party on 15 April 1989.

For the parliamentary elections of 1989 the party formed the electoral Unity for Democracy coalition with the Democratic Socialist Radical Party (PRSD) and having reached an agreement with the Concertación in complementing or may not present strong candidates. In choosing obtained two deputies, Juan Pablo Letelier in District 33, and Juan Martínez Sepúlveda in 45 district.

The reunification of the Socialists that incorporated members of the IC and MAPU to the Socialist Party cost the PAIS its purpose and it dissolved. At the same time, the Communist Party returned to work after years of being banned.

== Presidential candidates ==
The following is a list of the presidential candidates supported by the Broad Party of Socialist Left. (Information gathered from the Archive of Chilean Elections).

- 1989: Patricio Aylwin (won)
