= José Tohá =

Chilean journalist, lawyer and politician

Minister of National Defense
- In office 28 January 1972 – 5 July 1973
- President: Salvador Allende
- Preceded by: Alejandro Ríos Valdivia
- Succeeded by: Clodomiro Almeyda

Minister of the Interior
- In office 3 November 1970 – 22 January 1972
- President: Salvador Allende
- Preceded by: Patricio Rojas
- Succeeded by: Alejandro Ríos Valdivia

Personal details
- Born: José Tohá González; 6 February 1927 Chillán, Chile
- Died: 15 March 1974 (aged 47) Santiago, Chile
- Cause of death: Murder by strangulation
- Resting place: Cementerio General de Santiago
- Party: Socialist Party of Chile
- Spouse: Victoria Morales Etchevers (m. 1963)
- Children: Carolina Tohá; Jose Tohá
- Relatives: Jaime Tohá (brother)
- Education: University of Chile
- Profession: Lawyer

José Tohá González (February 6, 1927 – March 15, 1974) was a Chilean journalist, lawyer, and politician for the Socialist Party. Arrested during the 1973 Chilean coup d'état, Tohá was later murdered by members of the Chilean Air Force.

== Biography ==
Tohá was born in Chillán, the son of Spanish immigrant José Tohá Soldavilla and of Brunilda González Monteagudo. After completing his secondary studies in his natal city, he studied law at the Universidad de Chile. While there, he was president of the University of Chile Student Federation (FECh) between 1950–1951. In 1958, he joined the staff of the newspaper Última Hora, and in 1960 he became its editor and majority owner, a position he held until 1970.

In 1942, while still a high school student, Tohá joined the Socialist Party of Chile (PS). He rose to member of its Central Committee, and worked in all four of Salvador Allende's presidential campaigns in 1952, 1958, 1964 and 1970. As the first democratically elected socialist president, President Salvador Allende named Tohá his first Minister of the Interior and vice president, a position he held until he was accused by Congress of tolerating the creation of left-wing paramilitary organizations. Allende responded by naming him Minister of Defense, a deliberate challenge to his right-wing detractors. As such, Tohá had to deal with the Tanquetazo putsch, the first attempt at a military-led coup d'état, on 29 June 1973.

During the coup d'état of September 11, 1973, Tohá was seized and arrested at La Moneda, where he had gone to support the defense of the democratic administration. He was held in different concentration camps suffering severe torture. After first being held at the Bernardo O'Higgins Military Academy, he was later sent for eight months to a concentration camp in Dawson Island. From there, he was transferred to the basement of the Air Force War Academy.

On 1 February 1974, Tohá was moved to room 303 at the Military Hospital in Santiago in a precarious state of health, suffering from acute attack of gastric ulcers. He recovered slightly and was able to share a few minutes with his wife and children on his 47th birthday on February 6. Despite his poor health, the military officers continued harassing him with endless torture and interrogation sessions. His physical state deteriorated, his weight dropped precipitously and he lost his eyesight. He could no longer walk nor take care of himself. The further interrogations in the Air Force’s War Academy only worsened his condition.

On March 15, at 12.55, he was found hanged inside the closet of his hospital room. The official explanation was that he had committed suicide "in the grip of a very strong nervous depression, with psycho-somatic effects". The family has never accepted that version, and claimed he was murdered. On 15 November 2010, 36 years after his death, the Court of Appeals of Santiago ordered an exhumation of Tohá's remains. A forensic study concluded that he did not commit suicide, but rather died as a result of "asphyxia due to manual strangulation of a homicidal nature". On 4 December 2015, Ramón Cáceres Jorquera and Sergio Contreras Mejías, two retired colonels of the Chilean Air Force, were found responsible for the torture of Tohá and sentenced to three years in prison.

After his death, his wife and children lived in exile in Mexico City for several years. His family returned to Chile in the early 80's, where his wife worked in the resistance to the Augusto Pinochet's military dictatorship.

=== Personal life ===
Tohá married Raquel Victoria Morales Etchevers (also known as Moy de Tohá) in 1963.

Political offices
Preceded by Patricio Rojas	Minister of the Interior; 1970-1972	Succeeded by Alejandro Ríos Valdivia
Preceded by Alejandro Ríos Valdivia	Minister of Defense; 1972-1973	Succeeded by Clodomiro Almeyda
