= Democratic Party of Chile (1988) =

Democratic Party of Chile Partido Democrático de Chile
- Leader: Apolonides Parra
- Founded: 16 June 1988
- Dissolved: 27 February 1989
- Split from: National Democratic Party
- Merged into: National Renewal
- Headquarters: Santiago de Chile
- Political position: Centre-right

The Democratic Party of Chile (Spanish: Partido Democrático de Chile, PADECH) was a Chilean political party that had legal existence from 1988 to 1989 as a "party in formation".

It was originally created by Apolonides Parra to rally the militants of the National Democratic Party (PADENA) who rejected the decision of the Minchel faction within PADEMA to support the "No" option in the plebiscite of 1988. PADECH started preparations for its establishment on 16 June 1988 and was declared as a "party in formation" July 27 of that year. It openly supported the option "Yes" in the referendum of October 5, 1988, which sought the continuation of the dictatorship of Augusto Pinochet, who had controlled Chile since 1973.

In late 1988 PADECH formed the short-lived Democratic Confederation (Spanish: Confederación Democrática) with the National Party (the "National Party for the Yes" faction), the Radical Democracy, the Social Democrat Party, the National Advance, the Liberal Democrat Party of Chile, the Free Democratic Centre and the Civic Committees. The confederation disappeared in 1989 during negotiations for parliamentary candidates that year.

After the "No" option won the 1988 referendum, the Electoral Service dissolved the PADECH party on 27 February 1989 for not complying with legal requirements, and many PADECH members joined the National Renewal (RN).
