= Ángel Faivovich =

Chilean politician

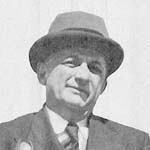

Member of the Senate of Chile
- In office 15 May 1949 – 15 May 1965

Member of the Chamber of Deputies of Chile
- In office 15 May 1937 – 15 May 1949

Personal details
- Born: 10 August 1901 Santiago, Chile
- Died: 9 May 1992 (aged 90) Santiago, Chile
- Party: Radical Party (1931–1969); Radical Democracy (1969–1973); Movimiento de Unidad Radical (1984–1985); National Labour Front (1985–1987); National Renewal (1987–1992)
- Spouse: Sara Drapkin
- Education: University of Chile (LL.B)
- Occupation: Politician
- Profession: Lawyer

Ángel Faivovich Hitzcovich (10 August 1901 – 9 May 1992) was a Chilean politician of Jewish descent who served as a senator.
