= Alejandro Navarro Brain =

Chilean politician (born 1958)

Alejandro Navarro
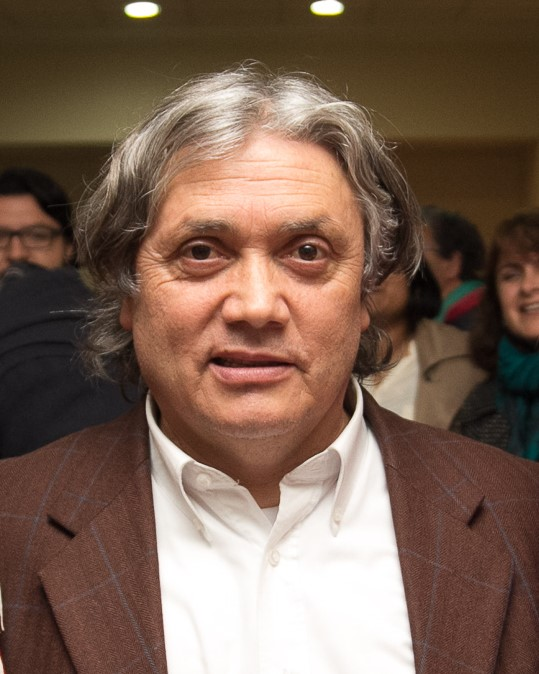

Member of the Senate of Chile
- In office 11 March 2006 – 11 March 2022
- Preceded by: José Antonio Viera-Gallo
- Constituency: Bio Bio Region

Member of the Chamber of Deputies
- In office 11 March 1994 – 11 March 2006
- Preceded by: Juan Martínez Sepúlveda
- Succeeded by: Clemira Pacheco
- Constituency: 45th District

Personal details
- Born: 20 November 1958 (age 67)
- Party: País
- Other political affiliations: Movimiento Amplio Social (until 2017)
- Domestic partner: Ana García Sciaraffia
- Children: 5
- Education: Pontifical Catholic University of Valparaíso (No degree); Catholic University of the Most Holy Conception (No degree); University of Concepción (BA)

Alejandro Navarro Brain (born 20 November 1958) is a Chilean politician who has served as a member of Parliament for the Bíobío Region since 1994.

In 2008, Navarro founded the Broad Social Movement (MAS in Spanish), and in 2009 ran briefly for President of Chile. He later left MAS to form País. With his partner Ana Garcia Sciaraffia, he has five children.

== Biography ==
Navarro is the eldest son of Fernando Navarro, a carpenter, and Lidia Brain, a housewife. From an early age, he learnt his father's profession, helping him with minor tasks at the house's workshop. He also learnt how to make kites, which he would sell with his mother in street markets. Navarro was educated first at the Recoleta Rafael Sanhueza Lizardi Primary School and then at the José Miguel Carrera Secondary School.

In early 1980s, Navarro had a brief spell at the Pontifical Catholic University of Valparaíso, where he studied geography, but abandoned this career due to economic problems.

In 1982, he was accepted by the University of Concepción to study pedagogy in philosophy. During these years, Navarro's character as a determined leader emerged, becoming the president of the university's students federation (FEC in Spanish). This was the first association that was born after the coup d'etat in 1973.

Navarro joined the Socialist Party in 1983, becoming a member of the Socialist Youth Central Comité. Years later he would become director of the region's Nacional Institute of the Youth (INJUV in Spanish). In 1988, he met his partner Ana Garcia, beginning a long relationship that lasts until now. Their first child, Araxza, was born in 1997. Navarro's other children are named America, Alonso, Antonio and Amaro.

== Political career ==
In 1994, Navarro was elected as a Bíobío Region 45th District's Deputy. He would then rise to prominence, serving as the citizen's voice in Chile's Chamber of Deputies while investigating large firms accused of fraud.

Navarro was re-elected at the same post, first in 1997 and again in 2001. At this later election, he won 47% of the votes, becoming the most voted deputy in the Bíobío Region and the third in the whole country.

In December 2005, Navarro was elected as Senator for the same region. At this election he got over 200,000 votes, which strengthened his position as a political figure, becoming the second most voted representative in Chile.

In 2008, after 26 years, he left the Socialist Party due to strong differences with the party leaders. A year later and together with prominent social, political and union leaders, Navarro founded the Broad Social Movement (MAS in Spanish), the first left wing party registered before the SERVEL since Salvador Allende's government. Months later, the same body proclaimed him as candidate for the Chilean Presidency. However, after a few weeks, he decided to continue with his parliamentary work and gave his support to another prospect.

In 2013 he was once again elected as representative for the Bíobío Region for the 2014-2022 period. He plans to run for president in the 2017 election for País.
