= Pedro Felipe Ramírez =

Chilean politician (born 1941)

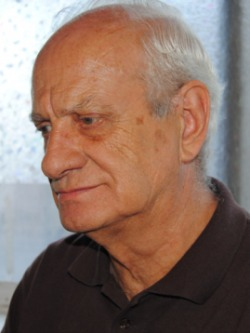

Ambassador of Chile to Venezuela
- In office 19 April 2014 – 20 March 2018
- President: Michelle Bachelet
- Preceded by: Claudio Herrera Álamos
- Succeeded by: Roberto Araos Sánchez

Minister of Housing and Urbanism
- In office 28 August 1973 – 11 September 1973
- President: Salvador Allende
- Preceded by: Aníbal Palma
- Succeeded by: Arturo Vivero Ávila

Minister of Mining
- In office 5 July 1973 – 28 August 1973
- President: Salvador Allende
- Preceded by: Sergio Bitar
- Succeeded by: Rolando González Acevedo

Member of the Chamber of Deputies of Chile
- In office 15 May 1969 – 5 July 1973

Personal details
- Born: 19 October 1941 (age 84) Talca, Chile
- Party: Christian Democratic Party (1969−1971); Christian Left (1971−?); Party for Democracy (1987−2012); Citizen Left (2012−2018)
- Spouse: Olaya Tomic Errázuriz
- Children: Three
- Relatives: Radomiro Tomic (father-in-law)
- Education: University of Chile (BA)
- Occupation: Politician; Diplomatic
- Profession: Engineer

Pedro Felipe Ramírez Ceballos (born 19 October 1941) is a Chilean politician who has served as deputy, minister of Salvador Allende and ambassador of his country in Venezuela.

== Biography ==
=== Personal life ===
He is openly gay, assuming his homosexuality while in exile in Venezuela. In 1984, after returning to Chile, the National Information Center (CNI) threatened to publish evidence that would reveal his homosexuality, strongly rejected by society at the time. Although Ramírez and the rest of the Christian Left Party were not certain that the intelligence agencies of the dictatorship had this evidence, they preferred to avoid publicizing the situation. Thus, Ramírez left the general secretariat, being replaced by Luis Maira, and left the most relevant political positions.
