= Olga Feliú =

Chilean lawyer and politician (1923–2022)

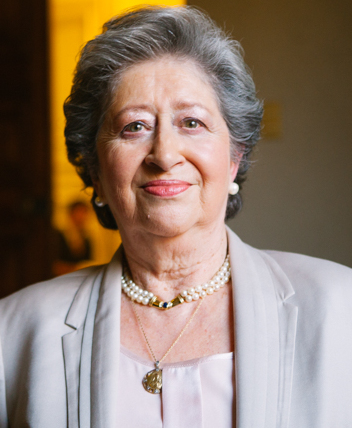

Member of the Senate
- In office 11 March 1990 – 11 March 1998
- Preceded by: Office re-established
- Succeeded by: Enrique Silva Cimma

Personal details
- Born: 20 May 1932 Santiago, Chile
- Died: 27 June 2017 (aged 85) Santiago, Chile
- Spouse: Waldo Ortúzar
- Children: 4
- Parent(s): Miguel Ángel Feliú; Olga Segovia
- Education: University of Chile (LL.B)
- Profession: Lawyer

Olga Feliú Segovia (20 August 1932 – 25 June 2017) was a Chilean politician and lawyer. She was appointed to the Senate in 1990 by the Supreme Court and served until 1998, when she was succeeded by Enrique Silva Cimma.

== Biography ==
=== Family and youth ===
She was born in Santiago on 20 August 1932. She was the daughter of Miguel Ángel Feliú and María Segovia. She married Waldo Ortúzar Latapiat and had four children. She died in Santiago on 25 June 2017.

=== Professional career ===
She completed her primary and secondary education at Colegio Santa Elena in Santiago. She later entered the Faculty of Law of the University of Chile, qualifying as a lawyer on 14 January 1963. Her graduation thesis for the degree in Legal and Social Sciences was entitled “The Effects of Marriage and Its Annulment in Administrative Law”.

In 1954, while still a law student, she joined the Office of the Comptroller General of the Republic as an administrative officer. In 1963, she was appointed as a lawyer within the same institution, and in 1967 she became deputy head of the Subdepartment of Coordination and Legal Information. She worked for 26 years at the Comptroller's Office, retiring in 1980.

In parallel, in 1968 she served as a teaching assistant in Criminal Law at the University of Chile. That same year, she attended the Chilean–Uruguayan meeting on “Legal Information” held in Montevideo. In 1971, representing the Comptroller's Office, she participated in the Eighth Franco–Latin American Conferences on Comparative Law in Argentina. She was also invited by the United Nations to become familiar with legal and administrative activities in Puerto Rico, Brazil, and Spain. In 1974, she assumed as Head of the Department of Prior Review and Registry ―Toma de Razón y Registro― of the Comptroller's Office, a position she held for six years.

Between 1980 and 1990, she practiced law independently. She was a founding partner of the law firm Ortúzar, Feliú & Sagües and handled, among other cases, the Colonia Dignidad case.

== Political career ==
In her capacity as former Head of Department of the Comptroller General's Office, she was appointed Senator by the Plenary Court of the Supreme Court of Chile, serving from 11 March 1990 until 1998.

After completing her parliamentary term, she returned to private legal practice, founding the consulting firm *Feliú & Asociados* together with Liliana Fernández Colom and Agustín Errázuriz Barros.

On 23 August 2010, she was appointed a member of the National Commission for Workplace Safety by President Sebastián Piñera. In 2011, she was elected president of the Chilean Bar Association, of which she had been a councillor since 1999, becoming the first woman to hold that office. In 2013, she was re-elected for a second term, remaining in office until 2015.

On 10 March 2015, President Michelle Bachelet appointed her as a member of the Presidential Advisory Council against Corruption and Conflicts of Interest. From April 2016 until May 2017, she served as president of the Arbitration and Mediation Center of the Santiago Chamber of Commerce.

=== Honours ===
In 1993, she was recognized by the National Association of Advertisers (ANDA) and was repeatedly distinguished as one of the 100 leading women in Chile.

=== Other activities ===
Among other activities, she was a member of the Advisory Council of the National Association of Advertisers (ANDA); a member of the Board of Directors of Bernardo O’Higgins University (UBO); a director of the Hospital Clínico Universidad de Chile Foundation; and a member of the Editorial Advisory Committee of El Diario Financiero, where she also worked as a columnist.
