= Edmundo Vargas =

Chilean politician

Ambassador of Chile to Costa Rica
- In office 1997–2000
- President: Eduardo Frei Ruíz-Tagle
- Preceded by: Aníbal Palma
- Succeeded by: Guillermo Yunge

Ambassador of Chile to Argentina
- In office 21 June 1993 – 31 May 1994
- President: Patricio Aylwin
- Preceded by: Carlos Figueroa Serrano
- Succeeded by: Eduardo Rodríguez Guarachi

Undersecretary of Foreign Affairs
- In office 11 March 1990 – 21 July 1993
- President: Patricio Aylwin
- Preceded by: Sergio Covarrubias
- Succeeded by: Rodrigo Díaz Albónico

Personal details
- Born: 22 April 1937 (age 89) Vina del Mar, Chile
- Party: Christian Democratic Party
- Education: Pontifical Catholic University of Valparaíso (BA)
- Occupation: Diplomatic; Teacher
- Profession: Lawyer

Daniel Edmundo Vargas Carreño (born 22 April 1937) is a Chilean politician who has served as ambassador and has worked for the Ministry of Foreign Affairs.

He is honoris causa doctor of the University of Buenos Aires.
