= Hermes Ahumada =

Chilean politician

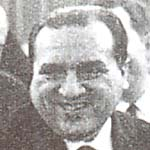

President of the Senate of Chile
- In office 15 May 1965 – 1 June 1965
- Preceded by: Hugo Zepeda Barrios
- Succeeded by: Tomás Reyes Vicuña

Member of the Senate of Chile
- In office 15 May 1961 – 15 May 1969
- Constituency: 2nd Provincial Agrupation

Member of the Chamber of Deputies of Chile
- In office 15 May 1945 – 15 May 1961
- Constituency: 23rd Departamental Agrupation

Personal details
- Born: 4 March 1911 Rengo, Chile
- Died: 28 December 2004 (aged 93) Santiago, Chile
- Party: Radical Party
- Spouse: Inés Muñoz Tapia
- Children: Six
- Relatives: Gerardo Ahumada (brother)
- Education: University of Chile (LL.B); Columbia University (LL.M)
- Occupation: Politician
- Profession: Lawyer and Physician

Miguel Hermes Ahumada Pacheco (born 4 March 1911 – 28 December 2004) was a Chilean politician, lawyer and physician who served as President of the Senate of Chile. He was a member of the Radical Party of Chile.
