= 1988 Chilean presidential referendum =

1988 referendum in Chile on extending the rule of Augusto Pinochet

- 5 October 1988
- Plebiscite: President of the Republic; Augusto Pinochet Ugarte

Results
Choice	Votes	%
Yes	3,119,110	44.01%
No	3,967,579	55.99%
Valid votes	7,086,689	97.72%
Invalid or blank votes	165,254	2.28%
Total votes	7,251,943	100.00%
Registered voters/turnout	7,429,404	97.61%
- Results by commune

A referendum on whether Augusto Pinochet, the head of a military dictatorship, should become president for eight years under resumed civilian rule was held in Chile on 5 October 1988. The "No" side won with 56% of the vote, marking the end of Pinochet's 16 1/2-year rule. Democratic elections were held in 1989, leading to the establishment of a new government in 1990.

== Background ==
Army General Augusto Pinochet and leaders of the Air Force, Navy, and police force took power on 11 September 1973, in a coup d'état that deposed the democratically elected Socialist President Salvador Allende. Allende committed suicide as the presidential palace was being bombarded. A military junta – led by Pinochet, Air Force General Gustavo Leigh, Navy Admiral José Toribio Merino, and Carabinero Chief General César Mendoza – was sworn in the same evening.

The following day, the four drafted an official document suspending the 1925 constitution and Congress, establishing the Junta as the country's supreme authority. Pinochet was designated as its first president, and the four verbally agreed to rotate the office. Shortly after, the Junta formed an advisory committee, which Pinochet successfully staffed with Army officers loyal to himself. One of their initial recommendations was to discard the idea of a rotating presidency, arguing it would create too many administrative problems and lead to confusion.

In March 1974, six months after the Junta's establishment, Pinochet verbally attacked the Christian Democratic Party, stating that there was no set timetable for a return to civilian rule. On 18 December 1974, Pinochet was declared the Supreme Leader of the nation. After that date, the junta functioned strictly as a legislative body until the return to democracy in 1990.

On 24 September 1973, the junta set up a commission to draft a blueprint for a new constitution. By 5 October 1978, the commission had completed its work. Over the next two years, the proposal was studied by the Chilean Council of State, presided over by former president Jorge Alessandri. In July 1980, the Council submitted a Constitution draft to Pinochet and the Junta. A constitutional referendum, considered "highly irregular" and "fraudulent" by some observers, occurred on 11 September 1980, in which 67% of voters approved the new constitution.

The Constitution took effect on 11 March 1981, establishing a "transition period." During this time, Pinochet would wield executive power and the Junta would hold legislative power for the next eight years. Before this period ended, a presidential candidate was to be proposed by the Commanders-in-Chief of the Armed Forces and the Carabinero Chief General for the following eight-year term. The candidate would be ratified by registered voters in a national plebiscite. On August 30, 1988, Pinochet was declared the candidate.

In the last years of the dictatorship, the commanders-in-chief of the Navy, Air Force, and Carabineros distanced themselves from Pinochet, expressing their wish for a civilian to represent the regime in the 1988 plebiscite. However, Pinochet imposed himself as the candidate.

== Plebiscite ==
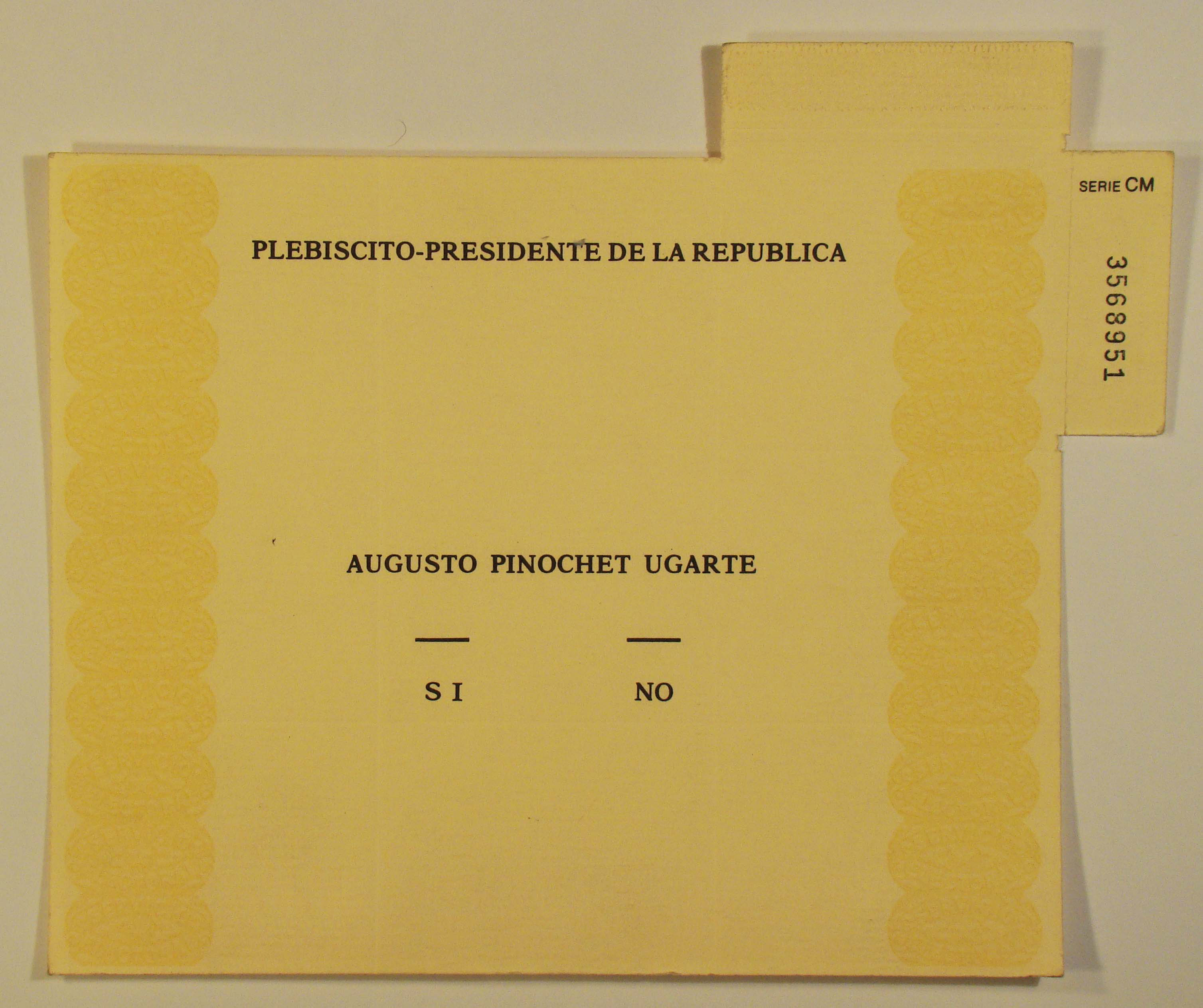
Original ballot

The plebiscite – as detailed in the 1980 Constitution – consisted of two choices:

- Yes: the proposed candidate is approved. Pinochet takes office on 11 March 1989 for an eight-year mandate, and parliamentary elections are held nine months after he is sworn in. The Junta continues to exercise legislative power until the newly elected Congress takes office on 11 March 1990.
- No: the proposed candidate is rejected. Pinochet and the Junta continue in power for another year and a half. Presidential and parliamentary elections are held three months before Pinochet's term expires. The newly elected president and Congress take office on 11 March 1990.

== Political endorsements ==
=== Yes ===
- Democratic Party of Chile (Partido Democrático de Chile)
- Great Civic Front of Chile (Gran Frente Cívico de Chile)
- Independent Democratic Union (Unión Demócrata Independiente)
- Liberal Democrat Party of Chile (Partido Liberal Demócrata de Chile)
- National Advance (Avanzada Nacional)
- National Party (Partido Nacional)
- National Renewal (Renovación Nacional)
- Radical Democracy (Democracia Radical)
- Social Democrat Party (Partido Socialdemócrata)
- Party of the South (Partido del Sur)

=== No ===
- Christian Democratic Party (Partido Demócrata Cristiano)
- Christian Left (Izquierda Cristiana)
- Communist Party of Chile (Partido Comunista de Chile)
- Humanist Party (Partido Humanista)
- Liberal Party (Partido Liberal)
- MAPU Obrero Campesino
- National Democratic Party (Partido Democrático Nacional)
- National Party for the NO (Partido Nacional por el NO)
- Party for Democracy (Partido por la Democracia)
- Popular Socialist Union (Unión Socialista Popular)
- Popular Unitary Action Movement (Movimiento de Acción Popular Unitaria)
- Radical Party (Partido Radical)
- Revolutionary Left Movement (Movimiento de Izquierda Revolucionaria)
- Social Democracy Party of Chile (Partido Social Democracia de Chile)
- Democratic Socialist Radical Party (Partido Radical Socialista Democrático)
- Socialist Party of Chile (Almeyda faction) (Partido Socialista-Almeyda)
- Socialist Party of Chile (Historic faction) (Partido Socialista-Histórico)
- Socialist Party of Chile (Mandujano faction) (Partido Socialista-Mandujano)
- Socialist Party of Chile (Núñez faction) (Partido Socialista-Núñez)
- The Greens (Los Verdes)

=== Null vote ===
- Chilean Socialist Party (Partido Socialista Chileno) A populist party created by pro-Junta factions to draw support away from the "No" vote.

== The campaign ==
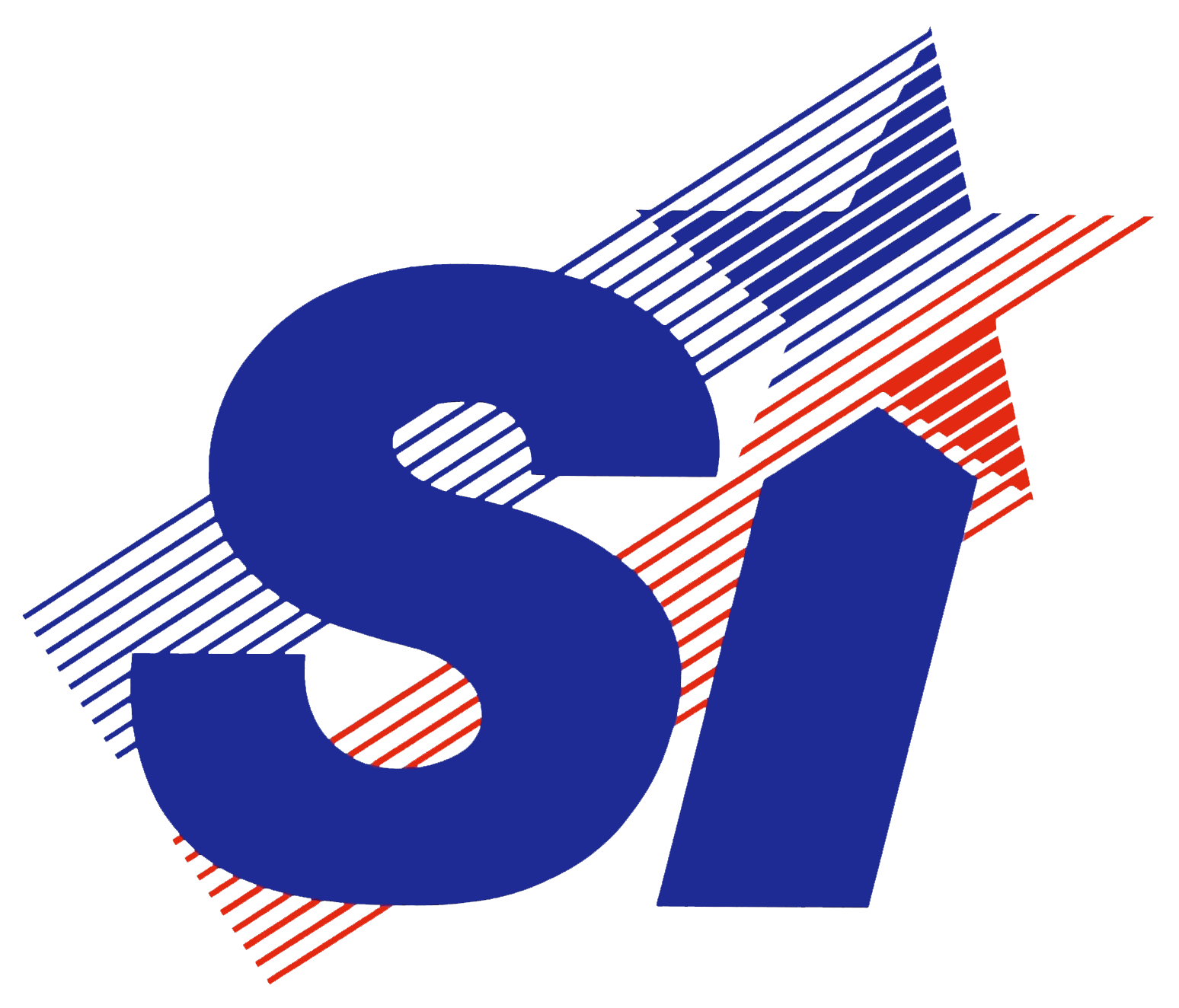
Symbol of the "Yes" option.

The campaign is regarded, along with the registration process, as one of the key factors that led to the victory of the No side in the plebiscite.

For the first time in the history of Chile, both options were guaranteed free electoral advertising spaces—franjas—of 15 minutes each, late at night or early in the morning. (There were similar spaces in prime time, but only for the government). They were first broadcast on 5 September, at 11 pm, just one month before the referendum. In a short time the spots prepared by the No side were seen to be better, despite the Yes side creating a more elaborate campaign devised by an Argentinian advertising agency and with the assistance of the Chilean Armed Forces. The Minister of the Interior Sergio Fernández, one of the main coordinators of the official campaign, said:

The (campaign) results were poor. In a few days nobody could ignore the evident technical superiority of the No campaign: superior in argumentation, superior in filming, superior in music. Its signature tune, with the slogan "La alegría ya viene" (Joy is coming) as its main element, was so catchy that even the Yes campaign creatives hummed it during their brainstorming sessions.

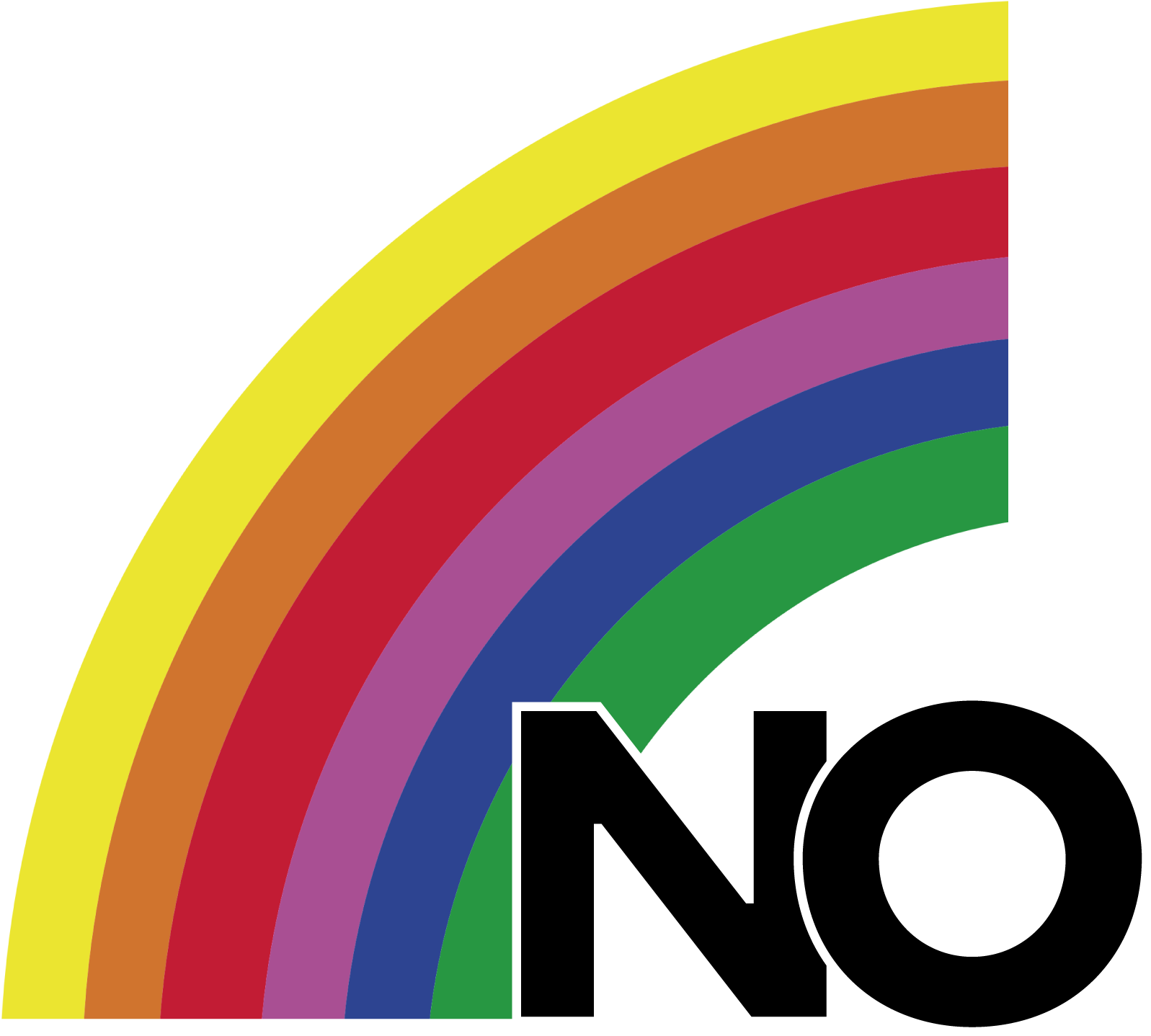
Main logo of the No campaign, el arcoíris (the rainbow)

The No side used a rainbow as its main symbol, with the intention of symbolising the plural views of the opposition (each member party had its own colour depicted in the rainbow) and, at the same time, the hope of a better Chile and a more prosperous future. Their campaign, directed by American and Chilean advertising men, combined both criticism (including testimony by victims of torture and relatives of disappeared people during the dictatorship) and optimism, highlighting that the No option did not mean returning to the socialist system of former president Salvador Allende, but the re-establishment of democracy. This idea was supported by the appearance of right-wing leaders standing for No. A popular jingle was composed, with the main slogan of the campaign, "Chile, la alegría ya viene" (Chile, joy is on its way), and both Chilean and international celebrities, such as Patricio Bañados (renowned journalist banned from TV by the Junta), Sting, Jane Fonda, Richard Dreyfuss, Sara Montiel, Robert Blake, Paloma San Basilio and Christopher Reeve starred in the No spots. One advert featured a middle-aged woman describing her experience of being kidnapped and tortured after the 1973 coup, and advocating a no vote, followed by her son Carlos Caszely, one of Chile's top footballers of the 1970s and 1980s, and a critic of the Pinochet regime.

The Yes campaign had two main goals: creating fear amongst voters by reminding them of the chaotic situation of Chile in 1973, with the consequent coup d'état (a background blamed on supporters of the No side), and improving the general perception of Augusto Pinochet, regarded by the public as an arrogant and authoritarian leader. The spots included jingles with lyrics supportive of the Junta and songs that were close to promoting a cult of personality around Pinochet, such as the main campaign anthem, "Un horizonte de esperanza" (A Horizon of Hope) or a Rapa Nui folk song, "Iorana, Presidente" (Hello, President), the latter of which was composed by then 8-year-old Laura Alarcón Rapu. Within both campaigns, the presence of multiple characters of the time shone. Within the Yes campaign, apart from the right-wing political faces, the singers Marcelo Hernández (the "uncle Marcelo" of Cachureos), Willy Bascuñán, Arturo Giolito, Ginette Acevedo, Patricia Maldonado and Benjamín Mackenna; television presenters Jorge Rencoret and Katherine Salosny, and athletes Patricio Cornejo, Hans Gildemeister and Elías Figueroa were part of the television strip. Heading the space of the No was the journalist and presenter Patricio Bañados, until then separated from television; for his part, the strip of the Sí was headed since the chapter of September 18 by Hernán Serrano, who was joined in some segments by the journalist Carmen Gardeweg and the former mayor of Santiago Carlos Bombal. In its early stages the campaign put its focus on the economic success achieved by the government, but when this failed to appeal to viewers, the strategy followed was to introduce criticism of the No adverts and the publication of polls that showed massive support for Pinochet, and a new look of the programmes starting in the 18 September broadcast, with the new format almost identical to those of the No – a presenter, Hernán Serrano, introduced each topic, and more testimonies were added.

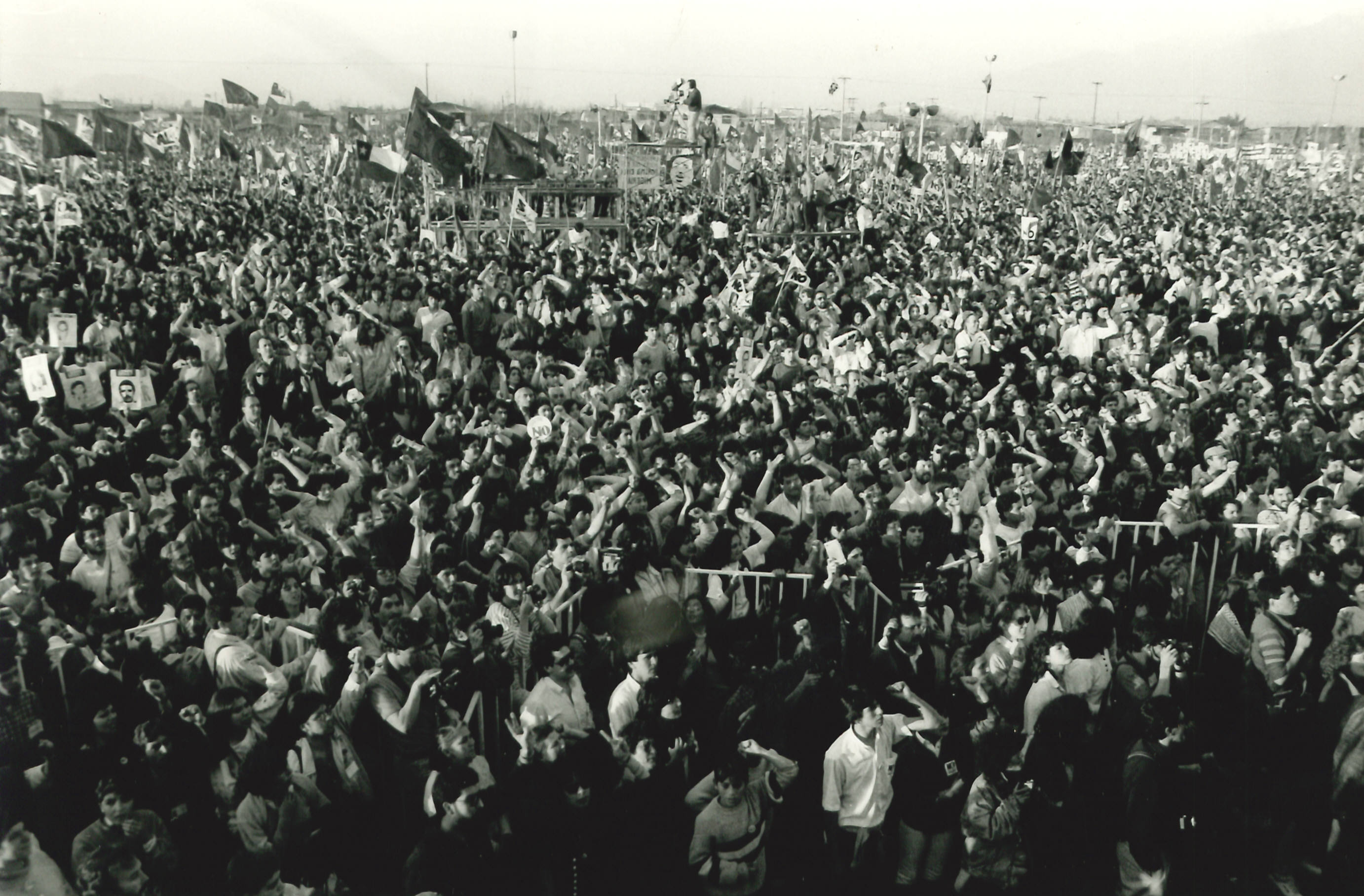
Rally in support of the "No" campaign

Both sides called for massive rallies: on 22 September the No side started the March of Joy (Marcha de la alegría), which lasted 10 days and joined supporters from the northernmost and southernmost cities of Chile in Santiago. These rallies were often stopped by the Carabineros or the secret police on claimed suspicion of possible attacks, or for no stated reason, and the demonstrators were attacked by armed pro-Yes supporters without the police taking any action. On 2 October the Yes campaign called for a huge rally in downtown Santiago. The rallies had different coverage by the news media, which struggled to show more Chileans standing for the Yes side than for the No, and were considered to be too close to the Yes campaign.

== Foreign interference ==
Hungarian-American investor and philanthropist George Soros provided advice to the "No" campaign, according to Máximo Pacheco Matte. The support was reflected "in carrying out studies and obtaining data that gave us information that had been hidden from us for 17 years (...) What we learned there was crucial for the preparation of the famous television program for the 'No' campaign and for the victory in the plebiscite."

Likewise, the organization created by the United States Congress, National Endowment for Democracy and linked to the CIA together with the National Democratic Institute for International Affairs contributed one million dollars to the "No" campaign and sent observers to the plebiscite and established a parallel counting system in conjunction with German think tanks and the "Committee for Free Elections". Furthermore, David Altman notes that Pinochet allowed "a certain degree of freedom to carry out a mobilization campaign against the regime."

== Electorate ==
Voting eligibility extended to individuals aged 18 or older on election day, who were either Chilean citizens or foreigners with legal residency in Chile for a minimum of five years. Only those listed on the electoral roll were permitted to vote, although registration was not obligatory. Registered Chilean citizens were required to participate in the voting process.

== Results ==
Results by regions, provinces and communes
Voted Yes
Voted No

Choice	Votes	%
For	3,119,110	44.01
Against	3,967,579	55.99
Total	7,086,689	100.00
Valid votes	7,086,689	97.72
Invalid votes	94,594	1.30
Blank votes	70,660	0.97
Total votes	7,251,943	100.00
Registered voters/turnout	7,429,404	97.61
Source: Tribunal Calificador de Elecciones

=== Result by regions ===
Region		«Yes»	%	«No»	%
I	Tarapacá	75,849	44.71	93,800	55.29
II	Antofagasta	84,259	39.32	130,052	60.68
III	Atacama	49,400	43.84	63,293	56.16
IV	Coquimbo	114,250	46.02	133,997	53.98
V	Valparaíso	324,058	42.69	434,997	57.31
VI	O'Higgins	164,430	44.08	208,574	55.92
VII	Maule	220,742	48.83	231,348	51.17
VIII	Biobío	409,513	44.71	506,513	55.29
IX	Araucanía	220,090	54.05	187,071	45.95
X	Los Lagos	242,457	50.15	240,984	49.85
XI	Aysén	19,238	49.99	19,245	50.01
XII	Magallanes	35,549	42.36	48,372	57.64
RM	Santiago Metropolitan	1,159,275	40.98	1,669,333	59.02
Total: 7,086,689		3,119,110	44.01	3,967,579	55.99

== Aftermath ==
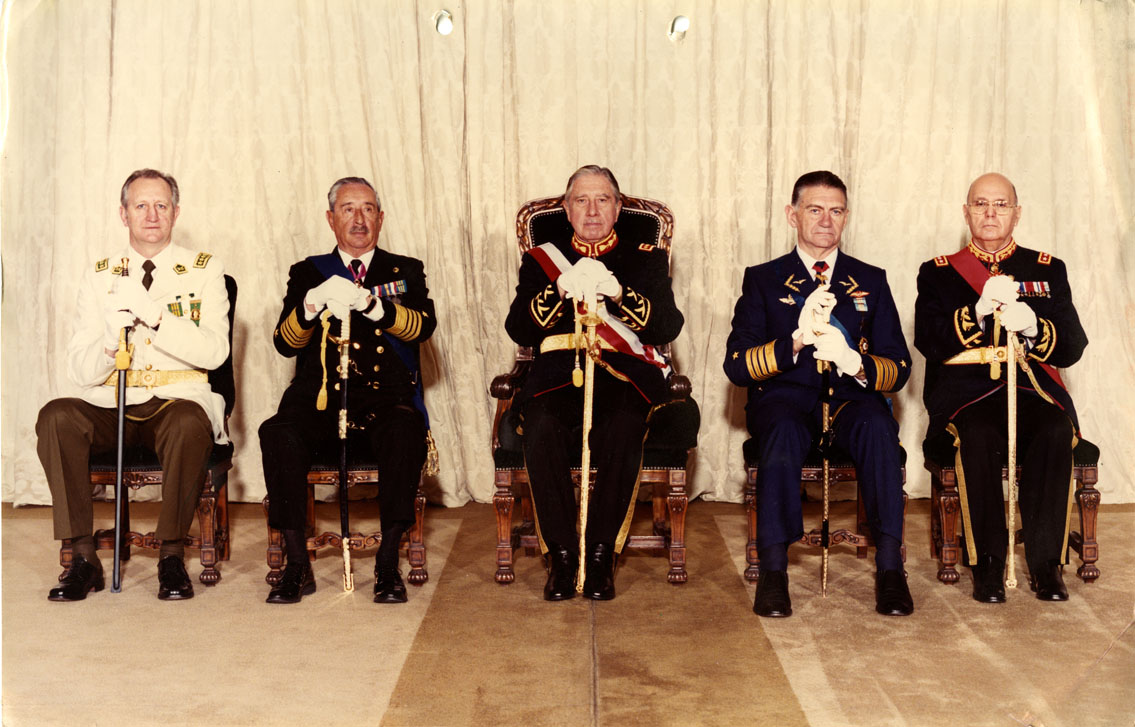
Members of the Government Junta in 1985 from left to right: Rodolfo Stange, José Toribio Merino, Augusto Pinochet, Fernando Matthei, and César Benavides

After his electoral defeat in the 1988 plebiscite, Pinochet reportedly considered plans for an auto-coup to remain in power. As early returns indicated a victory for the "No" campaign, official reporting of results was suspended, and television coverage ceased on election night. According to later accounts, Pinochet sought to create a pretext for retaining control by provoking unrest in the streets, but the Carabineros, under General Director Rodolfo Stange, refused an order to lift the police cordon in Santiago that was preventing large street gatherings and potential disturbances. Meanwhile, Air Force commander Fernando Matthei publicly acknowledged to reporters, as he entered La Moneda to meet Pinochet, that the "No" side had won the vote.

During the junta meeting that followed, Pinochet proposed granting himself extraordinary powers to have the armed forces secure the capital and restore control. Matthei refused outright, reportedly tearing up a draft decree that would have authorized emergency powers. The other junta members—Admiral José Toribio Merino of the Navy and General Stange of the Carabineros—took the same stance, insisting that the result be respected. Without their backing, Pinochet was forced to accept the outcome of the plebiscite and begin the constitutional transition to civilian rule.

The remaining junta members, who had favored the idea of a civilian candidate rather than Pinochet continuing in power, regarded the plebiscite as his personal defeat. In 1989, Pinochet and the opposition negotiated a series of constitutional reforms intended to ease the transition. The 54 amendments were approved by 91 percent of voters in a national referendum held on 30 July 1989. Presidential and parliamentary elections took place as scheduled on 14 December 1989, with Christian Democrat Patricio Aylwin winning the presidency with 55 percent of the vote. Aylwin and the newly elected Congress took office on 11 March 1990, marking the formal end of military rule in Chile.

== Popular culture ==
The 2012 film No presented a fictionalized account of the "No" television campaign. It was the first Chilean film nominated for an Academy Award for Best Foreign Language Film at the 85th Academy Awards.

== See also ==
- Chilean transition to democracy
