= Alejandro Ríos Valdivia =

Chilean pedagogue, professor and politician

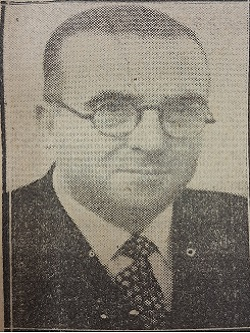

Ministry of the Interior and Public Security
- In office January 28, 1972 – February 10, 1972
- President: Salvador Allende
- Preceded by: José Tohá
- Succeeded by: Hernán del Canto

Minister of National Defense of Chile
- In office November 3, 1970 – January 7, 1972
- President: Salvador Allende
- Preceded by: Mario Astorga
- Succeeded by: José Tohá

Minister of Education of Chile
- In office November 3, 1946 – August 4, 1947
- President: Gabriel González Videla
- Preceded by: Edgardo Enríquez
- Succeeded by: Enrique Molina Garmendia

Personal details
- Born: September 29, 1901 Valparaíso, Chile
- Died: July 30, 2000 (aged 98) Santiago, Chile
- Party: Radical Party of Chile; Democratic Socialist Radical Party
- Education: University of Chile
- Occupation: Pedagogue and politician

Tomás Alejandro Ríos Valdivia (September 29, 1901, Valparaíso, Chile – July 30, 2000, Santiago, Chile) was a Chilean pedagogue and politician, minister of state under presidents Gabriel González Videla and Salvador Allende, as well as deputy for Santiago between 1945 and 1953. He was a member of the Radical Party.

== Biography ==
His parents were Moisés Ríos González and Rita Valdivia Muñoz.

He studied at the Seminary of Santiago and then at the Liceo de Aplicación, also in the Chilean capital. He then entered the Pedagogical Institute of the University of Chile to study pedagogy. He graduated as a history and geography teacher in 1923.

He worked as a teacher at the Military School and the Higher Institute of Carabineros.

As such, during the government of González Videla he became Minister of Public Education. During his tenure in the portfolio, the Universidad Técnica del Estado, today the Universidad de Santiago, was formed.

In 1964, he formed the Movement for the Doctrinal Recovery of the Radical Party to support the presidential candidacy of Salvador Allende in that year's presidential elections.

With Allende in power, he served as the Minister of National Defense. He was elected as a deputy for the 7th Departmental Group of Santiago, first district, during the periods 1945–1949 and 1949–1953.
