= Anselmo Sule =

Chilean politician (1934–2002)

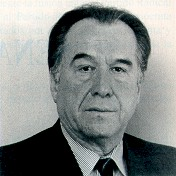

Member of the Senate
- In office 11 March 1990 – 11 March 1998
- In office 15 May 1969 – 11 September 1973

Personal details
- Born: 27 January 1934 Santiago, Chile
- Died: 7 June 2002 (aged 68) Santiago, Chile
- Party: Social Democrat Radical Party (PRSD), Radical Party (PR)
- Spouse: Fresia Fernández
- Children: Three children, including Alejandro Sule
- Education: University of Chile
- Occupation: Lawyer
- Website: Biography at the Chilean Library of Congress (in Spanish)

Vladimir Anselmo Sule Candia (January 27, 1934 – June 7, 2002) was a Chilean politician, member of the Radical Party and, afterwards, of the Social Democrat Radical Party. Sule Candia was also one of fourteen vice-presidents of the Socialist International.

== Biography ==
=== Early, and personal life ===
Anselmo Sule Candia was born in Santiago, on January 27, 1934; his parents were Anselmo Sule Redovnicovic and Rosa de Candia Gamonal. He lived his childhood in the city of Los Andes; there are reports that he was born there. Sule studied Law in the University of Chile, where he graduated in 1956 with his thesis "El sindicalismo argentino" (English: The Argentinian Syndicalism), moving temporarily to Buenos Aires to conduct his on-site research attending union meetings and political syndicalist lectures.

In 1958, he begins to work as a professor in the Syndical School of the University of Chile. Sule also married Fresia Fernández that year in Osorno; he had three children with Fernández: Tatiana, Claudio, and Alejandro Miguel. Alejandro would later become a member of the Chamber of Deputies of Chile.

According to La Cuarta, Sule held a friendship with important politicians such as Erich Honecker, Tony Blair, Ricardo Balbín and Fidel Castro, throughout his life. Sule was also a freemason, and a firefighter, member of the Bomberos de Chile.

=== Political career ===
Sule Candia joined the Radical Party of Chile in 1950, and he was president of the party between 1972 and 1973. Sule also was member of the National Congress of Chile, between 1969 and 1973, representing the VI O'Higgins Region and the Colchagua Province. He also was, during two terms, National Councillor of the College of Lawyers of Chile.

Following the 1973 Chilean coup d'etat, Sule was detained and taken to the Dawson Island together with other members of the Unidad Popular. From 1975 until 1990, he lived in different countries, such as Venezuela, Mexico, and Uruguay (where he obtained Uruguayan citizenship). During this time, he was one of 14 vice-presidents of the Socialist International.

Once Chile completed its transition to democracy, he came back to Chile, and once again was elected senator for the O'Higgins Region, holding the office between 1990 and 1998. Sule Candia also was president of the Social Democrat Radical Party.

=== Death ===
Anselmo Sule Candia died in Santiago, on June 7, 2002, at age 68, of brain cancer. Posthumously, Sule recovered his Chilean citizenship, which he had lost during the military regime.
