= Enrique Silva Cimma =

Chilean politician and lawyer

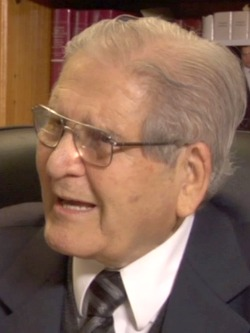

Member of the Senate
- In office 11 March 1998 – 11 March 2006
- Preceded by: Olga Feliú
- Succeeded by: End of Appointed Senators
- Constituency: Appointed Senator

Minister of Foreign Affairs
- In office 11 March 1990 – 11 March 1994
- President: Patricio Aylwin
- Preceded by: Hernán Felipe Errázuriz
- Succeeded by: Carlos Figueroa Serrano

President of the Constitutional Court
- In office 10 September 1971 – 11 September 1973
- Preceded by: Office created
- Succeeded by: Isabel Borquez

Comptroller General of the Republic of Chile
- In office 15 May 1959 – 31 January 1967
- Preceded by: Enrique Bahamonde
- Succeeded by: Sergio Fernández

Personal details
- Party: Radical Party
- Spouse: Elena Marfán
- Children: 3
- Parent(s): Armando Cimma; María Cimma
- Education: University of Chile (LL.B)
- Occupation: Politician
- Profession: Lawyer

Enrique Silva Cimma (November 11, 1918 – July 14, 2012) was a Chilean politician, academic and lawyer. Silva served as Foreign Minister of Chile from 1990 to 1994. In addition to a long political career, Silva taught at the University of Chile for much of his life. He wrote more than thirty books, many focusing on law.

Silva began his public career by serving as Comptroller General of Chile from 1959 to 1967. He was chosen as the leader of the Radical Party and became a member of the International Socialist Bureau in 1983. He also joined the Social Democrat Radical Party.

Silva was a founding member of the Party for Democracy, which was formed in 1987. He was a leading member of Patricio Aylwin's presidential campaign during the 1989 presidential election. In 1990, Chilean President Patricio Aylwin appointed Silva as Foreign Minister, a position he held until 1994.

Silva was appointed a Senator by the Supreme Court of Chile, serving an eight-year term from 1998 to 2006. Then, in 2012, Silva died of a bronchial obstruction at his home on July 14, 2012, at the age of 93. Survivors included his son-in-law, former congressman Nelson Avila.

== Early life and family ==
Silva was born on November 11, 1918, in Iquique, Chile. He was the son of Armando Silva and María Cimma. His father served as governor of Pisagua, president of the Liberal Alliance, and was a leader of the presidential campaign of Arturo Alessandri Palma in 1920.

He married Elena Marfán Cheyre, with whom he had three children. He was the father-in-law of former senator Nelson Ávila.

== Professional career ==
He pursued higher education at the University of Chile, where he qualified as a lawyer in 1945 with a thesis titled The Office of the Comptroller General of the Republic. During his first year of law studies, he worked for the Municipality of Santiago as an inspector at La Vega and the municipal slaughterhouse, and as a ticket clerk in the gallery of the Balmaceda Theatre, owned by José Venturino.

In 1939, he joined the Office of the Comptroller General of the Republic as a typist and pursued a full civil service career. He stood out as an advisor to the Minister of Finance of President Gabriel González Videla, Jorge Alessandri. He later served as Director of the Legal Department, Deputy Comptroller, and Comptroller General of the Republic between 1958 and 1964.

Concurrently, he pursued an academic career at the University of Chile as a full professor of Administrative Law, a position he obtained through competitive examination in 1949, and later as senior full professor in the chair of Public Law from 1968. He served as acting dean of the Faculty of Law and Social Sciences in 1968 and was twice elected by the academic community to the University Council.

He was Director of the Seminar on Public Law from 1953 and became the first director of the School of Political and Administrative Sciences of the University of Chile. Until March 1998, he was responsible for academic training and activities. In 1968, he became a full member of the Academy of Social, Political and Moral Sciences of the Institute of Chile and a member of the International Commission of Jurists.

After leaving the Comptroller General's Office, he served for seven years as president of the Chilean–Soviet Institute of Culture, traveling to the Soviet Union and Bulgaria in 1972. In 1980, he was re-evaluated as a full professor of Administrative Law at the University of Chile and, from 1998, served as professor ad honorem.

== Public career ==
During the government of President Eduardo Frei Montalva, Silva Cimma chaired the National Commission for Rationalization, working with subsecretaries Adolfo Zaldívar, Juan Hamilton, and Patricio Rojas. Under his administration, measures such as the implementation of the single school day, the introduction of exempt presidential decrees to reduce administrative burden, and efforts to prevent political distribution of public offices were adopted.

In 1961, he was a candidate for the Seventh Provincial Grouping of Ñuble, Concepción, and Arauco, replacing Humberto Enríquez Frodden. He served as a substitute justice of the Supreme Court of Chile between 1968 and 1973. Concurrently, during the government of President Salvador Allende, he was appointed President of the first Constitutional Court of Chile between 1971 and 1973.

Following the military coup of 11 September 1973, he traveled to Spain for four months to teach a law course and later emigrated to Venezuela, where he served as a professor at the Central University of Venezuela and as an advisor to the Comptroller General of the Republic of Venezuela.

During the period of political clandestinity, he served as president of the Radical Party of Chile from 1983 to 1990 and as a member of its National Executive Committee. In 1990, more than 300 assemblies were created and the Center for Research and Studies of Democratic Socialism (CIEDE) was founded, financed by the German Social Democratic Party. He served as a member and vice-president of the Bureau of the Socialist International.

From 1984, he served as president of the Democratic Socialist Federation of Chile. In March 1983, together with Gabriel Valdés Subercaseaux, he co-founded the Democratic Alliance, serving as its president for several periods until 1987. He was also a member of the leadership of the "No" campaign in the 1988 plebiscite.

In 1989, together with Ricardo Núñez, president of the Socialist Party of Chile, he co-founded the Party for Democracy (PPD). He was a pre-candidate for the presidency in 1989 and later became president of the presidential campaign committee of Patricio Aylwin.

On 11 March 1990, he was appointed Minister of Foreign Affairs by President Patricio Aylwin, serving until 11 March 1994. During his tenure, he worked to re-establish diplomatic relations with Mexico and countries of Central and Eastern Europe and the former Soviet Union, and promoted regional integration through Chile's incorporation into the Rio Group, assuming its presidency and pursuing agreements with Bolivia, Argentina, Ecuador, Peru, and other countries on economic, agricultural, and diplomatic matters.
