= Chilean Socialist Party (1987–1990) =

Political party in Chile

The Chilean Socialist Party (Spanish: el Partido Socialista Chileno (PSCH)) was a political party in Chile, that self-identified as left-wing and which existed legally from 20 June 1988 to 9 May 1990. It has been claimed that it was formed as a tool for gathering support for the Pinochet dictatorship during its last years; the party used the traditional logo of the Socialist Party of Chile, a party then illegal. The leader of the party – Juan Carlos Moraga – has denied he formed the party to defend the dictatorship.

The party has been characterized as a "political Frankenstein".

The party used the logo of the Socialist Party of Chile, which was banned at the time.
