= Republican Party (Chile, 1982) =

Republican Party Partido Republicano
- Founded: 1982
- Dissolved: 1987
- Merged into: Liberal-Republican Union
- Headquarters: Santiago, Chile
- Ideology: Liberalism
- Political position: Centre to centre-right

The Republican Party or Republican Right (Spanish: Partido Republicano/Derecha Republicana) —also known as Republican Democratic Right (Spanish: Derecha Democrática Republicana)— was a Chilean centre-right political party existing from 1982 to 1987 during the military dictatorship of Augusto Pinochet.

Its origins date back to late October 1982, when a group of politicians from the National Party founded the Center for Analysis of National and International Reality. His goal was to provide a basis for the formation of a right-wing democratic party, inspired by modern liberalism and respectful of human rights. This would give rise to a party whose name would be Republican Right, led by the ex-conservative Julio Subercaseaux and ex-liberals Hugo Zepeda Barrios and Armando Jaramillo Lyon.

The party was among the founding members of the Democratic Alliance on August 6, 1983, having previously signed the Democratic Manifesto of March 14 of that year. In October 1984, it changed its name to the Republican Party after entry of the Liberal Party to the coalition. Both merged in 1987 to form the Liberal-Republican Union.
