= Germán Molina Valdivieso =

Chilean judge (born 1943)

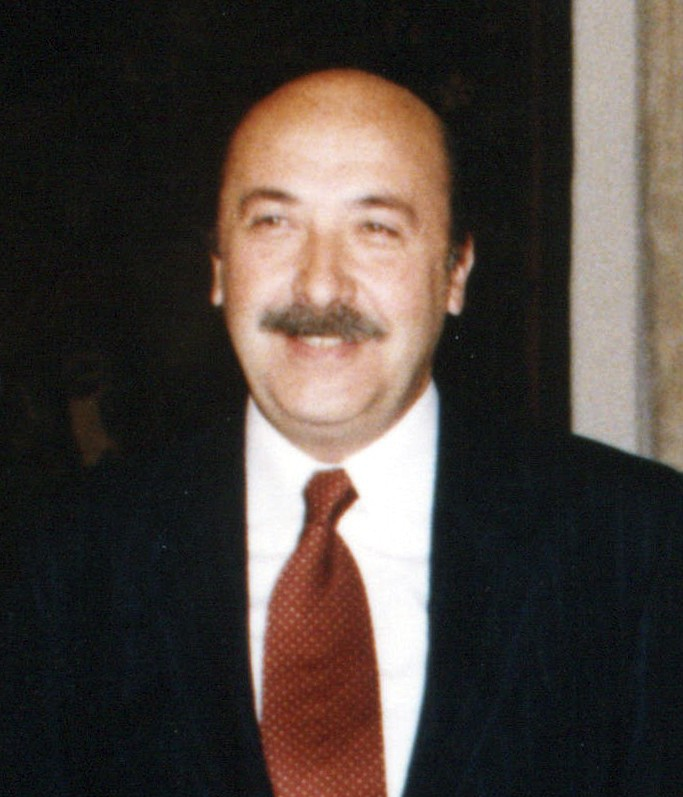

Minister of Labor and Social Provision
- In office 1 August 1998 – 11 March 2000
- President: Eduardo Frei Ruiz-Tagle
- Preceded by: Jorge Arrate
- Succeeded by: Ricardo Solari

Minister of Transport and Telecommunications
- In office 28 September 1992 – 11 March 1994
- President: Patricio Aylwin
- Preceded by: Germán Correa
- Succeeded by: Narciso Irureta

Personal details
- Born: 1 October 1943 (age 83) Vina del Mar, Chile
- Party: Christian Left; Party for Democracy (1987−present)
- Relatives: Jorge Molina Valdivieso (brother)
- Education: Pontifical Catholic University of Valparaíso (LL.B)
- Occupation: Politician
- Profession: Lawyer

Germán Molina Valdivieso (born 1 January 1943) is a Chilean former minister.

== Biography ==
The son of Jorge Molina López and María Adriana Valdivieso Peña, he studied at the Sacred Hearts School of his hometown and later qualified as a lawyer at the Pontifical Catholic University of Valparaíso.

During the period of the regime led by General Augusto Pinochet, he was a founder and vice president of the Chilean Human Rights Commission. He also served as president of the World University Center and as director of the International Organization for Adult Education.

He married María Ximena Montero Jiménez, with whom he had three sons.

== Political career ==
He was a member of the Christian Left. In 1987, he was one of the founders of the Party for Democracy (PPD) and held several party positions. In the 1989 parliamentary elections, he was a candidate for the Chamber of Deputies for the Curicó Province, but was not elected.

Between September 1992 and March 1994, he served as Minister of Transport and Telecommunications in the government of Patricio Aylwin.

During the government of Eduardo Frei Ruiz-Tagle, he held the positions of Ambassador of Chile to the Netherlands between 1994 and 1997, and Minister of Labor and Social Security between 1998 and 2000. As head of the Labour Ministry, he was tasked with promoting a labour reform that was rejected by business sectors and regarded by opposition figures as a manoeuvre intended to benefit the ruling coalition’s presidential candidate during the electoral period.

He also served as General Coordinator of Concessions at the Ministry of Public Works (MOP) during the early part of the government of President Ricardo Lagos, and as a director of the state-owned companies State Railways Company of Chile (EFE) and Correos de Chile.

His departure from the MOP in October 2002 was triggered by differences with Minister Javier Etcheberry, an engineer who joined the ministry from the Internal Revenue Service (SII) at the beginning of that year with the mission of drastically changing the management style of the various units, which had allowed room for acts of corruption during the administration of his predecessor, Carlos Cruz Lorenzen.
