= Paola Tapia =

Chilean civil engineer and politician

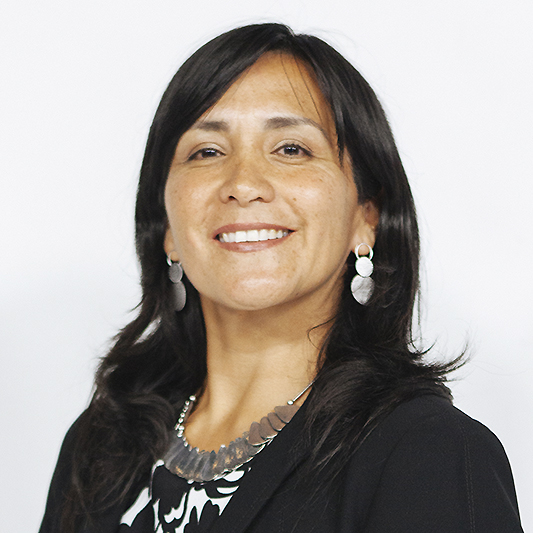
- Official portrait (2017)

Minister of Transport and Telecommunications
- In office 14 March 2017 – 11 March 2018
- President: Michelle Bachelet
- Preceded by: Andrés Gómez-Lobo
- Succeeded by: Gloria Hutt

Personal details
- Born: 9 August 1975 (age 51) Vina del Mar, Chile
- Party: None
- Education: Pontifical Catholic University of Chile (LL.B)
- Occupation: Politician
- Profession: Lawyer

Paola Alejandra Tapia Salas (born 9 August 1975) is a Chilean politician and lawyer who served as Minister of Transport and Telecommunications.

== Biography ==
Tapia was born and raised in the Valparaíso Region.

She studied law at the Faculty of Law of the Pontifical Catholic University of Chile (PUC), qualifying as a lawyer. She later earned a master's degree in law from the Pontifical Catholic University of Valparaíso (PUCV), as well as postgraduate diplomas in public management and public policy from the University of Chile.

=== Professional career ===
Tapia taught at the Faculty of Legal and Social Sciences of the University of Talca. Between 2019 and 2022, she served as director of the law programme at the Central University of Chile.

== Political career ==
Tapia joined the Ministry of Transport and Telecommunications in 2004, working in its Enforcement Department. In April 2006, she was appointed director of the Legal Division of the Undersecretariat of Transport while Sergio Espejo was minister, and also served as second acting replacement for the undersecretary. She later became an adviser to Minister René Cortázar between 2007 and 2010. During the President Sebastián Piñera's first administration, she worked as a lawyer for the Civil Aviation Board of Chile (JAC).

Following the election of Michelle Bachelet in 2013, Tapia returned to the ministry as an adviser to Minister Andrés Gómez-Lobo on legislative affairs. During this period, she also served as vice president of Tren Central until 2014 and as a member of the board of the Public Enterprises System under the Ministry of Economy, Development and Tourism.

On 14 March 2017, Tapia was appointed Minister of Transport and Telecommunications following the resignation of Gómez-Lobo. She became the first woman to hold the post since the ministry's creation in 1974.

Tapia ran as an independent candidate in the 2021 Chilean Constitutional Convention election, representing District 7 as part of the Lista del Apruebo coalition with the support of the Party for Democracy (PPD), but was not elected.

Under the administration of President Gabriel Boric, she was appointed director of the Metropolitan Public Transport Directorate on 16 March 2022, an advisory body to the Ministry of Transport and Telecommunications.
