= Carlos Hurtado =

Carlos Hurtado may refer to:

- Carlos Hurtado Ruiz-Tagle (born 1937), Chilean politician
- Carlos Hurtado (wrestler) (born 1951), Peruvian wrestler
- Carlos Hurtado (actor) (born 1967), Colombian actor, appeared in Diomedes, el cacique de la junta et al.
- Carlos Alberto Hurtado (born 1984), Mexican footballer

== See also ==
- Jan Carlos Hurtado (born 2000), Venezuelan footballer
- Jorge Carlos Hurtado Valdez (born 1949), Mexican politician
- Juan Carlos Hurtado Miller (born 1940), Peruvian politician
