= Claudia Serrano =

Chilean politician

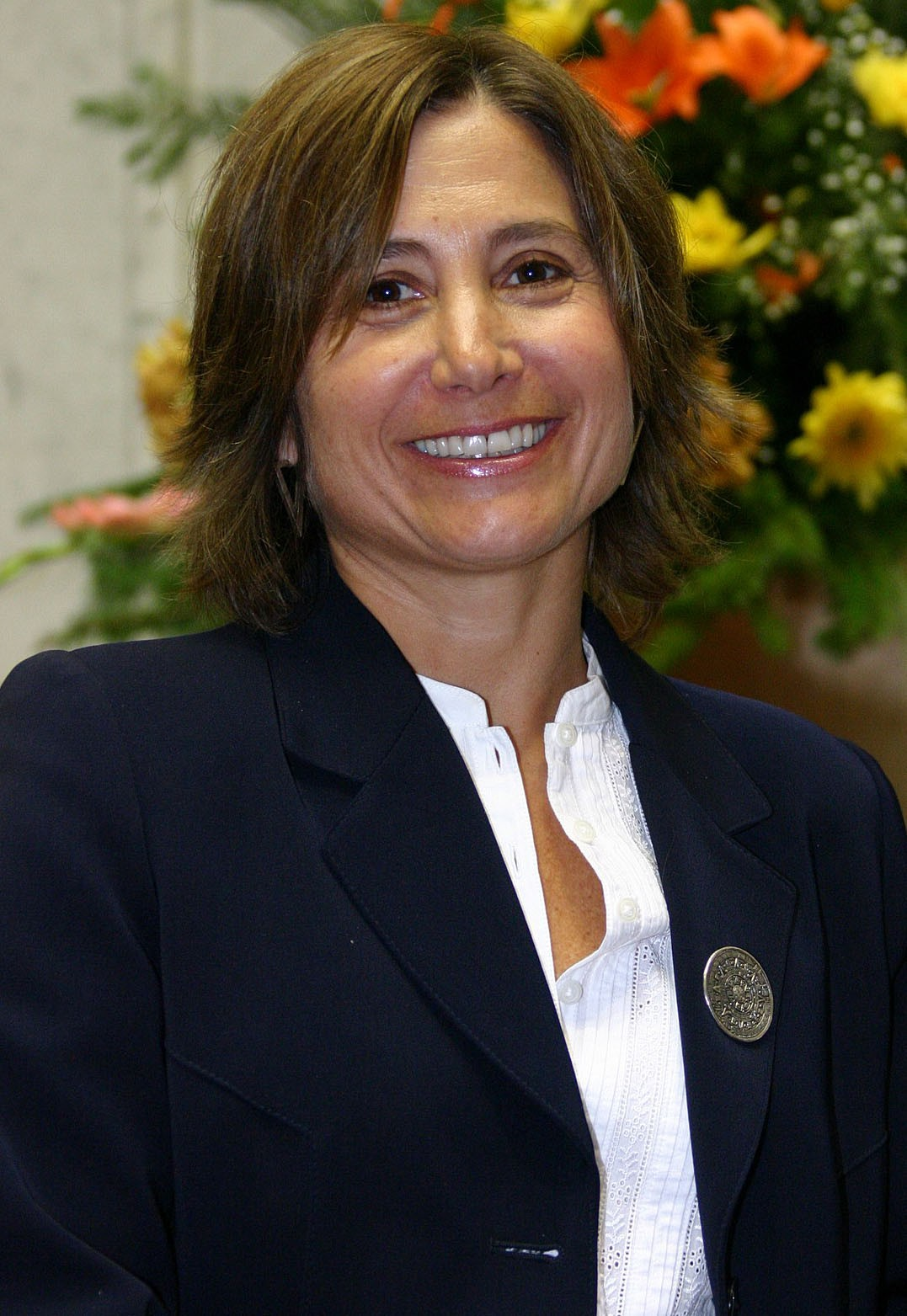

Ambassador of Chile at OECD
- In office 27 March 2014 – 11 March 2018
- Preceded by: Ignacio Briones
- Succeeded by: Felipe Morandé

Ministry of Labor and Social Provision
- In office 15 December 2008 – 11 March 2010
- Preceded by: Osvaldo Andrade
- Succeeded by: Camila Merino

Personal details
- Born: 16 August 1957 (age 69) Santiago, Chile
- Party: Socialist Party
- Spouse(s): José Miguel Crispi; Patricio Tapia
- Children: Miguel Crispi
- Education: Pontifical Catholic University of Chile (B.Sc); University of Chile (M.Sc); School for Advanced Studies in the Social Sciences (PhD)
- Occupation: Researcher, Scholar and Politician
- Profession: Sociologist

Claudia Inés Serrano Madrid (born 17 February 1957) is a Chilean politician and sociologist who served as minister during the first government of Michelle Bachelet (2006–2010).

She served as Undersecretary of Regional and Administrative Development (SUBDERE) from 2006 to 2008 during the first administration of President Michelle Bachelet. She subsequently served as Minister of Labor and Social Welfare, becoming the second woman to hold that office, from 2008 to 2010.

== Family and education ==
She earned a bachelor's degree in sociology from the Pontifical Catholic University of Chile (PUC) and later obtained a master's degree in public management and public policy from the Department of Industrial Engineering at the University of Chile. She also completed a doctorate in sociology at the École des Hautes Études en Sciences Sociales in Paris, France.

Her son, Miguel Crispi, from her first marriage to José Miguel Crispi, served as president of the PUC Student Federation (FEUC) in 2009. In March 2022, he was appointed Undersecretary of Regional and Administrative Development in the administration of President Gabriel Boric.

She is married in her second marriage to fellow socialist Patricio Tapia Santibáñez, who served as general manager of the state-owned Correos de Chile between 2006 and 2010.

At the beginning of her professional career, in 1983, she worked as a researcher at the Corporation for Latin American Economic Research (CIEPLAN).

== Political career ==
In 1989, she served as technical secretary of the Women's Commission of the government program prepared by the then-opposition Concertación de Partidos por la Democracia.

Between 1990 and 1994, she was General Director of Social and Cultural Policy for the Municipality of Santiago. She then became head of the Programs Department of the Solidarity and Social Investment Fund (FOSIS), a position she held until 1995.

In March 2006, President Michelle Bachelet appointed her Undersecretary of Regional and Administrative Development. She left that position at the end of 2008 to become Minister of Labor and Social Welfare, replacing her fellow party member Osvaldo Andrade.

After leaving office with the end of the administration in March 2010, she was elected Executive Director of Rimisp – Latin American Center for Rural Development.

In March 2014, during the second Bachelet administration, she was appointed ambassador to the Organisation for Economic Co-operation and Development (OECD).

Among her notable publications are Decentralización. Nudos críticos (CIEPLAN–Asesorías para el Desarrollo, 2001); Políticas sociales, mujeres y Gobierno local (CIEPLAN, 1992); Participación social y ciudadanía, an internal working paper (MIDEPLAN, 1999); and Vivir la pobreza. Testimonios de mujeres (CIEPLAN, 1985).
