= Luis Alvarado Constenla =

Chilean politician (1940–2025)

Ambassador of Chile to Cuba
- In office 1995–1998
- President: Eduardo Frei Ruíz-Tagle
- Preceded by: Patricio Pozo
- Succeeded by: Eduardo Araya Alemparte

Minister of National Assets
- In office 11 March 1990 – 11 March 1994
- President: Patricio Aylwin
- Preceded by: Armando Álvarez Marín
- Succeeded by: Adriana Delpiano

Personal details
- Born: 29 November 1940 Santiago, Chile
- Died: 2025 (aged 84–85)
- Party: Socialist Party; Party for Democracy (1987–2025; his death)
- Education: University of Chile (BA); Pontifical Catholic University of Chile (MA); Paris 1 Panthéon-Sorbonne University (Ph.D.)
- Occupation: Politician
- Profession: Geographer

Luis Rafael Alvarado Constenla (29 November 1940 – 2025) was a Chilean politician who served as minister of State under Patricio Aylwin's government (1994–2000). He also served as ambassador of Chile to Cuba.

== Life and career ==
Alvarado Constenla studied geography at the University of Chile and later pursued studies in sociology at the same institution. While living in Paris, France, he studied social sciences at the Sorbonne University. He later completed a postgraduate degree in Urban and Regional Development at the Pontifical Catholic University of Chile.

As a member of the Socialist Party of Chile (PS), he worked on the technical teams of Salvador Allende’s presidential campaign in 1970. In 1973, the year of Allende’s overthrow, he was detained at the National Stadium of Santiago and later transferred to the detention camp of Chacabuco Saltpeter Works in northern Chile.

During the military dictatorship led by General Augusto Pinochet, he lived in exile in Argentina and Guatemala. He returned to Chile in 1980. In the late 1980s, he also joined the Party for Democracy (PPD). Within the Socialist Party, he served as a member of the Central Committee, the Political Commission, and the Executive Committee. He was elected undersecretary of the Unified Socialist Party shortly before the end of the Pinochet regime.

Following the victory of Patricio Aylwin, the candidate of the Concertación, in the 1989 Chilean presidential election, he was appointed Minister of National Assets, a position he held until 1994.

During the government of Eduardo Frei Ruiz-Tagle, he was appointed political ambassador of Chile to Tunisia and Cuba (1995–1998).

Among his later activities was his participation on the board of the magazine Siete + 7, now defunct, as well as serving on the board of Correos de Chile.

Alvarado Constenla died in 2025.
