= Irureta =

Irureta is a surname. Notable people with the surname include:

- Elena Irureta (born 1955), Spanish actress
- Javier Irureta (born 1948), Spanish football manager and former attacking midfielder
- Narciso Irureta (1924–2005), Chilean politician
- Xabi Irureta (born 1986), Spanish football goalkeeper
