= Cristián Bowen =

Chilean engineer, consultant and former public official

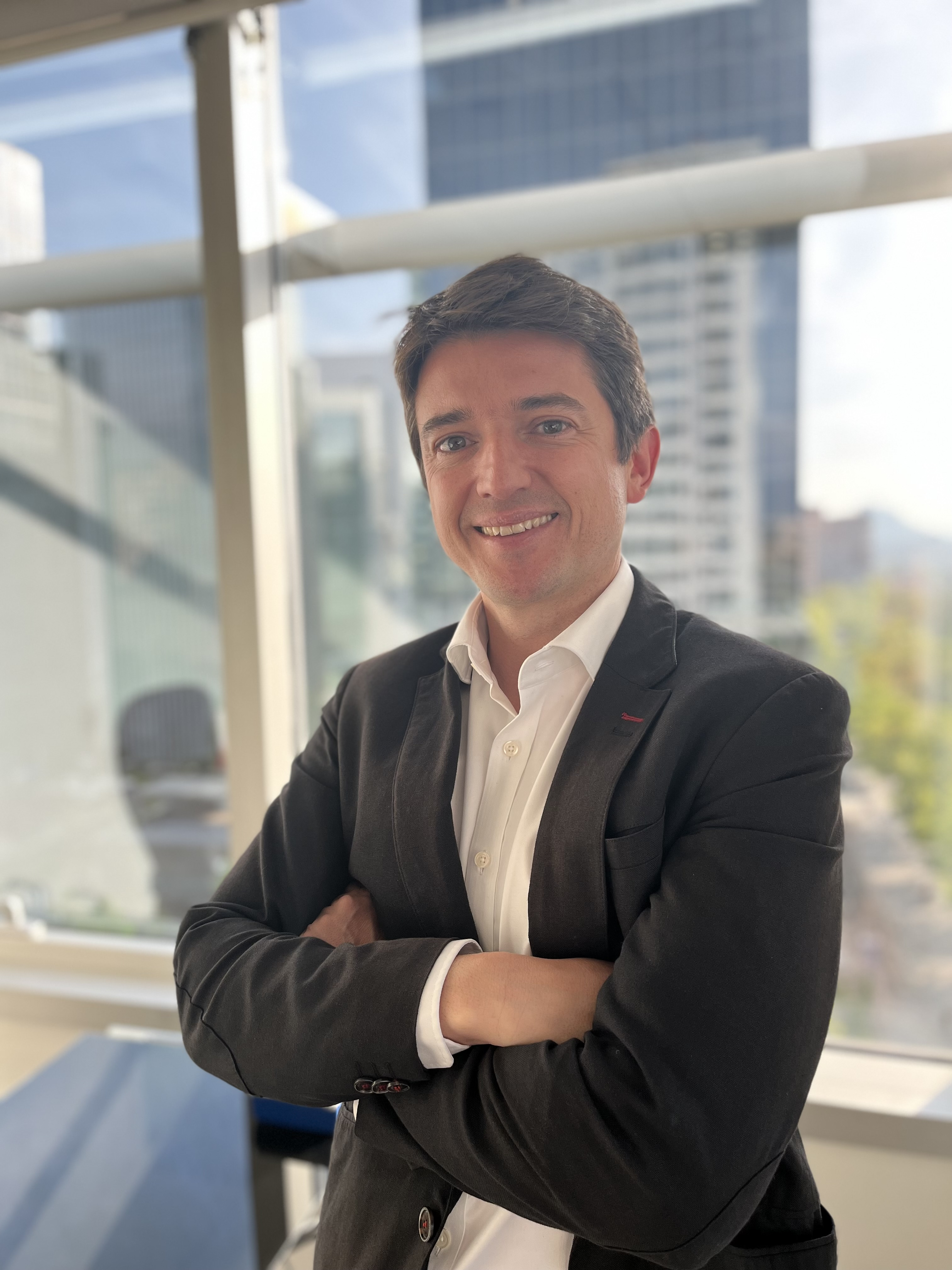

Undersecretary of Transport of Chile
- In office 11 March 2014 – 18 November 2016
- Preceded by: Gloria Hutt
- Succeeded by: Carlos Melo

Personal details
- Born: 18 April 1980 (age 46) Santiago, Chile
- Party: Christian Democracy
- Spouse: Alejandra Wormald
- Children: Three
- Parent(s): Juan Cristián Bowen; María Gabriela Garfias
- Education: Pontifical Catholic University of Chile; Harvard Kennedy School
- Occupation: Industrial engineer and consultant specialized in transport, energy, and innovation
- Profession: Engineer

Cristián Andrés Bowen Garfias (Santiago, April 18, 1980) is a Chilean industrial engineer, consultant, and former public official. He served as Undersecretary of Transportation during the second government of President Michelle Bachelet, from 2014 to 2016. Since leaving public service, he has focused on consulting in energy, mobility, and innovation, advising organizations such as Copec Wind Garage and previously the Delegation of the European Union in Chile under the Global Gateway program.

== Family and studies ==
Born in Providencia, he is the son of programmer Juan Cristián Bowen del Valle and social worker María Gabriela Garfias Alcérreca.

He studied industrial civil engineering and economics at the Pontifical Catholic University of Chile (PUC) and then completed a master's degree in public administration at Harvard University, United States. He has been married to psychologist Alejandra Wormald Langdon since 2010, and they have twins.

== Public career ==
During 2005 he was executive director of the "Corporación Construyendo Futuro". From 2006 to 2007, during Michelle Bachelet's first government, he served as an advisor to the Ministry of Transport and Telecommunications (MTT).

He also worked as a partner of Neoner, the Non-Conventional Renewable Energy Company, and as a board member and advisor on administrative and legislative matters. Later, he served as the executive director of "Fundación América Solidaria". From 2008 to 2010, he worked as a parliamentary advisor in the areas of Transport, Public Works, and Telecommunications.

In the municipal elections of 2012, he was candidate for mayor of the commune of Renca. He was part of Claudio Orrego's territorial team in the primary elections and later joined Michelle Bachelet's presidential campaign in the "Programmatic Commission of Transportation". He worked as an associate consultant for "CIS, Ingenieros Consultores" until 2014.

After Michelle Bachelet won the presidency, he served as Undersecretary of Transportation from March 11, 2014, until November 18, 2016, when President Bachelet made a cabinet change.

== Recent professional career ==
After leaving government, Bowen shifted his focus to the private sector and consulting in energy and innovation.

- He is an associate consultant at CIS Consultores.
- From 2019 to 2024, he was a partner and executive director at Infinity H2, a company developing hydrogen-based technologies for mining trucks and power generation.
- From 2022 until late 2024, he advised the Delegation of the European Union in Chile under the Global Gateway program, promoting investments in renewable hydrogen, lithium, copper, and sustainable transport.
- He is currently a strategic advisor at Copec Wind Garage, leading projects in electric mobility, charging infrastructure, and new energies.

== Publications ==
- Bowen, C. (2017). "Implementación del sistema Transantiago en Chile y su impacto en el mercado laboral del sector transporte." Boletín FAL, No. 360, August 2017. United Nations Economic Commission for Latin America and the Caribbean (ECLAC).
- Bowen, C. (2008). "On the approximation bias to benefit measures in discrete choice models." International Journal of Transport Economics, Vol. XXXV, No. 2, June 2008.
