= María Eugenia Manaud =

Chilean judge

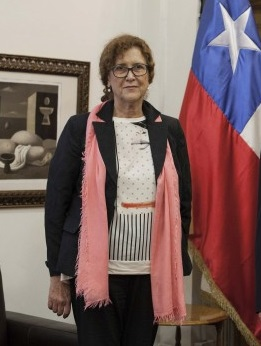

President of the State Defense Council of Chile
- In office 12 March 2017 – 15 April 2020
- Appointed by: Michelle Bachelet
- President: Michelle Bachelet; Sebastián Piñera
- Preceded by: Juan Ignacio Piña
- Succeeded by: Juan Antonio Peribonio

Personal details
- Born: 19 January 1949 (age 77) Santiago, Chile
- Education: Pontifical Catholic University of Valparaíso (BA)
- Profession: Lawyer

María Eugenia Manaud Tapia (born 21 January 1949) is a Chilean lawyer who has served as president of the Consejo de Defensa del Estado.

== Biography ==
=== Career ===
Manaud obtained her Bachelor of Arts in laws at the Pontificia Universidad Católica de Valparaíso (PUCV). From 1975 and 1982, she worked at the Comptroller General of Chile, both in its headquarters in Santiago and Valparaíso. There, she became the representative of the Comptroller in front of the General Customs Board and Deputy Head of the Public Credit Subdivision and National Assets.

In 1982−87, she served as legal head of the State company Correos de Chile («Chilean Postal Company»). Similarly, she was attorney secretary of that board.

In December 1990, Manaud joined the State Defense Council of Chile (CDE), taking over as head of the Inspection Department in 1992. In May 1993, she was appointed Attorney General of Santiago, position dedicated to the creation, organization and direction of that regional division. In October 1995, she was appointed counselor.

From 2000 to 2007, she helped with the Public Ministry as advisor of the National Prosecutor in legislative and international affairs. Likewise, she created the Specialized Unit for Economic Crimes and Officials.

== General Comptroller of Chile ==
In 2007, Manaud was polled as a candidate for National Prosecutor as well as for Comptroller General in 2015. Finally, on 12 March 2017, she was appointed by President Michelle Bachelet to preside over the CDE after the resignation of Juan Ignacio Piña.
