= Juan Carlos Muñoz (politician) =

Chilean politician

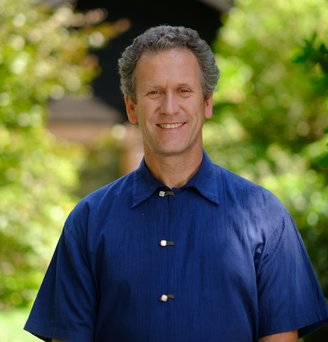

Minister of Transportation and Telecommunications
- In office 11 March 2022 – 11 March 2026
- President: Gabriel Boric
- Preceded by: Gloria Hutt
- Succeeded by: Louis de Grange

Personal details
- Born: 22 June 1970 (age 56) Vina del Mar, Chile
- Party: Independent
- Parent(s): Juan Carlos Muñoz Frías; María Ximena Abogabir Scott
- Education: Pontifical Catholic University of Chile (BA); University of California, Berkeley (MA) (Ph.D.)
- Occupation: Politician
- Profession: Civil engineer

Juan Carlos Muñoz Abogabir (born 22 June 1970) is a Chilean politician and civil engineer who served as Minister of Transportation and Telecommunications.

== Family and education ==
He is the son of Juan Carlos Muñoz Frías and María Ximena Abogabir Scott. He completed his primary and secondary education at Craighouse School in the commune of Lo Barnechea. He later pursued higher education in industrial civil engineering, with a specialization in transportation systems, at the Pontifical Catholic University of Chile (PUC). He subsequently earned a doctorate in civil and environmental engineering from the University of California, Berkeley, in the United States.

== Professional career ==
With an extensive academic background, he has worked in research areas focused on transportation operations, public transport systems, logistics and traffic flow theory, among others.

He served as a professor in the Department of Transport and Logistics Engineering at the Pontifical Catholic University of Chile from 1995 to 2022. He was director of the Centro de Desarrollo Urbano Sustentable (CEDEUS), an institution promoted by the PUC and the University of Concepción aimed at contributing to sustainable development from multiple perspectives, including territorial planning, transportation systems and land use. He also served as the first director of the Institute for Sustainable Development at the PUC.

Between 2003 and 2004, he served as an adviser to Javier Etcheberry, then Minister of Transport and Telecommunications, for the Transantiago public transport plan. In 2008, he was also a member of an expert committee established by the same ministry to improve the Transantiago project. He served on the board of directors of Metro Regional de Valparaíso (Merval), was a director of Metro in Santiago, and acted as an adviser to the Metropolitan Public Transport Directorate. He founded and directed for eight years the Bus Rapid Transit Centre of Excellence, a research center funded by the Volvo Educational and Research Foundation.

During the second government of Sebastián Piñera, he served on the Scientific Committee on Climate Change of the Ministry of Science, Technology, Knowledge and Innovation and participated in various international scientific committees related to his field of expertise.

On 21 January 2022, he was appointed Minister of Transport and Telecommunications by then president-elect Gabriel Boric. He assumed office on 11 March 2022.

In 2026, the US Department of State revoked the US visas of Muñoz and his family in a dispute over a planned undersea fiber optic cable connecting Chile and Easter Island with China. The US claimed these were "activities that compromised critical telecommunications infrastructure and eroded regional security". After the project was shelved, the US reinstated the visas.
