= Andrés Gómez-Lobo =

Chilean politician

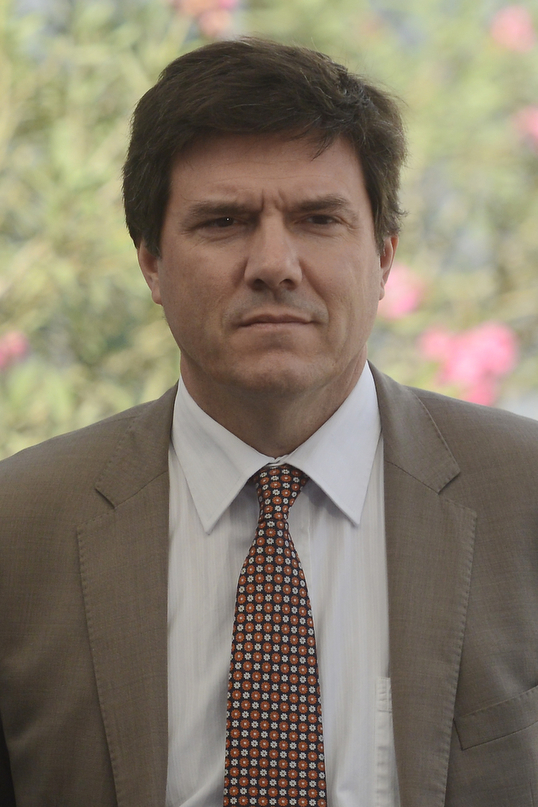

Minister of Transport and Telecommunications
- In office 11 March 2014 – 14 March 2017
- President: Michelle Bachelet
- Preceded by: Pedro Pablo Errázuriz
- Succeeded by: Paola Tapia

Personal details
- Born: 16 March 1965 (age 61) Frankfurt, Germany
- Party: Party for Democracy
- Education: Pontifical Catholic University of Chile (B.Sc); University College London (M.Sc)
- Occupation: Scholar
- Profession: Economist

Andrés Gómez-Lobo Echenique (born 17 March 1965) is a Chilean economist and scholar who served as Minister of Transport and Telecommunications during the second government of Michelle Bachelet.

== Early life and education ==
Gómez-Lobo was born in Frankfurt, Germany, to philosopher Alfonso Gómez-Lobo Morelli and Jimena Teresa Echenique Larraín. After completing a degree in business administration with a specialization in economics at the Pontifical Catholic University of Chile, he earned a Master of Science in environmental and natural resource economics and later a PhD in economics from University College London.

His research interests include environmental and natural resource economics, the regulation of natural monopolies, and industrial organization.

Gómez-Lobo has been a researcher at CIEPLAN and a consultant for the World Bank and Oxera in the United Kingdom.

== Political career ==
Gómez-Lobo served on the board of directors of the Santiago Metro between 2008 and 2010. During the same period, he was chief adviser at the Ministry of Transport and Telecommunications, having joined the ministry after René Cortázar was appointed minister amid the Transantiago crisis.

In early 2014, President-elect Michelle Bachelet appointed Gómez-Lobo as Minister of Transport and Telecommunications. He took office on 11 March 2014 at the start of Bachelet's second administration. Among the principal issues he faced were criticism of Transantiago, operational failures on the Santiago Metro in November 2014, and the dispute between Uber and taxi drivers.

He remained in office until 13 March 2017, when he resigned citing personal reasons. He was succeeded by Paola Tapia.
