= Jacqueline Weinstein =

Chilean politician

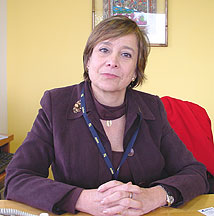
- Weinstein in 2017

Minister of National Assets
- In office 6 January 2010 – 11 March 2010
- Preceded by: Romy Schmidt
- Succeeded by: Catalina Parot

Undersecretary of National Assets
- In office 25 February 2004 – 11 March 2006
- Preceded by: Paulina Saball
- Succeeded by: Lorraine Margot

Personal details
- Born: 12 April 1948 (age 78) Santiago, Chile
- Party: Party for Democracy
- Spouse: Jaime Estévez
- Children: Two
- Parent(s): Jorge Weinstein; Luna Levy
- Education: University of Chile (B.Sc and M.Sc)
- Occupation: Politician
- Profession: Economist

Jacqueline Marta Weinstein Levy (born 12 April 1948) is a Chilean economist who served as minister during the first government of Michelle Bachelet (2006–2010).

== Family and education ==
She is the daughter of Jorge Weinstein Winocur and Luna Levy Camhi, both of Jewish heritage. She was married to politician Jaime Estévez, with whom she had two children, Paula Isabel and Rodrigo Antonio.

She studied economics at the University of Chile, where she later completed postgraduate studies specializing in organizational management and public policy. After graduating, she joined the state-owned CORFO during the administration of the Popular Unity government.

== Public career ==
After returning to Chile, she joined a non-governmental organization. In the early 1990s, she entered public service through the Chilean Agency for International Development Cooperation (AGCI), then operating under the Ministry of Planning and Cooperation (Mideplan). In 1994, she became Director of Planning and Budget at the Ministry of National Assets.

Between 1997 and 2003, she worked at the Ministry of Foreign Affairs, serving successively as adviser to the Directorate of International Economic Affairs, Executive Director of AGCI, and Deputy Director of ProChile.

From 2004 to 2006, she served as Undersecretary of National Assets during the administration of President Ricardo Lagos.

In 2006, she became Executive Director of the Interactive Mirador Museum, a position she held until January 2010, when she was appointed Minister of National Assets. She served in that capacity during the final two months of the first presidency of Michelle Bachelet.

As minister, on 27 January 2010 she announced the transfer of state-owned land to the Representative Committee of Jewish Entities in Chile for the construction of a Holocaust memorial. The announcement was made during the commemoration of the International Day of Remembrance of the Victims of the Holocaust, held in the O'Higgins Hall of the Ministry of Foreign Affairs.

She currently works as an independent consultant and serves on a number of institutional boards. Since 2017, she has been a member of the board of directors of Empresa Portuaria Austral.
