= Felipe Morandé =

Chilean politician (b. 1955)

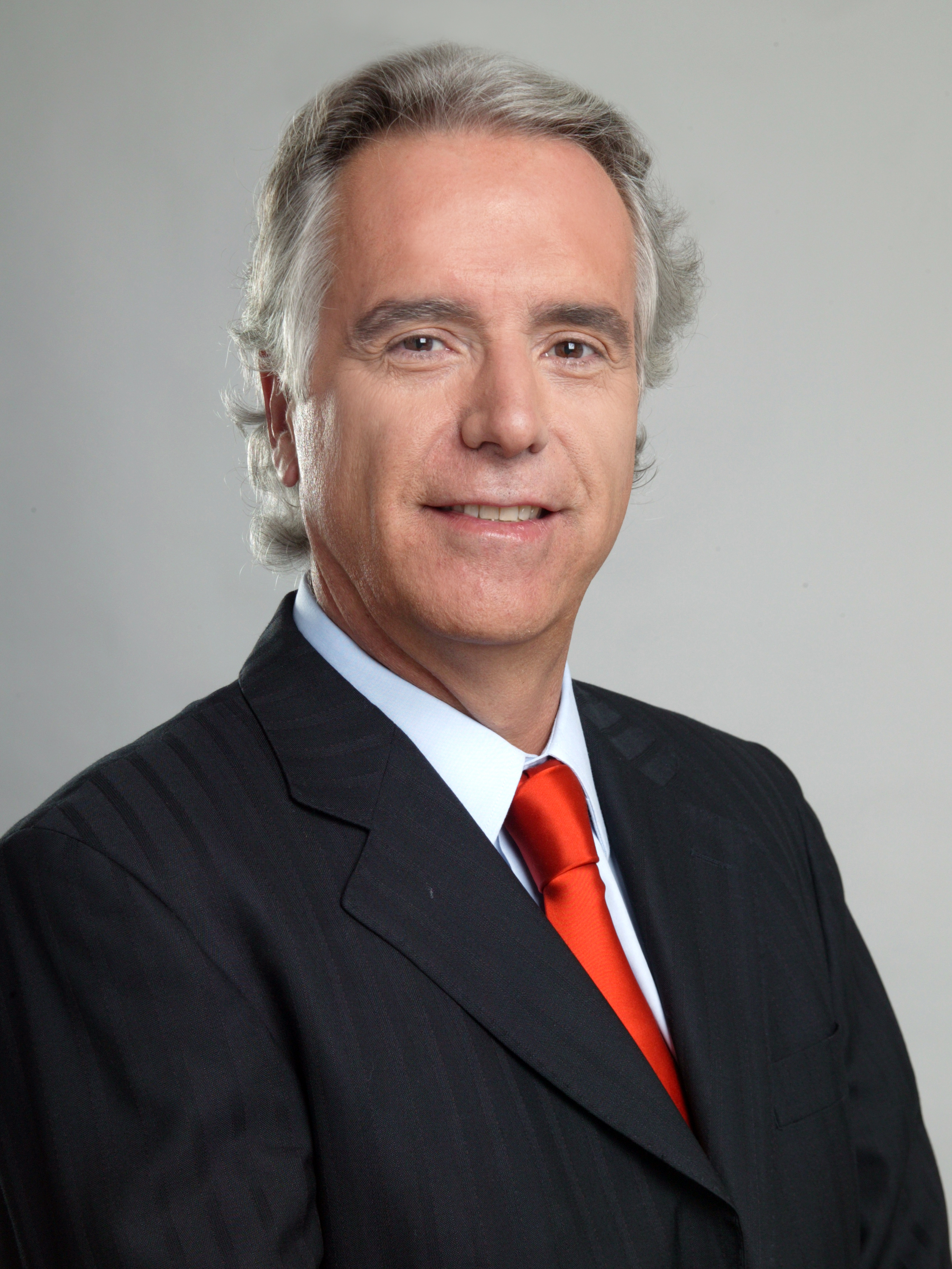
- Official portrait (2010)

Ambassador of Chile in the OECD
- In office 11 March 2018 – 15 April 2022
- Preceded by: Claudia Serrano
- Succeeded by: Francisco Saffie

Minister of Transport and Telecommunications
- In office 11 March 2010 – 14 January 2011
- President: Sebastián Pinera
- Preceded by: René Cortázar
- Succeeded by: Pedro Pablo Errázuriz

Personal details
- Born: 19 May 1955 (age 71) Santiago, Chile
- Party: Evópoli (since 2013)
- Spouse: Carola Zúñiga
- Education: Pontifical Catholic University of Chile (LL.B); University of Minnesota (LL.M)
- Occupation: Politician
- Profession: Lawyer

Felipe Guillermo Morandé Lavín (born 15 May 1955) is a Chilean politician and lawyer who was the dean of the Universidad Mayor.

In 2018, the President Sebastián Piñera during his second government (2018–2022) appointed him as the Ambassador of Chile in the OECD.

== Professional career ==
He began his professional life at a young age at CIEPLAN and the Central Bank of Chile, where he worked as a research assistant on various studies. Between 1978 and 1979 he worked in the research department of Banco Hipotecario de Chile. His areas of specialization included macroeconomics, monetary economics, international economics, econometrics and industrial organization.

He started his academic career in the Department of Economics at the University of Minnesota (1979–1982), and later joined the University of Houston (1982–1986), both in the United States.

Upon returning to Chile, he taught at the University of Santiago, Chile and at the Ilades/Georgetown program, where he served as director between 1990 and 1996. At that institution he also directed, until February 1997, the Economic Advisory Work for the National Congress (TASC), which he founded in 1990.

Between March 1997 and December 2001 he served as Director of Research and Chief Economist at the Central Bank of Chile. From April 2002 to July 2006 he was Research Manager at the Chilean Chamber of Construction.

He has served as consultant to the World Bank, the International Monetary Fund, the Inter-American Development Bank, AID, IDRC (Canada), ECLAC, the Central Reserve Bank of Peru, the Ministry of Health of Chile, the National Environment Commission (Conama), the Ministry of Finance of Chile, Ciedla (Buenos Aires), the Government of Bolivia (Udape), Japan’s Economic Planning Agency, WIDER (Helsinki), the Ministry of Public Works of Chile, among other public and private institutions.

Until 2010 he was dean of the Faculty of Economics and Business, University of Chile, where he also served as full professor until early 2011.

He was macro-coordinator and coordinator of the Infrastructure Commission of the Tantauco Group, which advised the presidential candidacy of Sebastián Piñera, a former university classmate.

== Political career ==
In February 2010 he was appointed by Piñera as a|minister of State, assuming office on 11 March. He left the cabinet during the first ministerial reshuffle carried out by the president in early 2011.

In 2012 he became dean of the Faculty of Economic and Business Sciences at the Universidad Mayor.

That same year he joined the programmatic advisory council of Renovación Nacional (RN) presidential pre-candidate Andrés Allamand. After Allamand’s defeat in the 2013 governing coalition primary, he became chief program coordinator for Evelyn Matthei, who replaced the primary winner, Pablo Longueira.

At the beginning of that year he had been invited by the Minister of Finance, Felipe Larraín, to join the Fiscal Policy Advisory Council.
