= Gloria Hutt =

Chilean civil engineer and politician (b. 1955)

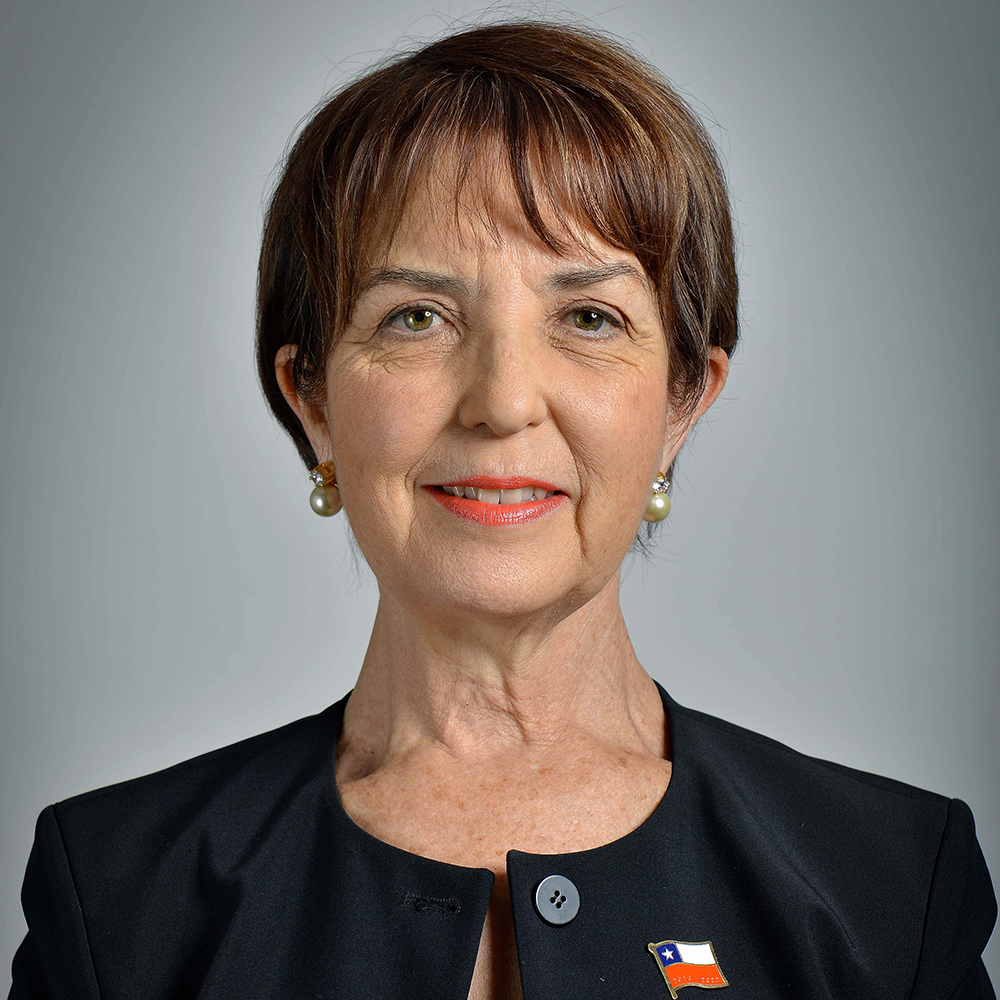
- Official portrait (2018)

Member of the Constitutional Council
- In office 7 June 2023 – 7 November 2023
- Constituency: Santiago Metropolitan Region

Minister of Transport and Telecommunications
- In office 11 March 2018 – 11 March 2022
- President: Sebastián Piñera
- Preceded by: Paola Tapia
- Succeeded by: Juan Carlos Muñoz Abogabir

Undersecretary of Transports
- In office 11 March 2010 – 11 March 2014
- Preceded by: Raúl Erazo Torricelli
- Succeeded by: Cristián Bowen

Personal details
- Born: 31 January 1955 (age 71) Santiago, Chile
- Party: Evópoli
- Spouse: Felipe Cossio (1976–2020; died in 2020)
- Children: Five
- Education: Pontifical Catholic University of Chile (B.Sc); Georgetown University (M.Sc)
- Occupation: Politician
- Profession: Civil engineer

Gloria Hutt Hesse (born 31 January 1955) is a Chilean civil engineer and politician, affiliated with the Political Evolution Party (Evópoli). She has served as Undersecretary and Minister of Transport and Telecommunications of Chile, and as a member of the Constitutional Council.

In October 2022 Hutt was elected president of Evópoli. Within the party she is considered close to Ignacio Briones and more distant to the founding group of the party which is more classically right-wing and includes Felipe Kast and Luciano Cruz-Coke.

In the 1990s, she was the vice-president of CEMA Chile, an organization linked to Lucía Hiriart, wife of dictator Augusto Pinochet.

== Biography ==
Hutt Hesse was born in Santiago on 31 January 1955, the daughter of Jerman Hutt Gunther and Adriana Hesse Godoy. She has one sister, Constanza. During her childhood, she lived in San Antonio, where her father was assigned, and later in Santiago. She is widowed and the mother of three children.

Hutt studied civil engineering at the Pontifical Catholic University of Chile (PUC). During 1974 and 1975, she pursued part of her studies at the University of Brasília, before interrupting her education to live in the United States. She obtained her degree as a civil engineer with a specialization in transportation systems in 1983.

In 2002, she completed an advanced program in International Finance at Georgetown University.

== Professional career ==
Between 1982 and 1983, Hutt worked as an advisor and engineer in the library system of the Pontifical Catholic University of Chile. In 1984, she served as coordinator of systems for agreement management and academic performance evaluation at the Ministry of Education of Chile.

From 1985 to 1986, she worked as administrative manager at DICTUC, and in 1987 as assistant to the director at the Executive Directorate of the Rectorate of the Pontifical Catholic University of Chile. In 1988, she served as deputy manager of administration and finance at Chilena de Moldeados S.A. (CHIMOLSA).

In 1990, Hutt worked as executive director at the Foundation for Development of the Pontifical Catholic University of Chile. During the same period, she pursued further studies in Business Administration at Georgetown University. Upon returning to Chile, she lived in Arica, where in 1991 she served as a lecturer at the University of Tarapacá.

Between 1992 and 1993, she worked as executive secretary of the Technical Fisheries Committee of Arica and was a panelist on the television program Buenos Días Arica, broadcast by Channel 11 of the Catholic University of the North.

From 1994 to 1995, Hutt worked as a manager at the Puerto Pesquero Real Estate Company in San Antonio and as technical manager at the Association of Fishing Industry Employers of the Fifth and Sixth Regions. In 1997 and again in 2008, she served as head of the Chilean office of the consulting firm Steer Davies Gleave, and from June 2008 to March 2010, she was the firm’s director for Latin America.

Until December 2017, she served as an advisor to the board of directors of the transportation company Turbus. Between July 2014 and December 2017, she was also a partner at Quiz Consultores, conducting multiple studies and consultancies in passenger demand for air and land transport, traffic risk analysis, revenue projections, and technical reports.

== Political career ==
In 2010, she was appointed Undersecretary of Transport during the first administration of President Sebastián Piñera, serving from 11 March 2010 to 11 March 2014. In March 2018, during the second administration of President Piñera, Hutt was appointed Minister of Transport and Telecommunications, a position she held until March 2022.

In 2016, she joined Political Evolution Party (Evópoli), where she served as national coordinator and, since October 2022, as national president of the party.

In the elections held on 7 May 2023, she ran as a candidate for the Constitutional Council representing the 7th Senatorial District of the Metropolitan Region of Santiago, as a member of Evópoli within the Chile Seguro coalition. According to the Electoral Court of Chile (TRICEL), she was elected with 236,292 votes.
