= Claudio Hohmann =

Chilean politician (born 1954)

Minister of Transport and Telecommunications
- In office 28 September 1996 – 11 March 2000
- President: Eduardo Frei Ruíz-Tagle
- Preceded by: Narciso Irureta
- Succeeded by: Carlos Cruz Lorenzen

Undersecretary of Transport
- In office 11 March 1994 – 28 September 1996
- Preceded by: Sergio González Tagle
- Succeeded by: Andrés Wallis

Personal details
- Born: 3 June 1954 (age 72) Santiago, Chile
- Party: Close to the Christian Democratic Party (1994−2011); Close to Renovación Nacional (2012−2013)
- Spouse: Marina Hewstone
- Children: Five
- Parent(s): Víctor Hogmann; Yenni Barrientos
- Education: Pontifical Catholic University of Chile (LL.B)
- Occupation: Politician
- Profession: Lawyer

Claudio Felipe Hohmann Barrientos (born 3 June 1954) is a Chilean politician who served as minister of State under Eduardo Frei Ruíz-Tagle's government (1994–2000).

In 2012, he ended his link with the centre-left coalition Concertación de Partidos por la Democracia and supported to the right-wing pre-candidate Andrés Allamand.

== Early life and education ==
He is the son of Víctor René Hohmann Gerlach and Yenni Barrientos Momberg, both of German descent. He attended Colegio San Mateo in Osorno and later studied civil engineering, specializing in transportation systems, at the Pontifical Catholic University of Chile.

He is married to Marina Hewstone Arqueros, with whom he has five children: Daniel, Melissa, Mary Anne, Sally, and Maximiliano.

== Political career ==
In the early 1980s, Hohmann worked at the Executive Secretariat of the Urban Transport Commission, where he participated in several transportation initiatives.

Between 1990 and 1992, he served as head of the Urban Transport Advisory Team at the Ministry of Transport and Telecommunications. In this role, he coordinated the tendering process for bus routes in downtown Santiago and the implementation of a deferred bus stop system for public transportation in the city center, among other projects.

In 1993, as Planning and Development Manager of the State Railways Company (EFE), he led the privatization of the freight division, resulting in the creation of Fepasa and Ferronor. From March 1994 to September 1996, he served as Undersecretary of Transport. In September 1996, following the resignation of Narciso Irureta, he was appointed Minister of Transport and Telecommunications. He remained in office until 2000, when the administration of Eduardo Frei Ruiz-Tagle ended.

After leaving government, Hohmann entered the private sector. He served as president of the Association of Public Infrastructure Concessionaires (Copsa) from 2003 to 2006, and later became Corporate Affairs Manager at Distribución y Servicio (D&S), subsequently Walmart Chile, a position he held from 2006 to 2012.

Between 2012 and 2013, he served on the programmatic advisory council of National Renewal (RN) presidential candidate Andrés Allamand during his campaign for the Presidency of Chile.
