= Pedro Pablo Errázuriz =

Chilean engineer and politician (born 1961)

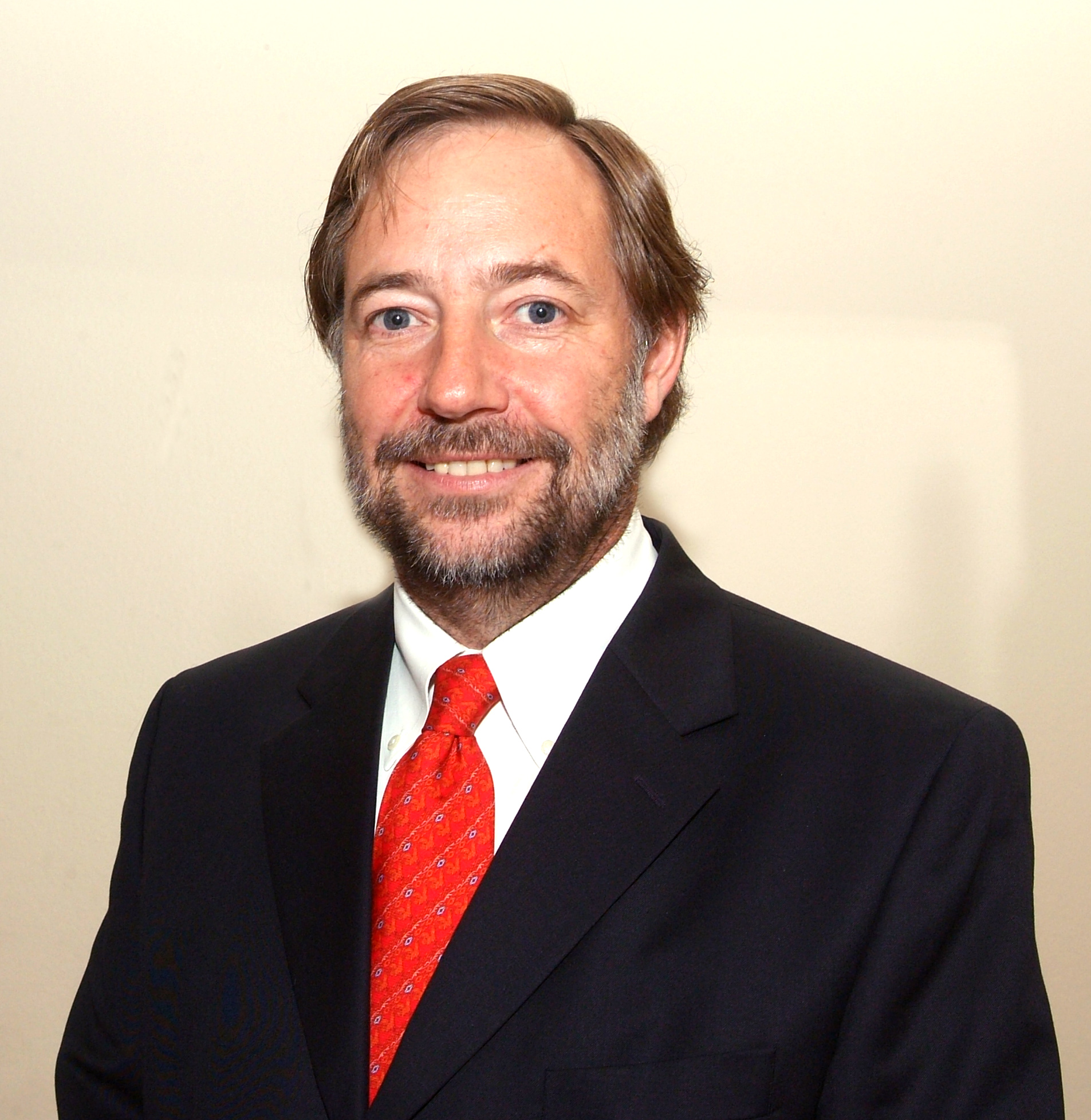

Minister of Transport and Telecommunications
- In office 16 January 2011 – 11 March 2014
- President: Sebastián Piñera
- Preceded by: Felipe Morandé
- Succeeded by: Andrés Gómez-Lobo

Personal details
- Born: 29 March 1961 (age 65) Santiago, Chile
- Party: Independent close to centre-right (2006–2013); Evópoli (2013–)
- Parent(s): Pedro Pablo Errázuriz Ossa; Berta Domínguez Covarruvias
- Education: Pontifical Catholic University of Chile; London School of Economics (MA)
- Occupation: Politician
- Profession: Lawyer

Pedro Pablo Errázuriz Domínguez (born 29 March 1961) is a Chilean engineer, politician. He was Minister of Transport and Telecommunications in the first government of President Sebastián Piñera (2010–2014).

== Early life ==
He was born from the marriage of Pedro Pablo Errázuriz Ossa and Berta Domínguez Covarrubias, who had five other children. Among his uncles are the cardinal and archbishop of Santiago Francisco Javier Errázuriz (1998–2010) and the businessman Juan Eduardo Errázuriz, Sigdo Koppers group shareholder.

Like his father and his grandfather, Errázuriz studied civil engineering at the Pontifical Catholic University of Chile (PUC), where he obtained a specialization in hydraulics. There, he met with Laurence Golborne, future cabinetmate in Piñera's first government. Later, he completed master's degree in engineering sciences at the same university and Master of Science in management science/operational research/finance at London School of Economics.

== Political career ==
In 1990s, he worked in various local and international subsidiaries of the generator Endesa, from where he was sent to LANChile, at the request of then senator Sebastián Piñera, who was one of the airline's controlling shareholders. As an executive of this company, he separated the business areas in cargo and passenger transport, process that incidentally allowed modernizing and making the ticket acquisition system more flexible. Later, he was appointed as the LAN Express general manager and also as vice-president of corporate planning.

In 2006, Errázuriz joined the Essbio utility, where first he was general manager and later president, as well as Esval. In this last position, he was a direct interlocutor of various ministers of Piñera after the earthquake of February 27, 2010, which caused serious damage to the company's drinking water production and distribution systems in the company Biobío Region.

In early 2011, he assumed as Minister of Transport and Telecommunications during Piñera's first government. During his spell number portability was implemented and the start of the process of collection's end for long-distance calls into the country.

At the end of 2013, he joined Evolución Politica (Evópoli), a conservative-liberal and centre-right party, as a director. On 8 April 2014, he joined the National Urban Development Council, created by Socialist President Michelle Bachelet (centre-left).

In May 2018, he was appointed as the president of Empresa de Ferrocarriles del Estado (EFE), within the framework of the second government of Piñera.
