= Carlos Cruz Lorenzen =

Chilean politician

Ministry of Transportation and Telecommunications
- In office 11 March 2000 – 7 February 2002
- President: Ricardo Lagos
- Preceded by: Claudio Hohmann
- Succeeded by: Javier Etcheberry

Personal details
- Born: 13 October 1951 (age 74) Santiago, Chile
- Party: Socialist Party (1973−2002)
- Spouse: Ágata Gambardella Casanova
- Children: One
- Parent(s): Sergio Cruz Costa; Margot Lorenzen Oehrens
- Education: University of Chile (B.Sc); Instituto de Estudios Superiores de Administración (MD)
- Occupation: Politician
- Profession: Business administrator Economist

Carlos Enrique Cruz Lorenzen (born 13 October 1951) is a Chilean politician and economist who served as minister during Ricardo Lagos' government (2000−2006).

In Chile, he is remembered for the corruption cases under his office as minister, which involved bonuses and privileges for companies in bids.

== Political career ==
=== Beginnings ===
The son of Sergio Cruz Costa, of Italian roots, and Margot Lorenzen Oehrens, of German descent, he completed his primary studies at the Colegio Alemán de Lota and secondary studies at the Colegio Alemán de Santiago. He then studied business administration at the University of Chile.

In his university years, Cruz Lorenzen joined the Revolutionary Left Movement (MIR), which caused a break with his family, shortly after also joining the Socialist Party (PS). Later, he completed a master's degree in administration at the Instituto de Estudios Superiores de Administración in Caracas, Venezuela.

During Augusto Pinochet's dictatorship, he worked mainly as a manager for some companies, including the Estrategia newspaper. He met Ricardo Lagos in 1985, establishing strong bonds of friendship.

=== Ricardo Lagos era ===
With the return to democracy on 11 March 1990, during the government of President Patricio Aylwin, Cruz occupied the position of chief of staff of the Ministry of Economy, Development and Reconstruction (at that time headed by Carlos Ominami). During Ricardo Lagos' ministry in Public Works (MOP) (1994−1998), Cruz hold the position of general coordinator of Concessions, leading the start-up of emblematic infrastructure projects.

On 11 March 2000, Cruz Lorenzen was named by Lagos as Minister of Transportation and Telecommunications. In January 2002, he left the portfolio, being replaced by the industrial engineer Javier Etcheberry.

=== MOP-Gate ===
Shortly after his departure, the Bribery Case broke out, involving officials from his period as a minister in acts of corruption in the delivery of technical licenses. Later, the MOP-Gate Case also broke out, which directly affected him; his arrest was ordered in January 2003. Shortly before that, he had acknowledged having received bonuses as a minister, which caused annoyance in the Lagos Government and its legislative reforms in pursuit of greater probity.

As an effect of the MOP-Gate, on 3 April 2003, Cruz Lorenzen resigned to the PS after 31 years of militancy, in order to 'free the institution from a discussion that I know is uncomfortable for it'.

The investigation carried out by Judge Gloria Ana Chevesich recorded innumerable 'edges' such as MOP-Prograf, MOP-Idecon, MOP-Cycsa, MOP-Délano and MOP-Gesys, among others, which dealt with irregularities ranging from the falsification of the public instrument and pre-agreed tenders to treasury fraud, going through the payment of bonuses and the diversion of public funds, involving dozens of people. For Cruz, the trouble was closed in July 2010 with a three-year sentence remitted and a fine of more than $799 million Chilean pesos of the age, which was ratified in August 2014 by the Santiago Court of Appeals.
