= Germán Correa =

Chilean politician

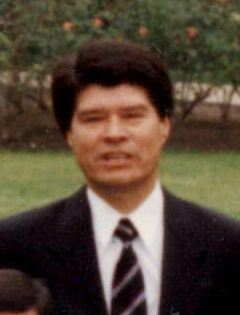

Minister of the Interior
- In office 11 March 1994 – 20 September 1994
- President: Eduardo Frei Ruíz-Tagle
- Preceded by: Enrique Krauss
- Succeeded by: Carlos Figueroa Serrano

Minister of Transport and Telecommunications
- In office 11 March 1990 – 28 September 1992
- President: Patricio Aylwin
- Preceded by: Carlos Silva Echiburú
- Succeeded by: Germán Molina Valdivieso

Personal details
- Born: 26 December 1939 (age 86) Santiago, Chile
- Party: Socialist Party (1962−2020)
- Spouse: Paula Desbordes
- Children: Four
- Parent(s): Victor Correa; Elena Diaz
- Education: University of Chile (B.S); University of California, Berkeley (M.S)
- Occupation: Politician
- Profession: Sociologist

Víctor Germán Correa Díaz (born 26 December 1939) is a Chilean politician and sociologist who served as minister during the christian-democratic presidencies of Patricio Aylwin and Eduardo Frei Ruíz-Tagle.

== Political career ==
=== UP and Pinochet era ===
He worked at the Office of the President of the Republic during the government of Salvador Allende (1970–1973), serving as head of the Planning Department of the National Advisory Council for Social Development.

Between 1974 and 1989, during the Military dictatorship of Chile, he worked in various international organisations linked to the United Nations (UN).

Between 1983 and 1987, he served as national councillor and president of the Popular Democratic Movement (MDP), which sought to remove General Augusto Pinochet from power. In 1985, he was one of the members of the political group Intransigencia Democrática.

=== Concertación governments ===
Following the return to democracy, he served as Minister of Transport and Telecommunications under President Patricio Aylwin.

He later became president of the Socialist Party of Chile and, for a brief period, Minister of the Interior under President Eduardo Frei Ruiz-Tagle, becoming the first Socialist to hold that office since the return to democracy; the previous Socialist interior minister had been Carlos Briones during Allende’s government.

Between 2002 and 2003, he served as general coordinator of the emerging Urban Transport Plan for Santiago, at the request of President Ricardo Lagos.

In 2004, he ran as a candidate for mayor of La Florida, narrowly losing to Pablo Zalaquett of the Independent Democratic Union (UDI).

Between May 2006 and August 2010, he served as chairman of the board of the state-owned Empresa Portuaria de Valparaíso (EPV).

In mid-2014, he was appointed president of the Presidential Advisory Commission on Urban Mobility by President Michelle Bachelet.

On 1 July 2016, he assumed the presidency of the board of the Empresa de los Ferrocarriles del Estado (EFE) for a two-year term.

In January 2020, Germán Correa led a group of nearly 70 militants who resigned from the Socialist Party, after 58 years of membership.

In the 2025 Chilean general election, he ran for the Senate of Chile in the Valparaíso Region as an independent candidate supported by the Social Green Regionalist Federation. He was not elected.
