= Romy Schmidt =

Chilean politician, lawyer and academic (born 1965)

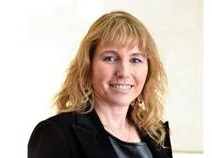

Minister of National Assets
- In office 11 March 2006 – 6 January 2010
- President: Michelle Bachelet
- Preceded by: Sonia Tschorne
- Succeeded by: Jacqueline Weinstein

Personal details
- Born: 18 November 1965 (age 60) Santiago, Chile
- Education: Central University (LL.B)
- Occupation: Lawyer

Romy María Schmidt Crnosija (born 18 November 1965) is a lawyer, academic, researcher and Chilean politician.

She was the Minister of National Assets for President Michelle Bachelet from March 11, 2006, until January 6, 2010. She is a member of the Party for Democracy (PPD), and was married to the sociologist and politician, Antonio Leal (1951–2021).

== Education ==
She completed her secondary education at the Manuel de Salas Institute in Santiago. She subsequently studied law at the Central University of Chile, graduating in 1994 after submitting a thesis entitled Employment Stability.

She later obtained a master's degree in disability studies from the University of Salamanca, Spain, in 1997.

== Political career ==
Between 1998 and 1999, she worked as an external consultant for the International Labour Organization (ILO).

From 1997 to 2005, she was a professor of labour law in the Civil Engineering School of the Central University of Chile and taught disability legislation in the Occupational Therapy School of the Universidad Mayor.

Beginning in 2002, she served as legal counsel to the state-run National Disability Fund (Fonadis), where she was responsible for coordinating the institution's legislative agenda with the National Congress of Chile.

In 2004, she acted as an adviser to the Ministry General Secretariat of Government and to the vice presidency of the National Board of Kindergartens (Junji).

Following her ministerial tenure, she was appointed by President Michelle Bachelet in early 2010 as the inaugural director of the Museum of Memory and Human Rights. In May 2013, she joined Bachelet's presidential campaign as a spokesperson during the latter's successful bid to return to the presidency for a second term.
