= Tomás Pablo Elorza =

Chilean politician (1921–1999)

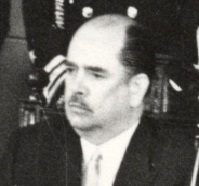

Member of the Senate of Chile
- In office 15 May 1969 – 11 September 1973
- Succeeded by: Dissolution of the charge (1973 Coup d'état)
- Constituency: 7th Provincial Agrupation

President of the Senate
- In office 4 June 1969 – 6 January 1971
- Preceded by: Salvador Allende
- Succeeded by: Patricio Aylwin

President of the Latin American Parliament
- In office 6 December 1972 – 21 September 1973
- Preceded by: Jorge Dáger
- Succeeded by: Arturo Hernández Grisanti

Member of the Chamber of Deputies of Chile
- In office 11 March 1957 – 11 March 1961
- Constituency: 17th Departamental Agrupation

Personal details
- Born: 30 October 1921 Concepción, Chile
- Died: 1 December 1999 (aged 78) Santiago, Chile
- Party: Christian Democratic Party
- Spouse: Ester Roa Rebolledo
- Education: University of Concepción (BA)
- Occupation: Politician
- Profession: Lawyer

Tomás Pablo Elorza (30 October 1921 – 1 December 1999) was a Chilean politician and architect who served as President of the Senate of Chile.

He invested to Salvador Allende with the presidential band when he was elected.

Pablo Elorza was married to Ester Roa Rebolledo, mayor of Concepción (1956−1963) whose name the Estadio Municipal de Concepción was baptized.

A well regarded article that he wrote was «Aylwin, the word of a democrat».
