= Ministry of Transport and Telecommunications (Chile) =

Chilean government ministry

- Ministerio de Transportes y Telecomunicaciones
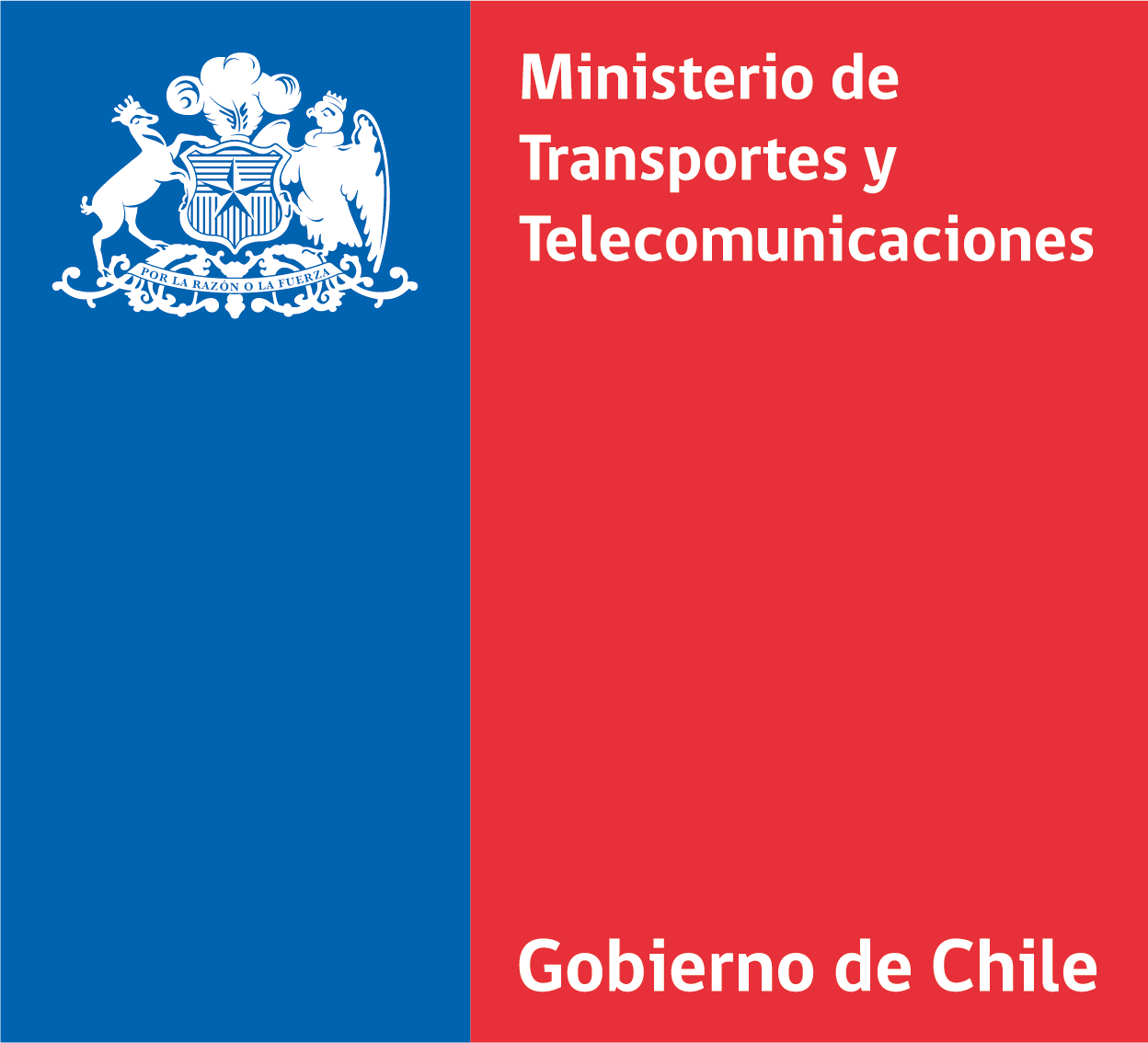

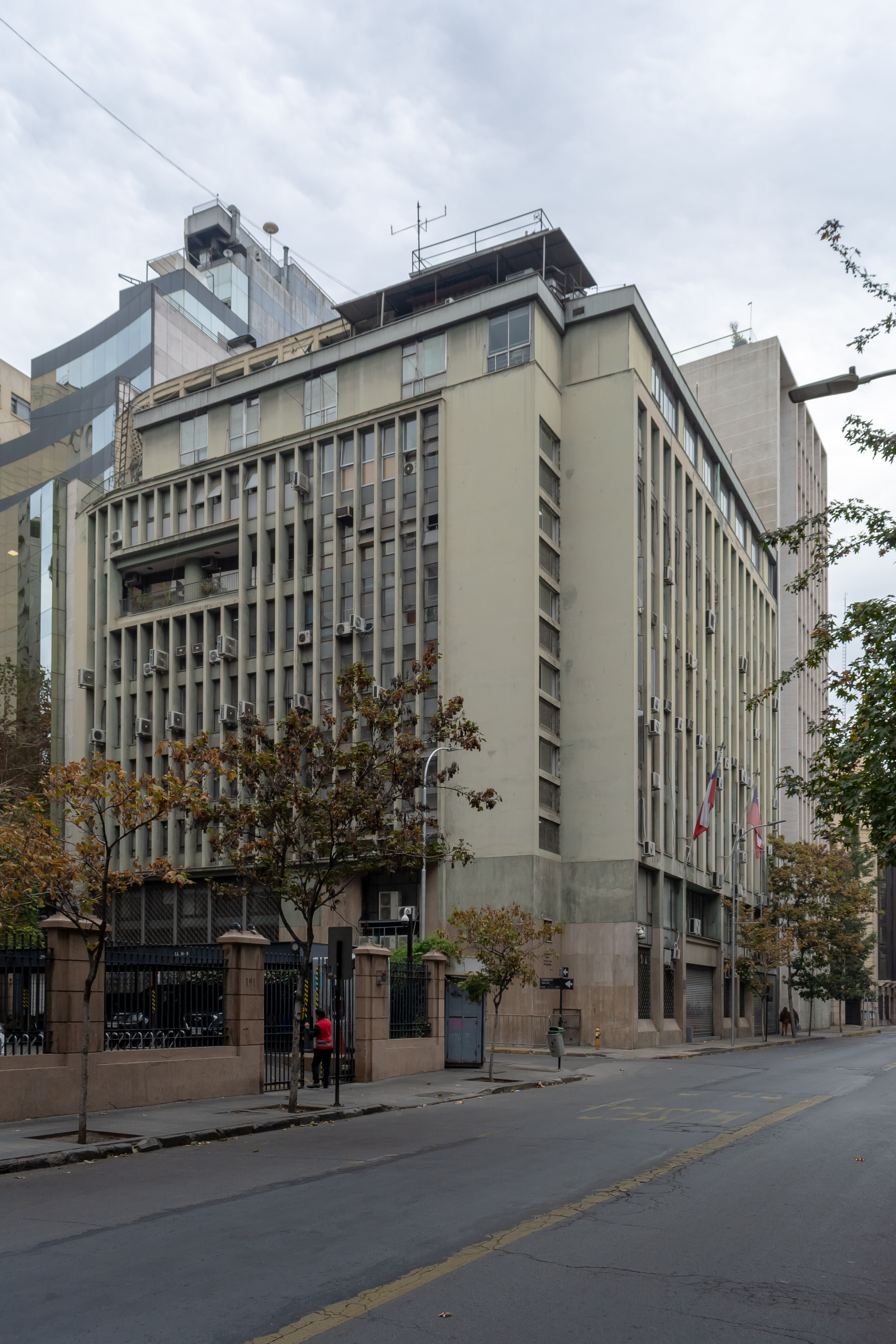
- Headquarters of Ministry of Transport and Telecommunications in Santiago

Agency overview
- Formed: 8 July 1974, as Ministry of Transport) and 20 April 1977, as Ministry of Transport and Telecommunications)
- Preceding agency: Ministry of Transport (1974-1977)
- Type: Ministry
- Jurisdiction: Government of Chile
- Headquarters: Calle Hermanos Amunátegui 139, Santiago
- Employees: 1,113 (2020)
- Annual budget: 1,109,154,952 CLP (2020)
- Agency executives: Louis de Grange, Minister of Transport and Telecommunications; Martín Rueda Mackenna, Undersecretary of Transport; Romina Garrido Iglesias, Undersecretary of Telecommunications
- Website: www.mtt.gob.cl

The Ministry of Transport and Telecommunications (Spanish: Ministerio de Transportes y Telecomunicaciones, better known by its acronym, MTT) is the Chilean ministry responsible for directing, supervising, coordinating, and promoting legislation on transport and telecommunications, as well as coordinating and promoting the development of these activities and ensuring compliance with the relevant laws, regulations, and standards. Its current minister is the civil engineer Juan Carlos Muñoz Abogabir, who has held the position since March 11, 2022, under the government of Gabriel Boric.

It was created during the military dictatorship of General Augusto Pinochet through Decree Law No. 557 of July 8, 1974, thereby separating it from the Ministry of Public Works (Ministerio de Obras Públicas, MOP), which until then had been responsible for transport-related functions.

== Functions ==
The ministry’s main functions are to propose national policies in matters of transport and telecommunications, in accordance with government guidelines, and to exercise direction and oversight of their implementation; to supervise public and private companies operating transport and communications services in the country; and to coordinate and promote the development of these activities, as well as to ensure compliance with the relevant laws, regulations, and standards.

== Structure ==
Its structure consists of two Undersecretariats and four dependent bodies:

- Undersecretariat of Transport (Subsecretaría de Transportes, Subtrans) headed by Jorge Daza Lobos.
- Undersecretariat of Telecommunications (Subsecretaría de Telecomunicaciones, Subtel) headed by Claudio Araya.
- Metropolitan Public Transport Board (Directorio de Transporte Público Metropolitano, DTPM) headed by Paola Tapia.
- Civil Aeronautics Board (Junta Aeronáutica Civil), headed by Martín Mackenna Rueda.
- Executive Secretariat for Digital Development (Secretaría Ejecutiva de Desarrollo Digital)
- National Road Safety Commission (Comisión Nacional de Seguridad de Tránsito, Conaset)

Additionally, the ministry serves as a liaison between the government and autonomous state-owned companies such as the State Railways Company (Empresa de los Ferrocarriles del Estado, EFE), Metro S.A., Correos de Chile (Chile Post), and the ten port companies created through the corporatization of EMPORCHI.

== List of ministers ==
=== Ministers of Transport (1974-1977) ===
- Parties:

– Military

No.	Minister	Party	Start	End	President
1	Enrique Garín Cea	Military	8 July 1974	8 March 1976	Augusto Pinochet Ugarte
2	Raúl Vargas Miquel	Military	8 March 1976	20 April 1977	Augusto Pinochet Ugarte

=== Ministers of Transport and Telecommunications (1977-2026) ===
- Parties:

– Military
– Independent
– Christians Democratic Party (PDC)
– Socialist Party (PS)
– Party for Democracy (PPD)
– Political Evolution (Evópoli)
– Broad Front (FA)

No.	Minister	Party	Start	End	President
1	José Luis Federici	Ind.	20 April 1977	14 December 1979	Augusto Pinochet Ugarte
2	Caupolicán Boisset	Military	14 December 1979	10 August 1983	Augusto Pinochet Ugarte
3	Enrique Escobar Rodríguez	Military	10 August 1983	7 July 1987	Augusto Pinochet Ugarte
4	Jorge Massa Armijo	Military	7 July 1987	21 October 1988	Augusto Pinochet Ugarte
5	Carlos Silva Echiburu	Military	21 October 1988	11 March 1990	Augusto Pinochet Ugarte
6	Germán Correa Díaz	PS	11 March 1990	28 September 1992	Patricio Aylwin Azócar
7	Germán Molina Valdivieso	PPD	28 September 1992	11 March 1994	Patricio Aylwin Azócar
8	Narciso Irureta Aburto	PDC	11 March 1994	28 September 1996	Eduardo Frei Ruiz-Tagle
9	Claudio Hohmann Barrientos	PDC	28 September 1996	11 March 2000	Eduardo Frei Ruiz-Tagle
10	Carlos Cruz Lorenzen	PS	11 March 2000	7 January 2002	Ricardo Lagos Escobar
11	Javier Etcheberry Celhay	PPD	7 January 2002	3 January 2005	Ricardo Lagos Escobar
12	Jaime Estévez Valencia	PS	3 January 2005	11 March 2006	Ricardo Lagos Escobar
13	Sergio Espejo Yaksic	PDC	11 March 2006	27 March 2007	Michelle Bachelet Jeria
14	René Cortázar Sanz	PDC	27 March 2007	11 March 2010	Michelle Bachelet Jeria
15	Felipe Morandé Lavín	Ind.	11 March 2010	14 January 2011	Sebastián Piñera Echenique
16	Pedro Pablo Errázuriz Domínguez	Ind.	16 January 2011	11 March 2014	Sebastián Piñera Echenique
17	Andrés Gómez-Lobo Echeñique	PPD	11 March 2014	14 March 2017	Michelle Bachelet Jeria
18	Paola Tapia Salas	Ind.	14 March 2017	11 March 2018	Michelle Bachelet Jeria
19	Gloria Hutt Hesse	Evópoli	11 March 2018	11 March 2022	Sebastián Piñera Echenique
20	Juan Carlos Muñoz Abogabir	Ind.	11 March 2022	11 March 2026	Gabriel Boric Font
21	Louis de Grange Concha	Ind.	11 March 2026	Incumbent	José Antonio Kast Rist
