= Jaime Estévez =

Chilean politician

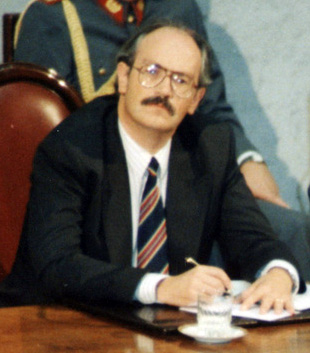

President of Cruzados SADP
- In office 2010–2014
- Preceded by: Jorge O'Ryan
- Succeeded by: Luis Larraín Arroyo

President of the Chamber of Deputies
- In office 14 March 1995 – 19 November 1996
- President: Eduardo Frei Ruíz-Tagle
- Preceded by: Vicente Sota
- Succeeded by: Gutenberg Martínez

Member of the Chamber of Deputies
- In office 11 March 1990 – 11 March 1998
- Preceded by: District created
- Succeeded by: Isabel Allende Bussi
- Constituency: 29th District (Puente Alto, La Pintana, Pirque and San José de Maipo)

Ministry of Public Works
- In office 3 January 2005 – 11 March 2006
- President: Ricardo Lagos
- Preceded by: Javier Etcheverry
- Succeeded by: Eduardo Bitrán

Ministry of Transport and Telecommunications
- In office 3 January 2005 – 11 March 2006
- President: Ricardo Lagos
- Preceded by: Javier Etcheverry
- Succeeded by: Sergio Espejo

Personal details
- Born: 27 September 1946 (age 79) Santiago, Chile
- Party: Christian Democratic Party (1964−1970); Popular Unitary Action Movement (1970−1973); Party for Democracy (1987−1990); Socialist Party (1991−present)
- Spouse(s): Jacqueline Weinstein (divorced); Bernardita Aguirre (1994−present)
- Children: Five
- Education: St. Ignatius College, Santiago
- Alma mater: University of Chile
- Occupation: Politician
- Profession: Economist

Jaime Luis Estévez Valencia (born 27 September 1946) is a Chilean politician who served as President of the Chamber of Deputies, ministry of State and president of the football branch of the Club Deportivo Universidad Católica (Católica), institution linked with the same university.

In 2011, he became an investor of Católica.

== Biography ==
He was born on 27 September 1946 in Santiago, Chile.

He married Bernarda Aguirre, with whom he has five children.

=== Professional career ===
He completed his primary education at Colegio Seminario de Chillán and his secondary studies at Colegio San Ignacio in Santiago. He later entered the Faculty of Economic and Administrative Sciences of the University of Chile, where he graduated as a commercial engineer.

Between 1970 and 1973 he worked as an advisor to FEDHACH and as an executive at CODELCO. He also served as Professor of Economics at the University of Chile and at the Pontifical Catholic University of Chile.

After the 1973 military coup, he went into exile, settling in Italy, where he carried out teaching duties at the University of Rome. He later moved to Mexico, where he worked as research coordinator at the Centro del Tercer Mundo.

He returned to Chile in 1983 and worked as an economist at FLACSO's Research Center, at the Corporation for Latin American Studies (CIEPLAN), and at the Latin American Center for International Economy and Politics (CLEPI).

Among other activities, he was a member of the board of Provida when the pension fund administrator (AFP) belonged to the Saieh group. In 2006 he served as director of ENDESA. He was also president of Cruzados SADP, the entity that manages Club Deportivo Universidad Católica.

== Political career ==
During the 1980s he joined the Central Committee of the Socialist Party. He was one of the founders of the Party for Democracy (PPD), member of its political commission and metropolitan president. He resigned from the party on 27 May 1991 and later rejoined the Socialist Party of Chile.

On 11 March 2000 he was appointed president of Banco del Estado (BancoEstado), where he led a restructuring and modernization process. He held this position until 2004, when President Ricardo Lagos appointed him Minister of Public Works, and later bi-minister of Public Works and Transport and Telecommunications. He served in these posts until 2006.
