= Javier Etcheberry =

Chilean politician

Javier Etcheverry

Minister of Public Works
- In office 7 January 2002 – 7 January 2005
- President: Ricardo Lagos
- Preceded by: Carlos Cruz Lorenzen
- Succeeded by: Jaime Estévez

Personal details
- Born: 14 January 1947 (age 79) Santiago, Chile
- Party: Party for Democracy
- Spouse(s): Isabel Araos (divorced); Cecilia Sommerhoff Hyde
- Children: Three
- Relatives: Pablo, Felipe and Tomás Kast (stepsons)
- Education: University of Chile (LL.B); University of Michigan (PhD)
- Profession: Lawyer

Javier Etcheberry Celhay (born 14 March 1947) is a Chilean politician who served as minister.

== Political career ==
A member of the Party for Democracy (PPD), he was appointed Director of the Internal Revenue Service (SII) at the beginning of President Patricio Aylwin's administration, on the recommendation of Christian Democratic economist José Pablo Arellano. As head of the SII, he promoted the modernization of Chile's tax payment system through Internet-based filing and reduced the rate of tax evasion to below 30%.

He remained Director until 2002, when President Ricardo Lagos appointed him Minister of Public Works, then officially Minister of Public Works, Transport and Telecommunications. In that capacity, he played a leading role in the conception of the Transantiago public transport plan.

At the outset of his tenure, he had to address the Caso Coimas and Gate scandals, both of which directly involved agencies under his ministry. Shortly thereafter, his predecessor, Carlos Cruz, disclosed the existence of supplementary salary payments to public officials, further complicating the ministry's situation. Although a number of major public works projects progressed during his tenure and were inaugurated near the end of the Lagos administration, his period in office is chiefly associated with efforts to reorganize the Ministry of Public Works and address administrative irregularities.

On 18 November 2004, the Loncomilla Bridge in the Maule Region collapsed. Although the collapse caused no fatalities, it prompted widespread criticism from both the opposition and members of the government after deficiencies in the ministry's oversight of the companies responsible for constructing and later repairing the bridge were identified. Following the incident, Etcheberry resigned as minister and was succeeded by Jaime Estévez at the request of President Ricardo Lagos.

He then became chairman of BancoEstado, effectively exchanging positions with Jaime Estévez, and remained in that role until March 2006.

In December 2006, shortly after the expulsion of Jorge Schaulsohn, he resigned from the PPD.

He subsequently focused on business activities. In 2007, he was one of the founders of the financial services company Multicaja S.A.. In 2019, he sold a stake in the company to Krealo, a subsidiary of the Credicorp group, while remaining its Executive Chairman.
