= Carlos Hurtado Ruiz-Tagle =

Chilean politician

Carlos Hurtado Ruíz-Tagle

Minister of Public Works
- In office 11 March 1990 – 11 March 1994
- President: Patricio Aylwin
- Preceded by: Hernán Abad Cid
- Succeeded by: Ricardo Lagos

Personal details
- Born: 17 February 1937 (age 89) Santiago, Chile
- Party: National Party (1970−1973); Intdependent (1990−)
- Spouse: Leonor Larraín
- Education: University of Chile; Harvard University (Ph.D.)
- Occupation: Politician
- Profession: Economist

Carlos Hurtado Ruíz-Tagle (born 17 February 1937) is a Chilean politician who served as minister of State under Patricio Aylwin's government of the early 1990s. Previously, in 1970, he was a coordinator of Jorge Alessandri's failed campaign for the presidency in the presidential elections of that year.

In 2009, he replaced Sebastián Piñera as president of Chilevisión when Pinñera stepped down to run for president.

== Early life ==
He is the brother-in-law of former minister of State and senator Andrés Zaldívar —through his sister Inés— and a nephew of Saint Alberto Hurtado. He is the brother of former deputy and appointed mayor of Palmilla, José María Hurtado.

He is a business administrator from the University of Chile and holds a Ph.D. in economics from Harvard University.

== Public life ==
He has worked as a consultant for various organizations, including the World Bank and the Inter-American Development Bank.

Between 1957 and 1971, he served as an assistant and later as a researcher in the Research Program of the Institute of Economics at the University of Chile. He carried out work in the areas of transport demand and costs, railway policies and port operations, as well as studies in economic history.

Between 1967 and 1968, he was a consultant to the Confederation of Production and Commerce (CPC), and between 1969 and 1970 he participated as a coordinator in the working group that drafted the government program of candidate and former president Jorge Alessandri Rodríguez.

In 1971, he assumed the position of technical director of a group of consultants that worked on the formulation of the federal highway master plan of Brazil, a role he held until 1974. From that year until 1990, he was a partner and president of Inecon, a Chilean consulting company that participated in the development of projects in infrastructure, industry, and finance.

He served as Minister of Public Works of Chile between 1990 and 1994. Among his main achievements were the formulation and implementation of the public works concessions system in Chile, as well as the initiation of the privatization process of water and sanitation companies. Both initiatives, which required the approval of the National Congress of Chile, enabled the inflow of billions of dollars into the country, making it possible, on the one hand, to modernize infrastructure and, on the other, to support the growth of the economy.

Afterwards, he served for one year as executive director of Televisión Nacional de Chile.

He has served as president of companies such as Entel, Molymet, and Chilevisión. He currently serves as first vice president of the Society for Industrial Development (Sofofa).

He considers himself politically independent. This led him to support the center-right businessman Sebastián Piñera in the 2005 presidential election instead of the Concertación candidate, Michelle Bachelet.
