= Patricio Aylwin =

President of Chile from 1990 to 1994

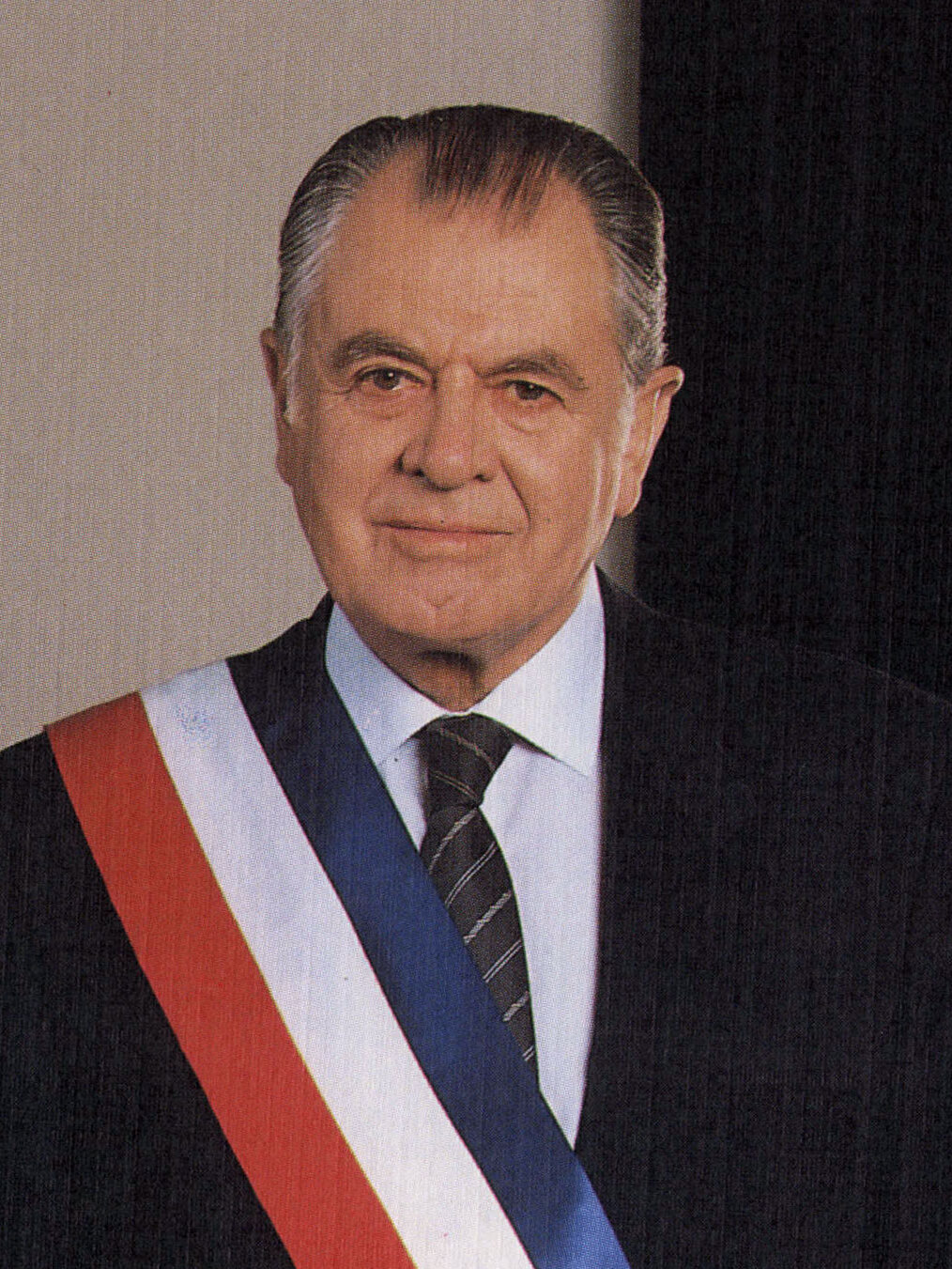
- Official portrait, 1990

31st President of Chile
- In office 11 March 1990 – 11 March 1994
- Preceded by: Augusto Pinochet Ugarte
- Succeeded by: Eduardo Frei Ruiz-Tagle

President of the Senate of Chile
- In office 12 January 1971 – 22 May 1972
- Preceded by: Tomás Pablo Elorza
- Succeeded by: José Ignacio Palma

Senator of the Republic of Chile for the Sixth Provincial Grouping (Curicó, Talca, Linares and Maule)
- In office 15 May 1965 – 11 September 1973

Personal details
- Born: Patricio Aylwin Azócar; 26 November 1918 Viña del Mar, Chile
- Died: 19 April 2016 (aged 97) Santiago, Chile
- Resting place: Cementerio General de Santiago, Santiago
- Party: Christian Democratic Party
- Spouse: Leonor Oyarzún Ivanovic (m. 1948)
- Children: 5, including Mariana
- Education: University of Chile
- Occupation: Lawyer

Patricio Aylwin Azócar OMCh (Latin American Spanish pronunciation: [paˈtɾisjo ˈelwin aˈsokaɾ]; 26 November 1918 – 19 April 2016) was a Chilean politician, lawyer, author, professor and former senator who was the 30th president of Chile from 1990 to 1994. He was the first president to be elected after the end of Augusto Pinochet's military dictatorship following the 1988 Chilean presidential referendum, marking the Chilean transition to democracy in 1990. He was from the Christian Democratic Party.

Born in Viña del Mar, to British descent on his father's side, Aylwin was an active politician since 1945. He was first elected Senator in 1965, and later became president of the Senate in 1971 under Salvador Allende's administration. After the 1973 coup, he led the Christian Democratic Party on two occasions, and was elected president in 1989. His administration was defined by social and economic reforms, the latter of which led to a significant decrease in Chile's homeless population. Aylwin was also a staunch supporter of the Chilean National Commission for Truth and Reconciliation, which sought to prosecute those involved in human rights violations during the dictatorship.

== Early life ==
Aylwin, the eldest of the five children of Miguel Aylwin and Laura Azócar, was born in Viña del Mar. An excellent student, he enrolled in the Law School of the University of Chile where he became a lawyer, with the highest distinction, in 1943. He served as professor of administrative law, first at the University of Chile (1946–1967) and later at the School of Law of the Pontifical Catholic University of Chile (1952–1960). He was also professor of civic education and political economy at the National Institute (1946–1963). His brother, Andrés, was also a politician.

On 29 September 1948, he married Leonor Oyarzún Ivanovic. They had five children (his daughter Mariana worked as a minister in subsequent governments) and 14 grandchildren (among them, telenovela and film actress Paz Bascuñán).

== Political career ==
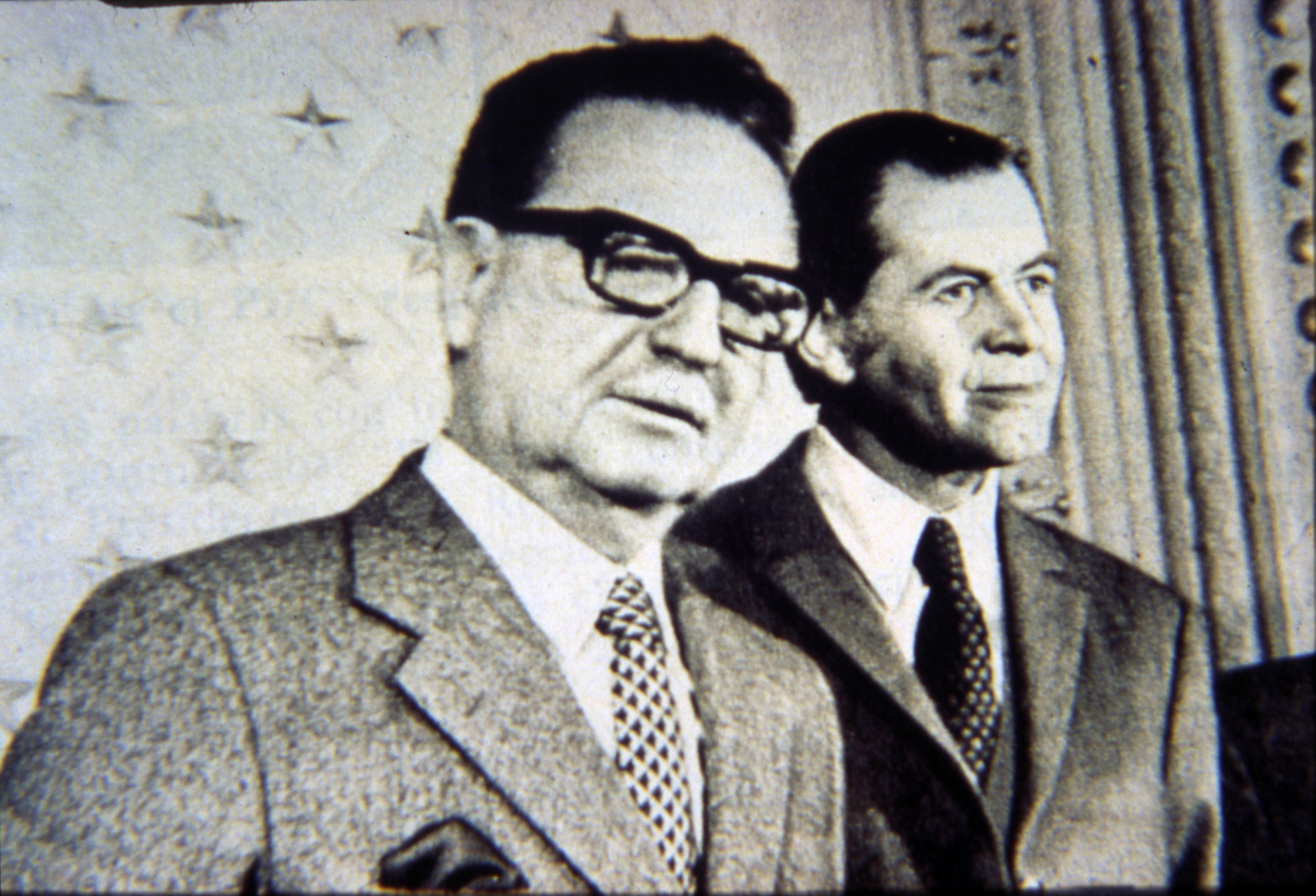
President Salvador Allende with then-senator Aylwin

Aylwin's involvement in politics started in 1945, when he joined the Falange Nacional. Later he was elected president of the Falange in 1950–51. When that party became the Christian Democratic Party of Chile, he served seven terms as its president between 1958 and 1989.

In 1965 he was elected to the National Congress as a Senator. In 1971, he became the president of the Senate. During the government of Popular Unity, headed by Salvador Allende, he was also the president of his party, and he led the democratic opposition to Allende within and without Congress. He is credited, to some degree, with trying to find a peaceful solution to the country's political crisis. Distrusting Allende, Aylwin "demanded that the president appoint only military men to his cabinet as proof of his honest intent," which Allende did only partially, and Aylwin "apparently sided with pro-coup forces, believing that the military would restore democracy to the nation." He stated very plainly that between "a Marxist dictatorship and a dictatorship of our military, I would choose the second."

Aylwin was president of the Christian Democrats until 1976, and after the death of the party's leader, Eduardo Frei, in 1982, he led his party during the military dictatorship of Augusto Pinochet. Later he helped establish the Constitutional Studies Group of 24 to reunite the country's democratic sectors against the dictatorship. In 1979 he served as a spokesman in the group that opposed the plebiscite that approved a new constitution.

In 1982, Aylwin was elected vice president of the Christian Democrats. He was among the first to advocate acceptance of the Constitution as a reality in order to facilitate the return to democracy.

On 5 October 1988, the Chilean national plebiscite was held. A "Yes" vote would grant Pinochet eight more years as president. Despite the widespread expectation that Pinochet would be voted an extended term, the "No" campaign triumphed, in part because of a superb media campaign depicted in the 2012 film No. Aylwin was at the center of the movement that defeated Pinochet. After the plebiscite, he participated in negotiations that led the government and the opposition to agree on 54 constitutional reforms, thereby making possible a peaceful transition from 16 years of dictatorship to democracy.

== Presidency ==
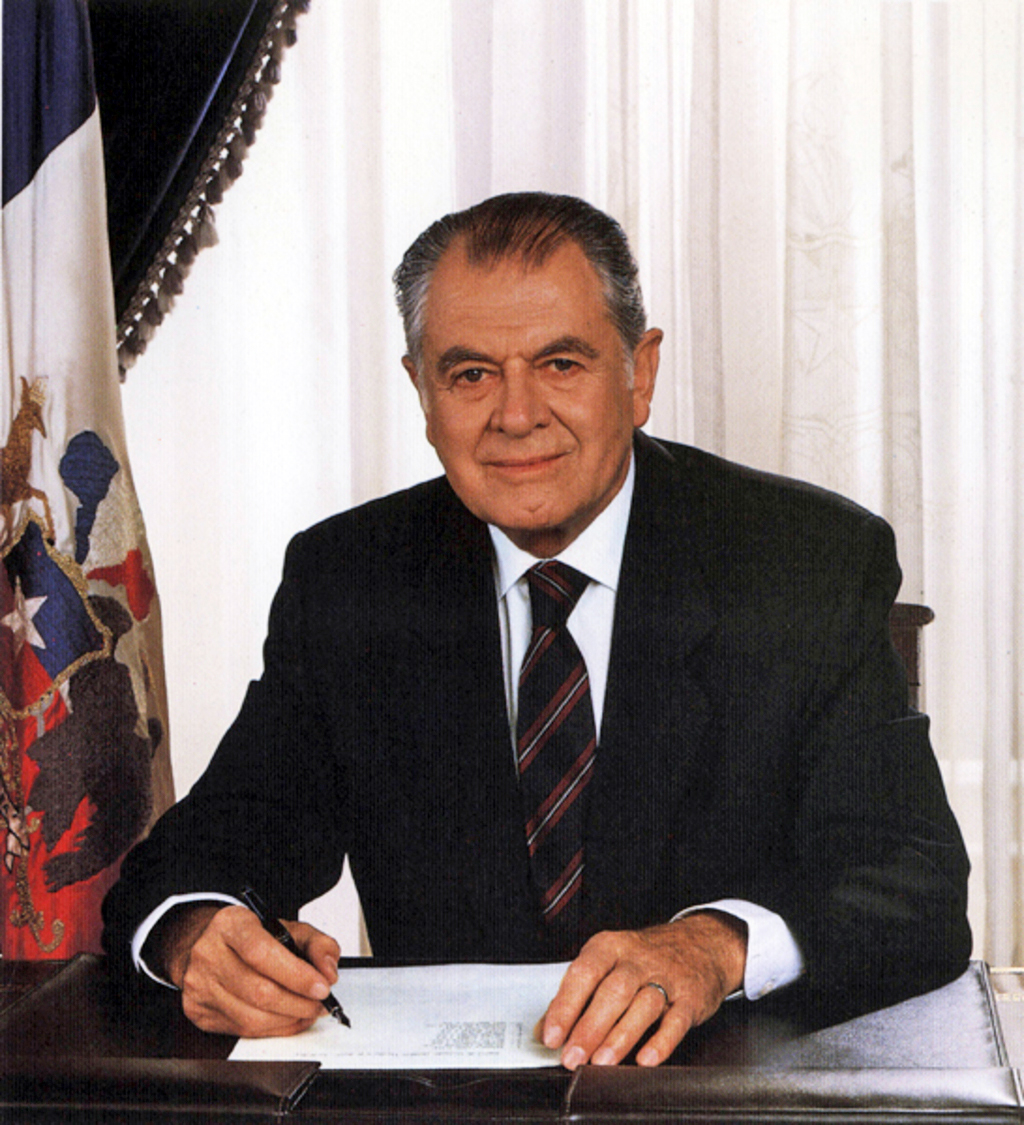
Aylwin in his office, 1990

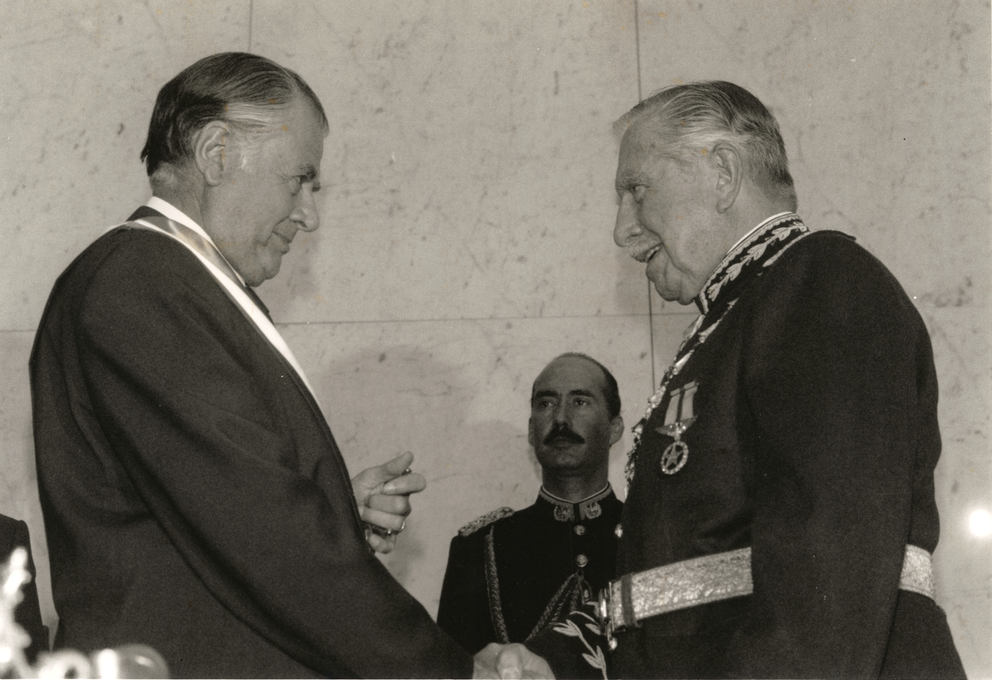
Pinochet congratulates Aylwin on inauguration day, 11 March 1990.

The Aylwin Cabinet
Office	Name	Party	Term
President	Patricio Aylwin	DC	11 March 1990–11 March 1994
Interior	Enrique Krauss	PS	11 March 1990–11 March 1994
Foreign Affairs	Enrique Silva Cimma	PR	11 March 1990–11 March 1994
Defense	Patricio Rojas	DC	11 March 1990–11 March 1994
Finance	Alejandro Foxley	DC	11 March 1990–11 March 1994
Gen. Sec. of the Presidency	Edgardo Boeninger	DC	11 March 1990–11 March 1994
Gen. Sec. of Government	Enrique Correa	PS	11 March 1990–11 March 1994
Economy, Development & Tourism	Carlos Ominami	PS	11 March 1990–28 September 1992
Jorge Marshall	PPD	28 September 1992–16 December 1993
Jaime Tohá	PS	16 December 1993–11 March 1994
Social Development & Family	Sergio Molina Silva	DC	11 March 1990–11 March 1994
Education	Ricardo Lagos	PPD	11 March 1990–28 September 1992
Jorge Arrate	PS	20 September 1992–11 March 1994
Justice & Human; Rights	Francisco Cumplido	DC	11 March 1990–11 March 1994
Labor & Social Welfare	René Cortázar	DC	11 March 1990–11 March 1994
Public Works	Carlos Hurtado Ruíz-Tagle	Ind.	11 March 1990–11 March 1994
Health	Jorge Jiménez	DC	11 March 1990–30 October 1992
Julio Montt	DC	30 October 1992–11 March 1994
Housing & Urbanism	Alberto Etchegaray Aubry	Ind.	11 March 1990–11 March 1994
Agriculture	Juan Agustín Figueroa	PR	11 March 1990–11 March 1994
Mining	Juan Hamilton Depassier	DC	11 March 1990–28 September 1992
Alejandro Hales	DC	28 September 1992–11 March 1994
Transport & Telecommunications	Germán Correa	PS	11 March 1990–28 September 1992
Germán Molina Valdivieso	PPD	28 September 1992–11 March 1994
National Assets	Luis Alvarado Constenla	PPD	11 March 1990–11 March 1994
Environment	Jaime Tohá	PS	11 March 1990–11 March 1994
Women & Gender; Equality	Soledad Alvear	DC	11 March 1990–11 March 1994

=== Domestic policy ===
Patricio Aylwin was elected president of Chile on 14 December 1989.

Although Chile had officially become a democracy, the Chilean military led by Pinochet remained highly powerful during the presidency of Aylwin, and the Constitution ensured the continued influence of Pinochet and his commanders, which prevented his government from achieving many of the goals it had set, such as the restructuring of the Constitutional Court and the reduction of Pinochet's political power. His administration, however, initiated direct municipal elections, the first of which were held in June 1992. In spite of the severe limits imposed on Aylwin's government by the Constitution, over four years, it "altered power relations in its favor in the state, in civil society, and in political society". Pinochet was determined that the military not be punished for its role in overthrowing Allende's government or for the years of military dictatorship. Aylwin did attempt to bring to justice those in the military who committed abuses.

=== Economic policy ===
The Aylwin Government did much to reduce poverty and inequality during its time in office. A tax reform was introduced in 1990 which boosted tax revenues by around 15% and enabled the Aylwin Government to increase government spending on social programs from 9.9% to 11.7% of GDP. By the end of the Aylwin government, unprecedented resources were being allocated to social programs, including an expanded public health programs, vocational and training programs for young Chileans, and a major public housing initiative.

A new Solidarity and Social Investment Fund was set up to direct aid towards poorer communities, and social spending (especially on health and education) increased by around one-third between 1989 and 1993. A new labor law was also enacted in 1990, which expanded trade union rights and collective bargaining while also improving severance pay for workers. The minimum wage was also increased, as were family allowances, pensions, and other benefits. Between 1990 and 1993, real wages grew by 4.6%, while the unemployment rate fell from 7.8% to 6.5%. Spending on education increased by 40% while spending on health increased by 54%. The incomes of poor Chileans increased by 20% in real terms (above the rate of inflation) under the Aylwin Government, while increases to the minimum wage meant that it was 36% higher in real terms in 1993 than in 1990. A slum clearance program was also initiated, with over 100,000 new homes built under the Aylwin Government, compared with 40,000 per annum under the Pinochet Government.

Under the Aylwin government, the numbers of Chileans living in poverty significantly decreased, with a United Nations report estimating that the percentage of the population living in poverty had fallen from around 40% of the population in 1989 to around 33% by 1993.

=== End ===
He was succeeded in 1994 by the election of Christian Democrat Eduardo Frei Ruiz-Tagle, the son of the late President Eduardo Frei Montalva.

== Personal life ==
Aylwin was of British descent through his paternal lineage. The British Foreign and Commonwealth Office (FCO) commissioned Timothy Duke to research into Aylwin's heritage prior to a state visit in April 1991. They found that his great-grandfather, Richard Aylwin (who later changed his name to Ricardo Aylwin), was an Englishman born in Southwark, England, to tallow chandlers and emigrated to Chile in 1833. Aylwin had spent most of his life thinking he was of Welsh descent and had initially planned a trip to Cardiff as part of the official United Kingdom visit following his presidential election.

The FCO had also found that further down his lineage, his ancestors were yeoman farmers in Sussex, where Aylwin is quite a common surname. Duke described Aylwin's British ancestry as "well established" and accompanied him during his state visit to the villages of Treyford and Didling in Sussex, where Aylwin visited the graves of his ancestors and met relatives. Duke stated that Aylwin “didn’t speak English so we had an interpreter, but he was delighted with the reception he got in Sussex,” and that “He just seemed delighted to be back in a county from which his forebears had come and to discover the truth.”

Aylwin was a descendant of Henry fitz Ailwin, the first Lord Mayor of London.

== Post-presidency ==
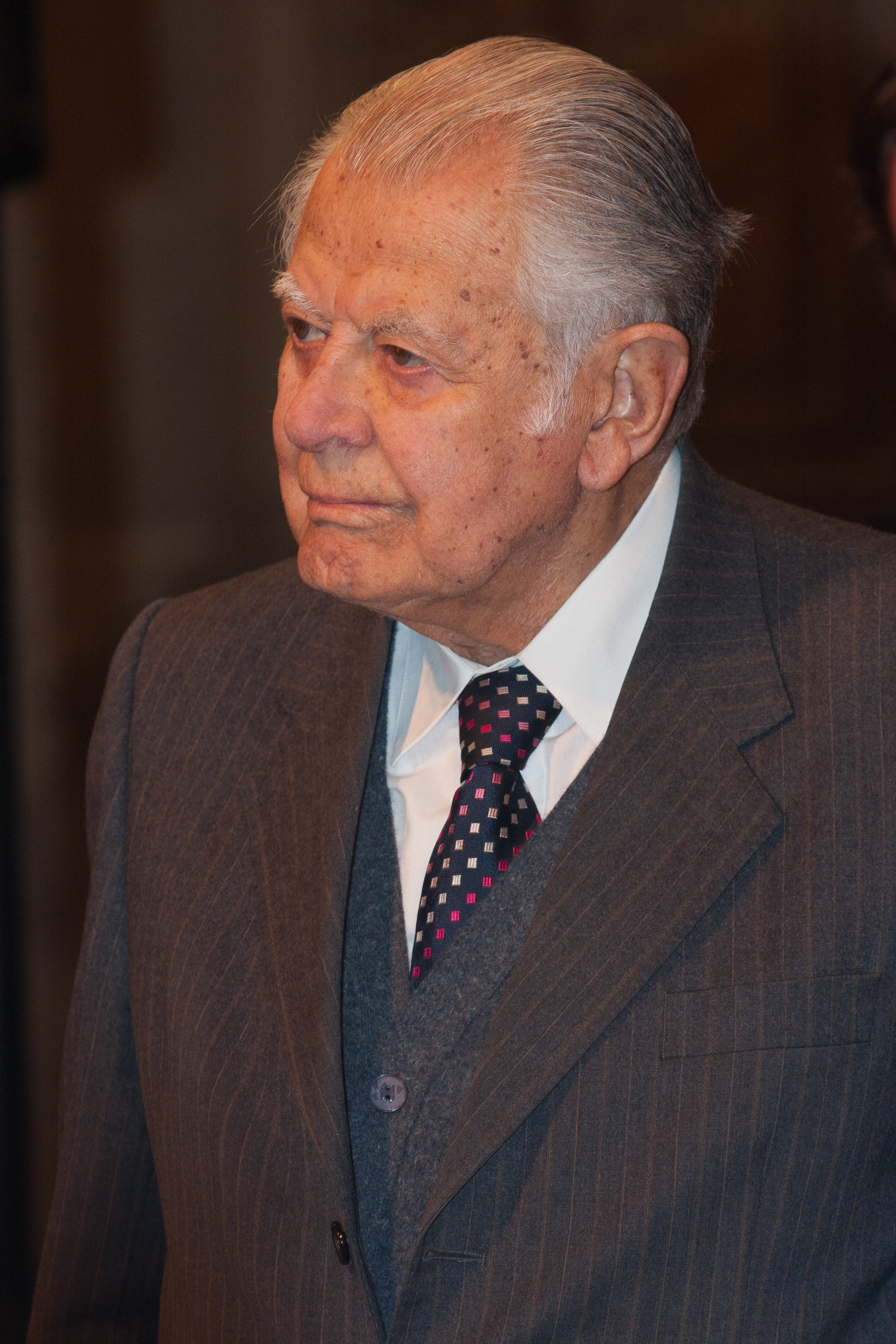
Aylwin in July 2011

Aylwin was president of the Corporation for Democracy and Justice, a non-profit organization he founded to develop approaches to eliminating poverty and to strengthen ethical values in politics.

Aylwin received honorary degrees from universities in Australia, Canada, Colombia, France, Italy, Japan, Portugal, Spain, and the United States, as well as seven Chilean universities. In 1997, the Council of Europe awarded the North-South Prize to Aylwin and Mary Robinson, former president of Ireland, for their contributions to fostering human rights, democracy, and cooperation between Europe and Latin America.

== Death ==
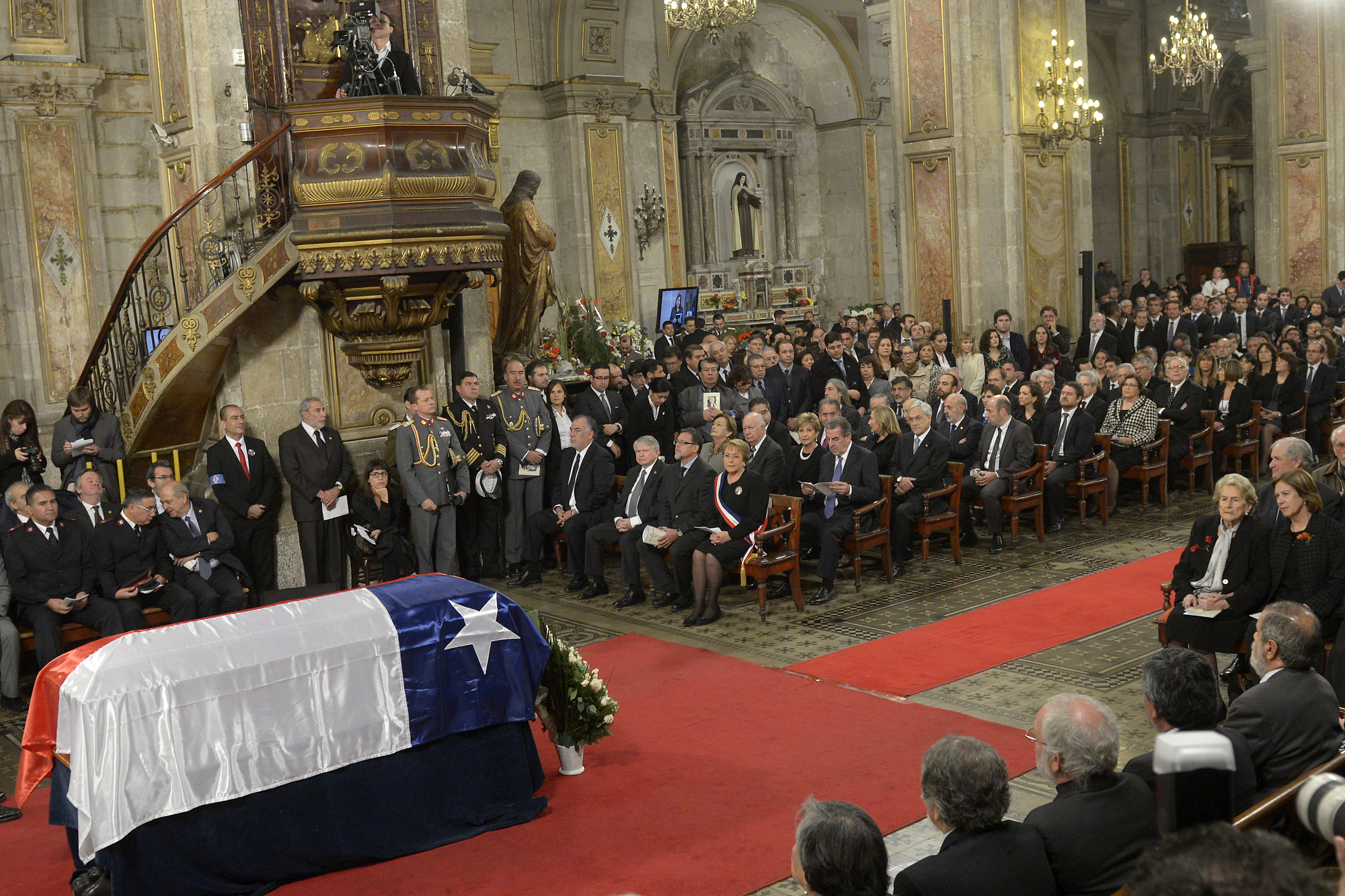
The funeral cortege of Patricio Aylwin on 22 April 2016 in Santiago

On 18 December 2015, Aylwin was hospitalized in Santiago after suffering a cranial injury at home. He died on 19 April 2016, aged 97, from natural causes from respiratory insufficiency.

His state funeral was held on 22 April 2016 and he was buried at the Santiago General Cemetery in the following days.

== Honours and awards ==
=== Awards ===
- Council of Europe: North–South Prize (1997)
- Fulbright Association: William Fulbright Prize for International Understanding (1988)

=== Foreign honours ===
- Peru: Grand Cross with Diamonds of the Order of the Sun of Peru (1990)
- Mexico: Collar of the Order of the Aztec Eagle (1990)
- Sovereign Military Order of Malta: Order pro Merito Melitensi (1990)
- Jamaica: Member of the Order of Jamaica
- Spain: Knight of the Collar of the Order of Isabella the Catholic (1990)
- Spain: Collar of the Order of Charles III (1991)
- Italy: Knight Grand Cross with Collar of the Order of Merit of the Italian Republic (1991)
- Malaysia: Honorary Recipient of the Order of the Crown of the Realm (1991)
- Portugal: Grand Collar of the Order of Liberty (26 August 1992)
- Austria: Grand Star of the Decoration of Honour for Services to the Republic of Austria (1993)

Political offices
Preceded by Tomás Pablo Elorza	President of the Senate of Chile; 1971–1972	Succeeded by José Ignacio Palma
Preceded by Augusto Pinochet	President of Chile; 1990–1994	Succeeded by Eduardo Frei Ruiz-Tagle
Party political offices
Preceded by Tomás Reyes Vicuña	President of Falange Nacional; 1951–1952	Succeeded by Tomás Reyes Vicuña
Preceded by Narciso Irureta	President of the Christian Democratic Party; 1973–1976	Succeeded by Andrés Zaldívar
Preceded by Gabriel Valdés	President of the Christian Democratic Party; 1989–1991	Succeeded by Andrés Zaldívar
Preceded by Radomiro Tomic	Christian Democratic nominee for President of Chile; 1989	Succeeded by Eduardo Frei Ruiz-Tagle
New political alliance	Concertación nominee for President of Chile; 1989	Succeeded by Eduardo Frei Ruiz-Tagle
