= Sergio Espejo =

Chilean politician

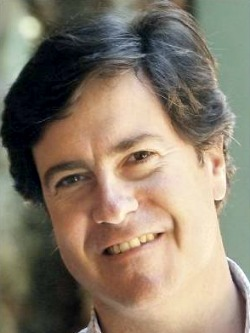

Member of the Chamber of Deputies
- In office 11 March 2014 – 11 March 2018
- Preceded by: Juan Carlos Latorre
- Succeeded by: Dissolution of the District

Minister of Transport & Telecommunications
- In office 11 March 2006 – 27 March 2007
- Preceded by: Jaime Estévez
- Succeeded by: René Cortázar

Personal details
- Born: 15 March 1967 (age 59) Santiago, Chile
- Party: Christian Democracy (−2017)
- Children: Five
- Parent(s): Magdalena Yaksic Triantafilo; Gilberto Espejo
- Education: University of Chile (LL.B); Johns Hopkins University (PhD)
- Occupation: Politician
- Profession: Lawyer

Sergio Espejo Yaksic (born 15 March 1967) is a Chilean politician and lawyer.

== Early life and education ==
Sergio Espejo was born in Santiago, Chile, on 15 March 1967, the son of Gilberto Espejo Espejo, a former official of the Chamber of Deputies, and Magdalena Yaksic Triantafilo. He completed his secondary education at Colegio San Ignacio de El Bosque and studied law at the University of Chile, obtaining his law degree in December 1996. He later earned a Master in Public Policy from the John F. Kennedy School of Government at Harvard University.

== Professional and academic career ==
Since 2008, Espejo has been a co-founder and partner of the law firm Espejo, González Abogados Asociados and has carried out pro bono legal work through the Corporación Interés Público. He has pursued an academic career as a lecturer in public policy, infrastructure regulation and regulated industries at institutions including the University of Chile, Universidad Adolfo Ibáñez and Universidad Diego Portales.

In the private and non-profit sectors, he has served as general manager of Inmobiliaria Las Lilas, senior consultant at Vital Comunicaciones, and a board member of Fundación COANIL.

== Public service and political career ==
During his student years, Espejo was active in student leadership, serving as president of the Law Students’ Association of the University of Chile between 1990 and 1991. He later worked as a legislative advisor and held senior advisory roles in the Ministries of Finance, Health, Education and Economy.

Between January 2001 and May 2005, he served as Superintendent of Electricity and Fuels (SEC) and participated in several competitions and standards-setting bodies in Chile. From March 2006 to March 2007, he was Minister of Transport and Telecommunications under President Michelle Bachelet, during which he coordinated the implementation of the Transantiago public transport system.

He was elected Deputy for District No. 35 in the O’Higgins Region and served in the Chamber of Deputies from 2014 to 2018. A long-time member of the Christian Democratic Party, he resigned from the party in August 2017, citing big political and ideological differences with its leadership.

== Marine Stewardship Council ==
In May 2023, the Marine Stewardship Council announced Espejo’s appointment to its board of directors, making him the first and only Latin American member of the organisation’s governing body. The appointment was framed as recognition of Chile’s advances in fisheries sustainability and as part of MSC’s objective to strengthen representation from the Global South. His term formally began in July 2023.

== Personal life ==
Espejo was married to Carolina Gana Ahumada and is the father of five children.
