= José Pablo Arellano =

Chilean politician

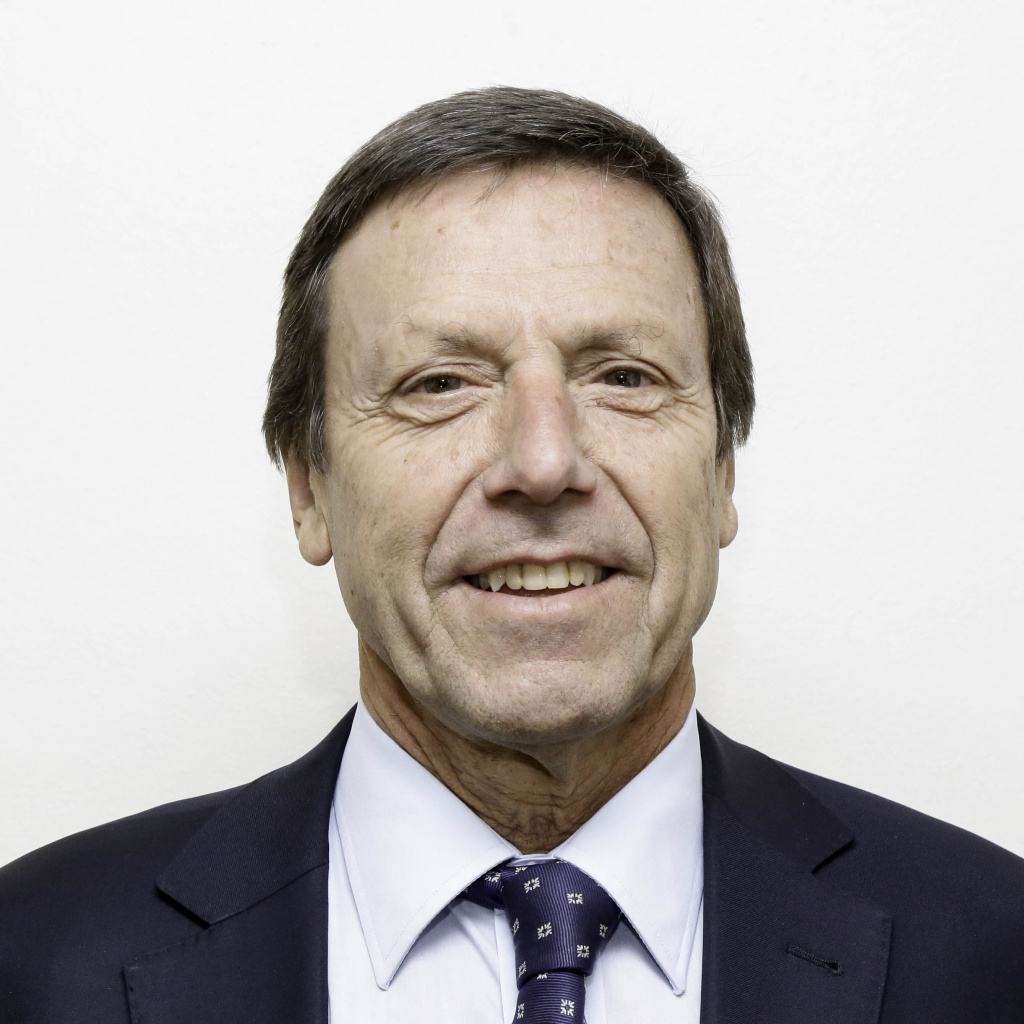
- Born: March 18, 1952 (age 73); Santiago, Chile
- Occupations: economist, academic, researcher, company director, consultant, politician
- Known for: Minister of Education

José Pablo Arellano Marin (Santiago, March 18, 1952) is an economist, academic, researcher, company director, consultant and Chilean politician, current member of Amarillos por Chile. He was Minister of Education under the governments of Eduardo Frei Ruiz-Tagle and of Michelle Bachelet, chief executive officer of Codelco-Chile, a state-owned company and also the largest company in the country. His father was José Arellano, a Falangist former mayor of Cartagena and former president of the Association of Municipalities of the time. He died when Arellano was just four years old. He has been married since 1975 to the preschool teacher and landscape designer María Elena (Manena) Recabarren, and they have four children, José Pablo, Magdalena, Andrés and Francisca.

== Education ==
Arellano studied at Colegio San Ignacio in the Chilean capital, Santiago. After graduating with a degree in economics from the Pontifical Catholic University of Chile as the best student in his class, he received a master's degree in economics from Harvard University and then a doctorate in 1979. After having worked as a researcher at the Corporation of Studies for Latin America, CIEPLAN, Arellano was executive director of the organization from 1984 to 1989, hence his proximity to economists like Alejandro Foxley, Ricardo Ffrench-Davis, Pablo Piñera and René Cortázar. He has sat on the boards of several nonprofit educational corporations, including the Fundación Belén Educa, the Maipú Educational Corporation and the Peñalolén Municipal Corporation. He is currently a director of Hogar de Cristo, Fundación Opportunidad and Belén Educa. He has been a professor at the Pontifical Catholic University of Chile, the University of Chile, Adolfo Ibáñez University and the University of Notre Dame (USA).

== Public office ==
Arellano was the Budget Director of the Ministry of Finance from 1990 to 1996. During the same period, he was the alternate governor for Chile to the World Bank (WB). In September 1996, amid a huge teachers' strike, President Eduardo Frei Ruiz-Tagle entrusted him with the post of Minister of Education, a position he held until 2000, when the administration left office.(footnote 4) He is the longest-serving Minister of Education in the history of Chile. During his term, he pushed education reform, one of the major initiatives being the introduction of the full school day. As minister, he was also president of the National Monuments Council. He was president of the Assembly of the Organization for Education in Iberoamerica (1996-1998), and was also Chairman of the Council of Presidents of Chilean Universities and president of the Higher Education Council. He served as president of Fundación Chile and has participated on the boards of Televisión Nacional de Chile and BancoEstado. In March 2006, he was appointed by President Bachelet as CEO of Codelco, a position in which he had to face challenges ranging from union pressures to criticism of increased costs from various sectors. During his term, he won the approval of Codelco's new corporate governance law. He left this position in May 2010, returning to the private sector.

== Other activities ==
Arellano has been a consultant to the World Bank, the Inter-American Development Bank (IDB), the International Monetary Fund (IMF) and the United Nations (ECLAC and UNDP). He has served as a consultant and participated in technical assistance missions in Argentina, Brazil, Colombia, Costa Rica, Ecuador, the Philippines, Latvia, Lithuania, Peru and Romania. He was a member of the board of Viña Santa Rita, Falabella, Empresas Iansa, Seguros de Vida la Construcción and the Self-Regulatory Council for the Insurance Industry, among others. He was also chairman of the Justice and Peace Commission of the Chilean Episcopal Conference. He has published articles in several academic journals and is the author of five books.

== Works ==
- Políticas sociales Chile 1990-2009 (2011)
- Reforma educacional: prioridad que se consolida (2000)
- Políticas Macroeconómicas (1986)
- Políticas sociales y desarrollo (1985)
- Las desigualdades económicas y la acción del Estado (1980)
- Public Sector Deficits and Macroeconomic Stability in Developing Economies (Download PDF)
- Structural change in Chile:From fiscal deficits to surpluses (Download PDF)
- Copper Mining and its Impact on Chile's Development
- Francisco Orrego Vicuña; José Pablo Arellano (2000). Chile en la perspectiva de un nuevo milenio: ideas clave para alcanzar un pleno desarrollo. Academia Chilena de Ciencias Sociales Politicas y Morales. ISBN 978-956-13-1647-8.

== Awards ==
- Top of class Catholic University business and economics majors 1974
- Fundación Futuro award for public service 1996
- Distinguished alumnus of the Catholic University 2008
- "Alumnus of the year" 2011, Fundación Ingenieros Comerciales, Catholic University
