= Narciso Irureta =

Chilean politician (1924–2005)

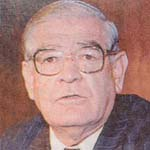
- Narciso Irureta Aburto

Minister of Transport and Telecommunications
- In office 11 March 1994 – 28 September 1996
- President: Eduardo Frei Ruíz-Tagle
- Preceded by: Germán Molina Valdivieso
- Succeeded by: Claudio Hohmann

Member of the Senate of Chile
- In office 15 May 1969 – 21 September 1973
- Succeeded by: Dissolution of the Congress
- Constituency: 9th Provincial Agrupation (Valdivia, Osorno and Llanquihue)

Member of the Chamber of Deputies of Chile
- In office 15 May 1965 – 15 May 1969
- Constituency: 24th Departamental Agrupation (Llanquihue, Puerto Varas, Maullín, Calbuco, Puerto Aysén, Coyhaique and Chile Chico)

Personal details
- Born: 30 June 1924 Valdivia, Chile
- Died: 26 December 2005 (aged 81) Santiago, Chile
- Party: National Falange (1945−1957); Christian Democratic Party (1957−2005)
- Spouse: María Teresa Uriarte
- Children: Six
- Parent(s): Narciso Irureta; Edma Aburto
- Education: University of Chile (LL.B)
- Occupation: Politician
- Profession: Lawyer

Narciso Irureta Aburto (30 June 1924 − 26 December 2005) was a Chilean politician of Basque descent.

== Political career ==
=== Early political involvement ===
He began his political career in 1939 when he joined the newly established National Falange. During his university years, he served as national leader of the Falangist university movement, and from 1945 was a member of the party's National Board.

In 1957, he became a founding member of the Christian Democratic Party (PDC). That same year, he joined the party's National Council and served as president of its 8th district organization. In 1959, he was appointed national secretary of the party, and in 1960 became its national president.

=== Parliamentary career ===
In the 1965 Chilean parliamentary election, he was elected to the Chamber of Deputies for the 24th Departmental Constituency, comprising Llanquihue, Puerto Varas, Maullín, Calbuco, Aysén, Coyhaique, and Chile Chico. He served during the 1965–1969 legislative term and was a member of the standing committees on Finance and on Mining and Industry. Within the Christian Democratic Party, he also served as first vice president from 1966 to 1967.

In 1969, he was elected to the Senate for the 9th Provincial Constituency, representing the provinces of Valdivia, Osorno, and Llanquihue, for the 1969–1977 term. During his tenure, he served as alternate member of the standing committees on Foreign Relations, Constitution, Legislation, Justice and Rules, Finance, and Mining.

His senatorial term ended prematurely following the 1973 Chilean coup d'état. Decree Law No. 27 of 21 September 1973 dissolved the National Congress of Chile and terminated the mandates of all members of Congress.

=== Late political career ===
In 1971, he served as national president of the Christian Democratic Party. Between 1982 and 1985, he served as the party's second vice president, and from 1987 to 1990 as first vice president, during the years when opposition political parties operated clandestinely under the military dictatorship of Augusto Pinochet.

In June 1994, he co-authored an article with other Christian Democratic leaders on the family and divorce, expressing strong opposition to the legalization of divorce with dissolution of marriage.

He served as Minister of Transport and Telecommunications from 1994 to 1996 during the administration of Eduardo Frei Ruiz-Tagle. Among his responsibilities, he became the first minister to chair the National Traffic Safety Commission.

He died in late 2005 from a heart condition.
