= René Cortázar =

Chilean economist and politician

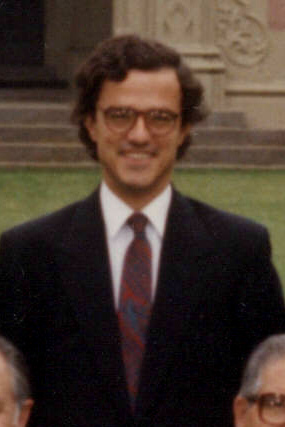

Minister of Transport and Telecommunications
- In office 27 March 2007 – 11 March 2010
- President: Michelle Bachelet
- Preceded by: Sergio Espejo
- Succeeded by: Felipe Morandé

Minister of Labor and Social Welfare
- In office 11 March 1990 – 11 March 1994
- President: Patricio Aylwin
- Preceded by: María Teresa Infante
- Succeeded by: Jorge Arrate

Personal details
- Born: 29 February 1952 (age 74) Santiago, Chile
- Party: Amarillos por Chile (2022–present) Christian Democratic Party (1972–2022)
- Spouse: Ana María Valdés
- Children: Three
- Parent(s): René Cortázar Sagarminaga; Carmen Sanz Briso-Montiano
- Education: Pontifical Catholic University of Chile; Massachusetts Institute of Technology
- Occupation: Politician
- Profession: Economist

René Cortázar (Santiago, February 29, 1952) is a Chilean economist, researcher, academic, and politician of the Christian Democratic Party (PDC).

He was Minister of State for Presidents Patricio Aylwin and Michelle Bachelet.

== Biography ==
He is the second of the children of the marriage of the agricultural engineers René Cortázar Sagarminaga and Carmen Sanz Briso-Montiano. His father worked for many years at La Platina, a property of the University of Chile, where he carried out agricultural research. He was awarded the National Prize for Applied and Technological Sciences in 1994.

He studied at the Colegio del Verbo Divino in the capital and later graduated from PUC with a degree in business engineering. After graduating, he became a researcher-assistant at Cieplan, becoming one of the founders of the study center together with Alejandro Foxley, Ricardo Ffrench-Davis, and José Pablo Arellano.

Since 1975 he has been married to Ana María Valdés, with whom he had three daughters.

Then he went to the United States for two and a half years, where he received a doctorate in economics from the Massachusetts Institute of Technology (MIT) in Boston. Later he was a professor at the Institute of Economics of the Catholic University (PUC), a professor at the Department of Economics at the University of Chile, and a visiting professor at universities in Brazil and the United States.

== Political career ==
=== Beginning ===
In 1972 he became a Christian Democratic Party (PDC) member.

He was an active collaborator in the "No" campaign in the 1988 referendum, which sought to remove dictator Augusto Pinochet. His primary role was to be the coordinator of the labor commission of the opposition Coalition of Parties for Democracy.

=== Minister of Patricio Aylwin ===
In the Government of Patricio Aylwin (1990-1994), he served as Minister of Labor and Social Welfare.

As Aylwin's minister, he was responsible for enacting the first Labor Code approved in a democracy. For the first time in Chile, tripartite agreements were also signed between the Central Unitaria de Trabajadores, the Confederation of Production and Commerce and the government. During the same period, the Chile Joven program was implemented to train low-income unemployed youth.

Later, together with Juan Villarzú and Osvaldo Rosales, he coordinated the economic program of Eduardo Frei Ruiz-Tagle when he was a candidate for the Presidency of the Republic in the 1993 elections.

=== Executive director of TVN ===
Between 1995 and 2000, he was executive director of Televisión Nacional de Chile (TVN), establishing bases that made the state channel profitable.

During his period as executive director of Televisión Nacional de Chile from 1995 to 2000. He published a book of editorial Guidelines. In the elaboration of those Guidelines, there was ample participation of all the professionals of TVN. The Guidelines address issues related to professional responsibility and programming content in press and entertainment. Some chapters refer to privacy, protection of minors, women, violence, politics, elections, terrorism, and news related to TVN, among other topics.

There have been many debates with respect to the application of the Televisión Nacional de Chile Guidelines to specific issues, during the period that Cortázar was executive director of Televisión Nacional de Chile (1995-2000). For example, in the cases of journalistic investigations of the protection of minors and the asbestos issue.

=== Bachelet's Minister ===
On March 27, 2007, he became Minister of Transport and Telecommunications in the first government of Michelle Bachelet, replacing Sergio Espejo. His appointment was during the severe Transantiago Crisis regarding the urban transport system of the Chilean capital implemented in 2006. In December 2007, due to the growing and complex problems of the system, and as promised, he presented his resignation, but President Bachelet did not accept it.

During Michelle Bachelet, he assumed the position of Minister of Education as a surrogate before the suspension —which occurred on April 3, 2008— and subsequent dismissal thirteen days later of Yasna Provoste. On April 17, Mónica Jiménez was appointed as provoste's successor, Cortázar ceasing to hold office.

=== Subsequent activities ===
After being away from contingent politics, he began negotiations in 2011, to be proclaimed as the PDC candidate for the Senate for the Antofagasta Region. At the end of 2012, the region PDC board unanimously endorsed him, which cleared the way for the parliamentary elections of 2013. Despite this, he did not take part in the elections.

In 2013, he joined the programmatic team of Michelle Bachelet in her second candidacy for the Presidency of the Republic.

In 2021, Cortázar was part of the "Approval List" for district 8 in the 2021 conventional constituent elections. Cortázar's candidacy was ultimately unsuccessful despite being the one that received the largest sum of donations in all of Chile.

In 2022, he joined the Cristián Warnken's political movement Amarillos por Chile, which actively participated in the plebiscite on the Proposal for a New Constitution of the Constituent Convention, in defense of the rejection option. On September 23, the Yellow Movement for Chile began procedures to become a political party. In 2022, he presented his resignation from the Christian Democratic Party (PDC) after 50 years of militancy.

== Business career ==
Before becoming Minister of State, Cortázar was a member of the boards of D&S, Entel Chile, CorpBanca, Almacenes Paris, AES Gener, La Polar, Moneda, ILC and ICB He was also vice president of Icare and director of the Alberto Hurtado Center for Labor Studies. He also served as chairman of the board of directors of the Cieplan study center.

On August 10, 2010, four days after Andrónico Luksic Craig announced his entry into the station with 67% he became the chairman of the board of directors of Canal 13. He left office in July 2012 to rejoin Cieplan. In April 2015, he resumed responsibility at the station.
