= Correos de Chile =

State-owned postal service of Chile

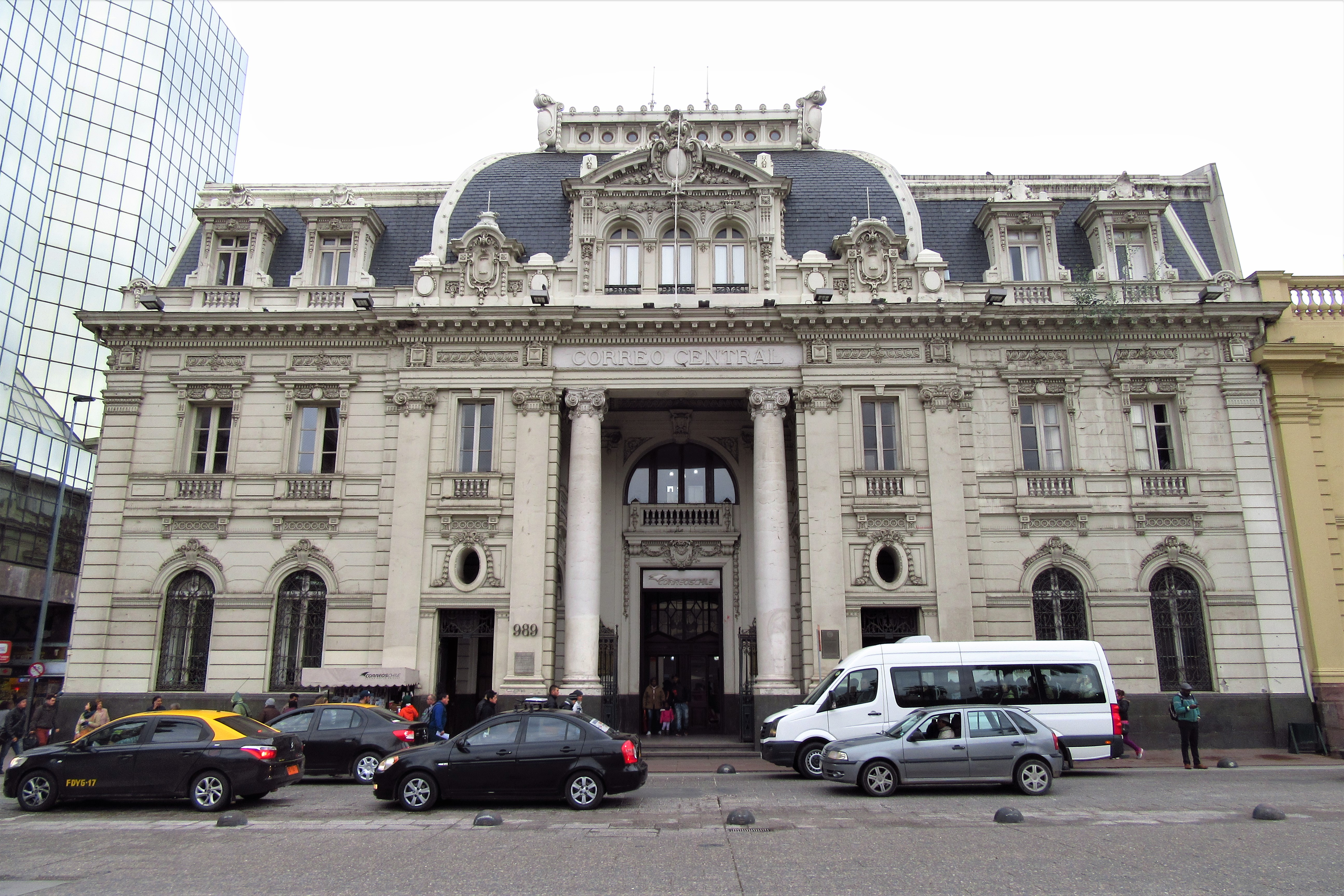
- Correo Central (National Main Post Office), Santiago
- Type: State-owned enterprise
- Industry: Postal services, courier
- Predecessor: Correo de Chile (1748); Dirección General de Correos (1854); Servicio de Correos, Telégrafos y Teléfonos (1920); Servicio de Correos y Telégrafos (1925)
- Founded: December 24, 1981; 44 years ago
- Website: www.correos.cl

Correos de Chile, also known as CorreosChile (ChilePost —not to be confused with the private mail and courier company ChilePost), is a Chilean state-owned and autonomous enterprise dedicated to the mailing, money transfers, and national/international courier services, and fulfilling the functions of Universal Postal Service.

It can trace its history back to the establishment of the first postal service in 1747, in the Captaincy General of Chile. The current state-owned enterprise was created by the DFL N° 10, December 24 of 1981, dissolving the previous SOE Servicio de Correos y Telégrafos (lit. 'Post and Telegraph Service'), separating mailing and Telex services, founding Telex-Chile (that was extinguished as a service following the rise of the internet, but still exists legally as enterprise, providing other telecommunications services). It is administratively under the Ministry of Transport and Telecommunications.
