= Citizen Left =

Defunct political party in Chile (1971–2018)

Citizen Left Izquierda Ciudadana
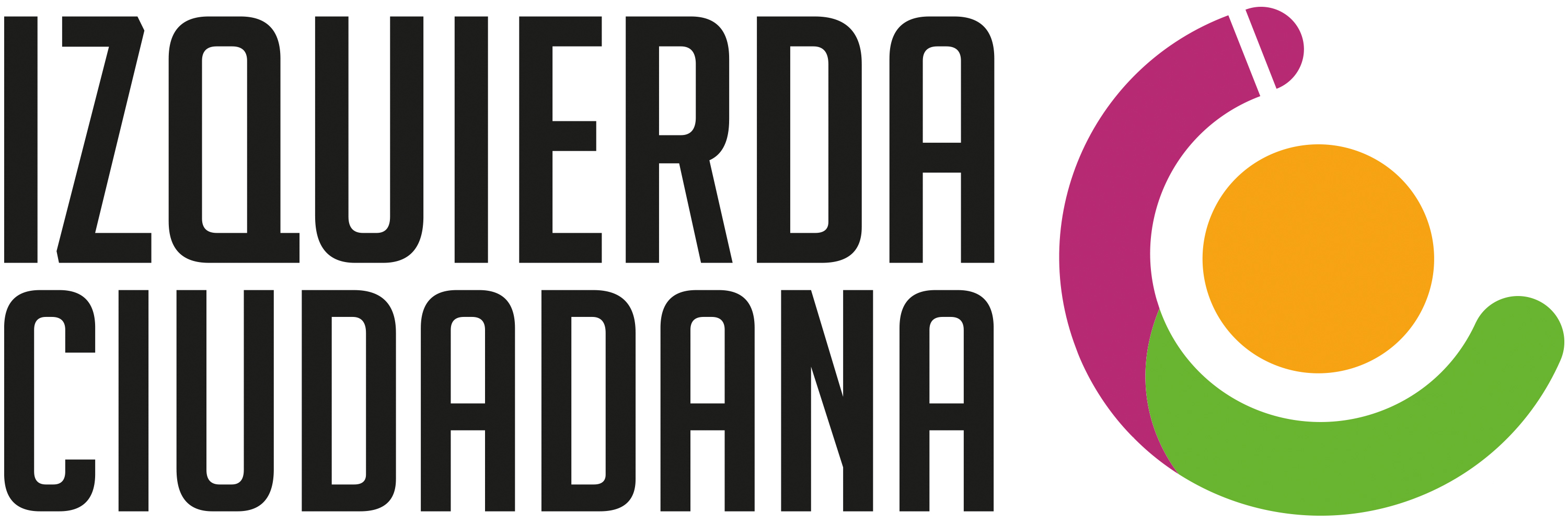
- Leader: Víctor Osorio Reyes
- Founded: 1971; 11 June 2012 (renamed)
- Dissolved: 2018
- Split from: Christian Democratic Party
- Merged into: MAS Citizen Left
- Coalition: New Majority
- Membership (2009): 2,078 (14th)
- Ideology: Socialism of the 21st century Christian socialism Liberation theology Christian humanism Christian left
- Political position: Left-wing
- International affiliation: São Paulo Forum
- Colours: Purple, green and yellow

Website
- www.izquierdaciudadana.cl

Emblem of the Christian Left Party (1971–2013)

The Citizen Left Party of Chile (Spanish: Partido Izquierda Ciudadana de Chile, IC), known until 2013 as Christian Left Party of Chile (Spanish: Partido Izquierda Cristiana de Chile, same acronym) was a Chilean left-wing political party. Founded in 1971, in its early days it was suppressed by the Pinochet dictatorship. It was part of the Nueva Mayoría coalition, supporting the presidential candidacy president Michelle Bachelet in 2013.

== History ==
The Christian Left Party was founded when a number of Christian Democrats left their party in protest against the party's cooperation with the right-wing forces and confrontation with the Allende government. Thus, on 31 July 1971, Bosco Parra declared that he saw no future for Christian left positions within the Christian Democrat party. He was joined by six other MPs, Fernando Buzeta, Jaime Concha, Alberto Jaramillo, Luis Maira, Pedro Urra and Pedro Videla Riquelme, as well as by Silvia Alvarez, the only woman and Luís Badilla, the leader of the Christian Democratic youth organization. At this stage, the new organization was joined by a number of MAPU militants (incl. 3 senators: Julio Silva Solar, Alberto Jerez Horta and Jacques Chonchol) who were dissatisfied with their party's affiliation with Marxism-Leninism.

Christian Left was part of the Unidad Popular coalition, and declared itself to be a revolutionary party of Christian and Humanist tradition, and in favour of constructing socialism. It tended to agree with the radical wing of the Unidad Popular (the leftist majority of the Socialist Party and parts of the MAPU). After the 1973 coup, the party members were subject to arrest and torture, like people from other leftist groups. The party's militants continued operating together with and within left-wing groups. After democracy was restored in Chile in 1990, most of the militants joined the Socialist Party while others continued as the Christian Left party.

In 2003, IC became a member of the political alliance "Together We Can Do More" (Spanish: Juntos Podemos Más), with the Communist Party of Chile and the Humanist Party. Their joint presidential candidate in 2005 was Tomás Hirsch of the Humanist Party. The second national congress of the Christian Left took place in 2006. The activists chose Manuel Jacques as the president of the Party.

On 3 October 2007, it started a process to re-enter the Political Party Registry (Spanish: Registro de Partidos Políticos), from which it was removed in 1989, for not having obtained enough votes to continue as a legal party. The process ended successfully on 25 May 2008, when the Electoral Service (Servicio Electoral) of Chile re-registered it as a legal political party.

In 2012 formed a party with other political leftist movements called Citizen Left. On the eve of the 2013 presidential election, the Citizen Left joined the opposition pact Nueva Mayoría and supported the presidential candidacy of Michelle Bachelet, formalizing its existence to change the legal name of the Christian Left in the Electoral Service. In 2018, Citizen Left merged with MAS Region to become MAS Citizen Left.

== Presidential candidates ==
The following is a list of the presidential candidates supported by the Citizen Left. (Information gathered from the Archive of Chilean Elections).

- 1988 plebiscite: "No" (won)
- 1989: Patricio Aylwin, PDC-Concertación (won)
- 1993: Eugenio Pizarro, Ind.-ADI (lost)
- 1999: Ricardo Lagos, PPD-Concertación (won)
- 2005: Tomás Hirsch, PH-Juntos Podemos (lost)
- 2009: Jorge Arrate, PCCh-Juntos Podemos (lost)
- 2013: Michelle Bachelet, PS-Nueva Mayoría (won)
- 2017: Alejandro Guillier, Ind.-Nueva Mayoría (lost)

== See also ==
- Christian left
- Christian socialism
- Liberation theology
