= José Joaquín Brunner =

Chilean politician (born 1944)

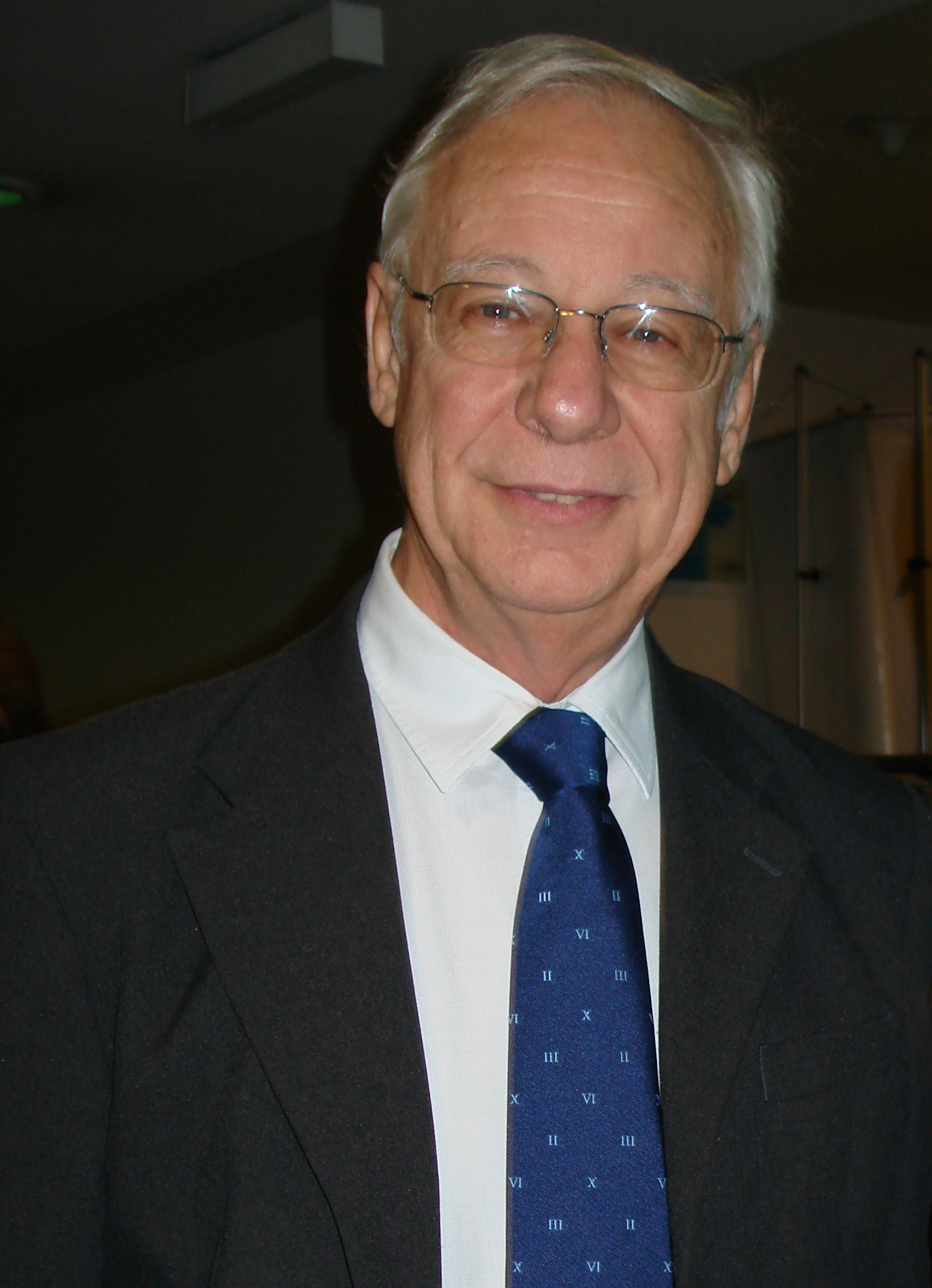

Ministry General Secretariat of Government
- In office 20 September 1994 – 1 August 1998
- President: Eduardo Frei Ruíz-Tagle
- Preceded by: Víctor Manuel Rebolledo
- Succeeded by: Jorge Arrate

Personal details
- Born: 5 December 1944 (age 81) Santiago, Chile
- Party: Christian Democratic Party; Popular Unitary Action Movement; Party for Democracy
- Spouse: Mónica Espinosa
- Children: Three
- Education: Pontifical Catholic University of Chile; University of Leiden (PhD)

José Joaquín Brunner Ried (born 5 December 1944) is a Chilean politician who served as minister.

He was a member of the center-left Party for Democracy (PPD) and served as Minister Secretary General of the Government during the administration of Christian Democratic President Eduardo Frei Ruiz-Tagle, between 1994 and 1998.

== Early life and education ==
Brunner is the son of lawyer and academic Helmut Brunner. He attended the German School in Santiago before undertaking undergraduate studies at the Pontifical Catholic University of Chile from 1963 to 1967. He later pursued postgraduate studies at the University of Oxford between 1973 and 1975.

Although he completed legal studies, Brunner never qualified as a lawyer. While in the United Kingdom, he obtained a certificate in university administration issued under the authority of the British government, a qualification roughly equivalent to a higher technical degree in Chile. In 2008, he earned a Ph.D. from Leiden University.

He is married to psychologist Mónica Espinosa, and they have three children.

== Political career ==
Brunner was successively a member of the Christian Democratic Party, the Popular Unitary Action Movement (MAPU), and the MAPU Obrero Campesino. In 1987, he became one of the founding members of the Party for Democracy (PPD).

President Eduardo Frei Ruiz-Tagle appointed him Minister Secretary-General of Government, a position he held from 1994 to 1998. He also served as president of the National Television Council (CNTV), president of the National Commission for Undergraduate Program Accreditation, vice president of the Higher Education Council, member of the Science Council of FONDECYT, and director of FLACSO.

In October 2013, Brunner became one of the founding members of the political movement Fuerza Pública, led by economist Andrés Velasco.

In February 2017, he announced that he was leaving the PPD, stating that he nevertheless remained committed to the ideals upon which the party had been founded.

Brunner has been described by some leaders of the Chilean student movement as one of the principal intellectual architects of Chile's market-oriented education system. He has also been the target of student protests, including public demonstrations known in Chile as funas.

== Academic career ==
Brunner has taught undergraduate, master's, and doctoral courses at numerous universities, including the Pontifical Catholic University of Chile, from which he was dismissed for political reasons following the 1973 Chilean coup d'état; the Adolfo Ibáñez University (2000–2007); the University of the Andes in Colombia; the Department of Educational Research at the Center for Research and Advanced Studies of the National Polytechnic Institute (Cinvestav) in Mexico; and the Autonomous University of Barcelona in Spain.

He has also served on the governing boards of the International Institute for Educational Planning (IIEP), the United Nations University, UNESCO's Futures Council, the International Development Research Centre (Canada), the Latin American Committee of the Social Science Research Council (United States), and the steering committee of the Latin American Council of Social Sciences (CLACSO).

Brunner has worked as an educational consultant for the World Bank, the United Nations Development Programme, the Economic Commission for Latin America and the Caribbean (ECLAC), the Swedish Agency for Research Cooperation, Canada's International Development Research Centre (IDRC), NOVIB, the Ford Foundation, and USAID. His consulting work has included projects in Bolivia, Brazil, Costa Rica, Chile, Ecuador, Nicaragua, Uruguay, Venezuela, Zimbabwe, Kenya, Ethiopia, Tanzania, Malaysia, Singapore, and South Korea. He is also the author of numerous books and essays.

He has been affiliated with the Institute for Research in the Social Sciences at the Diego Portales University and has served as president of the National Council for School Management Certification, based at Fundación Chile.
