= Enrique Correa =

Chilean politician (born 1945)

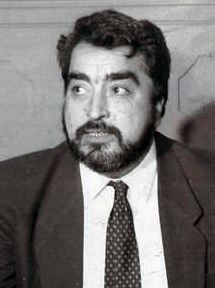

Minister Secretary General of Government
- In office 11 March 1990 – 11 March 1994
- President: Patricio Aylwin
- Preceded by: Cristián Labbé Galilea
- Succeeded by: Víctor Manuel Rebolledo

Personal details
- Born: 14 November 1945 (age 80) Ovalle, Chile
- Party: Christian Democratic Party (?−1969); Popular Unitary Action Movement (1969−1973); MAPU Obrero Campesino (1973−1985); Socialist Party (1985−present)
- Spouse(s): María Catalina Bau (1969−1991); María Verónica Paz (1992−present)
- Children: Six
- Parent(s): Fernando Correa; Loreta Ríos
- Education: Pontifical Catholic University of Chile (BA)
- Occupation: Politician
- Profession: Philosopher

Enrique Fernando Correa Ríos (born 14 November 1945) is a Chilean politician who served as minister of State under Patricio Aylwin's government (1990–1994) and Director of the Latin American Faculty of Social Sciences.

In Chile, Correa is well known for his lobbying activities with El Mostrador calling him "the king of lobby". He is the founder and owner of the lobbying company Imaginacción.

== Early life ==
Son of Enrique Correa Padilla and Loreto Ríos Medina, cousin of Germán Correa, he attended a public school and later the Liceo de Hombres in his hometown. At the age of twelve he joined the Christian Democratic Youth (JDC) and later became a seminarian in Santiago.

He studied philosophy at the Pontifical Catholic University of Chile, where he became close to Jaime Castillo Velasco and Rodrigo Ambrosio. In July 1967 he assumed the presidency of the Christian Democratic Youth, but two years later, following his reaction to the Puerto Montt massacre, he was brought before the party’s disciplinary tribunal and removed from office. He subsequently joined the Popular Unitary Action Movement (MAPU), a movement formed by former Christian Democrats and led by Ambrosio.

In 1969 he married commercial engineer María Catalina Bau Aedo, from whom he divorced in 1991, and the following year he entered into a second marriage with actress María Verónica Paz Eyzaguirre. From his marriages he had six children.

== Political career ==
On 7 March 1973, already a member of the MAPU, he took part in a party split alongside Fernando Flores.

After the 1973 Chilean coup d'état led by General Augusto Pinochet against the government of socialist president Salvador Allende, he sought asylum in the embassy of Peru and later travelled to the Soviet Union and the German Democratic Republic as a representative of the MAPU.

He lived underground during the dictatorship and, with the return to democracy, became one of the negotiators with Pinochetism.

=== Democratic period ===
During the 1980s, he served as general coordinator of the “No” campaign that led the 1988 Chilean national plebiscite, and joined the Socialist Party of Chile (PS).

He later worked on the presidential campaign of Patricio Aylwin, who, once elected president, appointed him Minister Secretary General of Government. After leaving office in 1994, he founded a consultancy that later evolved into the lobbying firm Imaginacción Consultores.

He served as director (1997) of the Latin American Faculty of Social Sciences (FLACSO), advising several governments, and was a member of the Commission on Historical Truth and New Deal with Indigenous Peoples, appointed by President Ricardo Lagos in 2001.

In July 2004 he resigned from the Socialist Party of Chile over disputes related to mining royalties. He requested readmission to the party in September 2009.

He is widely regarded as one of the country’s leading lobbyists. Through his firm Imaginacción, he has provided communications advice to figures such as Cristián Precht, former army commanders-in-chief Juan Miguel Fuente-Alba and Juan Emilio Cheyre, business groups Penta and SQM, former ministers Patricio Rosende and Javiera Blanco, film director Nicolás López and television director Herval Abreu.
