= Broad Left Movement =

Chilean leftwing political movement

The Broad Left Movement (Spanish:Movimiento Amplio de Izquierda) was a Chilean leftwing political movement. It was commenced in 2011 by several social actors belonging to the "extra-parliamentary left" as well as other former members of the Concertacion coalition that ruled Chile from 1990 to 2010. In 2014 it merged with other movements left in Convergence of the Left.

== History ==
The founding members of the movement included presidential candidate Jorge Arrate and former deputies Bosco Parra and Pedro Felipe Ramírez. Deputy Sergio Aguiló, joined the movement after tendering the resignation from Socialist Party of Chile. The groups which consolidated the movement involved Christian Left of Chile, New Left, the Allendista Socialist Party and the Allendista Socialist Action. The movement declared itself to be socialist in nature and was critical of the government of Sebastián Piñera. It also questioned the economic and social policies built during previous periods.

During the year 2012, the movement started to get divided, since a part of it, headed by Aguiló and Ramírez, approached the Radical Party. This segment finally merged with the Christian Left and formed the Citizen Left, the political party which was represented in the municipal elections under the covenant for a fair Chile, along with the Communist Party and the Party for Democracy. This part failed to become a part of the New Majority (Chile) coalition. Another fragment, led by Arrate, disapproved such an approach of the Concertación parties and for the same municipal elections, they formed an alliance with the Broad Social Movement and the Humanist Party. The remaining part of the movement, led by Eduardo Giesen, Francisco Carreras, Santiago Trincado, Paulina Fuenzalida and Luis Alorda joined the Todos a La Moneda pact and for the 2013 presidential election supported the candidacy of Marcel Claude, who won 2.81% of the votes. In 2014 they formed the Convergence of the Left movement, together with the New Left Movement, the Allendista Socialist Action, and members of the defunct Left Party. In the same year the movement is known to be dissolved with no further activities taken by them exclusively.
