= French Chileans =

French Chileans Franco-Chilien Franco-chileno
Total population
- 800,000

Regions with significant populations
- Throughout Chile

Languages
- Chilean Spanish, French, Basque, Occitan

Religion
- Predominantly Roman Catholicism

Related ethnic groups
- French people

French Chileans (French: Franco-Chilien, Spanish: franco-chileno) are Chilean citizens of full or partial French ancestry. Between 1840 and 1940, 20,000 to 25,000 French people immigrated to Chile. The country received the fourth largest number of French immigrants to South America after Argentina (300,000), Brazil (150,341) and Uruguay (more than 25,000).

== French immigration to Chile ==
The French came to Chile in the 18th century, arriving at Concepción as merchants, and in the mid-19th century to cultivate vines in the haciendas of the Central Valley, the homebase of world-famous Chilean wine. The Araucanía Region also has an important number of people of French ancestry, as the area hosted settlers arrived by the second half of the 19th century as farmers and shopkeepers. With akin Latin culture, the French immigrants quickly assimilated into mainstream Chilean society.

From 1840 to 1940, around 25,000 Frenchmen immigrated to Chile. 80% of them were coming from Southwestern France, especially from Basses-Pyrénées (Basque country and Béarn), Gironde, Charente-Inférieure and Charente and regions situated between Duran, Gers, and Dordogne.

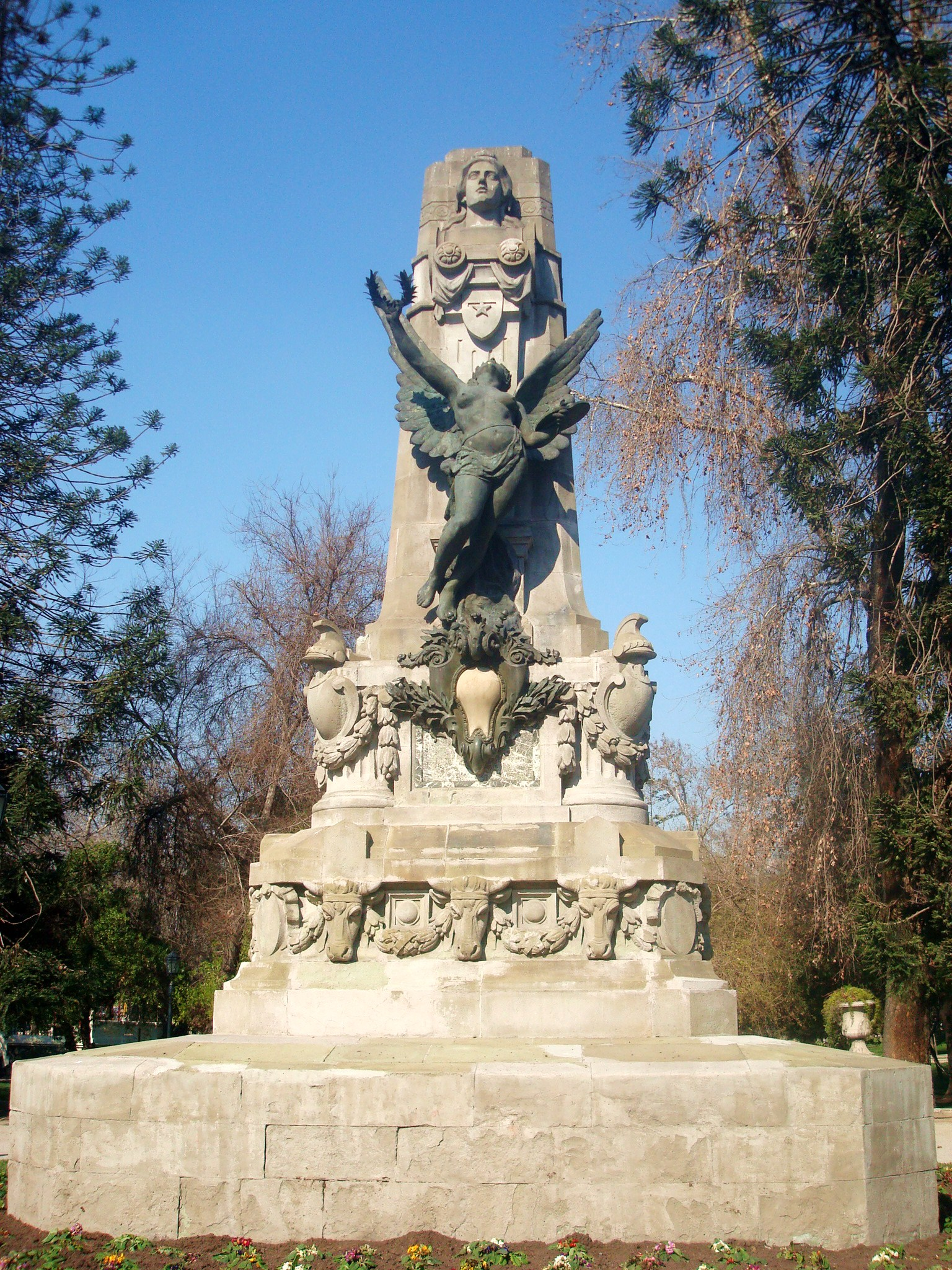
"Monument of the French Colony to the Centennial of Chile", located in the Parque Forestal of Santiago.

Most of French immigrants settled in the country between 1875 and 1895. Between October 1882 and December 1897, 8,413 Frenchmen settled in Chile, making up 23% of immigrants (second only after Spaniards) from this period. In 1863, 2,650 French citizens were registered in Chile. At the end of the century they were almost 30,000. According to the census of 1865, out of 83,220 foreigners established in Chile, 6,483 were French, the third largest European community in the country after Germans and Englishmen. In 1875, the community reached 3,000 members, 12% of the almost 85,000 foreigners established in the country. It was estimated that 10,000 Frenchmen were living in Chile in 1912, 7% of the 149,400 Frenchmen living in Latin America.

In World War II, a group of over 10,000 Chileans of French descent joined the Free French Forces and fought the Nazi occupation of France.

Today it is estimated that 950,000 Chileans are of French descent. Former president of Chile, Michelle Bachelet is of French origin. Former dictator Augusto Pinochet is another Chilean of French descent. A large percentage of politicians, businessmen, professionals and entertainers in the country are of French ancestry.

== Legacy ==
French painter Raymond Monvoisin lived in Chile from 1842 to 1854 and founded the Academy of Fine Arts of Santiago. French architect François Brunet de Baines founded the city's first school of architecture.

== Prominent French Chileans ==
- Andrés Allamand, politician and Minister of Defense (2011-2012)
- Alberto Bachelet, Air Force General and father of Michelle Bachelet
- Michelle Bachelet, twice President of Chile and former head of UN Women
- Gonzalo Barroilhet, decathlete.
- Bartolomé Blanche, Army General and provisional President of Chile (1932)
- Vivianne Blanlot, politician and former Minister of Defense (2006-2007)
- María Luisa Bombal Anthes, writer
- Eduardo Bonvallet, former football player and sports commentator
- Jorge Boonen
- Marta Brunet, writer
- César Caillet, actor
- Alfredo Capdeville Soto, actor and cast in famous film Golondrina 1924
- Paul Capdeville, tennis player
- Adolfo Couve
- Cristián de la Fuente Sabarots, actor
- Hugo Droguett, football player
- Alberto Fouilloux, former football player and sports commentator
- Eduardo Fournier, football player
- Alberto Fuguet, writer
- Augusto d'Halmar, writer
- Lucía Hiriart, former First Lady of Chile (1973-1990)
- Francisca Imboden, actress
- Manuel Jacques, politician
- Aline Küppenheim, actress
- Enrique Lafourcade, writer
- Denisse Laval Soza, aka Nicole, singer
- Isabel Le Brun de Pinochet
- Juan Carlos Letelier
- Orlando Letelier
- René Letelier
- Fernando Martel, football player
- Evelyn Matthei Fornet, politician and Minister of Labour (2011–13)
- Josefina Montané, model and actress
- Cecilia Morel, First Lady of Chile (2010–14 and 2018-2022)
- Alfredo Moreno Charme, businessman and Minister of Foreign Affairs (2010–14)
- Maite Orsini Pascal, model and actress
- Manuel José Ossandón, politician and Senator
- Nicole Perrot, golf player
- Magdalena Petit, writer
- Francisco Pichott, athlete
- Augusto Pinochet, Army General and military dictator (1973-1990)
- Lucía Pinochet, politician
- Belus Prajoux, tennis player
- Jaime Ravinet, politician
- Manuel Recabarren Rencoret
- Francisco Reyes Morandé, actor
- Álvaro Rudolphy Fontaine, actor
- René Schneider Chereau, Army General
- Juan Subercaseaux
- Luis Subercaseaux
- Anita Tijoux, singer, rapper
- Gabriel Valdés Subercaseaux, politician
- Stephanie Vaquer, professional wrestler
- Manuel Camilo Vial
- Roberto Viaux, Army officer
- Ramón Vinay, operatic tenor

== See also ==
- Chile–France relations
- Subercaseaux family
- Chileans in France
