= Chile–France relations =

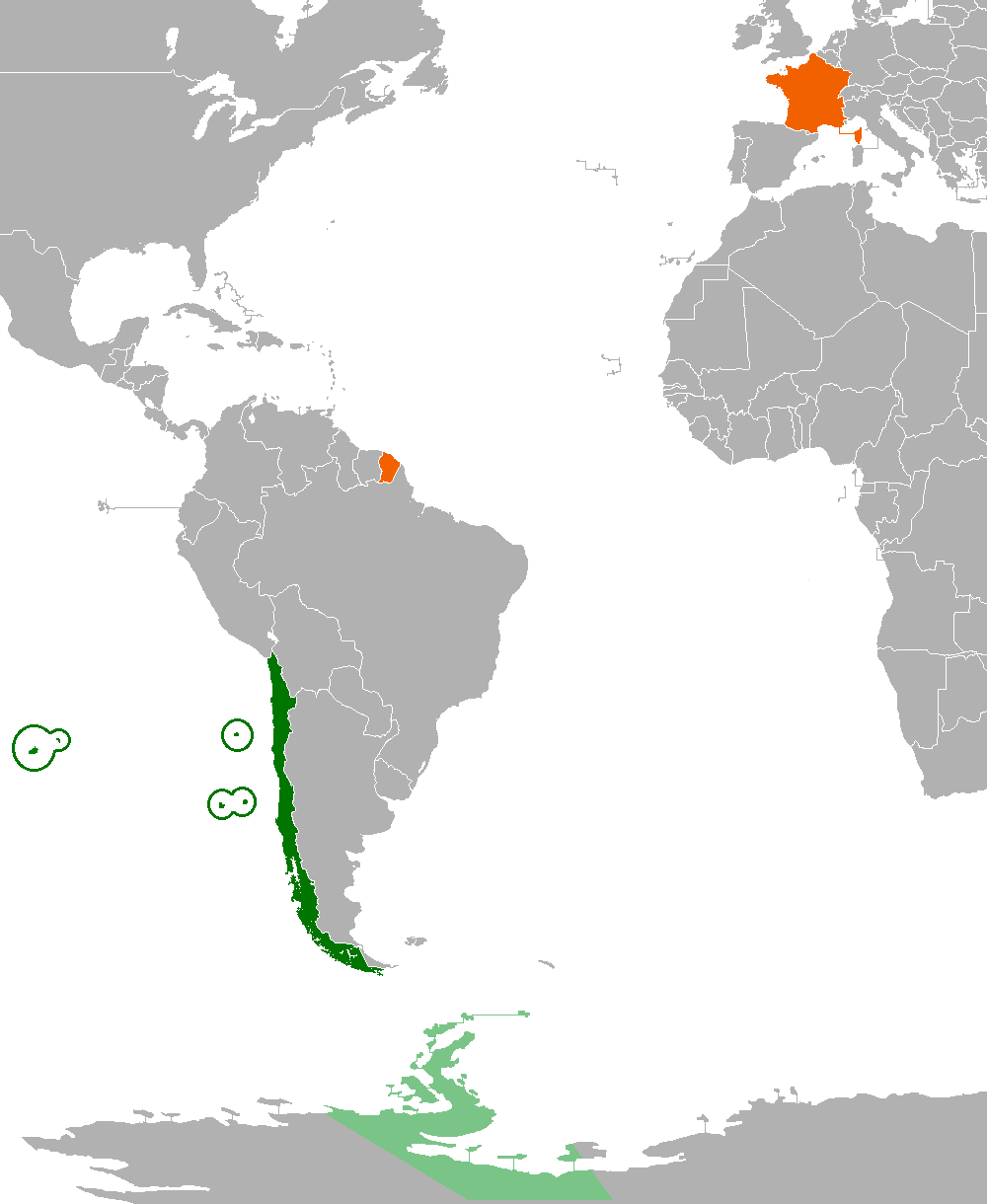
- Chile: France

Chile–France relations are the diplomatic and historical relations between the Republic of Chile and the French Republic. Both nations are members of the Organisation for Economic Co-operation and Development, World Trade Organization and the United Nations.

== History ==
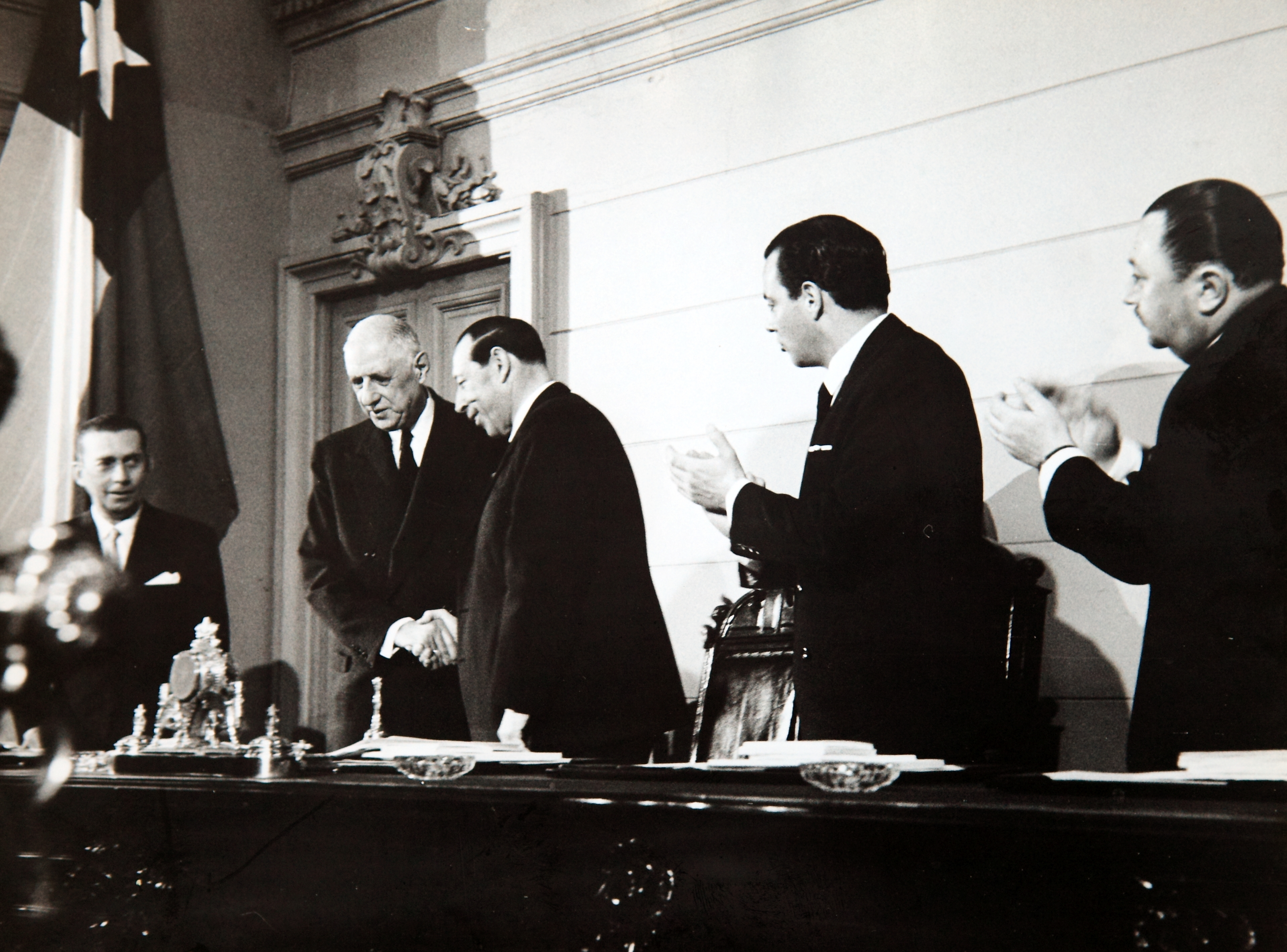
French President Charles de Gaulle on a visit to the Senate of Chile in Santiago, 1964.

In the early nineteenth century, French migrants began immigrating to Chile. Many of them were political exiles, former soldiers and scientists. In 1846, Chile and France established diplomatic relations after the signing of the "Treaty of Friendship, Trade and Navigation." From 1860, several thousand French migrants arrived and settled in Chile.

During the Spanish Civil War, Chilean Special Consul for Immigration in Paris, Pablo Neruda charted a French steamer called the SS Winnipeg with 2,200 Spanish refugees who had fled Spain during the civil war. Many were living in squalid conditions in internment camps in France. The ship departed France in August 1939 and arrived to the Chilean port of Valparaíso on 3 September 1939. During World War II, Chile remained neutral throughout the war. In 1943, Chile broke diplomatic relations with the Axis powers. During this time period, Chilean pilot, Margot Duhalde traveled to Europe where she joined the Air Transport Auxiliary and piloted 1,500 aircraft from English bases to combat zones in France.

Economic and cultural relations increased between France and Chile in the 1960s and 1970s. In 1964, French President Charles de Gaulle paid an official visit to Chile, becoming the first sitting French President to visit the country. In 1965, President Eduardo Frei Montalva became the first Chilean head-of-state to pay an official visit to France. In 1971, Pablo Neruda was named ambassador of Chile to France where he served until 1973. While in France, Neruda received the Nobel Prize in Literature.

On 11 September 1973, Chile experienced a coup d'état when forces loyal to General Augusto Pinochet took over the government from President Salvador Allende. Thousands of Chileans fled the country fearing persecution. On the 28 September 1973, France began accepting Chilean refugees for resettlement. Soon after the coup, France severed diplomatic relations with Chile due to the government's human rights abuses. Relations between Chile and France were re-established in 1989 when democracy was restored in Chile. In 2003, French journalist Marie-Monique Robin aired a documentary titled Escadrons de la mort: l’école française (Death Squads: The French School) on French television channel Canal+. In the documentary, Ms. Robin stated that she had discovered archives in the Quai d'Orsay that showed that the government of French President Valéry Giscard d'Estaing had collaborated with General Augusto Pinochet and the United States in Operation Condor, a campaign of political repression and state terror involving intelligence operations and assassination of opponents in Chile and to eradicate communist or Soviet influence and ideas. In February 2004, French Foreign Minister Dominique de Villepin on a trip to Chile stated that there had been no cooperation between France and Chile's military regime.

Since the re-establishment of diplomatic relations between the two nations, relations have improved considerably. There have been several high-level visits between leaders of both nations and both nations have signed numerous bilateral agreements.

== High-level visits ==
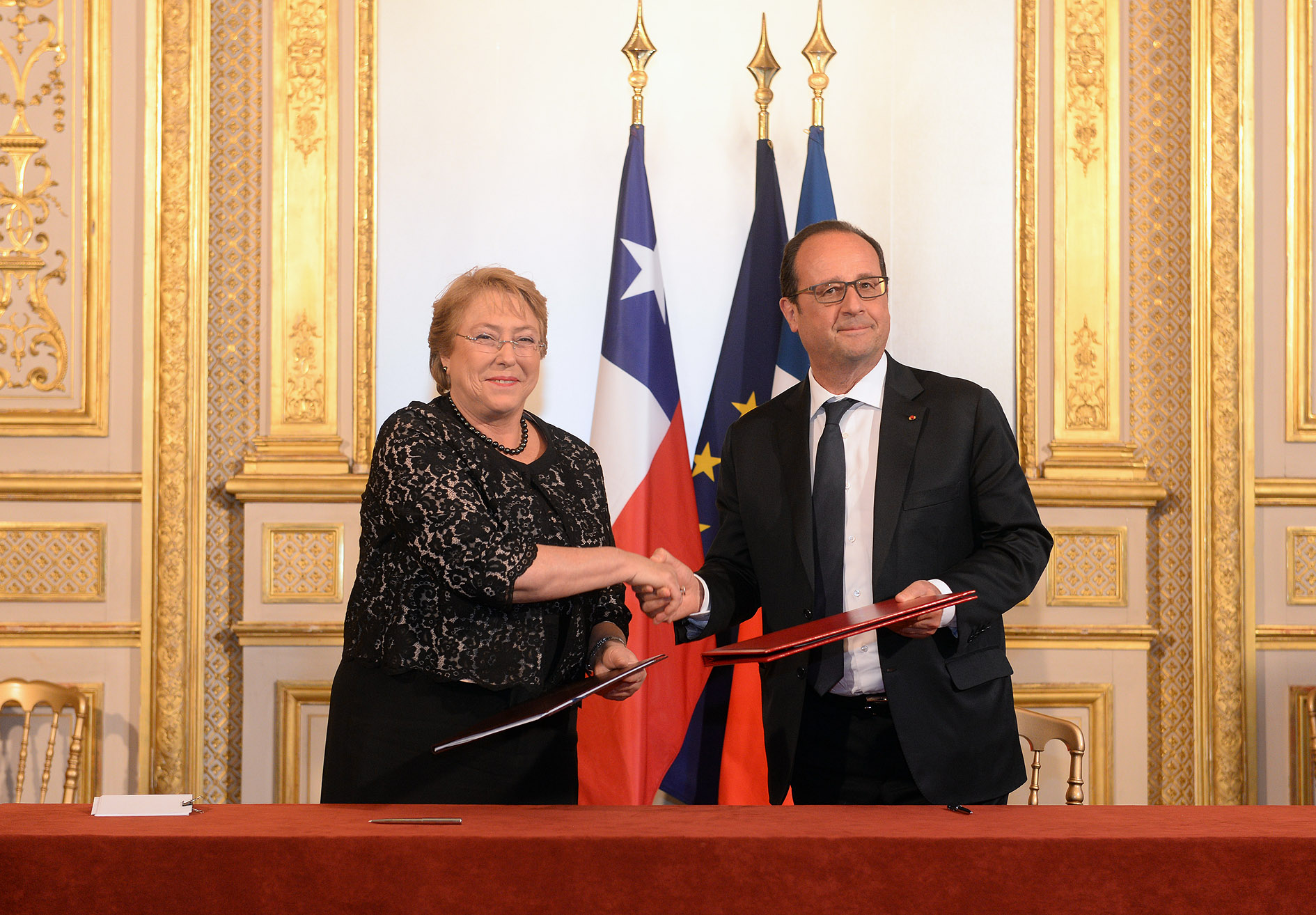
French President François Hollande meeting with Chilean President Michelle Bachelet in Paris, 2015.

Presidential visits from Chile to France

- President Eduardo Frei Montalva (1965)
- President Eduardo Frei Ruiz-Tagle (1997)
- President Ricardo Lagos (2001)
- President Michelle Bachelet (2009, 2015, 2016)
- President Sebastián Piñera (2010, 2021)

Presidential visits from France to Chile

- President Charles de Gaulle (1964)
- President Jacques Chirac (2006)
- President François Hollande (2017)
- President Emmanuel Macron (2024)

== Bilateral agreements ==
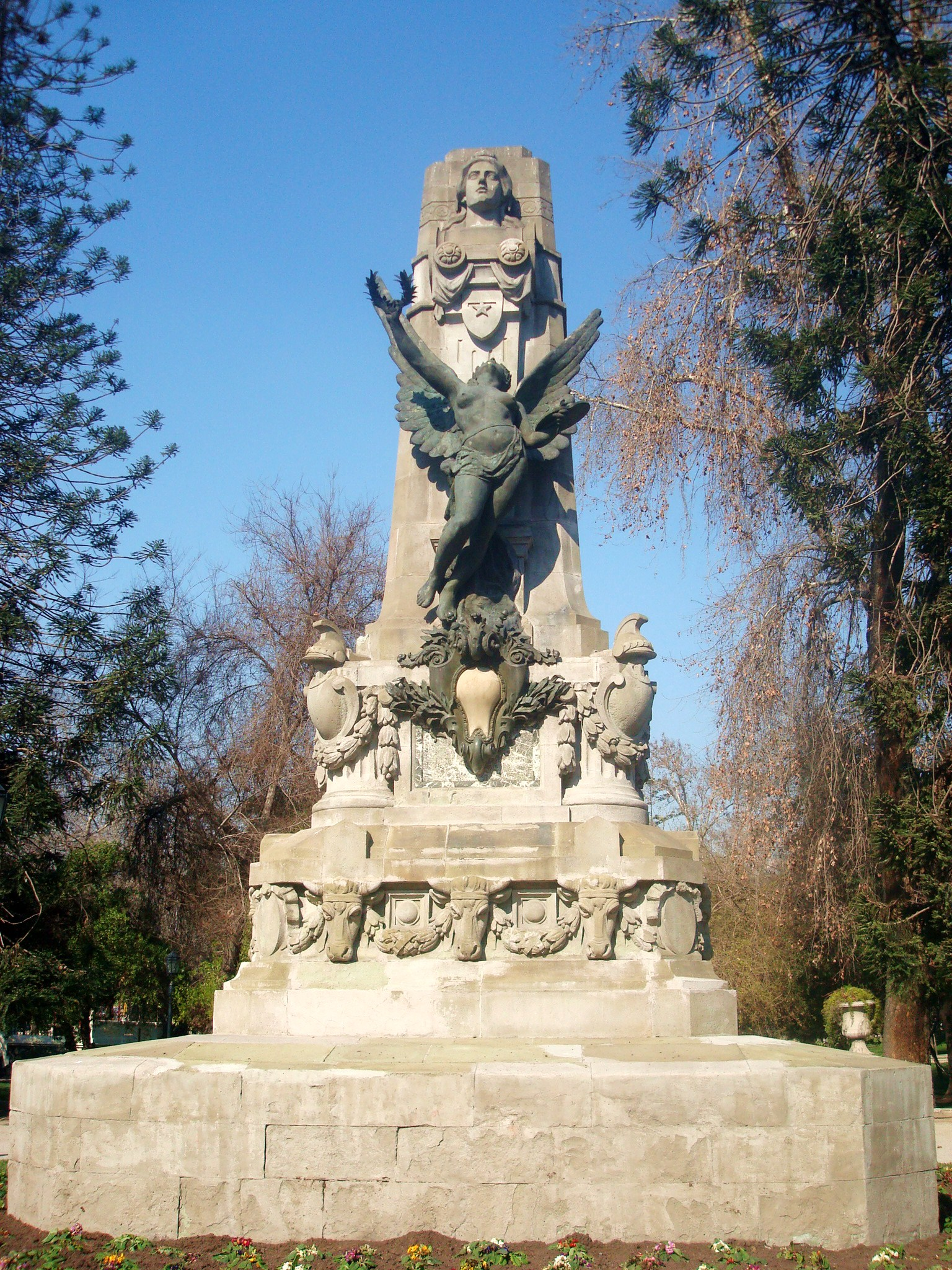
Monument donated by the French community in Chile in commemoration of Chile's centenary.

Both nations have signed several bilateral agreements such as an Agreement on Cultural Cooperation (1955), Agreement on Technical and Scientific Cooperation (1962); Agreement on Social Security (1999); Agreement on Bilateral Cooperation on Climate Change (2003); Agreement on the avoidance of Double-Taxation and Tax Evasion (2004); Agreement on Renewable Energy Cooperation (2009); Agreement on a Working holiday visa (2015) and an Agreement on the Promotion of Tourism between both nations (2015).

== Transportation ==
There are direct flights between Santiago and Paris with Air France and LATAM Chile and direct flights between Santiago and Papeete, French Polynesia, also with LATAM Chile.

== Trade ==
In 2002, Chile signed a free trade agreement with the European Union (which includes France). In 2017, trade between Chile and France totaled €2 billion Euros. Chile's main exports to France include: Cooper; fruits and seeds; wood paste; fish and crustaceans; and wine. France's main exports to Chile include: Nuclear reactors, boilers, machines and apparatus; automobiles and tractors; machinery and electrical material; pharmaceuticals; and chemical based products. Chile is France's second largest trading partner in South America (after Brazil).

== Resident diplomatic missions ==
- Chile has an embassy in Paris.
- France has an embassy in Santiago.
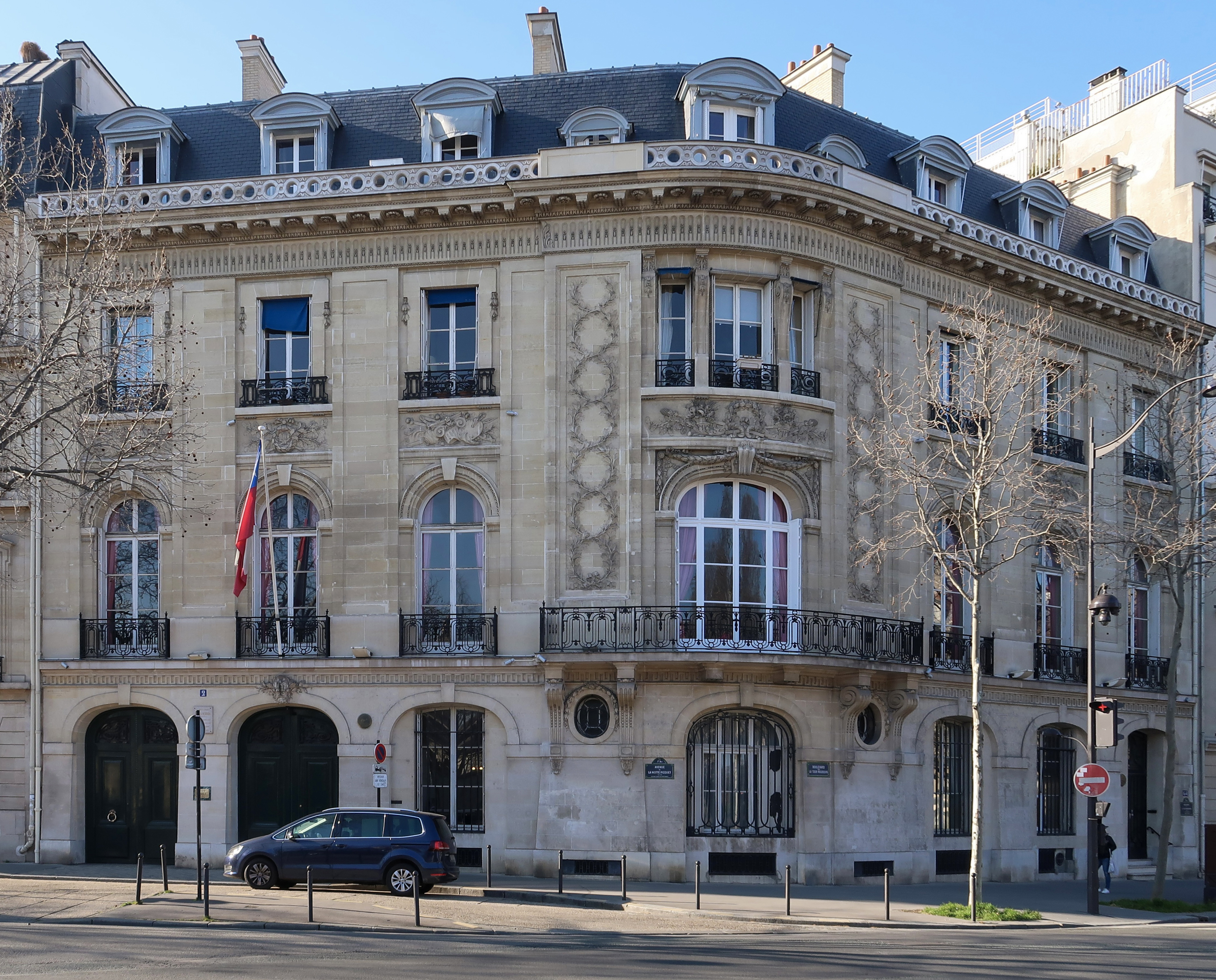
Embassy of Chile in Paris

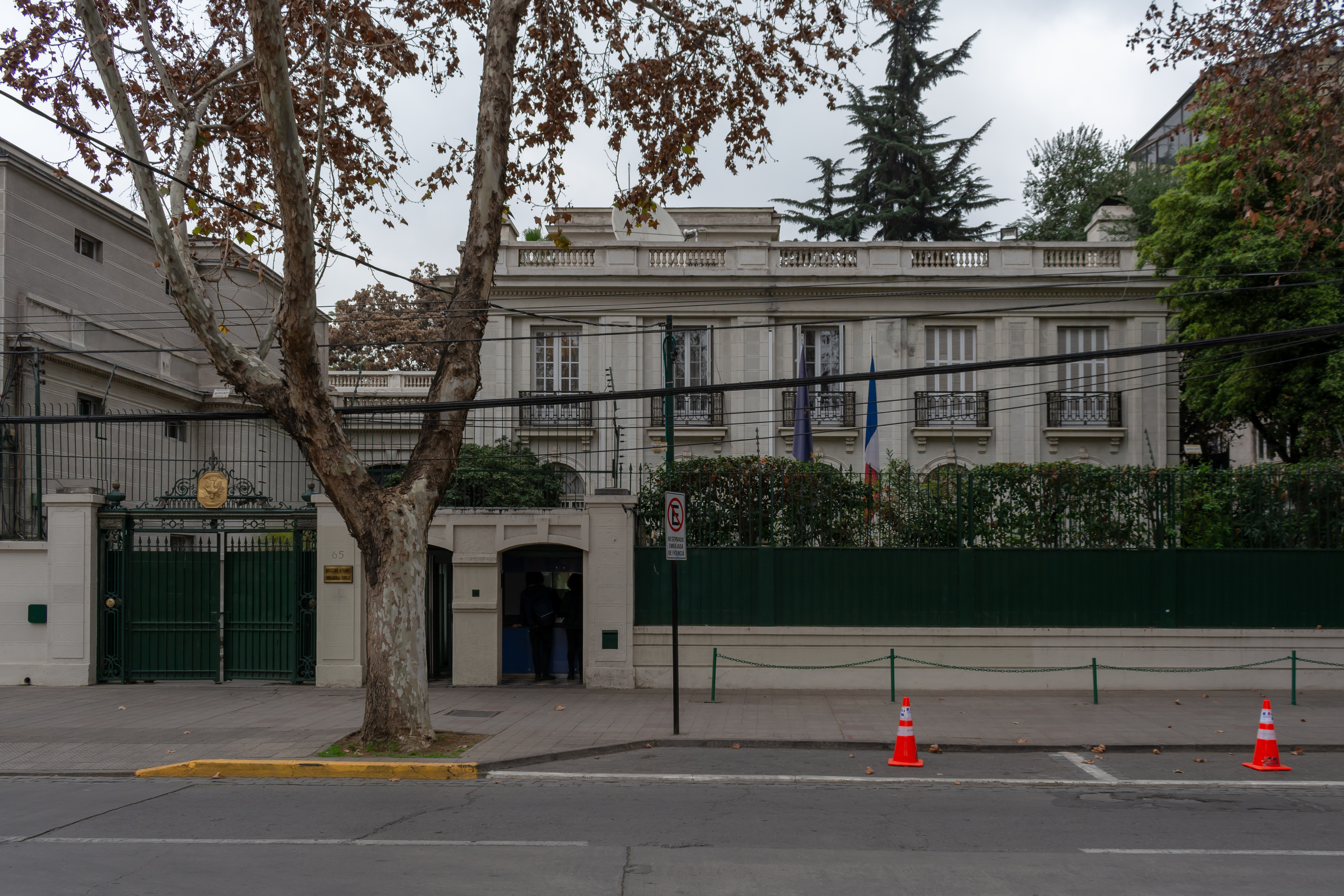
Embassy of France in Santiago

== See also ==
- Foreign relations of Chile
- Foreign relations of France
- Chileans in France
- French Chilean
