= Popular Unitary Action Movement =

Popular Unitary Action Movement Movimiento de Acción Popular Unitaria
- Leader: Historical Leaders; Jacques Chonchol; Rodrigo Ambrosio; Eduardo Aquevedo; Kalki Glauser; Óscar Guillermo Garretón
- Founded: May 19, 1969
- Dissolved: June 8, 1994
- Split from: Christian Democratic Party
- Headquarters: Santiago de Chile
- Ideology: Liberation theology Christian socialism Marxism; Democratic socialism
- Political position: Left-wing
- National affiliation: Popular Unity (1969–1973); People's Democratic Movement (1983–1987)

Party flag

The Popular Unitary Action Movement or MAPU (Spanish: Movimiento de Acción Popular Unitario) was a leftist political party in Chile. It was part of the Popular Unity coalition during the government of Salvador Allende. MAPU was repressed during the dictatorship of Augusto Pinochet. In this period, some of its most radical members formed the Movimiento Juvenil Lautaro, whose leaders were political prisoners during the dictatorship and with the return to democracy. Another faction of the former members of the party joined the social democratic Party for Democracy in 1987.

MAPU was part of the Popular Unity coalition of progressive political parties working to expand the role of everyday people in politics within Allende's government. It worked alongside the Socialist Party (PS) Revolutionary Left Movement (MIR), the Radical Party (PR) and Christian Left (IC) and dissented from Allende and the Communist Party to support a leftist counter-protest on May 12, 1972. This was known as "the first People's Assembly."

== History ==
MAPU was first formed as a splinter group of the Christian Democratic Party of Chile on May 19, 1969. At the time, Christian Democrats were in the government and many party members, especially among the youth, became critical of the party's policies that they regarded as 'pro-American' and 'pro-imperialist'. It joined the Unidad Popular coalition of Salvador Allende and participated in his government. The party's ideological 'line' was not clearly defined at first. In fact, the party leaders were encouraged by Allende and Fidel Castro (whom the MAPU delegation met in 1972 when visiting Cuba) not to embrace Marxism officially, since there were such parties in Chile already, and the Unidad Popular coalition wished to claim a Christian Left niche, too (the newly founded Izquierda Cristiana was considered too small).

During the Second Congress of the party, held in 1972, the forces led by Óscar Guillermo Garretón and Eduardo Aquevedo gained prominence. They officially adhered to 'Marxism-Leninism', had become more radicalized and oriented themselves towards the non-aligned movement. A group of politicians (Jacques Chonchol, Rafael Agustín Gumucio, Alberto Jerez Horta and Julio Silva Solar) left to join the Izquierda Cristiana. On 7 March 1973, the MAPU split into two feuding groups: one organization, led by Oscar Guillermo Garretón and Eduardo Aquevedo embraced 'Marxism-Leninism and militant leftist positions'. This group was supported by the Socialist Party, the MIR and the Izquierda Cristiana. The other faction, led by Jaime Gazmuri and Enrique Correa criticized the former for what it regarded as 'ultraleftism' and formed a new party, MAPU Obrero Campesino, that was close to PCCh and followed more moderate tactics. Both groups remained in the Unidad Popular until it was overthrown.

== Presidential candidates ==
The following is a list of the presidential candidates supported by the Popular Unitary Action Movement. (Information gathered from the Archive of Chilean Elections).

- 1970: Salvador Allende (won)
- 1988 plebiscite: "No" (won)
- 1989: Patricio Aylwin (won)
- 1993: Eugenio Pizarro (lost)
