= Víctor Manuel Rebolledo =

Chilean politician

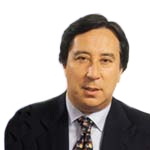

Member of the Chamber of Deputies
- In office 11 March 2002 – 11 March 2006
- Preceded by: Joaquín Palma Irarrázaval
- Succeeded by: Marcelo Díaz Díaz
- Constituency: 7th District (Andacollo, La Higuera, La Serena, Paihuano and Vicuña)
- In office 11 March 1990 – 11 March 1994
- Preceded by: District created
- Succeeded by: Isabel Allende Bussi
- Constituency: 9th District (Canela, Combarbalá, Illapel, Los Vilos, Monte Patria, Punitaqui and Salamanca)

Minister General Secretariat of Government
- In office 11 March 1994 – 20 September 1994
- President: Eduardo Frei Ruíz-Tagle
- Preceded by: Enrique Correa
- Succeeded by: José Joaquín Brunner

Personal details
- Born: 6 June 1949 (age 77) Illapel, Chile
- Party: Radical Party (1962); Party for Democracy (1987−2016)
- Education: University of Chile (LL.B); Complutense University of Madrid (LL.M)
- Occupation: Politician
- Profession: Lawyer

Víctor Manuel Rebolledo González (born 6 June 1949) is a Chilean politician and lawyer who served as member of the Chamber of Deputies of Chile and also served as minister of State.

In 2013, Rebolledo was a pre-candidate for the Chamber of Deputies of Chile. Similarly, he was a candidate for a seat in the Constitutional Convention.

== Biography ==
He was born on 6 June 1949. He is the son of Víctor Manuel Rebolledo Carrasco and María Yolanda González Villarroel. He married María Soledad Lascar Merino and is the father of Víctor Manuel, Pablo, Francisca, and Daniela.

=== Professional career ===
He completed his secondary education at the Internado Nacional Barros Arana. He later entered the Faculty of Law at the University of Chile, where he obtained a Bachelor of Laws degree. He was admitted to the bar before the Supreme Court on 24 January 1977.

In 2016 he earned a PhD in Law from the Complutense University of Madrid, Spain, with the dissertation "Desarrollo constitucional chileno desde la constitución de 1980".

== Political career ==
He began his political activity in the Radical Party and later joined the Socialist Youth, serving as World Vice President of the International Union of Socialist Youth. In 1977 he went into exile in Spain, where he pursued postgraduate studies and collaborated with the Spanish Socialist Workers’ Party (PSOE) during the leadership of Felipe González.

Upon returning to Chile in 1984, he became involved in efforts to unify the opposition and, in 1987, was among the founders of the Party for Democracy (PPD), serving on its Political Commission.

In 1989 he was elected to the Chamber of Deputies of Chile for District No. 9 in the Coquimbo Region (1990–1994). On 11 March 1994 President Eduardo Frei Ruiz-Tagle appointed him Minister Secretary General of Government, a post he held until September of that year.

He later ran unsuccessfully for the Senate in 1997 and subsequently served as Chile’s Ambassador to the Food and Agriculture Organization (FAO) from 1998 to 2000. In 2001 he was again elected deputy, this time for District No. 7 in the Coquimbo Region (2002–2006). In January 2003 he was stripped of parliamentary immunity.

After later unsuccessful electoral bids, he resigned from the PPD in December 2015. In January 2021 he launched a candidacy for the Constitutional Convention representing the Coquimbo Region on an independent list.
