= Chileans in France =

Chileans in France Chilenos en Francia
Total population
- 11,800 Chilean-born

Regions with significant populations
- throughout France

Languages
- French, Spanish

Religion
- Roman Catholicism

Related ethnic groups
- Uruguayans in France

Chileans in France consist mostly of refugees, but also other migrants such as students or economic workers, from Chile and their descendants in France.

== History ==
The overthrow of Salvador Allende on 11 September 1973, by a military junta, constitutes a major rupture in Chilean contemporary history. The violence of the Pronunciamento and the implementation of the tenets of the national security doctrine, supplemented by an ad hoc legislation, caused an enormous political, then economic migration, quite extraordinary for a Latin American country. In Europe, France as well as Sweden were part of the main host countries. The exiles were given a particularly good reception in France because of the positive echo of the Popular Unity experience. Yet, banishment was an additional act of violence for these people who were seriously weakened by the events they had experienced. The effects of the temporality of exile and the individual reconstruction imposed by its extension will lead these Chileans to redefine the roles of each member of the family unit and accept a long denied reality, in order to try to achieve the integration process. Thus, even if the conditions of reception were favorable, the exiles had to rebuild their social connections, adapt to an unknown form of socialization and to often consent to be deskilled and resign themselves to remaining outsiders.

== Notable people ==
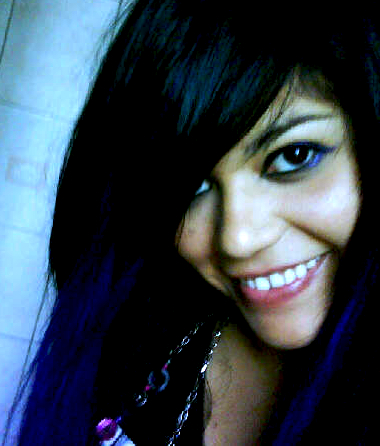
Jena Lee

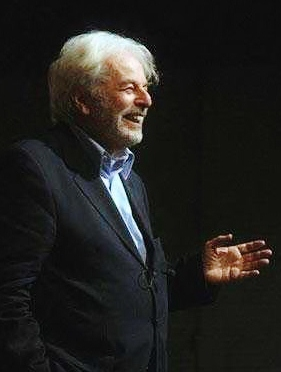
Alejandro Jodorowsky

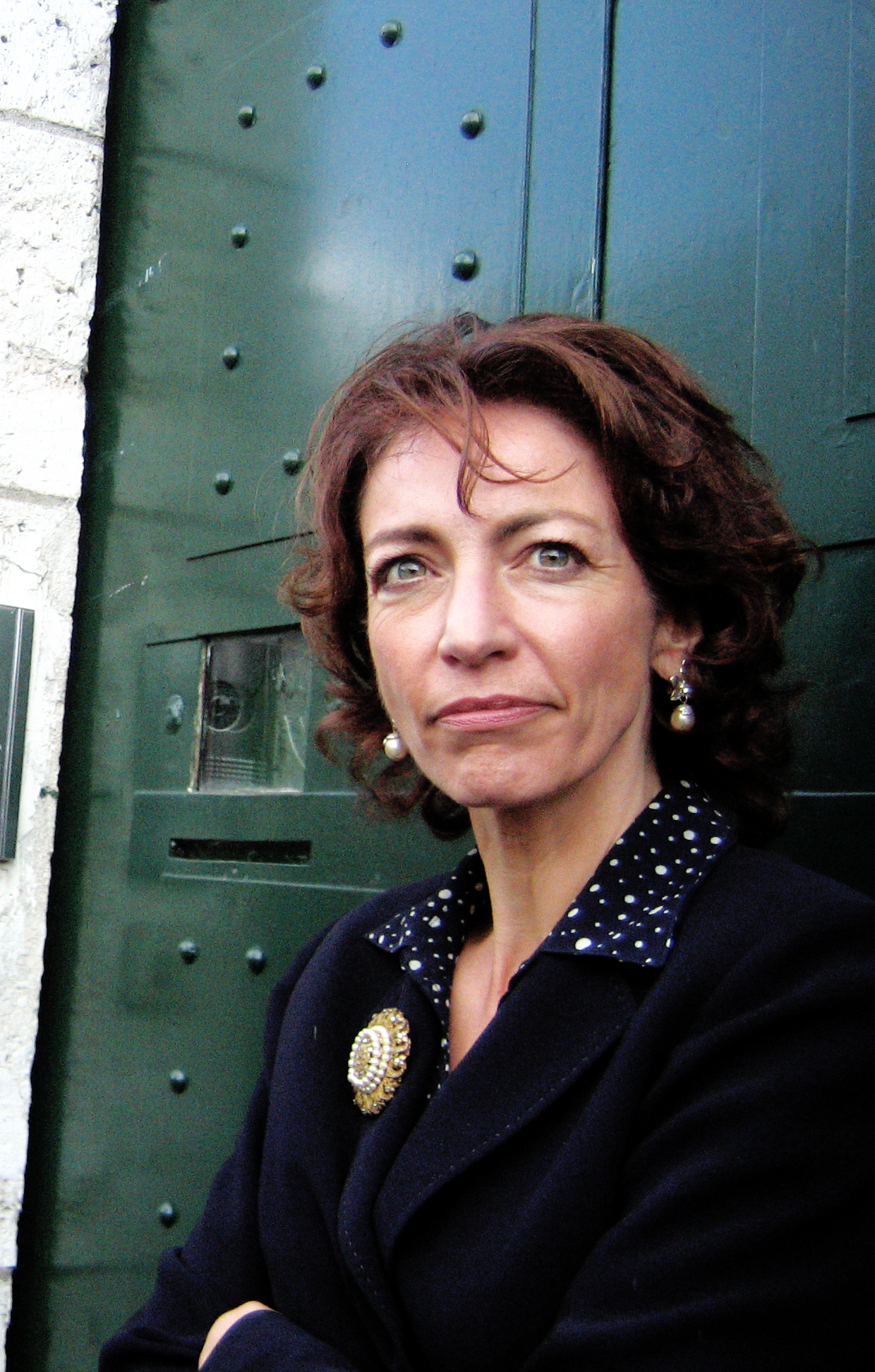
Marisol Touraine

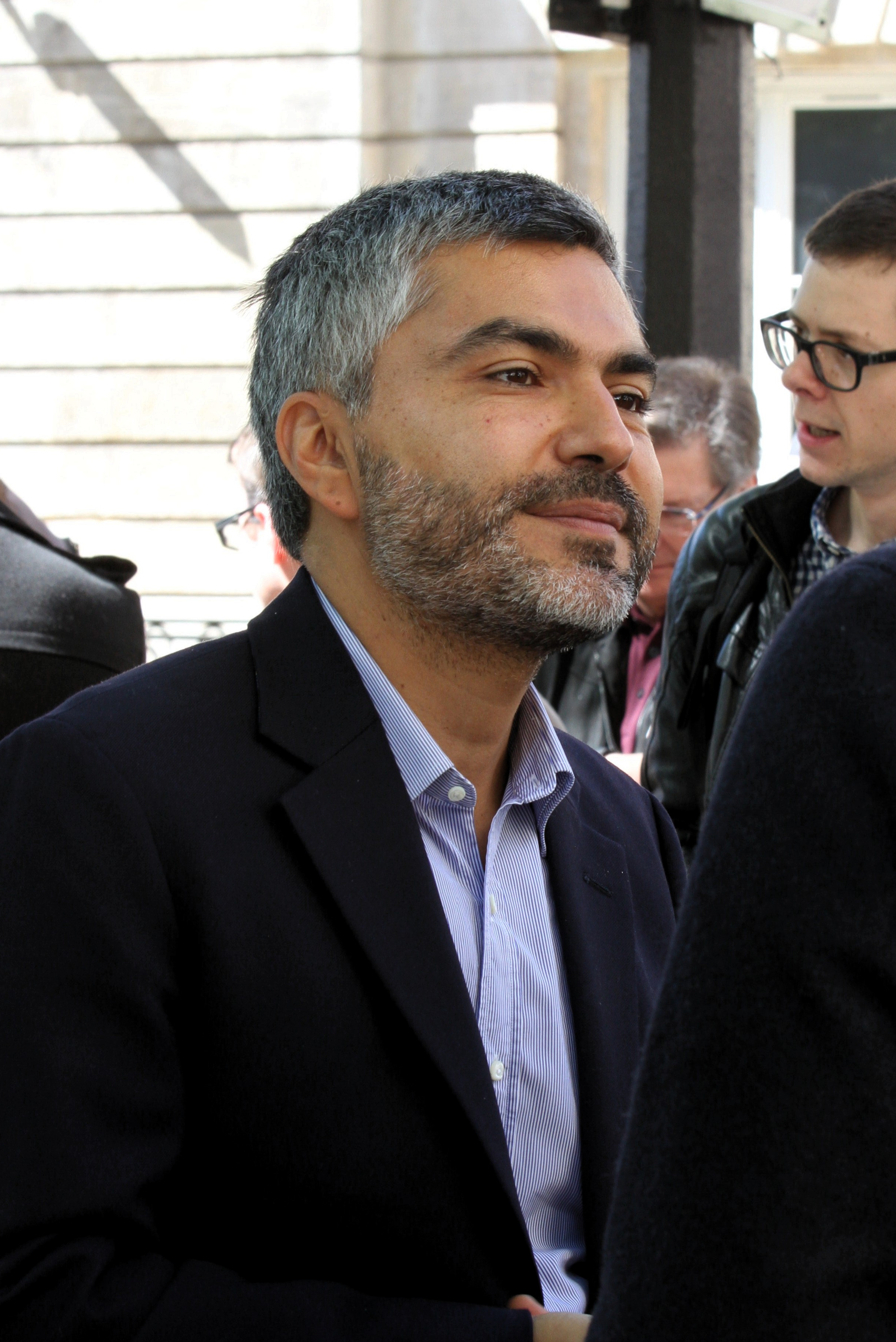
Sergio Coronado

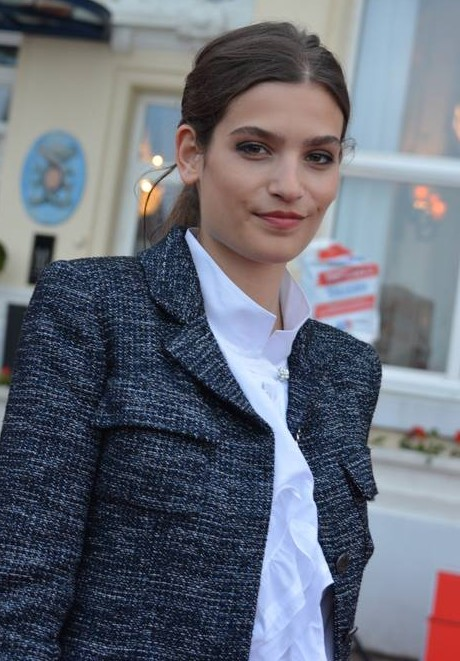
Alma Jodorowsky

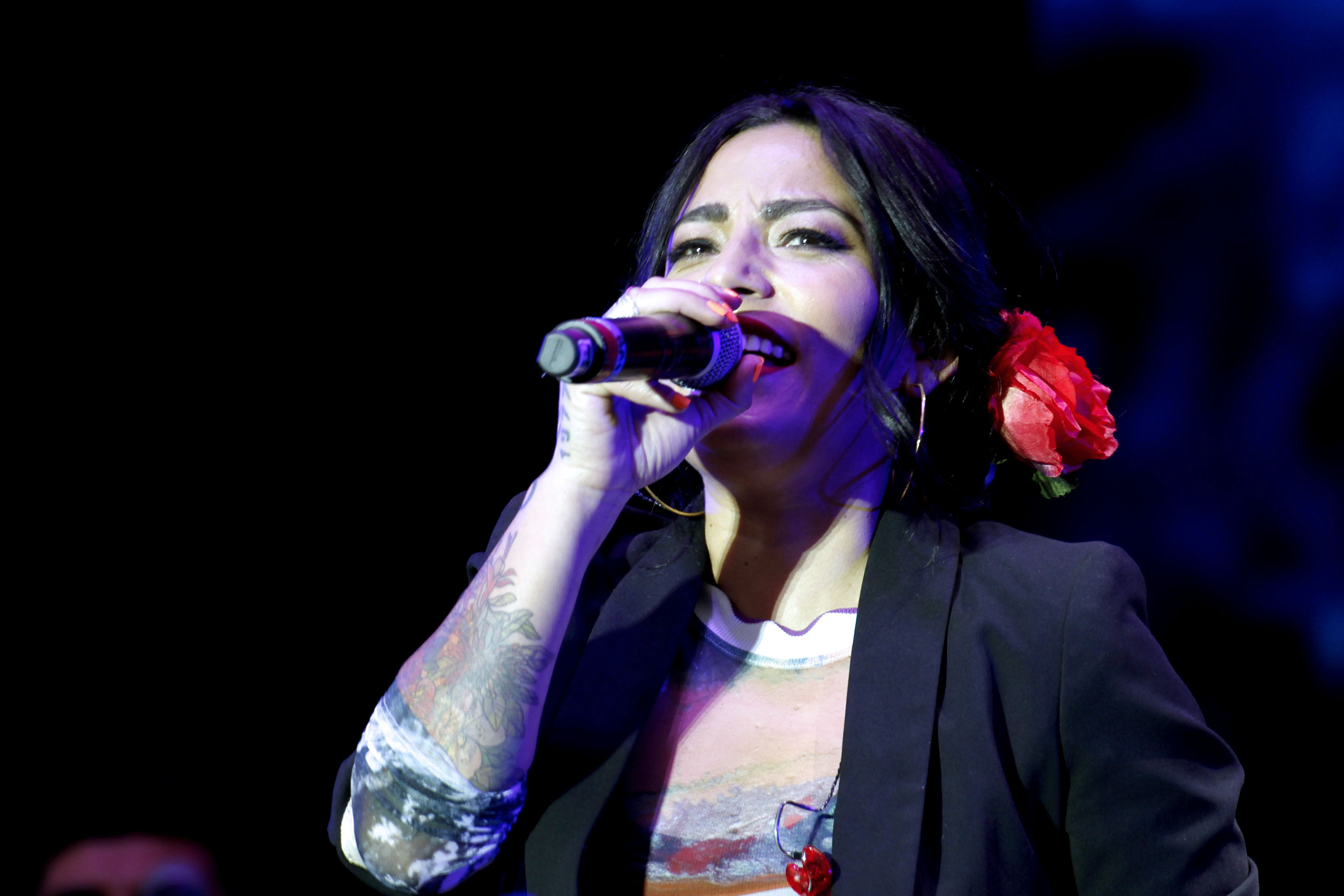
Ana Tijoux

== See also ==
- Chile–France relations
- French Chileans
- Chilean diaspora
- Immigration to France
