= Institute for Agricultural Development =

The Institute for Agricultural Development or INDAP (Spanish: Instituto de Desarrollo Agropecuario) is a department at the Ministry of Agriculture aimed at improving soil cultivation, livestock, crop production and farming in general. From 1965 to 1968, in the middle of the Chilean land reform, Jacques Chonchol headed the institution. During this time INDAP went from being a technical agency to a peasant league.
