= Alberto Jerez Horta =

Chilean politician (1927–2023)

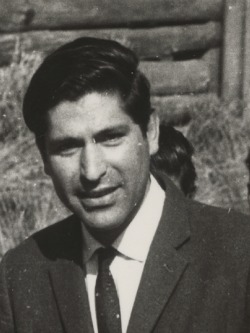

Member of the Senate of Chile
- In office 15 May 1969 – 21 September 1973

Member of the Chamber of Deputies of Chile
- In office 15 May 1961 – 15 May 1969

Personal details
- Born: Alberto Jorge Jerez Horta; 2 July 1927 Santiago, Chile
- Died: 18 October 2023 (aged 96)
- Party: FN (1945–1957); PDC (1957–1969, 1983–2023); MAPU (1969–1971); IC (1971–1976)
- Education: University of Chile
- Occupation: Lawyer

Alberto Jorge Jerez Horta (2 July 1927 – 18 October 2023) was a Chilean lawyer and politician. A member of the Christian Democratic Party, he served in the Chamber of Deputies from 1961 to 1969 and the Senate from 1969 to 1973.

Jerez died on 18 October 2023, at the age of 96.
