= Jacques Chonchol =

Chilean professor, author, and politician (1926–2023)

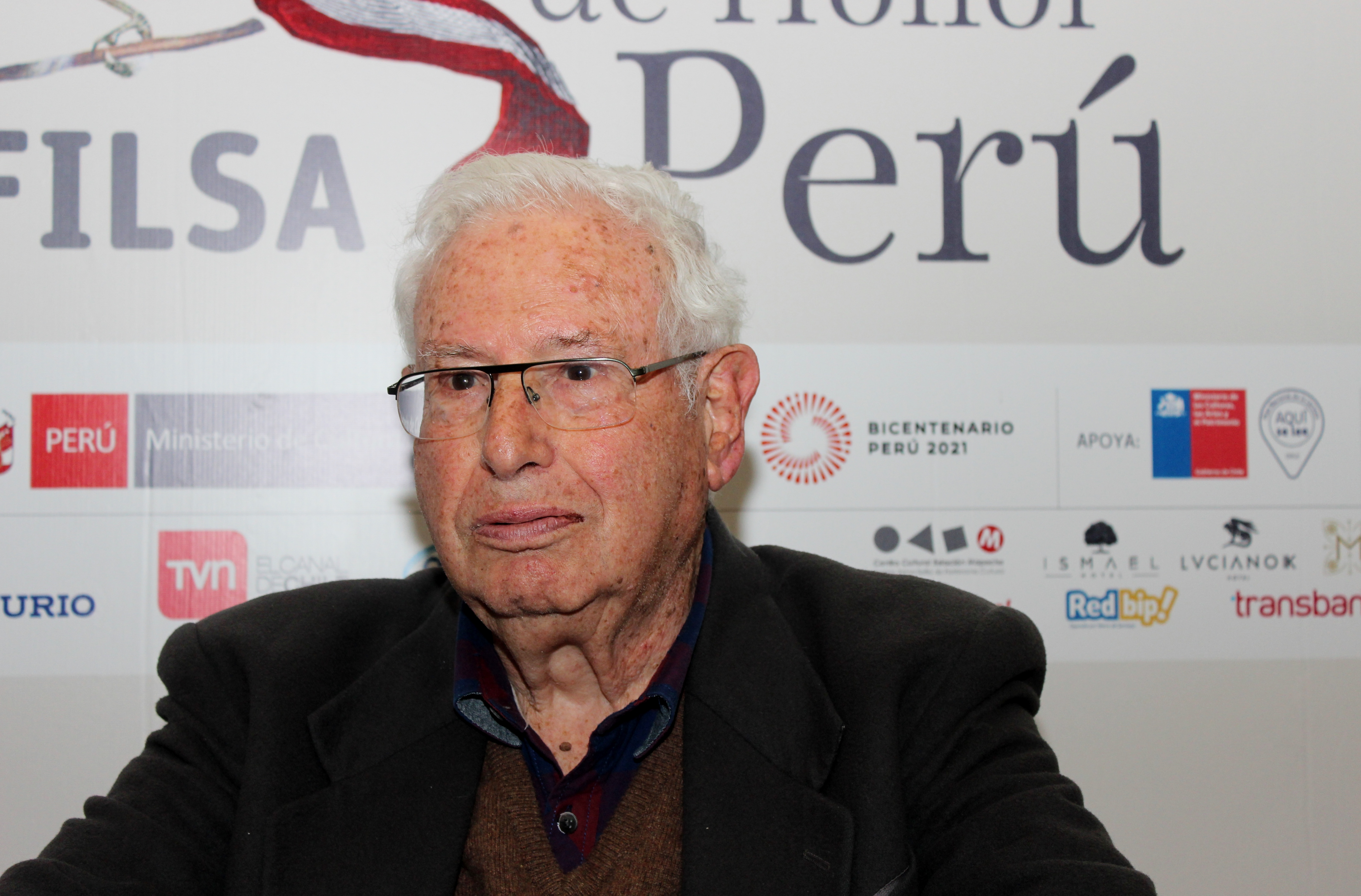

Minister of Agriculture
- In office 3 November 1970 – 2 November 1972
- President: Salvador Allende
- Preceded by: Hugo Trivelli
- Succeeded by: Rolando Calderón

Jacques Chonchol (26 March 1926 – 5 October 2023) was a Chilean politician and professor known for his work in the land reform movement during the 1960s and early 1970s. Chonchol served from 1970 to 1972 as Minister of Agriculture in the government of President Salvador Allende. He took refuge in a foreign embassy during the coup and was allowed to leave Chile for Venezuela. He then moved to France, but returned to Chile in 1994. He was director of the Institute for Advanced Latin American Studies, in Paris, between 1982 and 1993.

== Land reform ==
In 1965, in the middle of the Chilean land reform, President Eduardo Frei Montalva appointed him to head the Institute for Agricultural Development (INDAP). Cholchol allowed the transformation of the institution from a technical agency to a "peasant league". Still, unhappy with the land reform not going fast enough he left INDAP in 1968 and in 1969 he became a founding member of Popular Unitary Action Movement (MAPU). In 1970 he was appointed by President Salvador Allende to be Minister of Agriculture, a position he held until 1972.

Interviews conducted with him in 2013 and 2014 were published in 2016.

== Death ==
Jacques Chonchol died on 5 October 2023, at the age of 97.

== Books ==
- Paysans a venir: Les societes rurales du Tiers Monde, French edition published by La Découverte (1986)
- Por una nueva Reforma Agraria para Chile (2021)
