= Manuel Jacques =

Chilean lawyer, academic and politician

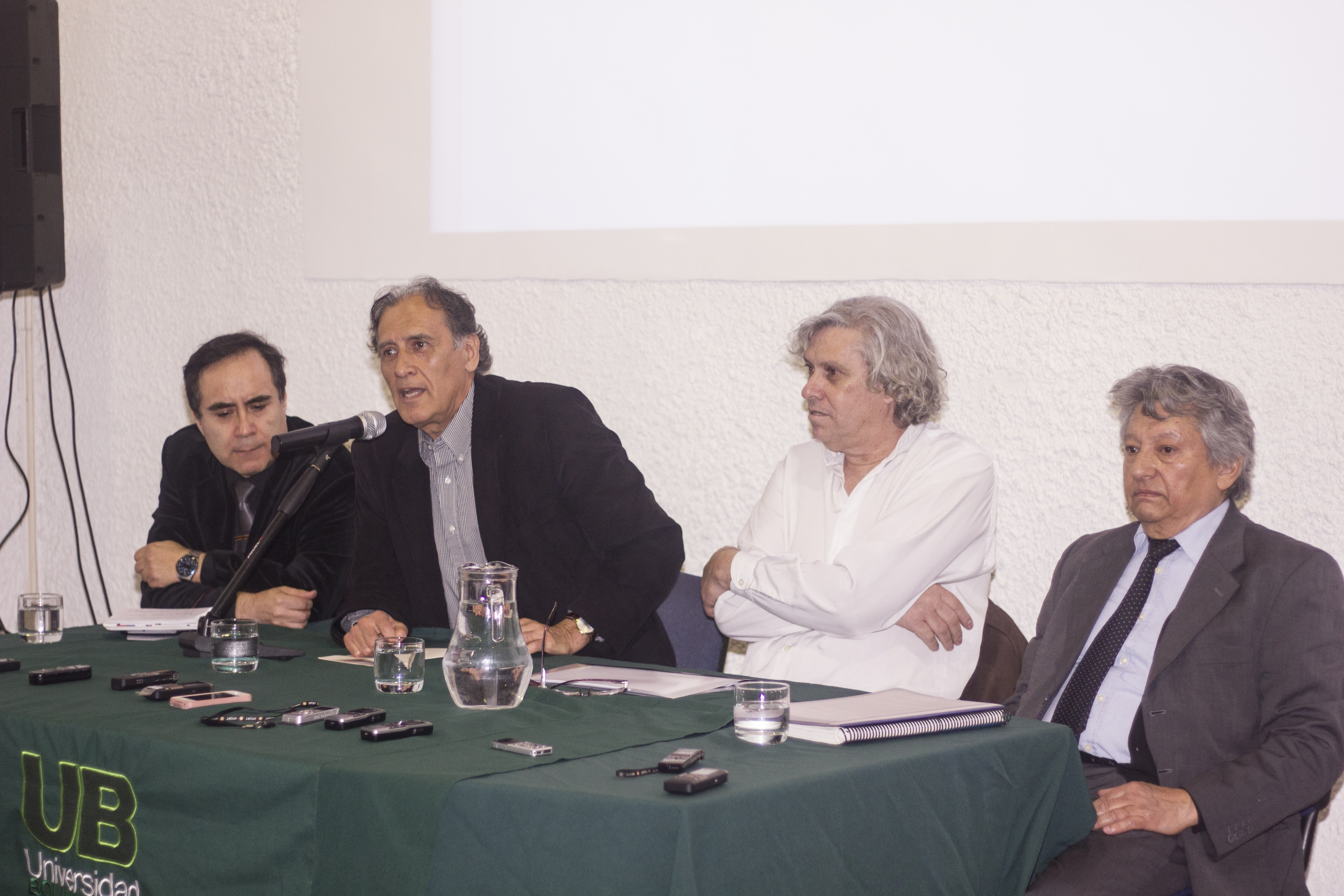
Manuel Jacques, Francisco Estevez, and Carlos Lopez Dawson

Manuel Jacques Parraguez, is a Chilean lawyer, academic and politician. He is President of the Izquierda Cristiana (Christian Left Party of Chile) and a professor at the Universidad Bolivariana de Chile.

For the 2005 Chilean presidential election he competed in the primary election for the Juntos Podemos Más electoral pact. The pact was ultimately represented by Tomás Hirsch, who won around 5% of the vote.
