= Julio Silva Solar =

Chilean politician and lawyer

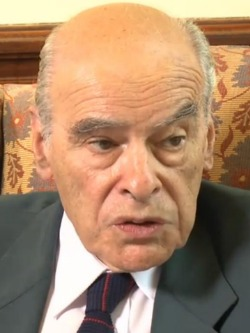
Solar in December 2013

Julio Silva Solar (8 June 1926 – 28 June 2014) was a Chilean politician and lawyer. Solar served as a member of the Chamber of Deputies of Chile from 1965 to 1973. He then served as President of the Chamber of Deputies of Chile from 9 September 1969 to 16 September 1969.

Solar died in Santiago, Chile from a heart attack, aged 88.
