= MAPU Obrero Campesino =

MAPU Worker-Peasant MAPU Obrero Campesino
- Founded: March 1973
- Dissolved: April 1989
- Split from: Popular Unitary Action Movement
- Headquarters: Santiago de Chile
- Ideology: Revolutionary socialism Christian socialism Factions: Marxism-Leninism
- Political position: Left-wing; Factions: Far-left

The MAPU Obrero Campesino (Spanish abbr. MAPU/OC; MAPU Worker-Peasant) was a leftist political party in Chile that was formed after a split of MAPU in March 1973. It claimed to represent the political legacy of Rodrigo Ambrosio, the principal founder of the original MAPU, who had died in May 1972.

The MAPU/OC aimed at forming a "third proletarian party" in Chile, supporting cooperation with the Communist Party of Chile and the Socialist Party. It adhered to the more “moderate”, legalistic tendency of Unidad Popular, like the Communist Party and Radicals. It regarded the formation of the government of Salvador Allende as the principal victory for people and democracy and distanced itself from more extremist left-wing groups like MIR.

It had two ministers in Allende's government (Fernando Flores and Juan Carlos Concha) and a number of other state functionaries were among its ranks.

The MAPU/OC proclaimed that "the Chilean revolution was going through a national democratic phase" and established formal relations with the CPSU and other governing communist parties of the socialist bloc. It also supported the factions that sought a political compromise with the Chilean army and the Christian Democrats.

After the 11 September 1973 coup, the party started to pursue clandestine activities. Its line was to form an alliance of all democratic forces that opposed the dictatorship. The party was more popular among the intellectuals (Tomás Moulián, José Joaquin Bruner, Augusto Varas), university students (who in 1976 founded the Unión de Jóvenes Democráticos) and peasants (the leaders of the Confederación Unidad Obrero Campesina).

At the beginning of the 1980s, the party experienced internal ideological conflicts (between “Marxists-Leninists” and “Marxists-Renovators”).

== See also ==
- Politics of Chile
- Unidad Popular
