= List of Members of the Constitutional Council (Chile, 2023) =

This is the list of the 51 constituents of the 2023 Constitutional Council.

== List ==
Constituency	Region	Constituent	Name	Political Group	Party	Prior Public Office/Position	Education	Assumed office	Term Expires
I	Arica and Parinacota		Diego Vargas Castillo	–	PRep	No previous public office	University of Tarapacá	7 June 2023	7 November 2023
I	Arica and Parinacota		Jocelyn Ormeño	Democratic Socialism	Ind. PS	No previous office	University of Tarapacá	7 June 2023	7 November 2023
II	Tarapacá		Ninoska Payauna	–	PRep	No previous public office	Universidad del Mar	7 June 2023	7 November 2023
II	Tarapacá		Sebastián Parraguez	–	PRep	No previous public office	Universidad Santo Tomás	7 June 2023	7 November 2023
III	Antofagasta		Carlos Solar	–	PRep	No previous public office	University of Chile	7 June 2023	7 November 2023
III	Antofagasta		Carmen Montoya	–	PRep	No previous public office	–	7 June 2023	7 November 2023
III	Antofagasta		José Antonio González Pizarro	Frente Amplio	Ind. RD	No previous public office	Catholic University of the North; University of Navarra (PhD)	7 June 2023	7 November 2023
IV	Atacama		Marcela Araya	Democratic Socialism	PS	No previous public office	–	7 June 2023	7 November 2023
IV	Atacama		Paul Sfeir	–	PRep	No previous public office	Simón Bolívar University, Venezuela; Andres Bello Catholic University; Central University of Venezuela	7 June 2023	7 November 2023
V	Coquimbo		Fernando Viveros	Apruebo Dignidad	PC	No previous public office	Latin American School of Medicine in Cuba	7 June 2023	7 November 2023
V	Coquimbo		Gloria Paredes	–	PRep	No previous public office	Bolivarian University of Chile; University of the Andes (Pg.D)	7 June 2023	7 November 2023
V	Coquimbo		Ivon Guerra	Chile Vamos	UDI	No previous public office	ARCIS University	7 June 2023	7 November 2023
VI	Valparaíso		Antonio Barchiesi	–	PRep	No previous public office	Pontifical Catholic University of Chile	7 June 2023	7 November 2023
VI	Valparaíso		María de los Ángeles López	–	PRep	No previous public office	Adolfo Ibanez University	7 June 2023	7 November 2023
VI	Valparaíso		María Pardo	Apruebo Dignidad	CS	No previous public office	Pontifical Catholic University of Valparaíso	7 June 2023	7 November 2023
VI	Valparaíso		Aldo Valle	Socialismo Democrático	PS	Head of the University of Valparaíso	University of Chile	7 June 2023	7 November 2023
VI	Valparaíso		Edmundo Eluchans	Chile Vamos	UDI	Head of the Chamber of Deputies	Pontifical Catholic University of Chile	7 June 2023	7 November 2023
VII	Santiago Metropolitan		Karen Araya Rojas	Apruebo Dignidad	PC	No previous public office	Universidad Católica Silva Henríquez	7 June 2023	7 November 2023
VII	Santiago Metropolitan		Yerko Ljubetic	Apruebo Dignidad	CS	Minister of Labor and Social Provision	University of Chile	7 June 2023	7 November 2023
VII	Santiago Metropolitan		Luis Silva Irarrázaval	–	PRep	No previous public office	Pontifical Catholic University of Chile	7 June 2023	7 November 2023
VII	Santiago Metropolitan		Jorge Ossandón	–	PRep	No previous public office	University of the Andes, Chile Pontifical Catholic University of Chile	7 June 2023	7 November 2023
VII	Santiago Metropolitan		Gloria Hutt	Chile Vamos	EVO	Minister of Transportation and Telecommunications	Pontifical Catholic University of Chile	7 June 2023	7 November 2023
VIII	O'Higgins Region		Sebastián Figueroa	–	PRep	No previous public office	Pontifical Catholic University of Chile	7 June 2023	7 November 2023
VIII	O'Higgins Region		Miguel Littin	Socialismo Democrático	PS	No previous experience	University of Chile	7 June 2023	7 November 2023
VIII	O'Higgins Region		Ivonne Mangelsdorff	Chile Vamos	RN	No previous experience	University for Development; Andrés Bello National University	7 June 2023	7 November 2023
IX	Maule Region		Ricardo Ortega Perrier	–	PRep	Commander-in-chief of the Chilean Air Force	Captain Manuel Ávalos Prado Aviation School; Pontifical Catholic University of Chile (Lic.); University of Chile (MA); Gabriela Mistral University (MBA)	7 June 2023	7 November 2023
IX	Maule Region		Miguel Rojas Soto	–	PRep	No previous public office	Catholic University of the Maule	7 June 2023	7 November 2023
IX	Maule Region		María Gatica Gajardo	–	PRep	No previous public office	–	7 June 2023	7 November 2023
IX	Maule Region		María Claudia Jorquera	Chile Vamos	UDI	No previous public office	Autonomous University of Chile; University of Talca (MA)	7 June 2023	7 November 2023
IX	Maule Region		Christian Suárez Crothers	Socialismo Democrático	Ind. PS	Intendant of the Maule Region	University of Chile (LL.B); Complutense University of Madrid (Ph.D)	7 June 2023	7 November 2023
XVI	Ñuble Region		Cecilia Medina Meneses	–	PRep	No previous public office	–	7 June 2023	7 November 2023
XVI	Ñuble Region		Carolina Navarrete	Chile Vamos	UDI	No previous public office	University of Concepción	7 June 2023	7 November 2023
X	Bío Bío Region		Patricia Spoerer	–	PRep	No previous public office	University of Concepción	7 June 2023	7 November 2023
X	Bío Bío Region		Aldo Sanhueza	–	PRep	No previous public office	Andres Bello National University	7 June 2023	7 November 2023
XI	Araucanía Region		Héctor Urban	–	PRep	No previous public office	–	7 June 2023	7 November 2023
XI	Araucanía Region		Mariela Fincheira	–	PRep	No previous public office	Universidad Santo Tomás	7 June 2023	7 November 2023
XI	Araucanía Region		Arturo Phillips	Chile Vamos	UDI	No previous public office	Pontifical Catholic University of Chile	7 June 2023	7 November 2023
XI	Araucanía Region		Germán Becker Alvear	Chile Vamos	RN	No previous public office	University of Chile	7 June 2023	7 November 2023
XI	Araucanía Region		Kinturay Melín	Apruebo Dignidad	RD	No previous public office	–	7 June 2023	7 November 2023
XII	Los Lagos Region		Jorge de la Maza	–	PRep	No previous public office	Universidad Santo Tomás	7 June 2023	7 November 2023
XII	Los Lagos Region		Lorena Gallardo	Chile Vamos	Ind. RN	No previous public office	–	7 June 2023	7 November 2023
XII	Los Lagos Region		Alejandro Kohler	Socialismo Democrático	Ind. PS	Mayor of Panguipulli	Universidad Técnica del Estado	7 June 2023	7 November 2023
XIII	Los Lagos Region		Beatriz Hevia	–	PRep	No previous public office	University of the Andes, Chile	7 June 2023	7 November 2023
XIII	Los Lagos Region		Carlos Recondo	Chile Vamos	UDI	Member of the Chamber of Deputies of Chile	Austral University of Chile	7 June 2023	7 November 2023
XIII	Los Lagos Region		Nancy Márquez	Apruebo Dignidad	CS	No previous public office	Temuco Catholic University; Alberto Hurtado University	7 June 2023	7 November 2023
XIV	Aysen Region		Pilar Cuevas	Chile Vamos	RN	Intendant of the Aysen Region	University of Concepción	7 June 2023	7 November 2023
XIV	Aysen Region		Julio Ñanco	Apruebo Dignidad	RD	No previous public office	ARCIS University; University of the Bío Bío (MA)	7 June 2023	7 November 2023
XV	Magallanes Region		Claudia Mac-Lean	–	PRep	No previous public office	University of Chile (Lic.); Cambridge University (MA)	7 June 2023	7 November 2023
XV	Magallanes Region		Jessica Bengoa	Apruebo Dignidad	CS	No previous public office	University of Magallanes	7 June 2023	7 November 2023

== See also ==
- Constitutional Council (Chile)
