= Julio Ñanco =

Chilean constituent

Member of the Constitutional Council
- In office 7 June 2023 – 7 November 2023
- Constituency: Aysén Region

Personal details
- Born: 5 August 1977 (age 49) Santiago, Chile
- Party: Democratic Revolution (RD)
- Education: ARCIS University; University of the Bío Bío (MA)
- Profession: Architecture

Julio Francisco Ñanco Antilef (born 5 August 1977) is a Chilean politician who served in the Constitutional Council.

== Biography ==
Julio Francisco Ñanco Antilef was born on 5 August 1977 in Santiago. He is the son of Julio Ñanco Calfuñir and Orfelina Alicia Antilef Antilef. He is of Mapuche descent. He is married to Natacha Pot and is the father of a son named Sayén.

Ñanco completed his secondary education at the Colegio Politécnico Avenida Independencia in Santiago, graduating in 1994.

He studied architecture at the now-closed ARCIS University. He holds a master’s degree in Wood Construction from the University of Bío-Bío. He has completed several postgraduate diplomas in areas including regional management, indigenous peoples, public security, history and politics, and administrative and urban law. Ñanco has spent much of his professional career in the public sector, working in the Municipality of O'Higgins and within the Aysén Region.

== Political career ==
He has served as a leader within the Association of Officials of the National Institute of Sports (IND) and the Aysén Regional Government. He is also a member of the Indigenous Association Rakiduantum of Coyhaique.

Ñanco was a candidate for the Constitutional Convention and for the Chamber of Deputies of Chile in the 2021 parliamentary elections in the Aysén Region, but was not elected in either contest.

In the elections held on 7 May 2023, he ran as a candidate for the Constitutional Convention representing the 14th electoral district of the Aysén Region, as a member of the Democratic Revolution (RD) party within the Unidad para Chile electoral pact. According to the Electoral Court of Chile (TRICEL), he was elected with 3,908 votes.

=== Constitutional Council ===
Ñanco took office as a member of the Constitutional Council on 7 June 2023. Within the Council, he served on the Commission on Political System, Constitutional Reform, and Form of the State.
