= Mangelsdorff =

Mangelsdorff is a German surname. Notable people with the surname include:

- Albert Mangelsdorff (1928–2005), German jazz trombonist
- Emil Mangelsdorff (1925–2022), German jazz saxophonist, clarinetist and flautist
- Ivonne Mangelsdorff (born 1975), Chilean politician

== See also ==
- Mangelsdorf
