= Miguel Rojas Soto =

Chilean constituent (born 1998)

Member of the Constitutional Council
- In office 7 June 2023 – 7 November 2023
- Constituency: Maule Region

Personal details
- Born: 13 October 1998 (age 27) Santiago, Chile
- Party: Republican Party
- Children: Two
- Parent(s): Miguel Ángel Rojas; Makarena Soto
- Education: Catholic University of the Maule; University of Barcelona (M.D.)
- Profession: Public Administrator

Miguel Rojas Soto (born 13 October 1998) is a Chilean politician who served in the Constitutional Council.

== Biography ==
Rojas was born in Santiago on 13 October 1998. He is the son of Miguel Ángel Rojas and Makarena Soto Medina.

He completed his primary and secondary education at Colegio Amelia Troncoso in Linares, graduating in 2016. In 2018, he enrolled in the Public Administration program at the Catholic University of the Maule (UCM), obtaining his professional degree in 2023. Between 2018 and 2020, he served as an academic tutor at the Learning Support Center (CAP UCM), part of the Academic Vice-Rectorate and Teaching Directorate of the UCM.

From 11 March 2022 to 7 May 2023, Rojas worked as chief of staff to Deputy Benjamín Moreno Bascur. Between 2024 and 2025, he completed a Master’s degree in Advanced Public Management at the Faculty of Law of the University of Barcelona, Spain.

== Political career ==
During his university years, Rojas held several student leadership positions. Between 2018 and 2019, he served as vice-president and secretary of his university’s student council, and in 2019 he was a senior councillor of the student federation at the Universidad Católica del Maule.

He is a member of the Republican Party of Chile. Since 2023, he has served as vice-president of the party in the Maule Region and previously held the position of president of its youth organization.

In the elections held on 7 May 2023, Rojas ran as a candidate for the Constitutional Council representing the Republican Party for the 9th Circumscription of the Maule Region. He was elected with 59,130 votes.
