= Oscar Gacitúa González =

Chilean painter

Óscar Gacitúa González
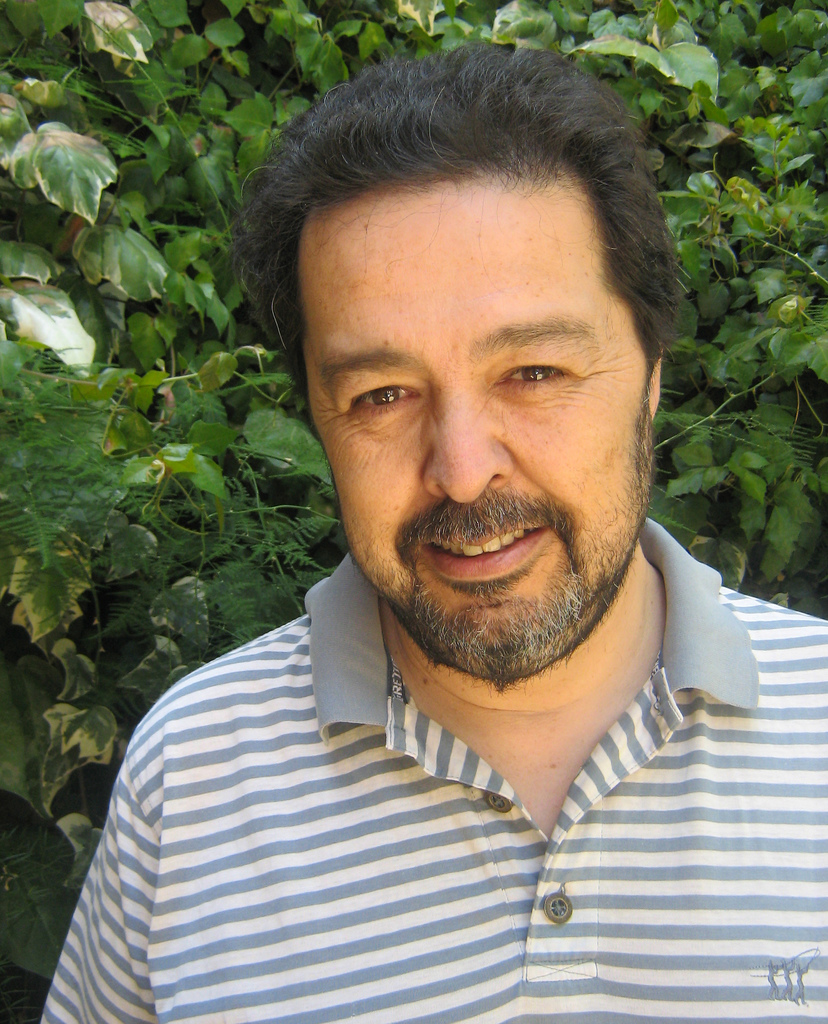

Personal details
- Born: 2 June 1953 (age 73) Santiago, Chile
- Spouse: Paz González (divorced)
- Parent: Oscar Gacitúa Weston
- Relatives: Rebecca and Roberto (brothers)
- Education: Trewhela's School
- Alma mater: University of Chile (no degree; 1970−71); Pontifical Catholic University of Valparaíso (B.A. in Architecture; 1972−1975); University of the Bío Bío (M.A. in Architecture; 1976−1977)

Óscar Roberto Gacitúa González (born 2 June 1953) is a Chilean painter.

== Biography ==
Son of the Chilean pianist Oscar Gacitúa Weston, Gacitúa was born in Santiago de Chile once his father returned to that country after having studied in the United States. By the other hand, his brother Roberto is also a painter.

From 1971 to 1972 he studied at the Pontifical Catholic University of Valparaíso School of Art. Then, from 1973 to 1976, he studied architecture at the same university. Later he worked in the Casa Mrksa piano workshop.

Since 1980 he has regularly exhibited his pictorial work in galleries and museums in Chile and abroad. His work is in the permanent collections of the main national museums of different countries.

In 2001, and according his sister Rebecca, he tried unsuccessfully to convince his father not to commit suicide in December 2001.

== Expositions ==
- 1980: Galería Época, at Santiago, Chile
- 1982: Museo de Arte Assis Chateaubriand, at São Paulo.
- 1982: Galería del Cerro, Santiago
- 1983: Galería de La Plaza, Santiago
- 1983: Cabaret Lord Jim, Hotel Galerías Nacionales, Santiago
- 1983: Galería Época, Santiago
- 1984: Galería La Granola, at Viña del Mar (Chile).
- 1985: Galería Universitaria, at Concepción (Chile).
- 1985: Gacitúa, Instituto Cultural de Las Condes, at Santiago
- 1985: Sala Universidad de Concepción, at Concepción (Chile).
- 1985: Instituto Cultural de Las Condes, at Santiago.
- 1986: Galería La Fachada, at Santiago.
- 1986: La Polar-Oid, Galería Plástica 3, at Santiago.
- 1989: Instituto Chileno-Norteamericano, at Concepción, Chile.
- 1990: Galería de Arte Actual, at Santiago.
- 1995: Un Volcán de Pasiones, Sala Telefónica del Sur, Puerto Montt and Sala Viña del Mar, at Vina del Mar.
- 2007: Agua Destilada, Galería Cecilia Palma, en Santiago.

== Collective exhibitions ==
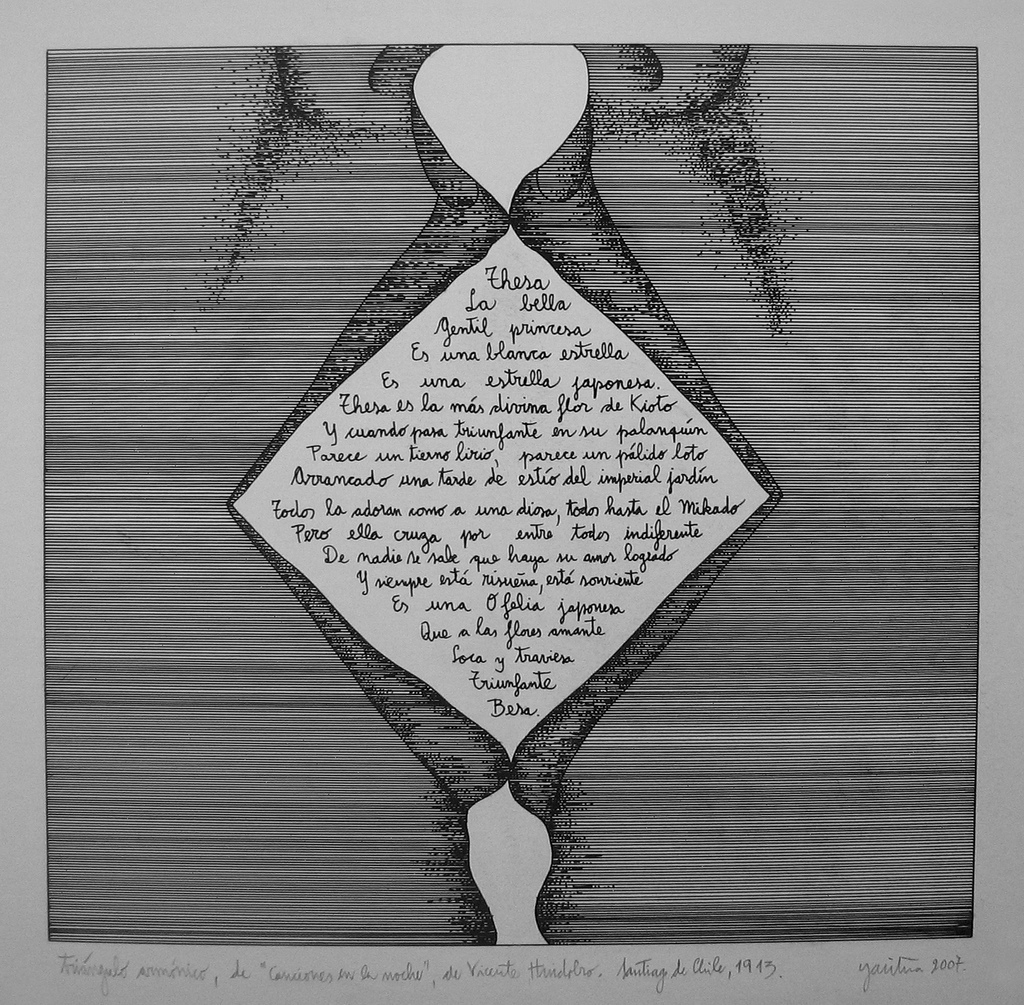
Gacitúa's Picture Triángulo armónico (2007); based in the poem Canciones en la noche (1913) of Vicente Huidobro (1893−1948).

- 1977: III Bienal Internacional de Arte de Valparaíso, Museo Municipal de Bellas Artes, Valparaíso (Chile).
- 1979: Primer Encuentro de Arte Joven, Instituto Cultural de Las Condes, Santiago.
- 1979: Tercer Concurso Colocadora Nacional de Valores, Museo Nacional de Bellas Artes, Santiago.
- 1980: II Encuentro de Arte Joven, Instituto Cultural de Las Condes, Santiago.
- 1981: II Bienal de Arte Universitario, Universidad Católica, Museo Nacional de Bellas Artes, Santiago.
- 1981: Tercer Encuentro de Arte Joven, Instituto Cultural de Las Condes, Santiago.
- 1982: Certamen Nacional de Artes Plásticas, Museo de Arte Contemporáneo, Universidad de Chile, Santiago.
- 1982: Exposición de G. Arestizábal y O. Gacitúa, Universidad Técnica Federico Santa María, Valparaíso.
- 1982: Dibujos y pinturas de Germán Arestizábal, Oscar Gacitúa, Sala de Exposiciones Amigos del Arte, Santiago.
- 1983: Chile - Chile, Cayman Gallery, New York.
- 1983: Chistes de Nicanor Parra, Galería Época, Santiago.
- 1983: Nos duele, Tideh.
- 1983: Seis Dedos para una Mano, Galería de la Plaza, Santiago.
- 1983: Ahora Chile, Galería Bucci, Santiago.
- 1983: Artes Industrias de la Supervivencia, Galería Época, Santiago.
- 1983: Primera Bienal de Grabado en Uruguay, Museo de Arte Contemporáneo, Montevideo (Uruguay).
- 1983: 50 Años de Plástica en Chile, Instituto Cultural de Las Condes, Santiago.
- 1984: Autorretrato, Galería Sur, Santiago.
- 1984: Gacitúa, González, Galería Plástica 3, Santiago.
- 1984: Sueños de Gloria, Galería Plástica 3, Santiago.
- 1985: FestivaL Bellavista, Santiago.
- 1985: Gráfica Xerox, Instituto Cultural de Las Condes, Santiago.
- 1985: Galería Universitaria, en Talca (Chile).
- 1985: Seis Artistas Chilenos, Galería 3 Piso, La Paz (Bolivia).
- 1986: Casa Matucana, El 19, Santiago.
- 1990: Museo de Arte Moderno, Castro, Chiloé (Chile).
- 1991: Cuerpos Pintados, Museo Nacional de Bellas Artes, Santiago.
- 1992: Exposición Colectiva, Sala de la Parroquia de Frutillar, X Region of Chile.
- 1992: Cama, Galería Plástica Nueva San Francisco, Santiago.
- 1993: Marina Dalla - Venezia y Oscar Gacitúa, Galería Plástica Nueva San Francisco, Santiago.
- 1994: Chile Artes Visuales Hoy, Colección Museo Chileno de Arte Moderno, Salas Nacionales de Cultura Embajada de Chile, Buenos Aires (Argentina).
- 1995: Primer Salón Nacional del Arte de la Acuarela Ricardo Anwanter V.S.S., Centro Cultural Austral, Valdivia (Chile).
- 1996: VI Concurso Nacional de Pintura El Color del Sur, Municipalidad de Puerto Varas (Chile).
- 1996: Muestra Colectiva del Museo Chileno de Arte Moderno, ILLA (Instituto Ítalo-latinoamericano), Rome, Italy.
- 1997: Dibujos de Germán Arestizábal y Oscar Gacitúa, Galería ArteEspacio, Santiago.
- 1997: Pintura, Grabado y Escultura, Galería de Arte Bosque Nativo (at Puerto Montt), Centro Cultural El Austral (en Valdivia) and in the Centro de Convenciones de Puerto Varas (Chile).

== Collections ==
- Museo Ralli (Santiago de Chile)
- Museo de Arte Moderno Chiloé
- Museo de Artes Visuales
