= Gloria Paredes =

Chilean constituent

Member of the Constitutional Council
- In office 7 June 2023 – 7 November 2023
- Constituency: Coquimbo Region

Personal details
- Born: 19 June 1965 (age 61) Iquique, Chile
- Party: Republican Party
- Children: One
- Parent(s): Tulio Paredes; María Díaz
- Education: Bolivarian University of Chile (LL.B); University of the Andes (Pg.D)
- Profession: Lawyer

Gloria Paredes Díaz (born 19 June 1965) is a Chilean lawyer and politician. She served in the Constitutional Council in 2023.

== Early life and education ==
Paredes was born in Iquique on 19 June 1965. Her parents are Tulio Paredes Díaz and Marta Estelvina Díaz Vilca.

She completed her secondary education at Liceo Elena Duvauchelle Cabezón in Iquique in 1982. She obtained her law degree from Bolivarian University of Chile.

Paredes holds a postgraduate diploma in Children’s Rights from Universidad de los Andes, completed in 2022, and has earned three postgraduate diplomas in criminal law from Universidad Central between 2018 and 2020.

== Career ==
Paredes has worked as a public official in several institutions, including the Regional Government of Tarapacá and Arturo Prat University in Iquique.

She is a member of the Republican Party and serves as secretary general of the party’s Coquimbo regional leadership. She is also involved in coordinating activities at the Chapel of Perpetual Adoration of Lourdes in La Serena.

In the 2021 municipal elections, she ran as a candidate for city councillor in La Serena but was not elected.

In the election held on 7 May 2023, Paredes ran as a Republican Party candidate for the Constitutional Council representing the 5th Constituency (Coquimbo Region). She was elected with 36,796 votes, becoming the most-voted candidate in the region.

Within the Constitutional Council, she served on the Commission on Jurisdictional Function and Autonomous Bodies.

Paredes has stated that, in her constitutional work, she supports the protection of life from conception to natural death, the family, and respect for human dignity, positions she has publicly associated with her Catholic beliefs.

== Personal life ==
Paredes is a single mother of one son, who is a qualified social worker.
