= María Pardo =

María Pardo may refer to:

- María Pardo (gymnast) (born 1979), Spanish rhythmic gymnast
- María Pardo (lawyer) (born 1988), Chilean lawyer
