= Program Mecesup =

The Higher Education Quality Improvement Program (MECESUP) in Chile is part of the efforts of the Government of Chile to support the transition from its current economy to one based on knowledge, increasing the equity and the effectiveness of its tertiary education system.

The objectives of the Program are to provide the necessary competencies and skills to improve the quality of the educational institutions and of the system of higher education, increasing its international competitiveness, sustaining social and economic development, and ensuring that no talent is lost because of differences in learning opportunities.

Specifically, the Program MECESUP - belonging to the Division of Higher Education at the Ministry of Education in Chile - provides incremental financing to projects and plans to improve institutional quality awarded by competitive means through the Academic Innovation Fund (AIF) or negotiated through Performance Agreements(PBA). Since its inception in 1999 and until April 2013, the Program MECESUP has been led by Dr. Ricardo Reich, chemical engineer, former professor and former Vice-President of Research of the Universidad de Concepción in Chile.

Since its initial implementation in 1999, MECESUP has counted with the sustained financial support of the State of Chile and the World Bank (Loans N°4404-CH, 7317-CH and 8126-CL), allocated 1,032 AIF projects (1999-2014), 4 pilot PBA (2007-2010), 6 PBA in the humanities, arts and social sciences (2010-2015) and 64 PBA in a scale-up that defined priority areas. Total resources allocated to the MECESUP Program during the period 1999-2015 were US$645 million. These resources were incremental to basal funding for the higher education institutions and amounted in average to 12% of the total. Additionally, US$155 million of State funding were allocated to implement PBA in science-based innovation and institutional development of regional institutions.

== History ==
In 1998, the Government of Chile agreed with the World Bank (loan N°4404-CH) the design and implementation of an ambitious program to improve the quality of higher education, which was baptized with the acronym MECESUP. In full expansion of college tuition, the program funded actions of academic improvement and infrastructure in the 25 universities of the Council of Rectors of Chilean universities (CRUCH), contributing to a significant increase in equity in the access to quality of students throughout the country.

The program MECESUP considered initially a capacity-building component, the design and implementation of an experimental process of voluntary accreditation of institutions and programs, and the creation of a Competitive Fund, which replaced the old Institutional Development Fund (with historical allocation). The committed investment for 5 years was US$245 million, with an average annual budget of US$50 million.

Eligible expenses considered the development of academic staff at the Ph.D. level and advanced training; modernisation of libraries and generation of study areas for students; management of information and knowledge; integration of information and communication technologies to the teaching-learning processes; new laboratory equipment; modern classrooms and use of multimedia; as well as fellowships for doctoral programs and research.

=== First Phase (1999-2005) ===
In the first phase of the MECESUP Program (loan 4404-CH)), the general assumption was that the investment in infrastructure would improve the academic teaching and student learning, and therefore graduate employability. Some dimensions that were taken into account to allocate resources, were the impact of the services provided to students; consistency with the institutional development plans; availability of human resources to implement the projects awarded; and financial and operational sustainability, among others.

The Competitive Fund, after 6 continuous years of competition calls, supported the deployment of nearly 400 projects, with averages of investment per institutional improvement plan of US$550,000. 70% of the resources were devoted to the improvement of undergraduate education in regional institutions. 20% Of the total budget was invested in the empowerment and development of the national Ph.D. programs. A 10% was allocated to the modernization of the centers of technical training (CFT) to improve teaching and learning in technology areas of interest to the productive sector.

In spite of the many and obvious achievements, the Competitive Fund, as the only mechanism for allocating resources for academic quality improvement, showed some limitations. One of them was the difficulty in supporting the solution of complex problems of an institutional nature, such as strategic planning, management improvement, monitoring of the impact of goals and results, and the employability of its graduates.

=== Second Phase (2006-2011) ===
As a result of the lessons learned during the implementation of the MECESUP Program, the Government decided in 2005 to begin a second phase (MECESUP2), agreeing with the World Bank a new loan (N° 7317-CH), and complementing the Competitive Fund - now called Academic Innovation Fund (AIF) - with the experimental (pilot) implementation of 4 performance agreements in accredited State universities: Tarapacá (in Arica), Chile (in Santiago), Bío-Bío (in Concepción) and La Frontera (in Temuco). There were also special resources assigned from the Chilean Bicentennial Program to 5 PBA in the areas of the humanities, arts and social sciences. The level of annual funding for all these activities was ensured by US$100 million.

=== Third Phase (2012-2016) ===
Considering the successful evaluation of the pilot in PBA, the new Government decided in 2011 to start a significant scaling-up phase (MECESUP3), this time by agreeing with the World Bank a third loan (N° 8126-CL) aimed at providing technical advice and ensuring an international quality audit to the institutional improvement plans awarded. Along with calls for PBA in the 2012-2015 period, it started the implementation of an enhanced version of the Academic Innovation Fund that includes some institutional negotiation to improve the improvement plans. The resources allocated during these two years amounting to USD$80 million.

After an initial institutional eligibility limited to CRUCH universities and accredited CFT, the MECESUP Program opened eligibility to all universities, technical training centers and professional institutes in Chile that were institutionally accredited by the National Accreditation Commission (Act 20.129).

== Mechanisms ==
=== The Academic Innovation Fund ===
The Academic Innovation Fund (AIF) is a financing instrument for the competitive allocation of State resources which encourage activities in eligible academic institutions of the Chilean tertiary education system with features of consistency, responsiveness, equity and quality. Its design is flexible, with specific objectives and thematic areas for priority actions in each competition call. Institutional proposals must be consistent with institutional strategic planning and designed for management by results. Assessment is achieved with national and foreign external peers that evaluate proposals. The evaluation and selection process is based on clear and transparent eligibility and selection criteria that assure equal opportunities and technical rigor. The resources allocated to the best proposals are transferred to the beneficiary institutions for its decentralized management. Academic innovation funds have been supported by the World Bank in several countries and are operationalised with projects that are implemented with management by results.

=== Performance Agreements ===
A Performance Agreement (PBA) is a contract between the State and a higher education institution which commit outstanding performances that involve a significant institutional improvement and which alone could not have been able to achieve. It is an institutional financing mechanism for allocating resources of advanced conceptual design and high strategic impact, which provides funding on the basis of results and allows institutions to generate transformative initiatives, capable of facing structural problems of different nature that can significantly improve their academic quality. For a system of higher education that has to face important challenges, the PBA offer relevant opportunities in the strengthening of organizational efforts and resources towards the achievement of outstanding outcomes, generation of competitive advantages and strategic positioning in functional or knowledge areas that can be improved and replicated in other institutions. Performance agreements consider an institutional plan of improvement, agreed between both parties, that is implemented with management by results and a monitoring and evaluation process based on indicators and performance.

=== Priority Areas of Investment ===
The performance agreements of the MECESUP program have been prioritised in the following thematic areas:

- Institutional priorities (Pilot phase)
- Improvement of the humanities, arts and social sciences
- Modernization of teacher training
- Modernization of the undergraduate curriculum based on competencies and learning outcomes (including the support of Ph.D. programs)
- Science-based innovation
- Quality improvement of regional institutions.
