= Bengoa =

Bengoa is a surname. Notable people with the surname include:

- Izaskun Bengoa Pérez (born 1975), Spanish road cyclist
- Jessica Bengoa Mayorga (born 1979), Chilean politician
- José Bengoa Cabello (1945–2026), Chilean historian and anthropologist
- Martín Bengoa Díez (born 1994), Spanish footballer
