= Parraguez =

Parraguez is a surname. Notable people with the surname include:

- Eduardo Parraguez (1935–2026), Chilean politician
- Gustavo Parraguez (born 1943), Chilean politician
- Ismael Parraguez (1883—1917), Chilean musician, teacher, poet, and novelist
- Javier Parraguez (born 1989), Chilean footballer
- Nelson Parraguez (born 1971), Chilean footballer
- Romina Parraguez (born 2000), Chilean football and futsal player
- Sebastián Parraguez (born 1987), Chilean politician
