= Ivon Guerra =

Chilean constituent

Member of the Constitutional Council
- In office 7 June 2023 – 7 November 2023
- Constituency: Coquimbo Region

Councillor of Monte Patria
- In office 6 December 2004 – 7 December 2008

Personal details
- Born: 8 October 1973 (age 52) El Salvador, Chile
- Party: Independent Democratic Union (UDI)
- Spouse: Carlos Araya
- Children: One
- Parent(s): Domingo Guerra; Gualda Aguilera
- Education: ARCIS University
- Profession: Journalist

Ivon Guerra Aguilera (born 8 October 1973) is a Chilean politician who served in the Constitutional Council.

== Biography ==
She was born in the mining settlement of El Salvador on 8 October 1973. Her parents are Domingo Guerra Fernández and Gualda de las Mercedes Aguilera Herrera. She is married to Carlos Araya Bugueño, mayor of Punitaqui, with whom she has one son, named after his father.

She completed her primary education at the rural School E-229 in the commune of Monte Patria. She obtained her secondary education certificate in 1990 at Liceo A-9 Alejandro Álvarez Jofré in Ovalle.

She earned a degree in journalism from ARCIS University.

== Political career ==
She served as a councillor of Monte Patria (2004–2008) and later as Regional Secretary (SEREMI) of Women and Gender Equality in the Coquimbo Region between 2018 and 2022.

After serving as a councillor, she worked as provincial coordinator (Limarí) of the Division of Social Organizations of the Regional Secretariat of Government of Coquimbo during Sebastián Piñera’s first presidential term. She was also part of the regional advisory team of former senator Evelyn Matthei.

She ran unsuccessfully for mayor of Monte Patria in 2016 and for the Chamber of Deputies in the Coquimbo Region in 2017.

In the elections held on 7 May 2023, she ran as a candidate for the Constitutional Council representing the 5th constituency (Coquimbo Region), as a member of the Independent Democratic Union (UDI) within the Chile Seguro electoral pact. According to the Electoral Court of Chile, she was elected with 21,681 votes.
