= Nancy Márquez =

Chilean politician

Member of the Constitutional Council
- In office 7 June 2023 – 7 November 2023
- Constituency: Los Lagos Region

Personal details
- Born: 15 February 1980 (age 46) Ancud, Chile
- Party: Social Convergence (CS)
- Education: Temuco Catholic University; Alberto Hurtado University
- Profession: Anthropologist

Nancy Márquez González (born 15 February 1980) is a Chilean politician who served in the Constitutional Council.

Márquez has professional experience in community-based work using participatory methodologies, the implementation of social programs, work with indigenous communities and children, and cultural management.

She has participated as a co-author in two books: My Friend Chilihueque and Other Indigenous Stories of the Chiloé Archipelago and The Smoke Houses: The Indigenous Past of Queilen in the Voices of Present-Day Communities.

== Biography ==
=== Family and early life ===
Nancy Márquez González was born in Ancud on 15 February 1980. She is the daughter of Hilda Nancy González Saldivia and Manuel Hugo Márquez Rojas.

=== Professional career ===
In 1989, she began her primary education at the rural school of Lliuco. In 1993, she enrolled at the Colegio Seminario Conciliar de Ancud, where she continued her primary education and later completed her secondary education.

In 2003, she obtained a degree in Sociocultural Anthropology from the Temuco Catholic University. She is currently a fourth-semester student in the master's program in Government, Public Policy, and Territory at the Alberto Hurtado University.

== Political career ==
She has been a member of Convergencia Social since 2021.

In 2021, she ran as a candidate for the Regional Council of Los Lagos representing the Province of Chiloé, competing as an independent candidate within the Chile Digno electoral pact. She obtained 1,831 votes, equivalent to 3.42% of the valid votes cast, and, although she was the top vote-getter on her party list, she was not elected.

In October 2022, she achieved the highest vote share on the most-voted list in her party's internal elections to form the Regional Directorate, becoming regional president of Convergencia Social in the Los Lagos Region.

In the elections held on 7 May 2023, Márquez ran as a candidate for the Constitutional Court representing the 13th electoral district of the Los Lagos Region, as a member of Convergencia Social within the Unidad para Chile electoral pact. According to the Electoral Qualification Court (TRICEL), she was elected with 36,127 votes.
