= Oscar Gacitúa Weston =

Chilean musician

Óscar Gacitúa Weston

Personal details
- Born: 16 August 1925 Talca, Chile
- Died: 5 December 2001 (aged 76) Las Condes, Chile
- Children: Three: Rebeca, Roberto and Oscar
- Occupation: Pianist

Óscar Gacitúa Weston (16 August 1925−5 December 2001) was a Chilean pianist.

His relationship with Claudio Arrau was decisive in his career as he was involved in his formation and got him a scholarship to study music in New York from 1950 to 1953. In that way, Gacitúa was also a disciple of Alberto Spikin during his time in New York.

== Biography ==
Born in Talca in 1925, Gacitúa began his musical training when he was five. At eight, he made his debut with the violinist Pedro Dandurain and then, when he was 12, he performed in Santiago with the Symphony Orchestra. It was at Arrau's arguing that the piano stopped being a hobby for him.

In the 1950s, Gacitúa received very a positive review in the US, which has support when The New York Times stated "Chile, that has already produced with Claudio Arrau a pianist of first magnitude, it seems to have another with Gacitúa." Similarly, he received offers to start an international career as a soloist. However, he chose to return to the country because he "preferred to settle in Chile and be a mouse head" as he said in an interview in 1990.

=== Death ===
On 5 December 2001, Gacitúa committed suicide at the Alcántara metro station of the Santiago Metro; he was 76 years old. According his daughter Rebeca, he suffered depression and his other son Óscar couldn't stop Gacitúa Weston's desire to die, so his decision was premeditated. One of the reasons of his depression was his old age, because he believed entering Alzheimer's disease despite having entirely organized a successful piano seasons or teach private piano lessons at his home in Providencia.
