= Carmen Montoya =

Chilean constituent

Member of the Constitutional Council
- In office 7 June 2023 – 7 November 2023
- Constituency: Antofagasta Region

Personal details
- Born: 16 July 1965 (age 60) Calama, Chile
- Party: Republican Party
- Occupation: Politician

Carmen Montoya Mayorga (born 16 July 1965) is a Chilean politician who served in the Constitutional Council.

== Biography ==
Montoya was born in Calama on 16 July 1965. She is the daughter of Zenon Montoya and Honorata Mayorga. She has identified as a Christian.

Montoya trained as a commercial engineer and has developed professional experience in the field of administration. She has worked in the retail sector for more than fifteen years, combining managerial functions with business operations and organizational development.

== Political career ==
In the elections held on 7 May 2023, Montoya ran as a candidate for the Constitutional Council representing the Republican Party of Chile for the 3rd Circumscription of the Antofagasta Region.

She was elected with 21,329 votes.
