= Jorge Ossandón =

Chilean constituent

Member of the Constitutional Council
- In office 7 June 2023 – 7 November 2023
- Constituency: Santiago Metropolitan Region

Personal details
- Born: 14 March 1985 (age 41) Santiago, Chile
- Party: Republican Party
- Spouse: María Paz Pimentel
- Children: Two
- Education: University of the Andes, Chile (LL.B); Pontifical Catholic University of Chile (LL.M)
- Occupation: Politician

Jorge Ossandón Spoerer (born 14 March 1985) is a Chilean politician who served in the Constitutional Council.

== Biography ==
Ossandón was born in Santiago on 14 March 1985. He is the son of Andrés Ossandón Gaete and María Patricia Spoerer Íñiguez. He is married to María Paz Pimentel Ascui and is the father of two children.

He completed his primary and secondary education at Colegio Tabancura, graduating in 2002. Between 2004 and 2009, he studied law at the Universidad de los Andes, Chile, and was admitted to the bar on 29 August 2012.

He later pursued postgraduate training in corporate, financial, and tax law, completing a diploma in Corporate Law and Financing at the Universidad de los Andes in 2014, additional professional courses at the School of Certified Public Accountants of Chile between 2016 and 2017, a diploma in Tax Analysis and Planning at the Pontifical Catholic University of Chile in 2019, and a Master’s degree in Tax Law at the same university in 2022.

== Professional career ==
In the legal field, Ossandón has specialized in tax law. Between January and December 2013, he worked as a lawyer in the legal department of Banco Santander Chile. From January 2014 to September 2015, he served as corporate lawyer at Romero & Asociados. Between October 2015 and January 2022, he worked as a tax lawyer at VGM Consultores.

From January to September 2022, he served as a tax lawyer at Araya & Cía. Abogados, and subsequently as legal advisor and tax law specialist at RAM Abogados.

== Political career ==
In 2020s, Ossandón joined the Republican Party of Chile and was involved with the political movement Acción Republicana.

In the elections held on 7 May 2023, he ran as a candidate for the Constitutional Council representing the Republican Party for the 7th Circumscription of the Metropolitan Region. He was elected with 218,376 votes.
