= Christian Suárez Crothers =

Chilean constituent

Christian Suárez

Member of the Constitutional Council
- In office 7 June 2023 – 7 November 2023
- Constituency: Maule Region

Intendant of the Maule Region
- In office 26 December 2001 – 16 December 2004
- Appointed by: Ricardo Lagos
- Preceded by: Norman Merchak
- Succeeded by: Jaime Hermosilla

Personal details
- Born: 15 April 1958 (age 68) Antofagasta, Chile
- Party: Christian Democratic Party (–2020)
- Children: Two
- Education: University of Chile (LL.B); Complutense University of Madrid (Ph.D)
- Occupation: Politician
- Profession: Lawyer

Christian Suárez Crothers (born 15 April 1958) is a Chilean politician who served in the Constitutional Council.

He holds a PhD in Law from the Complutense University of Madrid, awarded in 1998, where his doctoral dissertation—The Right to Informational Self-Determination as a New Constitutional Right—received the Extraordinary Doctoral Prize for best thesis.

He has been an associate professor for more than thirty years at the Faculty of Legal and Social Sciences of the University of Talca, teaching constitutional law at both undergraduate and graduate levels. He also served as Secretary General of the University of Talca during the rectorship of Álvaro Rojas Marín.

== Biography ==
=== Family and early life ===
Christian Suárez Crothers was born in Santiago on 15 April 1958. He is the son of Gabriel Suárez Astrain and Gladys Crothers Solar.

He is divorced and the father of two children.

=== Education and academic career ===
He completed his primary and secondary education at the public school of Licantén and at the Liceo Alemán del Verbo Divino in Los Ángeles.

He later enrolled in the Faculty of Law of the University of Chile, where he obtained a licentiate degree in Legal and Social Sciences in 1990. He was admitted to the bar on 1 October 1990.

In 1994, he completed a postgraduate diploma in International Human Rights Law at the International Institute René Cassin in France. The following year, he earned a postgraduate diploma in Constitutional Law and Political Science at the Centre for Political and Constitutional Studies (CEPC) in Spain.

In 1996, he completed a postgraduate diploma in International Human Rights Law jointly offered by Erasmus University Rotterdam and the Diego Portales University. In 1997, he completed a postgraduate diploma in University Pedagogy at the University of Talca.

== Political career ==
Suárez began his political activity as a student leader and was initially a member of the Christian Democratic Party. He later resigned from the party and continued his political career as an independent.

During the administration of President Patricio Aylwin (1990–1994), he served as Head of the State Modernization Division of the Subsecretariat for Regional Development and Administration (SUBDERE). He was later appointed Intendant of the Maule Region during the presidency of Ricardo Lagos, a position he held between 2001 and 2004.

In the 2005 parliamentary elections, he ran as a candidate for the Chamber of Deputies of Chile in District No. 37 of the Maule Region, representing the Christian Democratic Party within the Concertación Democrática coalition. He obtained 10,448 votes, equivalent to 12.47% of the valid votes cast, and was not elected.

Between 2010 and 2017, he served as an alternate justice of the Constitutional Court of Chile.

In the elections held on 7 May 2023, Suárez ran as a candidate for the Constitutional Council representing the 9th electoral district of the Maule Region, as an independent candidate on the list of the Socialist Party of Chile within the Unidad para Chile electoral pact. According to the Electoral Qualification Court (TRICEL), he was elected with 56,007 votes.
