= Mangelsdorf =

Mangelsdorf is a German surname. Notable people with the surname include:

- David Mangelsdorf (1958–2025), American biologist and chemist
- Paul Christoph Mangelsdorf (1899–1989) was an American botanist and agronomist
- Sarah C. Mangelsdorf (born 1958), American educator

== See also ==
- Mangelsdorff
