= Claudia Mac-Lean =

Chilean constituent

Member of the Constitutional Council
- In office 7 June 2023 – 7 November 2023
- Constituency: Magallanes Region

Personal details
- Born: 11 February 1986 (age 40) Punta Arenas, Chile
- Party: Republican Party
- Parent(s): Sergio Mac-Lean; Gloria Bravo
- Education: University of Chile (B.Sc); Cambridge University (M.Sc)
- Profession: Civil Engineer

Claudia Mac-Lean Bravo (born 11 February 1986) is a Chilean politician who served in the Constitutional Council.

== Biography ==
Mac-Lean was born in Punta Arenas on 11 February 1986. She is the daughter of Sergio Mac-Lean and Gloria Bravo Azlán.

She completed her secondary education at The British School of Punta Arenas, graduating in 2003. She later studied Civil Industrial Engineering at the University of Chile, and subsequently earned a master's degree in Engineering for Sustainability from the University of Cambridge in the United Kingdom.

== Professional career ==
Mac-Lean has developed her professional and academic career primarily in higher education and research institutions. She has worked at the University of Chile and at the GAIA Antarctic Research Center of the University of Magallanes. In addition to her academic work, she has held positions in various private organizations, including Fundación Chile and AGUNSA.

In 2013, she became a founding partner of Mac-Kay Sustainable Strategies. She also served as sustainability officer at the Faculty of Physical and Mathematical Sciences of the University of Chile until 2018. Since 2011, she has worked as an independent consultant and entrepreneur, providing advisory services across sectors such as health care, hospitality, and livestock production.

== Political career ==
Mac-Lean has been a member of the Republican Party of Chile since its early formation in June 2019. In the elections held on 7 May 2023, she ran as a candidate for the Constitutional Council representing the Republican Party for the 15th Circumscription of the Magallanes Region. She was elected with 9,887 votes.
