= María de los Ángeles López =

Chilean constituent

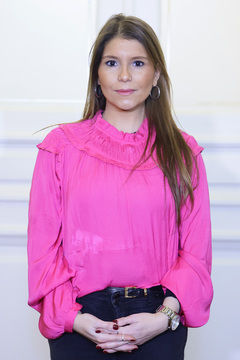

Member of the Constitutional Council
- In office 7 June 2023 – 7 December 2023
- Constituency: 6th Circumscription

Personal details
- Born: 2 April 1987 (age 39) San Felipe, Chile
- Party: Republican Party
- Parent(s): Jaime López; María Porfiri Marcotti
- Education: Adolfo Ibáñez University (LL.B)
- Occupation: Politician
- Profession: Lawyer

María de los Ángeles López Porfiri (born 2 April 1987) is a Chilean lawyer, politician and member of the Constitutional Council member.

== Biography ==
López was born in San Felipe on April 2, 1987, to Jaime Lopez Vega and Maria Porfiri Marcotti.

She completed her secondary education at Colegio Maria Auxiliadora in Los Andes, graduating in 2004. She later studied law at Adolfo Ibanez University and was admitted to the bar on October 14, 2011.

In addition to her legal training, she is an entrepreneur and co-founder of the company Mah! Colados.

== Politics and public service ==
In political life, López is a member of the Republican Party of Chile, where she serves as Secretary General for the Valparaiso Region and is a member of the party’s General Council.

She ran as a candidate for the Constitutional Convention in the 2021 elections representing District No. 6, but was not elected, receiving 6,462 votes (1.97% of the valid votes cast).

In the 2023 elections, López was elected to the Constitutional Council representing the 6th Circumscription (Valparaiso Region) as a candidate of the Republican Party. According to the Electoral Court (TRICEL), she received 70,905 votes. Within the Council, she serves as President of the Commission on Principles, Civil and Political Rights.

== Personal life ==
She is married to Alvaro Chinchilla Saez and is the mother of two children.
