= Jorge de la Maza =

Chilean constituent

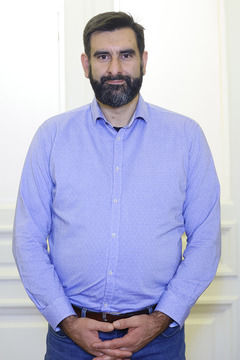

Member of the Constitutional Council
- In office 7 June 2023 – 7 November 2023
- Constituency: Los Ríos Region

Personal details
- Born: 14 November 1976 (age 49) Victoria, Chile
- Party: Republican Party
- Children: Two
- Parent(s): Lorenzo de la Maza; Carmen Schleyer
- Education: Universidad Mayor (LL.B); Austral University of Chile (M.D.); University of Chile (M.D.)
- Profession: Lawyer

Jorge de la Maza Schleyer (born 14 November 1976) is a Chilean politician who served in the Constitutional Council.

== Biography ==
De la Maza was born in Victoria on 14 November 1976. He is the son of Lorenzo De La Maza Lavanderos and Carmen Schleyer Grebe. He is married and has two children.

He studied law at Mayor University and qualified as a lawyer. He later completed a master's degree in Public Law at Austral University of Chile and is currently a candidate for a master's degree in Environmental Law at the University of Chile.

He has taught at Arturo Prat Naval Academy (UNAP) and San Sebastián University (USS). He currently teaches Civil Law at USS, Valdivia campus. He has also developed his professional career in various public services in the Los Ríos Region, including the National Forestry Corporation (CONAF), the Internal Revenue Service, the Third Environmental Court, and the Regional Housing and Urban Development Service.

In parallel, he serves as director of the Social Chamber of the Valdivia Wetlands Center, affiliated with Universidad Austral de Chile, and as secretary of the neighborhood association of the locality of Pilolcura.

== Political career ==
He was a candidate for the Chamber of Deputies as an independent on a Republican Party ticket in the 2021 parliamentary elections for District 24 (Los Ríos Region), but was not elected.

In the elections held on 7 May 2023, he ran as a candidate for the Constitutional Council representing the 12th constituency (Los Ríos Region), as a member of the Republican Party electoral pact. According to the Electoral Court of Chile, he was elected with 39,789 votes.
