= Ninoska Payauna =

Chilean constituent

Member of the Constitutional Council
- In office 7 June 2023 – 7 November 2023
- Constituency: 2nd Circumscription

Personal details
- Born: 12 December 1988 (age 37) Iquique, Chile
- Party: Republican Party (2021–2024); National Renewal (2026–)
- Parent(s): Lupercio Payauna; Nancy Vilca
- Education: Universidad del Mar
- Occupation: Politician
- Profession: Teacher

Ninoska Payauna Vilca (born 12 December 1988) is a Chilean teacher, politician and member of the Constitutional Council member.

== Biography ==
Payauna was born in Iquique on 12 December 1988. Her parents are Lupercio Payauna Cáceres and Nancy del Carmen Vilca. She is of Aymara descent and is the mother of one child.

She completed her primary education at Colegio República de Italia and graduated from secondary education in 2006 at Instituto Comercial Baldomero Wolnitzky, both in Iquique. She earned a degree as an English teacher from the Universidad del Mar and has worked as a school teacher for more than twelve years.

In addition to her teaching career, Payauna has been active in local media as host of the radio program Pa qué me invitan on FM Neura.

== Political career ==
Payauna has participated in regional political and civic activities in the Tarapacá Region. She was a candidate for the Regional Council representing the Province of Iquique in the 2021 general election, and served as a spokesperson for the «Rejection» option in the 2022 constitutional referendum. She has also been a member of the Regional Assembly of the Republican Party of Chile.

She currently supports the “DialogAR” initiative of the social-political movement Acción Republicana in her home region. In the elections held on 7 May 2023, she ran as a candidate for the Constitutional Council representing the Republican Party for the 2nd Circumscription of the Tarapacá Region. She was elected with 19,022 votes.
