= Germán Becker Alvear =

Chilean politician (born 1955)

Germán Becker
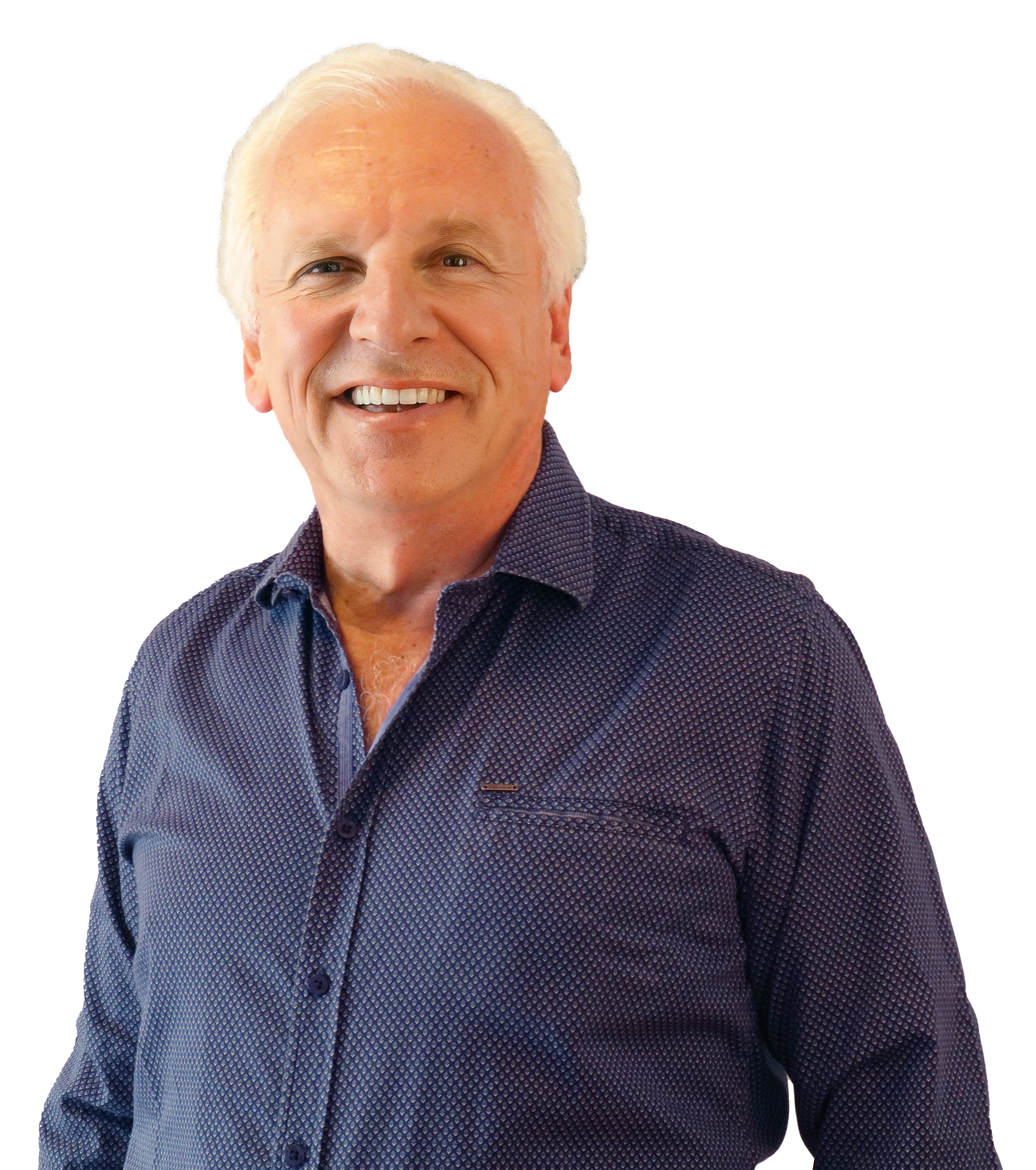
- Becker in 2023

Ambassador of Chile to Dominican Republic
- Incumbent
- Assumed office 17 June 2026
- President: José Antonio Kast
- Preceded by: Iván Favereau Urquiza

Member of the Constitutional Council
- In office 7 June 2023 – 7 November 2023
- Constituency: Araucanía Region

Ambassador of Chile to Panama
- In office 18 May 2018 – 11 March 2022
- Preceded by: Francisco Cruz Fuenzalida
- Succeeded by: Alejandro Sfeir

Member of the Chamber of Deputies
- In office 11 March 2002 – 11 March 2018
- Preceded by: José García Ruminot
- Succeeded by: District dissolved
- Constituency: 50th District

Councilman of Temuco
- In office 6 December 1996 – 6 December 2000

Personal details
- Born: 15 March 1955 (age 71) Temuco, Chile
- Party: National Renewal
- Spouse: María Carrera (divorced)
- Children: Three
- Parent(s): Germán Becker Baechler; María Antonieta Alvear
- Education: University of Chile (B.Sc)
- Occupation: Politician
- Profession: Civil engineer

Germán Becker Alvear (born 13 March 1955) is a Chilean politician who serves as ambassador of Chile to Dominican Republic since June 2026, under José Antonio Kast's presidency. Previously, he served as member of the Constitutional Council and the Chamber of Deputies of his country.

Similarly, he was appointed as ambassador to Panama during Sebastián Piñera's second government.

== Biography ==
Becker Alvear was born on 13 March 1955 in Temuco, the son of María Antonieta Alvear Campos and Germán Becker Baechler. He is the brother of Miguel Becker, who served as mayor of Temuco from 2008 to 2011.

He was married to Marta Victoria Inés Carrera Campos and is the father of three daughters.

He completed his secondary education at the German School of Temuco (Colegio Alemán de Temuco). He later entered the University of Chile, where he studied civil engineering and obtained his professional degree.

From 1987 to 2000, Becker served as general manager of DACSA S.A. He also worked as an advisor to the Directorate of the Barros Luco-Trudeau Hospital.

== Political career ==
Within the National Renewal Party (RN), Becker served as district president in the Araucanía Region from 1995 to 1996, and again from 1999 to 2000.

From 1996 to 2000 he served as a municipal councillor (concejal) of the Municipality of Temuco.

In the parliamentary elections of November 2001 Becker was elected as a member of the Chamber of Deputies of Chile representing District No. 50 for the term 2002–2006, on behalf of the National Renewal Party. He was re elected 3 times,until March 2018

In the elections held on 19 November 2017, he ran unsuccessfully for a seat in the Senate of Chile representing the 11th Senatorial District (Araucanía Region), within the Chile Vamos coalition.

On 8 June 2018 ,President Sebastian Piñera Echenique appointed Becker as ambassador of Chile to Panama

In 2023, Becker became a candidate for the Constitutional Council representing National Renewal on the Chile Seguro list in the Araucanía Region. He was elected with 50,943 votes, corresponding to 9.55% of the valid votes cast.

On 17 June 2026, President José Antonio Kast appointed Becker as ambassador of Chile to Dominican Republic.
