= Pilar Cuevas =

Chilean constituent

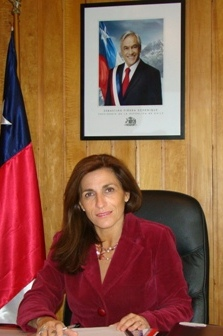

Member of the Constitutional Council
- In office 7 June 2023 – 7 November 2023
- Constituency: Aysén Region

Intendant of Aysen Region
- In office 11 March 2010 – 11 March 2014
- Appointed by: Sebastián Piñera

Personal details
- Born: 13 March 1964 (age 62) Santiago, Chile
- Party: National Renewal (RN)
- Spouse: Julio Zúñiga
- Children: Four
- Parent(s): Germán Cuevas Torrealba; María Teresa Mardones
- Education: University of Concepción (No Degree)
- Occupation: Politician

Pilar Alejandra Gema Cuevas Mardones (born 13 March 1964) is a Chilean politician who served as member of the Constitutional Council. Similarly, she served as Intendant of the Aysen Region in Chile.

She also served as Intendant of the Aysén Region from 2010 to 2014. She was also a member of the Constitutional Council representing the 14th senatorial constituency of the Aysén Region.

== Biography ==
Cuevas was born in Santiago, Chile. She is the daughter of Germán Cuevas Torrealba and María Teresa Mardones Guíñez.

She completed her primary education at Colegio María Inmaculada in Santiago and her secondary education at Instituto Santa María in Chillán. She later studied Law for three years at the University of Concepción. Her academic training was complemented by two postgraduate diplomas: one in Business Management from the Austral University of Chile and another in Pension Sales Management from Finis Terrae University.

== Public career ==
Cuevas began her political career in 1986, when she was appointed Regional Ministerial Secretary of Government in the Aysén Region, a position she held until 1990.

From 2001 to 2010, she served as a Regional Councillor of the Aysén Regional Government. During this period, she chaired the Science, Technology and Innovation Committee, served as secretary of the International Affairs Committee, and was a member of the Productive Development Committee. She also participated in the public–private Tourism Board of the region, the board of the Patagonia Research and Studies Center, and the Strategic Council of the Regional Productive Development Agency.

In 2010, Cuevas was appointed Intendant of the Aysén Region, a position she held until 2014. During the 2017 Chilean presidential election, she served as territorial campaign coordinator for Sebastián Piñera in the Aysén and Magallanes regions. In parallel, she ran as a candidate for the Senate representing Aysén, but was not elected, receiving 4,168 votes.

During Piñera’s second administration, Cuevas held the position of Head of the Municipalities Division at the Subsecretariat for Regional Development and Administrative Reform of the Ministry of the Interior.

In the elections of 7 May 2023, she ran for the Constitutional Council representing the 14th senatorial constituency of the Aysén Region as a candidate of National Renewal within the Chile Seguro electoral pact. She was elected with 9,061 votes. Within the council, she served on the Committee on Economic, Social, Cultural and Environmental Rights and later joined the Joint Committee tasked with proposing solutions to disputed provisions of the draft new constitution.
