= Diego Vargas Castillo =

Chilean constituent

Diego Vargas

Member of the Constitutional Council
- In office 7 June 2023 – 7 November 2023
- Constituency: Arica y Parinacota Region

Personal details
- Born: 23 April 2000 (age 26) Arica, Chile
- Party: Republican Party
- Parent(s): Marco Aurelio Vargas; Claude Castillo
- Education: University of Tarapacá
- Occupation: Politician

Diego Vargas Castillo (born 23 April 2000) is a Chilean politician who served in the Constitutional Council.

== Biography ==
Vargas was born in Arica on 23 April 2000. His parents are Marco Aurelio Vargas and Claudie Castillo Maureira.

He is currently a fifth-year law student at the Universidad de Tarapacá.

== Political career ==
Vargas has been involved in social and community activities since the age of 13, initially as a catechist within the Catholic Church. During his university years, he became a co-founder of the Movimiento Gremial at the Universidad de Tarapacá and later served as Northern Zone Vice President and National Pro-Secretary of the first national youth leadership of the Republican Party of Chile. He currently serves as Regional President of the party’s youth organization in the Arica and Parinacota Region.

He played a prominent role in the presidential campaign of José Antonio Kast, participating as part of the territorial campaign team. In the elections held on 7 May 2023, Vargas ran as a candidate for the Constitutional Council representing the Republican Party for the 1st Circumscription of the Arica and Parinacota Region. He was elected with 15,464 votes, becoming the youngest member of the Constitutional Council.
