= Expert Commission =

Chilean body that drafted a preliminary constitution in 2023

- Comisión Experta
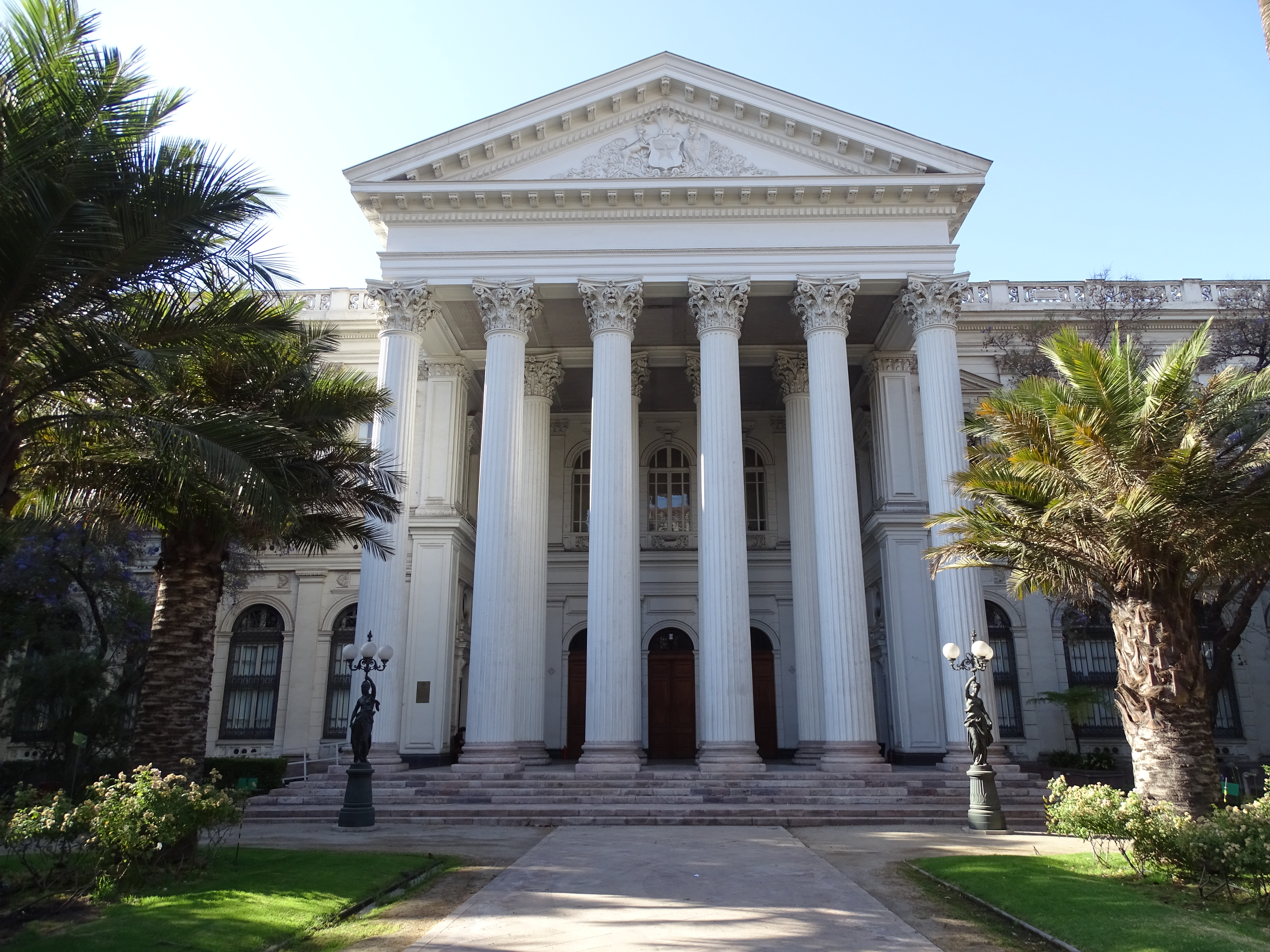
- Palace of the former National Congress in Santiago, seat of the commission
- Formation: 6 March 2023
- Type: Constitution-drafting advisory body
- Headquarters: Santiago, Chile
- Members: 24 commissioners
- President: Verónica Undurraga
- Website: www.procesoconstitucional.cl/comision-experta/

The Expert Commission (Spanish: Comisión Experta) was a 24-member body that Chile's National Congress appointed in 2023 to prepare a preliminary draft of a new constitution. It was one of three bodies created for the country's second attempt in two years to replace the 1980 Constitution, after voters rejected the first proposal in 2022. The other two were the elected Constitutional Council, which was to debate and amend the commission's text, and a 14-member technical committee that checked the draft against a set of agreed constitutional principles.

Law No. 21,533, published on 17 January 2023, established the commission. The commissioners, divided almost evenly between the governing coalition and the right-wing opposition, began work on 6 March 2023. They approved a 14-chapter draft by consensus at the end of May and delivered it to the Constitutional Council on 7 June 2023. The council, in which the Republican Party was the largest group, substantially rewrote the text, and voters rejected the council's version in a referendum on 17 December 2023.

== Background ==
On 4 September 2022, Chileans voted in a national plebiscite known as the "exit plebiscite" on the new Political Constitution of the Republic drafted earlier that year by the Constitutional Convention. The proposal had faced "intense criticism that it was too long, too left-wing and too radical" and was rejected by 62% to 38%. Observers described it as one of the world's most progressive constitutions, but many voters found it too polarizing, and controversies marred the process. The 1980 Constitution therefore remained in force.

=== Agreement for Chile ===
Political parties reached the "Agreement for Chile" (Acuerdo por Chile) on 12 December 2022 as a second attempt to draft a new constitution under different rules. It provided for 50 directly elected constitutional councillors to write the constitution from a preliminary draft prepared by 24 experts appointed by Congress. A 14-member body, also appointed by Congress, was to ensure that the text complied with 12 institutional and fundamental principles set out in the agreement.

The right-leaning Congress ratified the agreement as a constitutional reform a month later, although the Republican Party and the Party of the People did not take part in the agreement while agreeing to contest the elections. Unlike in the previous convention, a three-fifths majority was needed to approve articles, instead of two-thirds. The number of seats reserved for Indigenous representatives was not fixed but depended on the votes Indigenous candidates received, and the council was required to have equal numbers of men and women.

== Mandate and procedure ==
The commission's task was to prepare a preliminary draft (anteproyecto) of a new constitution for the 50 members of the Constitutional Council to discuss, starting in June 2023. The work period ran from 6 March to 6 June 2023, and the council was to begin work after the commission finished. Once the council was installed, the commissioners could attend its plenary sessions and committees and speak, but not vote. They could also sit on a joint committee with councillors to resolve disagreements over the text.

The commission divided into four subcommissions of six members each, with every subcommission assigned a thematic area:

- political system, constitutional reform and form of the State;
- jurisdictional function and autonomous bodies;
- principles, civil and political rights; and
- economic, social, cultural and environmental rights.

A subcommission needed an absolute majority of its members present to meet, and its agreements required the support of at least three-fifths of its members. The plenary could meet with at least one-third of members present, and any provision included in the draft had to be approved by at least three-fifths of the commissioners.

== Composition ==
=== Appointment ===
Congress appointed the 24 commissioners, half chosen by the Chamber of Deputies and half by the Senate. Each appointment needed the approval of four-sevenths of the members of the relevant chamber. The chamber of deputies voted on 24 January 2023 and the Senate on 25 January. Around the same time a joint committee of senators and deputies drew up the rules of procedure for the three bodies, which were approved on 23 January 2023.

=== Parliamentary groups ===
Ten commissioners came from the right-wing Chile Vamos coalition, six from the center-left Democratic Socialism, and four from the left-wing Approve Dignity. The Christian Democratic Party had two members, the Republican Party one, and one independent had no party affiliation.

Seat distribution of the commission by coalition

Coalition/Party		Members
Chile Vamos	National Renewal	5
Chile Vamos	Independent Democratic Union	4
Chile Vamos	Evópoli	1
Democratic Socialism	Socialist Party	3
Democratic Socialism	Party for Democracy	2
Democratic Socialism	Liberal Party	1
Approve Dignity	Communist Party	1
Approve Dignity	Social Convergence	1
Approve Dignity	Democratic Revolution	1
Approve Dignity	Social Green Regionalist Federation	1
Christian Democratic Party		2
Republican Party		1
Independent (supported by RN, PdG and Yellows)		1

=== Members ===
Party entries marked "independent" refer to commissioners who ran under the banner of a party without being members.

Image	Name	Coalition	Party	Appointed by	Subcommission
	Paz Anastasiadis	None	PDC	Chamber of Deputies	Jurisdictional function
	Jaime Arancibia	Chile Vamos	RN	Senate	Rights
	Alexis Cortés	Approve Dignity	PCCh	Chamber of Deputies	Rights
	Carlos Frontaura	None	Independent (nominated by the Republican Party)	Chamber of Deputies	Principles
	Magaly Fuenzalida	Approve Dignity	Independent (nominated by the FRVS)	Senate	Principles
	Natalia González	Chile Vamos	Independent (nominated by the UDI)	Chamber of Deputies	Political system
	Bettina Horst	Chile Vamos	Independent (nominated by the UDI)	Senate	Rights
	Alejandra Krauss	None	PDC	Senate	**Rights**
	Catalina Lagos	Democratic Socialism	PS	Senate	Principles
	Hernán Larraín	Chile Vamos	UDI	Senate	Jurisdictional function
	Domingo Lovera	Approve Dignity	RD	Chamber of Deputies	Jurisdictional function
	Katherine Martorell	Chile Vamos	RN	Senate	Jurisdictional function
	Gabriel Osorio	Democratic Socialism	PS	Senate	Political system
	Juan José Ossa	Chile Vamos	RN	Chamber of Deputies	**Political system**
	Máximo Pavez	Chile Vamos	UDI	Chamber of Deputies	**Principles**
	Marcela Peredo	None	Independent (nominated by the PDG)	Chamber of Deputies	Principles
	Flavio Quezada	Democratic Socialism	PS	Chamber of Deputies	Rights
	Teodoro Ribera	Chile Vamos	RN	Senate	Rights
	Antonia Rivas	Approve Dignity	CS	Chamber of Deputies	Political system
	Catalina Salem	Chile Vamos	Independent (nominated by RN)	Chamber of Deputies	**Jurisdictional function**
	Leslie Sánchez	Democratic Socialism	PL	Senate	Jurisdictional function
	Francisco Soto	Democratic Socialism	Independent (nominated by the PPD)	Senate	Political system
	Sebastián Soto	Chile Vamos	Evópoli	Senate	Political system
	Verónica Undurraga	Democratic Socialism	Independent (nominated by the PPD)	Chamber of Deputies	Principles
**Bold** indicates the chair of the subcommission.

=== Leadership ===
The commission was inaugurated on 6 March 2023 at the Palace of the former National Congress in Santiago. Hernán Larraín, at 75 the oldest commissioner, chaired the opening session. The rules provided for the president to be elected by majority vote and the vice president to be the runner-up, but the 24 commissioners instead agreed unanimously, without a vote, on Verónica Undurraga as president and Sebastián Soto as vice president. Opposition commissioners chaired three of the four subcommissions.

Office	Name	Political group
**President**	Verónica Undurraga	Party for Democracy
**Vice president**	Sebastián Soto	Evópoli

== Draft constitution ==
The four subcommissions voted on more than 900 amendments before the plenary took up the text. On 30 May 2023, almost three months after being installed, the commission finished voting on the 14 chapters of the preliminary draft. Undurraga said the commission had fulfilled its mandate, and that the 24 commissioners had defended differing views "with conviction and even with passion". Among other provisions, the draft proposed replacing the Constitutional Court's predecessor, the Constitutional Tribunal, with a new Constitutional Court, and removed the president's casting vote on the court. Soto said the commissioners had sought a consensus text that would "convene and not divide". Several proposals that the commission rejected, and some votes with dissenting commissioners, were expected to return for debate in the council.

The commission officially presented the text on 5 June 2023 after the General Secretariat of the Constitutional Process reviewed it. Undurraga described the achievement as "half of the way". The commission handed the draft to the newly installed Constitutional Council on 7 June 2023.

== Aftermath ==
The Constitutional Council, elected on 7 May 2023, used the commission's draft as its working base. The vote gave the right-wing parties, and the Republican Party above all, the largest share of seats. The council's own proposal was put to a mandatory referendum on 17 December 2023, where about 55.76% voted against and 44.24% in favor. Turnout was 84.5%, and voting was compulsory. President Gabriel Boric said his government would not pursue a third rewrite attempt and the 1980 Constitution stayed in force.
