= Paul Sfeir =

Chilean constituent

Member of the Constitutional Council
- In office 7 June 2023 – 7 November 2023
- Constituency: Atacama Region

Personal details
- Born: 29 December 1965 (age 60) Vina del Mar, Chile
- Party: Republican Party
- Spouse: Donatella Ungredda
- Education: Simón Bolívar University, Venezuela; Andres Bello Catholic University; Central University of Venezuela
- Occupation: Politician

Paul Sfeir Rubio (born 29 December 1965) is a Chilean politician who served as a member of the Chilean Constitutional Council.

In 2011, while living in the state of Florida, he unsuccessfully attempted to obtain a Guinness World Record for the longest continuous radio broadcast, reaching a total of 40 hours on air.

== Biography ==
In 1972, he moved with his family to Venezuela, where he completed his primary, secondary and university education. He finished his secondary education at the Liceo Ávila in Caracas in 1983; his diploma was officially recognized on 4 January 2023 by the Ministry of Education of Chile.

He pursued engineering studies at the Simón Bolívar University, the Andrés Bello Catholic University and the Central University of Venezuela, and also completed a diploma in Social Communication.

He has developed professional activities in journalism, mainly in radio stations in the Valparaíso Region, in media outlets in the United States and on digital platforms. He worked for the Global Information Agency of the United States, Radio República in Miami, and the radio station of the Cuban Democratic Directorate, based in Miami.

In 2011, he obtained a Guinness World Record as a radio broadcaster after conducting a marathon transmission related to the situation of political prisoners in Venezuela. As a result of this work, he received recognition from the United States Congress for his journalistic activities in support of democracy in the Americas. He has also been identified as the creator of one of the first Spanish-language radio stations with real-time internet broadcasting.

== Political career ==
Between March 2017 and May 2019, he served as a territorial coordinator and legislative advisor at the National Congress of Chile. During this period, he acted as an external advisor to deputy Luis Pardo Sainz.

According to information published on his LinkedIn profile, he worked as a representative of Radio Libra and Nexo S.A. before the National Congress in Valparaíso and at La Moneda Palace in Santiago, between 2012 and 2019. He later worked for Radio Televisión Martí from August 2019 to March 2021 in the Miami/Fort Lauderdale area, and participated in the television program Hola América between June and October 2019.

In May 2023, he was elected as a member of the Constitutional Council (Chile).
