= Patricia Spoerer =

Chilean constituent

Member of the Constitutional Council
- In office 7 June 2023 – 7 November 2023
- Constituency: Bío Bío Region

Personal details
- Born: 5 February 1972 (age 54) Hualpén, Chile
- Party: Republican Party
- Parent(s): Felipe Spoerer; Marilyn Price
- Education: University of Concepción (B.Sc)
- Profession: Economist

Isabel Patricia Spoerer Price (born 5 February 1972) is a Chilean politician who served in the Constitutional Council.

== Biography ==
Patricia Spoerer Price was born in Hualpén on 5 March 1972. She is the daughter of Felipe Spoerer O’Reilly and Marilyn Price Saffery.

She completed her primary and secondary education at Saint John's School, Concepción in San Pedro de la Paz, Concepción. She later studied commercial engineering at the University of Concepción.

Spoerer worked for fourteen years in private-sector companies, primarily in the areas of marketing and foreign trade. Since 2014, she has been active as a microentrepreneur and business owner, focusing on entrepreneurial initiatives in the private sector.

== Political career ==
In the elections held on 7 May 2023, Spoerer ran as a candidate for the Constitutional Council representing the Republican Party, for the 10th Circumscription of the Biobío Region. She was elected with 129,838 votes.
