= Jocelyn Ormeño =

Chilean constituent

Member of the Constitutional Council
- In office 7 June 2023 – 7 November 2023
- Constituency: Arica y Parinacota Region

Personal details
- Born: 10 May 1978 (age 48) Iquique, Chile
- Party: Independent
- Education: University of Tarapacá
- Profession: School teacher

Jocelyn Ormeño Lee (born 10 May 1978) is a Chilean politician who served in the Constitutional Council, where she was allied to the Socialist Party.

== Biography ==
Ormeño was born in Iquique on 10 May 1978. Her parents are Gil Rolando Ormeño Lara and Sonia Myriam Lee Estay.

=== Professional career ===
She is a primary education teacher and holds a higher technical degree in Child Care from the University of Tarapacá.

She was awarded the Pedagogical Excellence Allowance (Asignación de Excelencia Pedagógica, AEP) by the Ministry of Education, which grants membership in the Red Maestros de Maestros (RMM). She is also recognized as a Mentor Teacher by the Center for Pedagogical Improvement, Experimentation and Research (CPEIP).

She is a candidate for a master’s degree in Education with a specialization in Transformational Leadership and School Management at the Academia de Humanismo Cristiano University. Professionally, she works as a teacher in educational institutions administered by the Local Public Education Service Chinchorro. She also serves as vice president of the Educational Corporation Mentores Arica y Parinacota and as an academic associated with the Explora Program.

== Political career ==
In the elections held on 7 May 2023, Ormeño ran as a candidate for the Constitutional Council representing the 1st electoral district of the Arica and Parinacota Region, as an independent candidate on the list of the Socialist Party of Chile within the Unidad para Chile electoral pact. According to the Electoral Qualification Court (TRICEL), she was elected with 11,146 votes.
