= Karen Araya Rojas =

Chilean constituent

Karen Araya
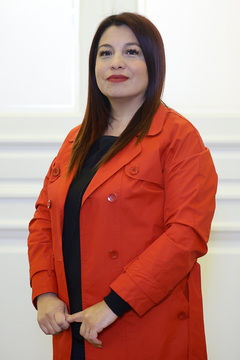

Member of the Constitutional Council
- In office 7 June 2023 – 7 November 2023
- Constituency: Santiago Metropolitan Region

Personal details
- Born: 25 September 1979 (age 46) Santiago, Chile
- Party: Humanist Party; Communist Party
- Children: Three
- Parent(s): Octavio Araya; Erika Rojas
- Education: Cardinal Silva Henríquez Catholic University (BA)

Karen Araya Rojas (born 25 September 1979) is a Chilean politician who served in the Constitutional Council.

She completed her secondary education in 1998 at the DUOC Foundation. She later enrolled in a program in Primary Education with a specialization in Language at the Raúl Silva Henríquez Catholic University, where she trained as a primary school teacher. She has also received professional training in School Coexistence and educational community management.

For more than fifteen years, she has worked as a teacher for students in grades five through eight. She currently teaches Language at the municipal school Colegio Las Lilas in the La Florida commune.

== Biography ==
She was born on 25 September 1979 in Santiago. She is the daughter of Octavio Araya Muñoz and Erika Rojas Valenzuela. She is divorced and the mother of three children.

== Political career ==
She began her political involvement as a member of the Humanist Party and in 2013 joined the Communist Party of Chile. She served as president of the Teachers’ Association (Colegio de Profesores) in the La Florida commune and previously held the position of secretary general within the same teachers’ union organization.

In the elections held on 7 May 2023, she ran as a candidate for the Constitutional Council representing the 7th electoral district of the Metropolitan Region of Santiago, as a member of the Communist Party of Chile within the Unidad para Chile electoral pact. According to the Electoral Qualification Court (TRICEL), she was elected with 494,436 votes.
