= Kinturay Melín =

Chilean constituent

Member of the Constitutional Council
- In office 7 June 2023 – 7 November 2023
- Constituency: Los Ríos Region

Personal details
- Born: 24 May 1994 (age 32) Temuco, Chile
- Party: Democratic Revolution (RD)
- Education: University of the Frontier
- Profession: Lawyer

Kinturay Carlina Melin Rapimán (born 24 May 1994) is a Chilean politician who served in the Constitutional Council.

In her professional career, she has worked as a legal adviser to various Mapuche and environmental organizations. Between May and July 2019, she worked as a support professional at Technical Cooperation Service (SERCOTEC). From February to March 2022, she served as a moderator for the Secretariat for Indigenous Participation and Consultation in the communes of Cholchol and Lumaco.

Since January 2022, she has been part of the legal team of the environmental foundation Karükeche and has also worked as an adviser and legal representative in private legal cases.

== Biography ==
She was born on 24 May 1994 in Temuco. She is the daughter of Juan José Melín Colihuinca and Rosa Rapimán Morales. She is of Mapuche descent and is the mother of one child.

She completed her primary education at the Marcela Paz Municipal School and at Sun Flower School, graduating in 2007. She completed her secondary education at the Instituto Claret de Temuco, graduating in 2011. Beginning in 2012, she studied law at the University of La Frontera, where she obtained a licentiate degree in Legal Sciences.

== Political career ==
She is a member of the Democratic Revolution (RD) party and has served as a territorial coordinator, as well as a member of the Ecosocial Front of RD and the Feminist Front of Araucanía. She is also a member of the José Melín Indigenous Community of the commune of Nueva Imperial.

In the elections held on 7 May 2023, she ran as a candidate for the Constitutional Council representing the 11th electoral district of the Araucanía Region, as a member of the Democratic Revolution party within the Unidad para Chile electoral pact. According to the Electoral Qualification Court (TRICEL), she was elected with 19,059 votes.
