= María Claudia Jorquera =

Chilean constituent

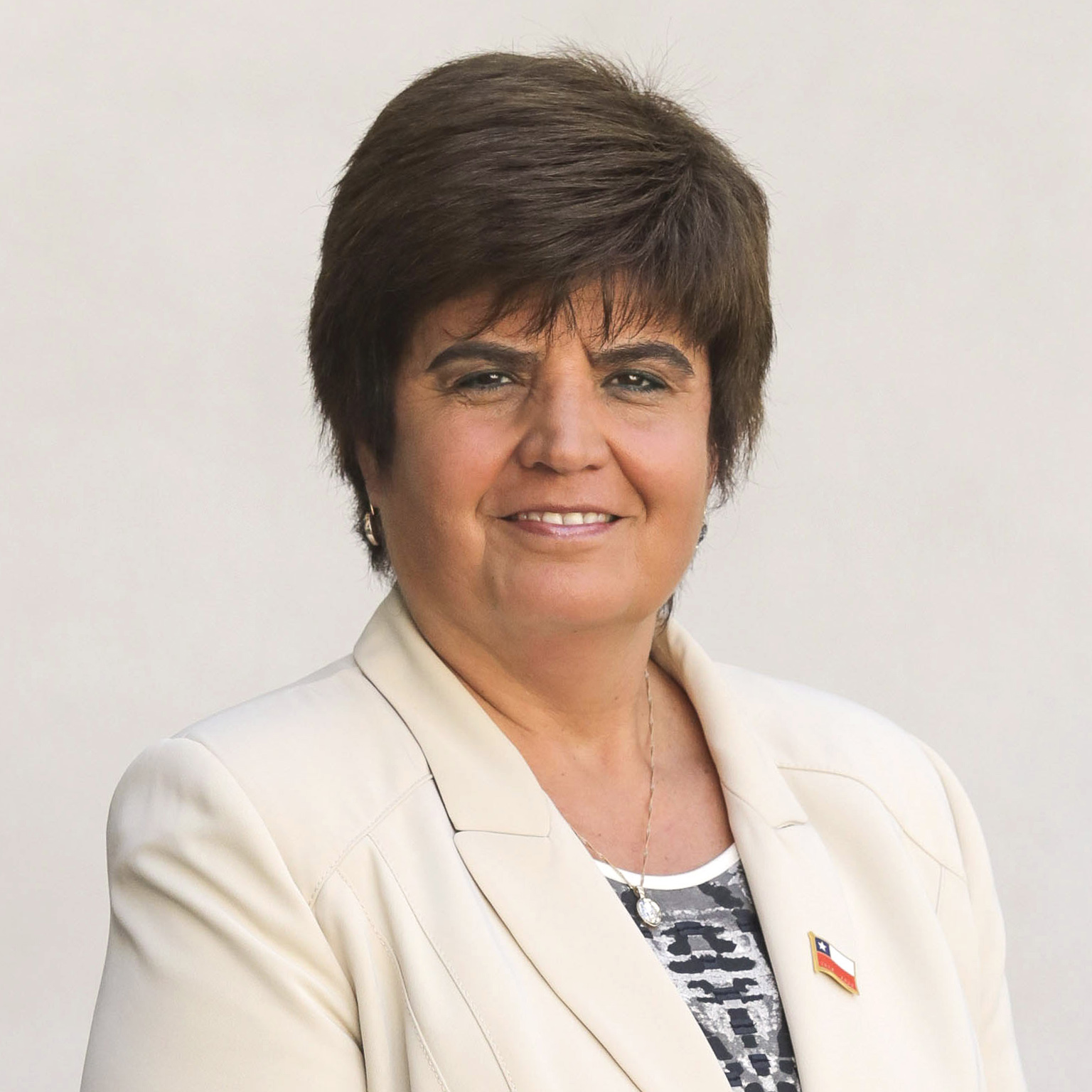

Member of the Constitutional Council
- In office 7 June 2023 – 7 November 2023
- Constituency: Maule Region

Personal details
- Born: 2 January 1967 (age 59) Talca, Chile
- Party: Independent Democratic Union (UDI)
- Education: Autonomous University of Chile; University of Talca (MA)
- Profession: Social worker

María Claudia Jorquera Coria (born 2 January 1967) is a Chilean politician who served in the Constitutional Council.

== Biography ==
She was born in Talca on 2 January 1967. She is the daughter of Ciro Jorquera Abarzúa and María Coria Martínez.

She completed her schooling at the Colegio Integrado San Pío in Talca and studied Social Work at the Universidad Autónoma del Sur. She holds a master’s degree in Public Management from the University of Talca.

=== Political career ===
She served as Regional Director of the Social Solidarity and Investment Fund (FOSIS) during the first administration of President Sebastián Piñera. In 2018, she was appointed Governor of the Linares Province by President Piñera.

She has also worked as a municipal public servant, holding positions in the Community Development Department (DIDECO) of the Municipality of Linares and Parral.

Additionally, she worked as a coordinator of social programs in the parliamentary offices of former senator for the Maule Region Hernán Larraín Fernández.

In the elections held on 7 May 2023, she ran as a candidate for the Constitutional Council representing the 9th electoral district of the Maule Region, as a member of the Independent Democratic Union (UDI) within the Chile Seguro electoral pact. She was elected with 30,723 votes.
