= Carlos Recondo =

Chilean constituent

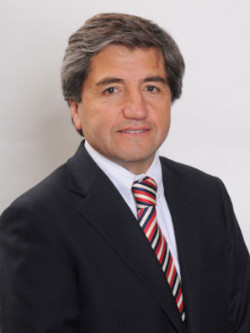

Member of the Constitutional Council
- In office 7 June 2023 – 7 November 2023
- Constituency: 11th Circumscription

Regional Counselor of Los Lagos
- In office 11 March 2014 – 21 July 2016
- Succeeded by: Jorge Moreno

Pro-Secretary of the Independent Democratic Union (UDI)
- In office 1 July 2006 – 5 July 2008
- President: Hernán Larraín
- Preceded by: Patricio Melero
- Succeeded by: Felipe Salaberry

Member of the Chamber of Deputies
- In office 11 March 1990 – 11 March 1994
- Preceded by: Creation of the District
- Succeeded by: Harry Jürgensen
- Constituency: 56th District
- In office 11 March 1998 – 11 March 2014
- Preceded by: Harry Jürgensen
- Succeeded by: Felipe de Mussy
- Constituency: 56th District

Mayor of Los Muermos
- In office 22 May 1986 – 17 October 1989
- Preceded by: Udo Berner
- Succeeded by: Arnoldo Karachon

Personal details
- Born: 27 April 1954 (age 72) Santiago, Chile
- Party: Independent Democratic Union (UDI)
- Spouse: Samira Said
- Children: Three
- Education: Austral University of Chile (BA)
- Occupation: Politician
- Profession: Physician

Carlos Recondo Lavanderos (born 27 April 1954) is a Chilean politician who served as member of the Constitutional Council and the Chamber of Deputies of his country.

== Biography ==
Recondo Lavanderos was born on 27 April 1954 in Puerto Montt. He is married to Samira Said and has three children: Carlos Eduardo, Rosario Andrea, and Consuelo Loreto.

He completed his secondary education at Colegio San Javier in Puerto Montt and at the Alianza Francesa School in Osorno. He later entered the Austral University of Valdivia, where he obtained a degree in veterinary medicine. He subsequently earned a Master of Business Administration (MBA) from the same institution.

=== Professional career ===
Recondo began his professional career at the Instituto de Desarrollo Agropecuario (INDAP) in Puerto Montt, where he worked for two years. He later served as head of INDAP in the locality of Los Muermos.

Between 1994 and 1997, he worked as zonal manager for Valdivia at the Asociación Chilena de Seguridad (ACHS).

== Political and public career ==
Recondo became politically active in 1972 through participation in the Gremialist Movement and the Confederation of Democracy (CODE), organizations that opposed the government of President Salvador Allende. His involvement continued until 1973.

In May 1986, he was appointed mayor of Los Muermos, a position he held until 1989.

A member of the Independent Democratic Union (UDI), Recondo served as regional president of the party from 1990 to 1992, and again from 1998 to 2002.

In December 1993, he ran unsuccessfully for re-election to the Chamber of Deputies of Chile representing District No. 56.

In the regional elections of November 2013, Recondo was elected as a Regional Councillor (CORE) for the Province of Llanquihue, serving for the term 2014–2018, with 10.40% of the vote.

On 22 March 2018, he was appointed National Director of the INDAP.

In 2023, Recondo became a candidate for the Constitutional Council representing the Independent Democratic Union on the Chile Seguro list in the Los Lagos Region. He was elected with 37,125 votes, corresponding to 8.4% of the valid votes cast.
