= Carolina Navarrete =

Chilean constituent

Member of the Constitutional Council
- In office 7 June 2023 – 7 November 2023
- Constituency: Ñuble Region

Personal details
- Born: 27 February 1990 (age 36) Chillán, Chile
- Party: Independent Democratic Union (UDI)
- Parent(s): Oscar Navarrete; Sonia Rubio
- Education: University of Concepción
- Profession: Lawyer

Carolina Angélica Navarrete Rubio (born 27 February 1990) is a Chilean politician who served in the Constitutional Council.

== Biography ==
She was born on 22 May 1990 in Chillán. She is the daughter of Óscar Navarrete Bustos and Sonia Rubio Torres.

She completed her primary and secondary education at the Colegio de la Purísima Concepción in Chillán, graduating in 2009. Between 2010 and 2014, she studied law at the University of Concepción. She was admitted to the bar on 12 May 2017. She later earned a master's degree in Public Policy from the University for Development.

Between March 2017 and May 2018, she worked as a lawyer at the Municipality of Chillán. Subsequently, between March 2022 and May 2023, she served as a legislative adviser to Senator Gustavo Sanhueza of the Independent Democratic Union (UDI).

== Political career ==
In September 2018, she was appointed Regional Ministerial Secretary (SEREMI) of National Assets for the Ñuble Region. She held this position until March 2022.

Between June and September 2018, she served as Ministerial Delegate of National Assets in the Ñuble Region.

In the elections held on 7 May 2023, she ran as a candidate for the Constitutional Council representing the 16th electoral district of the Ñuble Region, as a member of the Independent Democratic Union (UDI) within the Chile Seguro electoral pact. According to the Electoral Qualification Court (TRICEL), she was elected with 40,433 votes.
