= Carlos Solar =

Chilean constituent

Member of the Constitutional Council
- In office 7 June 2023 – 7 November 2023
- Constituency: Antofagasta Region

Personal details
- Born: 22 November 1955 (age 70) Antofagasta, Chile
- Party: Republican Party (2023–2024)
- Spouse: Patricia Sigala
- Parent(s): Leopoldo Solar; Liliana Barrios
- Education: University of Chile
- Occupation: Politician

Carlos Solar Barrios (born 22 November 1955) is a Chilean cardiac surgeon and politician.

He served as a member of the Chilean Constitutional Council representing the 3rd constituency of the Antofagasta Region.

== Biography ==
Solar was born in Antofagasta on 22 November 1955. He is the son of Leopoldo Fidel Solar Valladares and Liliana Barrios Ardiles. He married Patricia del Carmen Sigala Bustos on 5 June 1981.

He studied medicine at the University of Chile, where he obtained his medical degree. He later completed a subspecialty in cardiac surgery. In 1995, he returned to Antofagasta after completing his postgraduate training.

He worked as a medical surgeon at the Regional Hospital of Copiapó between 1981 and 1983, and as a surgeon at the Regional Hospital of Antofagasta between 1986 and 1992. He also served as a faculty member at the School of Medicine of the University of Chile until 2018.

He has also practiced as a private physician in clinics in his home city of Antofagasta.

== Political career ==
In 2022, Solar joined the Republican Party of Chile.

In the 7 May 2023 election, he ran as a candidate for the Constitutional Council representing the 3rd constituency of the Antofagasta Region under the Republican Party banner. According to official results from the Elections Qualifying Court of Chile, he was elected with 53,700 votes.

In 2024, he resigned from the Republican Party of Chile.
