= Mariela Fincheira =

Chilean constituent

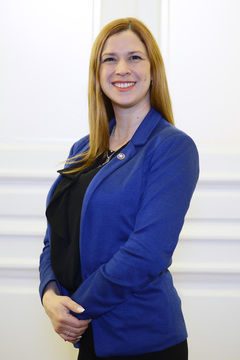

Member of the Constitutional Council
- In office 7 June 2023 – 7 November 2023
- Constituency: La Araucanía

Personal details
- Born: 4 September 1983 (age 43) Temuco, Chile
- Party: Republican Party
- Parent(s): Fernando Fincheira; Mariela Massardo
- Education: Santo Tomás University (BA)
- Occupation: Politician

Mariela Fincheira Massardo (born 4 September 1983) is a Chilean politician who served in the Constitutional Council.

From July 2016 to June 2018, she worked as animal welfare and PABCO management officer. Later, she served as a professional support staff member on A.I.I.A. projects at the Government of Cautín Province (2018–2019).

Between September 2019 and December 2022, she worked as a professional support staff member in the Indigenous Territorial Development Program (PDTI) of INDAP in Temuco and Padre Las Casas.

== Biography ==
She was born in Temuco on 4 September 1983. She is the daughter of Fernando Fincheira Echeverría and Mariela Massardo Godoy. She is married to Patrick Alán Casanova Tobar and is the mother of four children.

She completed her secondary education at Colegio Santa Cruz in Temuco, graduating in 2001. She later studied veterinary medicine at Universidad Santo Tomás, earning her degree in 2013.

Between January and March 2011, she completed her professional internship at the Regional Secretariat of Health of the Araucanía Region. Between June 2013 and December 2015, she held several positions at Frigorífico Temuco S.A., including animal welfare and traceability officer, inspector of good manufacturing practices, and head of livestock pens.

== Political career ==
She is a member of the Republican Party of Chile. She served as a regional party officer and was a candidate for the Regional Council in the 2021 elections, representing the Cautín II constituency, but was not elected. She received 2,400 votes, corresponding to 1.82% of the valid votes cast.

In the elections held on 7 May 2023, she ran as a candidate for the Constitutional Council representing the 11th constituency (Araucanía Region), as a member of the Republican Party electoral pact. According to the Electoral Court of Chile, she was elected with 35,872 votes.
