= Lorena Gallardo =

Chilean constituent (born 1979)

Member of the Constitutional Council
- In office 7 June 2023 – 7 November 2023
- Constituency: Los Ríos Region

Personal details
- Born: 10 February 1979 (age 46) Santiago, Chile
- Party: National Renewal (RN)
- Children: One
- Parent(s): Eladio Gallardo Almonacid; María Cárdenas Bahamonde
- Profession: Lawyer

Lorena Gallardo Cárdenas (born 10 February 1979) is a Chilean politician who served as member of the Constitutional Council.

== Biography ==
She was born in Santiago on 10 February 1979. She is the daughter of Eladio Gallardo Almonacid and María Cárdenas Bahamonde.

She completed her secondary education at the Liceo Isidora Zegers de Huneeus in Puerto Montt, graduating in 1996. She later earned a law degree. Her professional career has focused on family law, civil law, and migration law.

== Political career ==
An independent politician close to the National Renewal (RN) party, she has also served as a sports leader in the Los Ríos Region.

In the elections held on 7 May 2023, she ran as a candidate for the Constitutional Council representing the 12th constituency (Los Ríos Region), as an independent candidate on a RN ticket within the Chile Seguro electoral pact. According to the Electoral Court of Chile, she was elected with 6,544 votes.
