= Ricardo Ortega Perrier =

Chilean constituent

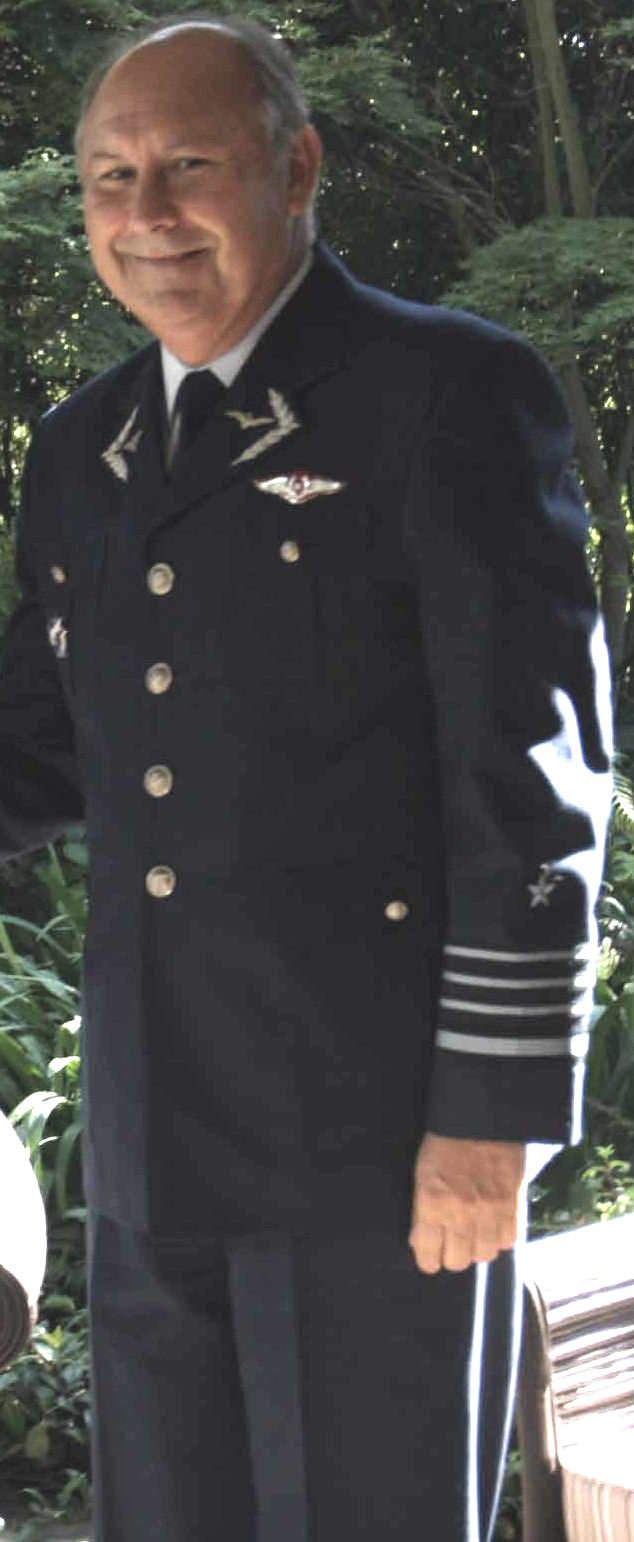

Member of the Constitutional Council
- In office 7 June 2023 – 7 November 2023
- Constituency: Maule Region

Commander-in-chief of the Chilean Air Force
- In office 5 November 2006 – 5 November 2010
- President: Michelle Bachelet; Sebastián Piñera
- Preceded by: Osvaldo Sarabia
- Succeeded by: Jorge Rojas Ávila

Personal details
- Born: 18 September 1951 (age 75) Iquique, Chile
- Party: Republican Party
- Spouse: Denise Shand
- Children: Four
- Parent(s): Ricardo Ortega Fredes; María Perrier
- Education: Captain Manuel Ávalos Prado Aviation School; Pontifical Catholic University of Chile (Lic.); University of Chile (M.Sc); Gabriela Mistral University (MBA)
- Occupation: Militar/Politician
- Profession: Aviator

Ricardo Ortega Perrier (born 18 September 1951) is a Chilean politician who served in the Constitutional Council.

Ortega Perrier was born in Iquique on 18 September 1951, the son of Ricardo Ortega Fredes and María Perrier Araya. He is married to Denise Benard Shand and is the father of four children.

== Education and military career ==
On 1 January 1967, Ortega entered the Chilean Air Force Academy (Escuela de Aviación), graduating on 1 January 1972 with the rank of second lieutenant. In parallel, he pursued undergraduate studies in Education at the Pontifical Catholic University of Chile.

During the 1980s, he undertook advanced training at the War Academy and abroad, including studies in International Relations, Military Administration, and Aeronautical Law.

Between 1990 and 1992, Ortega completed a Master’s degree in Political Science at the University of Chile, graduating in 1994. Between 1991 and 1994, he pursued an International Master’s in Business Administration (MBA) at the Universidad Gabriela Mistral, completing the degree in 1995.

Ortega served as executive director of the FIDAE Air Show and as a representative of the Logistics Command of the Chilean Air Force on missions in Washington, D.C. and London. In 2001, he became head of the Education Division, and in 2002 he was placed in charge of the Personnel Command. From 2002 onward, he served as Chief of the General Staff of the Air Force.

== Professional activity ==
Between November 2010 and November 2012, Ortega served as president of IFT Energy, an international trade fair for energy industry technologies organized by Kallman Worldwide. From November 2011 to December 2017, he worked for the same company as its representative in Chile.

He has worked as a consultant for various organizations in areas including defense, the defense industry, mining, international trade, new technologies, and the development of aeronautical projects.

== Political career ==
Ortega is a member of the Republican Party of Chile and was previously affiliated with the now-defunct National Citizen Party (Partido Nacional Ciudadano).

In March 2006, during the administration of President Michelle Bachelet, he was appointed as a member of the board of directors of the National Copper Corporation of Chile (CODELCO). He also served on the board of directors of the Empresa Nacional de Aeronáutica de Chile (ENAER), first as a director in 2006 and later as its president from 2007 to 2009.

In October 2006, Ortega was appointed Commander-in-Chief of the Chilean Air Force by President Bachelet, a position he held from November 2006 to November 2010.

In the parliamentary elections of 2021, Ortega ran unsuccessfully for the Senate of Chile representing the 7th Senatorial District of the Metropolitan Region of Santiago as a candidate of the Republican Party within the Frente Social Cristiano coalition. He obtained 16,370 votes, corresponding to 0.62% of the valid votes cast.

In the elections held on 7 May 2023, Ortega ran as a candidate for the Constitutional Council representing the 9th Senatorial District of the Maule Region as a member of the Republican Party. According to the Electoral Court of Chile (TRICEL), he was elected with 69,740 votes.
