= Arturo Phillips =

Chilean constituent

Member of the Constitutional Council
- In office 7 June 2023 – 7 November 2023
- Constituency: 11th Circumscription

Personal details
- Born: 21 December 1995 (age 30) Santiago, Chile
- Party: Independent Democratic Union (UDI)
- Parent(s): Arturo Phillips Pereira; María Susana Dörr
- Education: Pontifical Catholic University of Chile (LL.B)
- Occupation: Politician
- Profession: Lawyer

Arturo Phillips Dorr (Santiago, 21 December 1995) is a Chilean lawyer and independent politician.

He served as a member of the Constitutional Council representing the 11th constituency of the Araucanía Region.

== Biography ==
Phillips completed his primary and secondary education at the German School of Santiago, graduating in 2014. At the same time, between 2009 and 2012, he undertook studies in piano and musical language at the Institute of Music (IMUC) of the Pontifical Catholic University of Chile. At the same institution, he later served as a teaching assistant in criminal law courses.

Between 2015 and 2020, he studied Law at the Pontifical Catholic University of Chile. He was admitted to the bar on 20 May 2022. During his professional training, between November 2018 and January 2020, he worked as a legal clerk in corporate, banking, commercial, and civil matters at the legal division of Banco Falabella.

Between April and October 2021, Phillips completed his professional internship at the Metropolitan Legal Aid Corporation in the commune of Cerrillos.

== Political career ==
Between July 2021 and July 2022, he served as an advisor to the caucus of constitutional convention members from the Independent Democratic Union and the Republican Party of Chile during the Chilean Constitutional Convention.

In the elections held on 7 May 2023, Phillips ran for the Constitutional Council representing the 11th constituency of the Araucanía Region as an independent candidate, on a seat allocated to the Independent Democratic Union within the Chile Seguro electoral pact. According to official results from the Electoral Court of Chile (TRICEL), he was elected with 66,376 votes.
