= Harry Jürgensen =

Chilean constituent

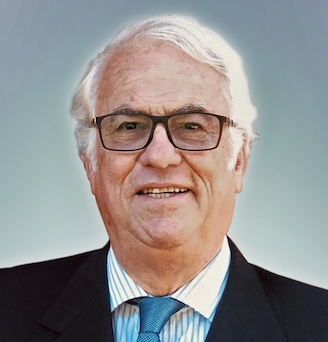

Member of the Constitutional Convention
- In office 4 July 2021 – 4 July 2022
- Constituency: 25th District

Intendant of the Los Lagos Region
- In office 11 March 2018 – 11 March 2021
- Preceded by: Leonardo La Prida
- Succeeded by: Carlos Geisse Mac-Evoy

Member of the Chamber of Deputies
- In office 11 March 1994 – 11 March 1998
- Preceded by: Carlos Recondo
- Succeeded by: Carlos Recondo
- Constituency: 56th District

Personal details
- Born: 30 May 1942 (age 83) Osorno, Chile
- Party: National Renewal (1987−present)
- Spouse: Wiltrudis Rundshagen
- Children: Two
- Parent(s): Tomás Jürgensen; Francisca Caesar
- Occupation: Politician

Harry Jurgensen Caesar (born 30 May 1942) is a Chilean accountant and politician. A member of National Renewal (RN), he served as a member of the Chamber of Deputies of Chile for District No. 56 of the Los Lagos Region (1994–1998).

He also served Intendant of the Los Lagos Region from 2018 to 2021 during the second administration of President Sebastián Piñera. He served as Intendant of Los Lagos Region.

== Early life and family ==
He was born on 30 May 1942 in Osorno, Chile. He is the son of Tomás Jürgensen and Francisca Caesar.

He married Wiltrudis Millarey Rundshagen Kruschinski, and they have two children. He is the father of Harry Kurt Jurgensen Rundshagen, a deputy representing District No. 25 of the Los Lagos Region.

== Professional career ==
Jurgensen completed his primary and secondary education at the German Institute of Osorno and the Commercial Institute of Valdivia. He qualified as a general accountant in 1962, presenting a thesis titled Tourism and Hotels.

Between 1961 and 1962, he worked in the accounting office of the newspaper La Prensa of Osorno. From 1963 to 1964, he served as accountant for the Agricultural and Livestock Society of Osorno (SAGO) and GAOSA, and later practiced his profession independently.

In 1964, he joined Feria de Osorno S.A. as an accountant and, in the same year, became agent of its Puerto Montt branch. In 1968, he was appointed general manager of the main office of the Agricultural Fair in Osorno.

He has also engaged in agricultural activities, managing the Quinquelelfún estate.

== Political career ==
In 1973, Jurgensen served as president of the Multigremial Command of Osorno and of the Southern Cone Command from Biobío to Llanquihue.

On 8 June 1987, he was appointed a member of the Economic and Social Council for the period between 1 May 1987 and 30 April 1988.

In 1987, he joined National Renewal, becoming a founding member and local leader of the party in Osorno. Three years later, he was elected president of the party in his district in the Los Lagos Region, and in 1992 he was confirmed in the position and appointed national councillor. He later served as a general councillor of the party and as one of ten members of its Political Commission.

In the first municipal elections of 1992, he was in charge of the electoral campaigns in Districts No. 55 and 56 of the Los Lagos Region.

In the parliamentary elections of December 1993, Jurgensen ran as a candidate for the Chamber of Deputies representing National Renewal for District No. 56 of the Los Lagos Region and was elected for the 1994–1998 term, obtaining 18,938 votes, equivalent to 26.96% of the valid votes cast.

In December 1997, he ran as a candidate for the Senate of Chile representing National Renewal for the 17th Senatorial Circumscription (Los Lagos Sur Region) for the 1998–2006 term, obtaining 37,985 votes (19.22%), but was not elected.

On 7 April 2014, he was appointed by President Michelle Bachelet as a member of the Presidential Advisory Commission for Regional Development.

On 11 March 2018, he was appointed Intendant of the Los Lagos Region by President Sebastián Piñera. He resigned from the position on 11 January 2021 in order to run as a candidate for the Constitutional Convention representing District No. 25 of the Los Lagos Region.
