= Alejandro Kohler =

Chilean constituent

Alejandro Köhler

Member of the Constitutional Council
- In office 7 June 2023 – 7 November 2023
- Constituency: Los Ríos Region

Mayor of Panguipulli
- In office 6 December 2000 – 6 December 2008

Personal details
- Born: 16 October 1955 (age 70) Chillán, Chile
- Party: Socialist Party (PS)
- Education: University of Santiago, Chile (UTE)
- Profession: Electrician

Alejandro Köhler Vargas (born 16 October 1955) is a Chile politician who served in the Constitutional Council.

He completed his secondary education at the Liceo Industrial de Valdivia, graduating in 1973 with a technical secondary degree in electricity. He later studied at the Technical State University, where he obtained a professional technical degree in the same field.

He has worked as a tourism entrepreneur in the locality of Coñaripe.

== Biography ==
Alejandro Köhler Vargas was born in Chillán on 16 October 1955. He is the son of Alejandro Arturo Köhler Lagarde, a member of the Socialist Party of Chile (PS), and María Nery Vargas Dávila.

== Political career ==
An independent politician and former member of the PS, Köhler served as mayor of the commune of Panguipulli for two consecutive terms (2000–2004 and 2004–2008). During his tenure as mayor, he also served as president of the Association of Municipalities of the former Valdivia Province.

As president of the Association, he played a leading role in the movement advocating for the creation of the Los Ríos Region. He is considered one of the founders of that region. He later served as a municipal councillor for the commune of Panguipulli for the 2020–2024 term but resigned from the position to run for the Constitutional Council.

In the elections held on 7 May 2023, Köhler ran as a candidate for the Constitutional Council representing the 12th electoral district of the Los Ríos Region, as an independent candidate on the list of the Socialist Party of Chile within the Unidad para Chile electoral pact. According to the Electoral Qualification Court (TRICEL), he was elected with 14,704 votes.
