= Cecilia Medina Meneses =

Chilean constituent

Cecilia Medina
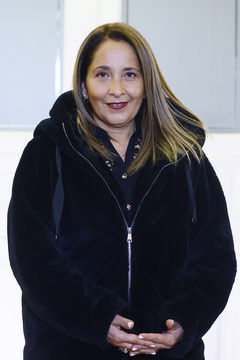

Member of the Constitutional Council
- In office 7 June 2023 – 7 November 2023
- Constituency: Ñuble Region

Personal details
- Born: 20 September 1965 (age 61) Santiago, Chile
- Party: Republican Party
- Parent(s): Valentín Medina; Ruth Meneses
- Education: Inacap; Santo Tomás University

Cecilia Violeta Medina Meneses (born 20 September 1965) is a Chilean politician who served in the Constitutional Council.

== Biography ==
Medina was born in Santiago on 20 September 1965. She is the daughter of Valentín Medina Mora and Ruth Meneses Castillo.

She completed her secondary education at Liceo No. 15 Gabriela Mistral in Santiago, graduating in 1983. She later studied Tourism as a technical degree at the Instituto de Capacitación Profesional de Chile (INACAP). Beginning in 2020, she pursued studies in Administration Engineering with a specialization in Public Management at Santo Tomás University.

Medina has developed her professional career primarily in the private health and pension systems, working as a pension and commercial advisor. Alongside her professional activities, she has been active as a trade union leader in her region, combining workplace representation with organizational roles.

== Political career ==
Medina is a member and regional secretary of the Republican Party of Chile in the Ñuble Region. In the 2021 municipal elections, she ran as a candidate for the municipal council of Chillán representing the Republican Party within the Republicanos pact. She obtained 766 votes (32.10%) but was not elected.

In the elections held on 7 May 2023, Medina ran as a candidate for the Constitutional Council representing the Republican Party for the 16th Circumscription of the Ñuble Region. She was elected with 46,154 votes.
