= Jessica Bengoa =

Chilean politician (born 1979)

Member of the Constitutional Council
- In office 7 June 2023 – 7 November 2023
- Constituency: Magallanes Region

Personal details
- Born: 18 October 1979 (age 46) Punta Arenas, Chile
- Party: Social Convergence (CS)
- Education: University of Magallanes
- Profession: Social Worker

Jessica Bengoa Mayorga (born 18 October 1979) is a Chilean politician who served in the Constitutional Council.

== Biography ==
She was born in Punta Arenas on 18 October 1979. She is the daughter of Sergio Bengoa Tenorio and Sylvia Mayorga Paredes.

She completed her primary education at Escuela E-14 Arturo Prat Chacón and at Colegio Punta Arenas. Then, Bengoa completed her secondary education at Colegio Punta Arenas, graduating in 1997.

She later studied Social Work at the University of Magallanes between 1998 and 2002. She subsequently completed a master’s degree in Strategic Public Management and Local Development at the Ibero-American Corporation of Public and Business Affairs of the University of the Sea (2010–2012). In addition, she holds a postgraduate diploma in Human Resources and People Management from the Forgent Institute (2021).

Professionally, she served as Regional Coordinator of the National Commission on Political Imprisonment and Torture at the Provincial Government of Magallanes, and as regional and provincial coordinator of the Welfare Service of the Regional Ministerial Secretariat of Education of the Magallanes and Chilean Antarctic Region, among other public-sector positions.

== Political career ==
She served as Provincial President of Magallanes of the Central Unitary Workers’ Union (CUT), Regional President of the National Association of Public Employees (ANEF), and as a grassroots leader of the National Association of Officials of the Ministry of Education (ANDIME–Secreduc). In 2016, she ran as a candidate for mayor of the commune of Punta Arenas representing the Movimiento Autonomista Magallanes, but was not elected.

In the elections held on 7 May 2023, she ran as a candidate for the Constitutional Council representing the 15th electoral district of the Magallanes and Chilean Antarctic Region, as a member of Convergencia Social within the Unidad para Chile electoral pact. According to the Electoral Court (TRICEL), she was elected with 9,828 votes.
