= Sebastián Parraguez =

Chilean constituent

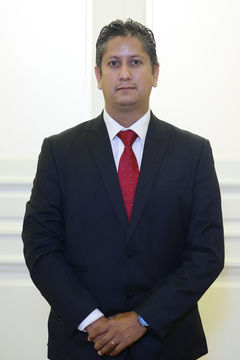

Member of the Constitutional Council
- In office 7 June 2023 – 7 November 2023
- Constituency: Antofagasta Region

Personal details
- Born: 19 January 1987 (age 39) Santiago, Chile
- Party: Republican Party
- Spouse: Jasna Carrillanca
- Children: Two
- Education: Santo Tomás University, Chile
- Occupation: Politician
- Profession: Kinesiologist

Sebastián Esteban Parraguez González (born 19 January 1987) is a Chilean politician who served in the Constitutional Council.

== Biography ==
Parraguez was born in Santiago on 19 January 1987. His parents, Luis René Parraguez Guzmán and María Delfina González Cariz, are both members of the Carabineros de Chile.

At the age of eight, he moved with his family to Iquique, where he currently resides. He married Jasna Lissette Carrillanca Ainol on 20 January 2021 in Iquique, and they have two daughters, Darling and Ema.

He completed his primary education at Colegio Sagrada Familia in Tocopilla and Colegio Adventista in Iquique, and his secondary education at Colegio Inglés de Iquique.

He studied kinesiology at the Universidad Santo Tomás in its Iquique and Santiago campuses, graduating in 2016. He has also worked as a lecturer in the field of health sciences and is currently pursuing an MBA in Health Management at the Universidad Andrés Bello.

=== Professional career ===
Since 2016, Parraguez has developed his professional practice in Iquique as a kinesiologist. He promoted a community-based medical clinic in the commune of Alto Hospicio, focused on providing therapeutic services.

During the 2019 social unrest, he offered professional assistance primarily to members of the Carabineros and the Investigations Police of Chile (PDI).

== Political career ==
In the elections held on 7 May 2023, Parraguez ran as a candidate for the Constitutional Council representing the Republican Party of Chile for the 2nd Circumscription of the Tarapacá Region.

He was elected with 15,284 votes.
