= Aldo Sanhueza =

Chilean constituent

Personal details
- Born: 17 October 1992 (age 33) Coronel, Chile
- Party: Republican Party
- Education: Andres Bello National University
- Occupation: Politician
- Profession: Economist

Aldo Sanhueza Carrera (born 17 October 1992) is a Chilean politician.

== Biography ==
He was born in Coronel on 17 October 1992. He is the son of Dino Aldo Sanhueza Martínez and Luz de Fátima Carrera Avilés.

He completed his primary education and secondary studies up to the second year of high school at the Liceo Enrique Molina Garmendia. In 2011, he obtained his secondary education certificate after graduating from the Instituto CEIA Janequeo in Concepción.

Between 2014 and 2018, he studied business administration at Andrés Bello National University (UNAB). Between May 2022 and May 2023, he completed a diploma in Business Administration and Management at the Pontifical Catholic University of Chile.

Between January 2014 and March 2017, he worked as manager and administrator at Hotel Puerto Nuevo in Lake Ranco. Later, between April 2019 and December 2021, he served as commercial relations manager at Seysa Consultores SpA in Concepción.

== Political career ==
He began his political activity as a student leader during his university years. Between May 2015 and April 2017, he served as president of the student council of the Business Administration program at UNAB, and between June 2017 and September 2018, he was president of the university's student federation (FEV–UNAB).

For more than ten years, he has been involved in projects with community organizations, including volunteer initiatives with NGOs such as Techo para Chile and Alma Chile. He has been a member of the Latin American Network of Young People for Democracy since April 2018.

He was a member of the Republican Party of Chile, where he served as undersecretary from June 2020 until 10 May 2023, when he resigned from the party.

In the elections held on 7 May 2023, he ran as a candidate for the Constitutional Council representing the 10th constituency —Biobío Region―, as a member of the Republican Party electoral pact. According to the Electoral Court of Chile, he was elected with 109,397 votes.

On 26 May 2023, he submitted a petition to the Electoral Court of Chile seeking to resign from his position as Councillor, which was rejected. Despite this, he did not attend the inaugural session of the Constitutional Council and therefore did not formally assume the office.
