= María Pardo (lawyer) =

Chilean constituent

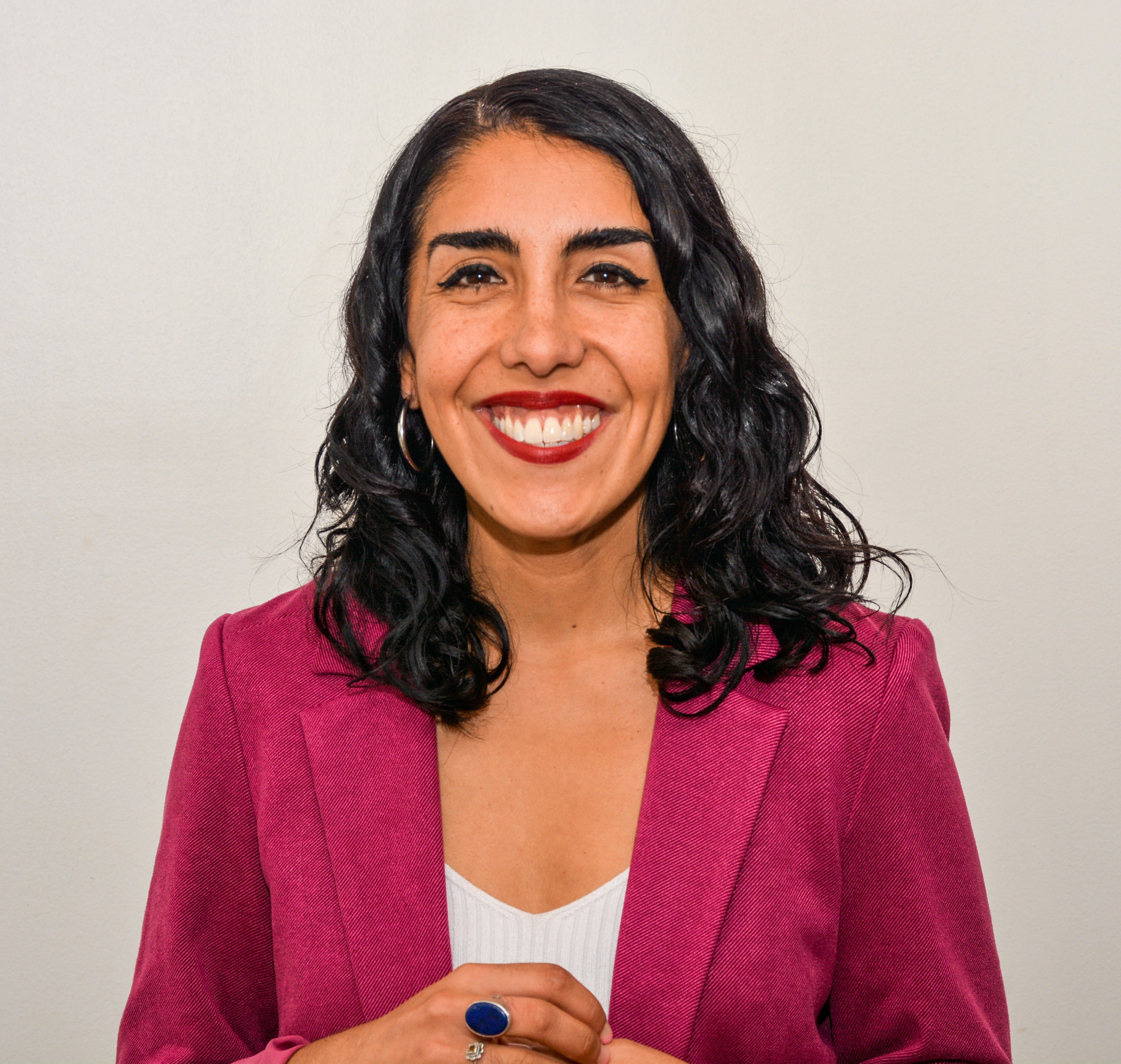

Member of the Constitutional Convention
- In office 7 June 2023 – 7 November 2023
- Constituency: 6th Circumscription

Personal details
- Born: 3 June 1988 (age 38) Viña del Mar, Chile
- Party: Social Convergence (CS)
- Education: Pontifical Catholic University of Valparaíso (LL.B / PhD)
- Occupation: Politician
- Profession: Lawyer

María Pardo Vergara (born 3 June 1988) is a Chilean lawyer who is a member of the Constitutional Council of Chile.

She has worked as a professor at various universities in the Valparaíso Region, including her alma mater or the Playa Ancha University.

== Biography ==
Pardo completed her primary and secondary education at St Margaret's School, from which she graduated in 2006. Then, Pardo joined the Pontifical Catholic University of Valparaíso (PUCV), where she studied law. She graduated in 2012, swearing in as a lawyer on March 13, 2015.

In March 2023, she obtained a Ph.D. at her same alma mater. Similarly, in the context of her doctoral studies, she carried out research internships at the Cambridge Forum for Legal and Political Philosophy at the University of Cambridge in England, as well as at the Legal Theory Group at the University of Glasgow in Scotland.
