= Ivonne Mangelsdorff =

Chilean constituent

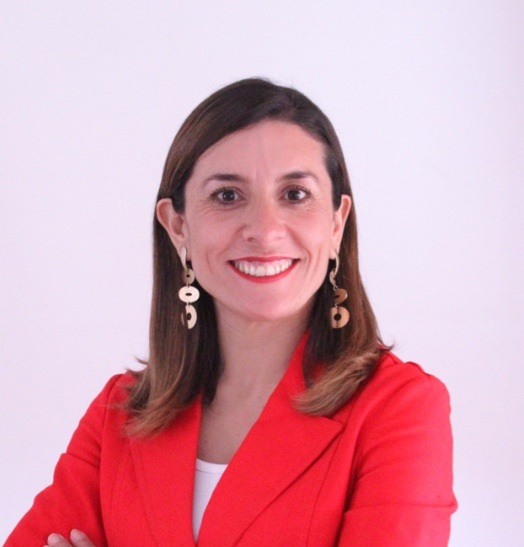

Member of the Constitutional Council
- In office 7 June 2023 – 7 November 2023
- Constituency: O'Higgins Region (8th)

Provincial Governor of Cachapoal
- In office 11 March 2018 – 11 April 2020
- Appointed by: Sebastián Piñera
- Preceded by: Mirenchu Beitía
- Succeeded by: Felipe Uribe

Personal details
- Born: 23 May 1975 (age 51) Rancagua, Chile
- Party: National Renewal (RN)
- Parent(s): Gunther Mangelsdorff; Ivone Galeb
- Education: University for Development (BA); Andrés Bello National University (MA)
- Occupation: Politician
- Profession: Journalist

Ivonne Mangelsdorff Galeb (born 23 May 1975) is a Chilean politician who served as member of the Constitutional Council.

== Biography ==
She was born in Rancagua on 23 May 1975. She is the daughter of Gunther Mangelsdorff Valenzuela and Ivonne Galeb Simon.

She is the mother of two daughters.

=== Professional career ===
Mangelsdorff completed her secondary education at the Colegio Sagrado Corazón in Rancagua, graduating in 1992. She later studied journalism at the University for Development, where she graduated in 2005. She subsequently enrolled in law at Andrés Bello University, obtaining a licentiate degree in Legal Sciences in 2007. She was admitted to the bar on 13 April 2009.

In 2006, she served as a teaching assistant for the courses Middle East and Asia in the 21st Century at the University of Development. The following year, she worked as a legal and communications adviser at the law firm Arthur, Hinzpeter, Pizarro, Humeres & Cía. Between 2009 and 2010, she was an associate lawyer at the Rodt Notary Office in Rancagua. Between May and September 2010, she taught courses in Labour Law, Procedural Law, and Civil Law at INACAP.

Between 2010 and 2011, she worked as an associate lawyer at the law firm Medel, Moreno & Asociados. In June 2010, she assumed the position of Chief of Staff to the Regional Director of the National Board of Kindergartens (JUNJI) in the O'Higgins Region.

Since September 2015, she has worked as a lawyer at BBO & Cía. From May 2020 onward, she has served as Coordinator of the Division of Political and Institutional Relations at the Ministry General Secretariat of the Presidency.

== Political career ==
In October 2011, she was appointed Regional Ministerial Secretary (SEREMI) of Labour for the Metropolitan Region of Santiago during the first administration of President Sebastián Piñera.

In the 2017 parliamentary elections, she ran as a candidate for the Chamber of Deputies of Chile in District No. 15 of the O'Higgins Region, representing the National Renewal party within the Chile Vamos coalition. She obtained 2,426 votes, equivalent to 1.34% of the valid votes cast, and was not elected. Between 11 March 2018 and 10 April 2020, she served as Governor of Cachapoal Province. In November 2021, she again ran in the same district but was not elected, obtaining 2,324 votes, corresponding to 1.17% of the total valid votes.

In the elections held on 7 May 2023, she ran as a candidate for the Constitutional Council representing the 8th electoral district of the O'Higgins Region, as a member of the National Renewal party within the Chile Seguro electoral pact. According to the Electoral Qualification Court (TRICEL), she was elected with 9,256 votes.
