= Temuco Catholic University =

University

Coordinates: 38°44′14″S 72°36′02″W

Catholic University of Temuco
- Universidad Católica de Temuco
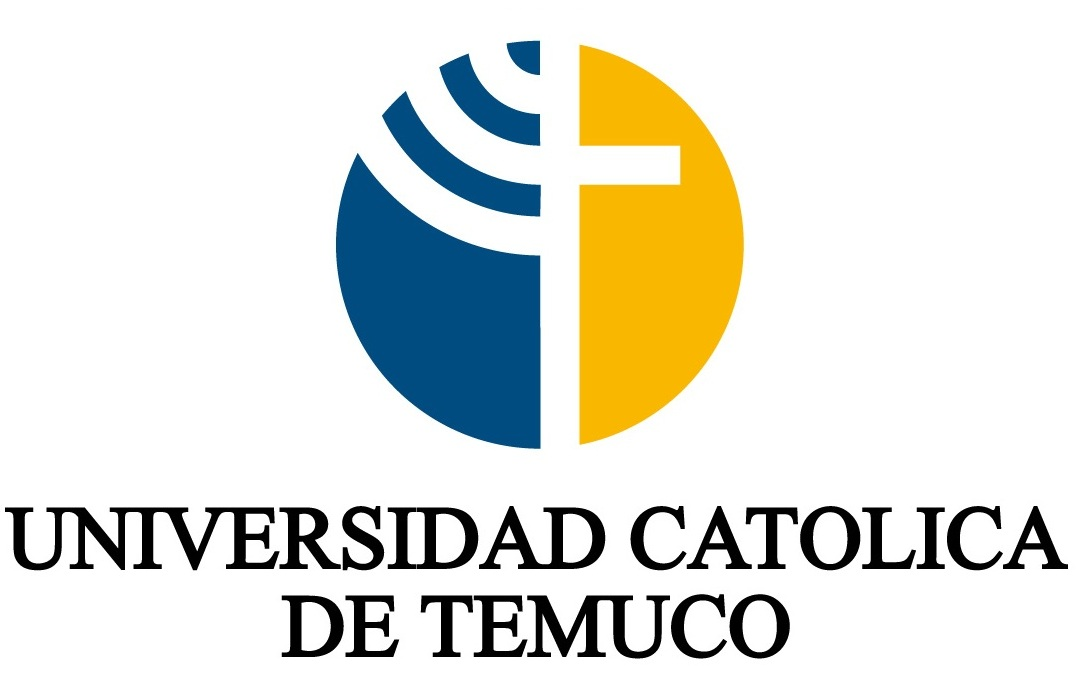
- Type: Public Catholic
- Established: July 10, 1991
- Affiliations: Chilean Traditional Universities
- Chancellor: Monseñor Héctor Vargas Bastidas
- Rector: Dr. Aliro Bórquez Ramírez
- Students: 11,879 (2020)
- Undergraduates: 11,560
- Postgraduates: 319
- Location: Temuco, Chile
- Website: www.uct.cl

Catholic University of Temuco (Spanish: Universidad Católica de Temuco) is a university in Chile. It is a derivative university part of the Chilean Traditional Universities.
