= Catholic University of the Maule =

University in Maule, Chile

Coordinates: 35.4354°S 71.6196°W

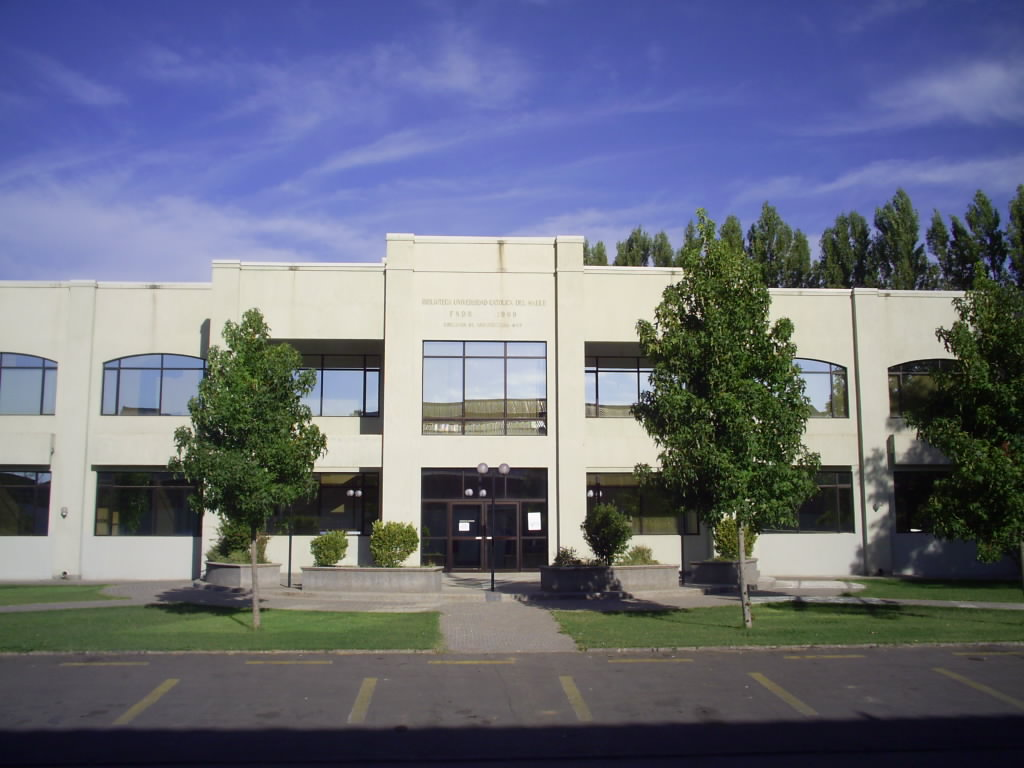

Catholic University of Maule (Spanish: Universidad Católica del Maule, UCM) is a university in Maule, Chile. It is a derivative university part of the Chilean Traditional Universities.

This university was created in 1991, in what was the former Talca campus of Pontifical Catholic University of Chile.

It also has a campus in Curico.
