= Bolivarian University of Chile =

Educational institution in Chile

Coordinates: 33.440554°S 70.661216°W

- Universidad Bolivariana de Chile
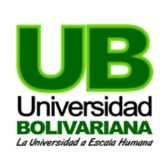
- Type: private
- Established: 27 August 1987
- Location: Chile
- Website: www.ubolivariana.cl

The Bolivarian University of Chile (Spanish: Universidad Bolivariana de Chile) is a Chilean university established in 1987. It has around 7000 students.

The university obtained functional autonomy in 2002. Before this date, graduates had to submit to an examination by the Chilean Board of Education in order to have their degree validated. Currently, all degrees granted from the university are fully recognized by the Chilean government without additional requirements. Individual majors are accredited, and the institution is in the process of seeking a wider institutional accreditation.
