= ARCIS University =

Private university in Chile (1982-2021)

University of Art & Social Sciences
- Universidad de Arte y Ciencias Sociales
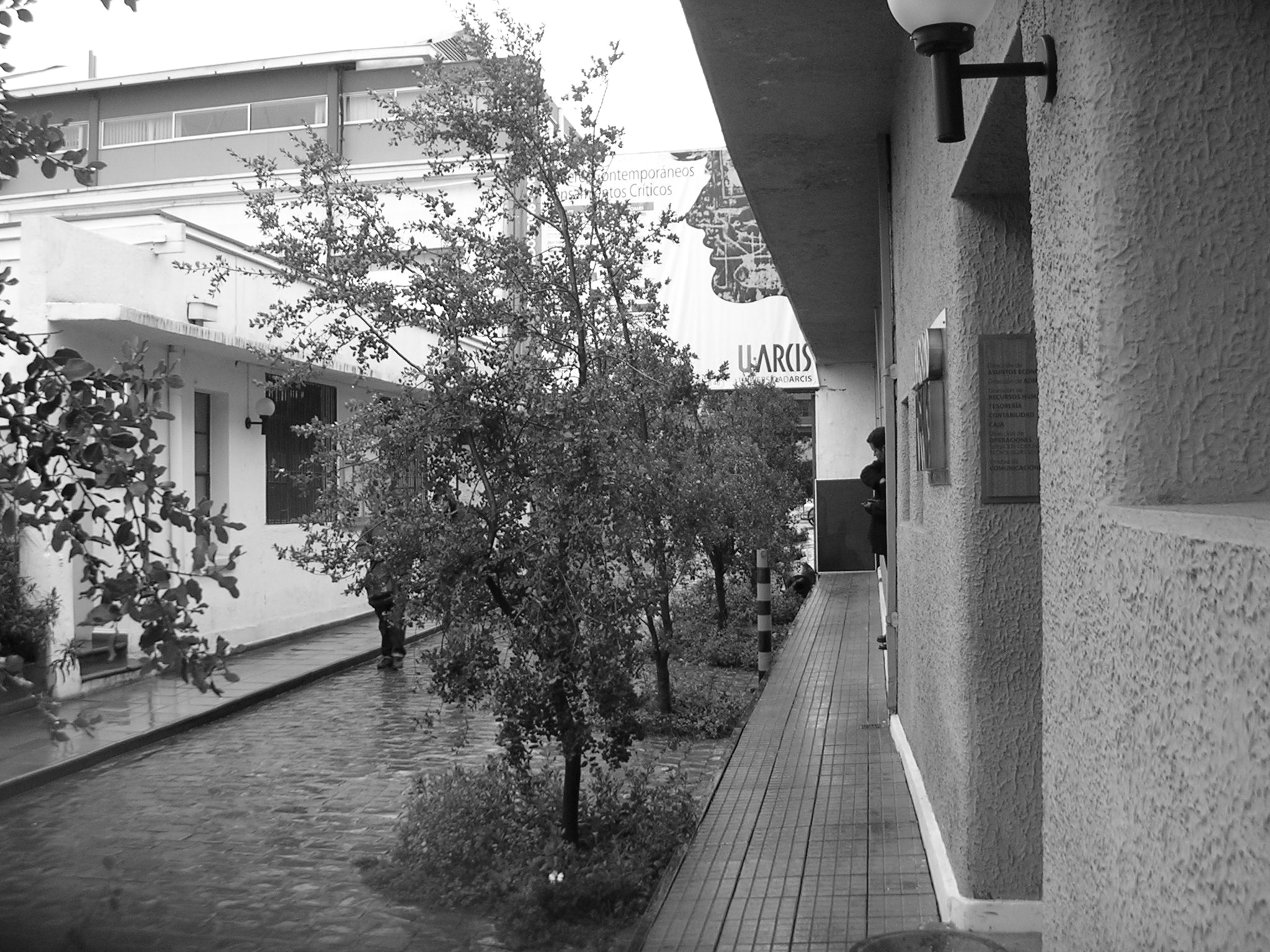
- View of UARCIS
- Active: March 31, 1982–January 31, 2021
- Location: Santiago de Chile, Chile
- Website: www.uarcis.cl

University of Art & Social Sciences (Spanish: Universidad de Arte y Ciencias Sociales - UARCIS) was a private university in Chile. It was founded on 1982 and the headquarters were in Santiago de Chile.
