= University of the Bío Bío =

University in Chile

University of Bio-Bio
- Universidad del Bio-Bio
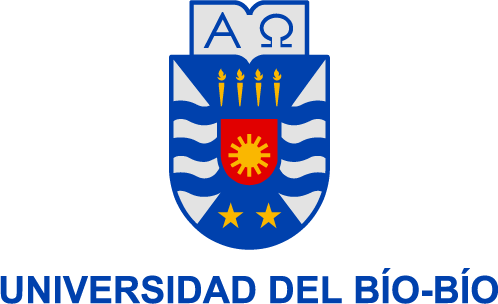
- Heraldry University of Bio-Bio
- Motto: La Universidad de la Región del Bío - Bío
- Motto in English: The University of the region of Bio - Bio
- Type: Public
- Established: April 9, 1947
- Rector: Dr. Benito Umaña Hermosilla
- Students: 12,775
- Undergraduates: 12,441
- Postgraduates: 334
- Location: Concepción, Biobío Region, Chile; 36°49′20″S 73°0′45″W
- Campus: Campus Concepción (Concepción) Campus Fernando May (Chillán) Campus La Castilla (Chillán)
- Colors: Blue Gray
- Nickname: UBB
- Website: www.ubiobio.cl (in spanish)

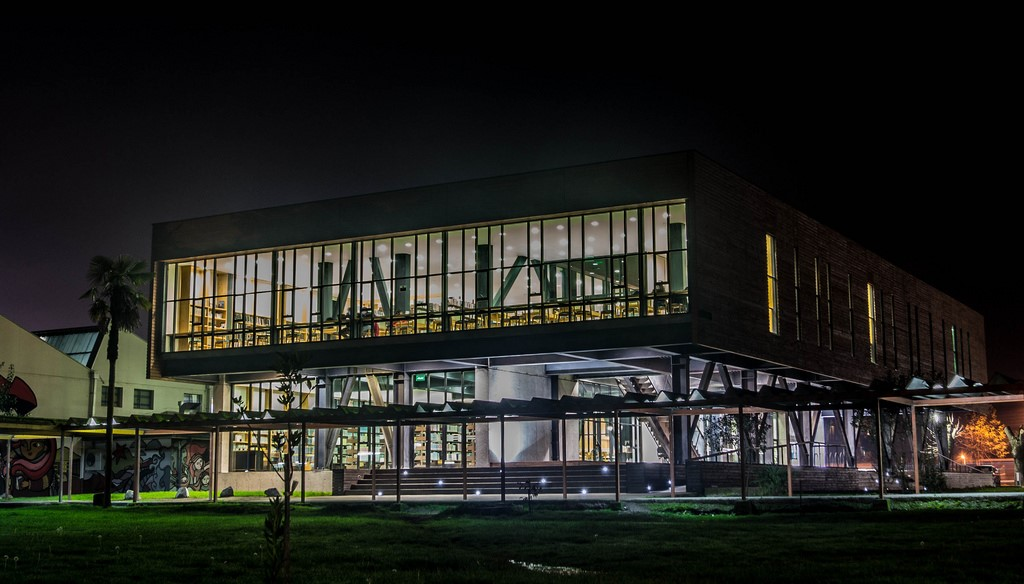
University of Bío-Bío Library (2018)

University of Biobío (Spanish: Universidad del Biobío) is a university in Chile. It is part of the Chilean Traditional Universities.

The University of Biobío is the heir of the tradition of public higher education in the Biobío Region. Its roots go back to the creation of the Technical University of the State (TUS) on April 9, 1947, and to the Ñuble Campus of the University of Chile. Then the Concepción Campus of the TUS and the campus from Chillán, derived in the Biobío University and the Chillán Professional Institute, originating what today is called the UBB.

With offices in Concepción and Chillán, it offers 35 undergraduate degrees and two bachelor programs, with over 12,000 students and almost 70 percent of its professors hold masters or PhD grade.

== Faculties ==
The university has six faculties:

- Architecture, Construction, and Design, whose labor includes Architecture, Urbanism, Construction Sciences, Visual Communication and Industrial Design. It stands out in issues such as the use of wood, development of constructive materials, urban planning and conservation of architectonic patrimony.
- Sciences, which besides teaching basic sciences classes, the Bachelor in Natural and Exact Sciences and the Statistic Engineering undergraduate program, promotes training and update activities for teachers. It organizes the National Science and Technology Fair to develop scientific interest in kids and youngsters.
- Engineering, working through the departments of Electric and Electronic, Wood, Mechanic, Civil and Civil Industrial Engineering. Its main development lines are production systems and science and technology of wood and its derivatives.
- Education and Humanities, whose activities are concentrated in education for development and development of regional identity. Focused on the formation of teachers, assumes the challenge of strengthening the teaching profession, improving initial formation and the improvement of staff. It also offers Social Work and Psychology programs.
- Health and Food Sciences, oriented towards science and technology in the area of food, applied nutrition and community health. It promotes research, improvement and scientific and technological aid to the professional work and quality control of productive processes, business administration and services of its speciality.
- Business Administration, whose main objective is the development of management and information areas, emphasizing in the areas of management, accounting and auditing, economy and finance, tax management, regional development, agribusiness, computing sciences and information technologies. It is also interested in strengthening the entrepreneur capacity of its students.

== Research, development, and innovation ==
Supported by external organizations, the university has developed projects in fields such as fundamental sciences, simulation of industrial processes and services, science and technology of wood and food, materials and constructive technologies, biotechnology and education for development. It has a business incubator that backs the startup of innovative business projects.

To satisfy the demands of the media and to strengthen its ties with society, UBB has multidisciplinary centers dedicated to research and development in areas such as urban regional studies, computing and educational informatics, housing quality and advanced polymers. It has specialized laboratories in the areas of composite materials, manufacture and quality control of food, urbanism, and automated manufacture systems. It promotes public policy and public health management programs.

In 1998 the UBB created the High Technology Wood Center, providing technological aid to the industry.

== Extension and international relations ==
The university carries out artistic and cultural activities through its Extension Center in Chillán, its exposition room in Concepción and through its artistic groups and Music School.

In international affairs, the UBB promotes professor and student exchange and the development of joint projects with foreign academic and scientific entities. It has subscribed to over 130 agreements that link it with institutions of several countries, mainly in Europe and America.
