= Constitutional Council (Chile) =

Chilean constituent assembly elected in 2023

The Constitutional Council in Chile was tasked to draft a new constitution in 2023, submitted to referendum on 17 December 2023. The Constitutional Council was selected by the citizens in an election on 7 May 2023. Councillor Beatriz Hevia was elected President of the Council by her peers on June 7.

== Background ==
The 2022 Chilean national plebiscite was held on 4 September 2022, in order to determine whether the public agreed with the text of a new Political Constitution of the Republic drawn up by the Constitutional Convention. It was commonly referred to as the "exit plebiscite" (plebiscito de salida).

The proposed constitution, which had faced "intense criticism that it was too long, too left-wing and too radical", was rejected by a margin of 62% to 38%.

Boric announced a new process for drafting a new constitution, with Al Jazeera writing, "Most Chileans and their politicians have agreed the constitution that dates from the dictatorship must change." Boric called on the heads of all political parties for a meeting on Monday, 5 September, to chart a path forward. As a result of the rejection, the incumbent 1980 Constitution will remain in force, with The Guardian writing that "Chile's future looks decidedly uncertain," and that, "Boric has expressed a willingness to repeat the constitutional process, but the basis for reform is still very much up for debate." Colombian president Gustavo Petro lamented the win of the rejection vote, considering that Chile had decided to "revive Augusto Pinochet".

The Economist considered that "common sense" had led Chileans to reject the proposed constitution, in what was described as a "blow" for the government of Gabriel Boric.

In the aftermath of the plebiscite the internal division that the Christian Democratic Party's official support for the "Approve" option had created resurfaced, with various calls for a renewed leadership, and some calling for the expulsion of members who had supported the "Reject" option.

=== Agreement for Chile ===
Chilean lawmakers announced in December 2022 an agreement to begin drafting a new constitution, three months after a referendum overwhelmingly rejected a progressive first text to replace the 1980 constitution. It was named Agreement for Chile. It was submitted for referendum in December in 2023. It comes after Chileans in September 2022 voted against the proposal of a left-wing constitution, leading to President Gabriel Boric reshuffling his cabinet.

A bipartisan agreement was made for a new constitution. The Republican Party and the Party of the People did not participate in the agreement.

It was agreed that the Expert Commission was to work on a first draft from 6 March to 6 June. The Constitutional Council then had to begin its work thirty days after its election, on 6 June 2023 and was to deliver the draft Constitution five months later by 6 November. A mandatory referendum was then held to be held either on November or December 2023. The proposed constitution was rejected.

Senate President Alvaro Elizalde, announced; "Today a new path has opened to progress towards a Constitution born from democracy." The agreement proposed a parity between men and women, participation from indigenous peoples and that the proposals would need to be approved by three-fifths of the advisors. Unlike the previous convention, there will be no quota of seats reserved for Indigenous peoples. The agreement set UP for the new proposed constitution to be drafted over 2023 by a body of 51 so-called constitutional advisors elected by direct vote on 7 May 2023, based on a preliminary draft prepared by a commission of 24 experts from an Expert Commission. As per the agreement, the Expert Commission was formed in March 2023, its 24 members chosen by Congress on behalf of the different pro-government and opposition groups.

== Election and installation ==
The election to determine the seats of the Constitutional Council was held on May 7, 2023. The Council was officially installed on June 7, 2023. Beatriz Hevia (PRCh) was elected as the president of the Council with 33 votes, while Aldo Valle (PS) was elected as the vice president with 17 votes. Aldo Sanhueza (PRCh), who had previously been elected, decided not to take his seat due to revelations of his involvement in a sexual abuse incident in 2019. As a result, the Council consisted of 50 members.
