= List of political groups by country =

This is a list of political groups by country. A political group, also known as a political alliance, coalition or bloc, is cooperation by members of different political parties on a common agenda. This usually involves formal agreements between two or more entire parties. A political group is usually especially beneficial to the parties concerned during and immediately after elections – due to characteristics of the electoral systems concerned (e.g. allowing each party to clear electoral thresholds) and/or allowing parties to participate in the formation of a government after elections. These may break up quickly or hold together for decades, becoming the de facto norm, operating almost as a single unit. Political groups may also form prior to elections to reduce uncertainty following the election.

Coalition governments are formed when a political group comes to power or when only a plurality (not a majority) has been reached, and several parties must work together to govern. One of the peculiarities of such a method of governance results in a minister without portfolio.

== Political groups by country ==
=== Australia ===
Name	Member Parties	Ideology	Years Active
Liberal-National Coalition	Liberal, National	Centre-right	2026-Present (Note: In its current form)

=== Bulgaria ===
Name	Member Parties	Ideology	Years Active
BSP - United Left	Agrarian Union "Aleksandar Stamboliyski", Alternative for Bulgarian Revival, Bulgarian Socialist Party, Communist Party of Bulgaria, Bulgarian Social Democracy - EuroLeft, Ecoglasnost, European Security and Integration, Movement for Social Humanism, Political Club "Thrace", Rise (Bulgarian political party), Union for the Fatherland	Centre-Left	2024-Present (Note: In its current form)
United Democratic Forces	Bulgarian Agrarian People's Union, Democratic Party, George's Day Movement, Movement for an Equal Public Model, National Association - Bulgarian Agrarian People's Union, Radical Democratic Party, Union of Democratic Forces	Centre-Right	1997-2005
Blue Coalition	Bulgarian Social Democratic Party, Democrats for a Strong Bulgaria, Radical Democratic Party in Bulgaria, Union of Democratic Forces, United Agrarians	Centre-Right	2009-2012
Reformist Bloc	Bulgaria for Citizens Movement, Bulgarian Agrarian National Union, Bulgarian New Democracy, People's Party "Freedom and Dignity", Union of Democratic Forces	Centre-Right	2013-2016/17
Democratic Bulgaria	Democrats for a Strong Bulgaria, Yes, Bulgaria!	Centre-Right	2018-Present

=== Chile ===
Name	Member Parties	Ideology	Years Active
Chile Vamos	Democratic Independent Regionalist Party, Independent Democratic Union, National Renewal, Political Evolution	Centre-right to right-wing	2015-Present (Note: In its current form)
Frente Amplio	Comunes, Democratic Popular Movement, Democratic Revolution, Equality Party, Green Ecologist Party, Humanist Party, Liberal Party, Libertarian Left, País, Social Convergence	Left-wing	2017-2024
Unidad para Chile	Comunes, Communist Party of Chile, Democratic Revolution, Humanist Action, Liberal Party of Chile, Social Convergence, Social Green Regionalist Federation, Socialist Party of Chile	Left-wing	2023
Unidad por Chile	Broad Front, Christian Democratic Party, Communist Party of Chile, Liberal Party of Chile, Party for Democracy, Radical Party of Chile, Socialist Party of Chile	Centre-left to far-left	2022-Present
Nueva Mayoría	Christian Democratic Party, Citizen Left, Communist Party, MAS Region, Party for Democracy, Social Democrat Radical Party, Socialist Party	Centre-left	2013-2018
Progressive Convergence	Party for Democracy, Social Democrat Radical Party, Socialist Party	Centre to centre-left	2018-2020
Constituent Unity	Christian Democratic Party, Citizens, Liberal Party, New Deal, Party for Democracy, Progressive Party, Radical Party, Socialist Party	Centre to centre-left	2020-2021
New Social Pact	Christian Democratic Party, Citizens, Liberal Party, New Deal, Party for Democracy, Radical Party, Socialist Party	Centre to centre-left	2021
Democratic Socialism	Liberal Party of Chile, New Deal, Party for Democracy, Radical Party, Socialist Party	Centre-left	2021-Present
Everything for Chile	Christian Democratic Party, Party for Democracy, Radical party of Chile	Centre to centre-left	2023-Present

=== Germany ===
The Christian Democratic Union of Germany does not contest elections in Bavaria, where its place is taken by the somewhat more conservative and Catholic-influenced Christian Social Union. They form a common CDU/CSU bloc in the Bundestag. According to the parliamentary law only parties which share a common ideology and do not compete in the same state are allowed to form a joint Fraktion, conditions only applying to CDU/CSU. Only in 1976, the coalition broke for less than a month.

Between the 1980s and the 2010s, Germany was dominated by two blocs, the "bourgeois" black-yellow coalition composed of the Union and Free Democratic Party and the red–green alliance composed of the Social Democratic Party and The Greens. In 2002, FDP nominated their own chancellor candidate against the candidates of SPD and CDU before returning to the alliance with the CDU/CSU. This was the first and only election before 2021 to have three candidates.

=== Hong Kong ===
The Hong Kong pro-democracy camp has been establishing an electoral coalition in local level elections. Unless there is a coordination failure, the parties within the camp will not contest against each other in local level elections. In the coming general election, they also launch primaries to ensure the greatest coordination and thus greatest possible number of seats, at best a simple majority (35+) can be achieved.

=== Hungary ===
The Christian Democratic People's Party is the coalition partner of the ruling party Fidesz, and has run with Fidesz on a joint electoral list in elections since 2006. However, over time the party has lost popular support to the point it can no longer be measured in opinion polls, and today effectively operates as a satellite party of Fidesz, with the last time it got into parliament on its own being in 1994.

=== Israel ===
Since the 1977 Israeli legislative election, the nationalist and ultra-Orthodox parties have formed the National camp. The Zionist parties outside of the camp are usually seen as their own bloc.

=== Liechtenstein ===
The two dominating likewise conservative parties Progressive Citizens' Party and Patriotic Union form a coalition which exists since 1938 with a short hiatus in 1997–2005.

=== New Zealand ===
ACT New Zealand, a right-wing libertarian party, runs its leader as a candidate in the Epsom electorate. In Epsom, the ACT leader is typically endorsed by the National Party and its leader. After the election, the ACT leader can then be offered a cabinet position, and the party can serve as a coalition partner in a National government.

=== Peru ===
Political alliances in Peru include:

- Broad Front (Peru)
- Democratic Bloc (Peru)
- National Unity (Peru, 2025)
- Together for Peru

=== Portugal ===
In Portugal, the Democratic Alliance is an alliance of three centre-right to right-wing parties: PSD, CDS-PP and PPM. It was based on the Democratic Alliance in 1979 and PSD and CDS-PP formed Força Portugal in 2004, the Portugal Alliance in 2014 and the Portugal Ahead alliance in 2015. There are also smaller alliances, such as the CDU.

=== Scandinavian countries ===
In multiple countries in Scandinavia, parties generally run in elections separately but cooperate with other parties of similar ideology and outlook, and are grouped together by media, commentators, and party members for the purposes of the formation of a coalition government: a "red" bloc of centre-left and left-wing parties, and a "blue" bloc of centre-right and right-wing parties. Parties almost always form coalition governments consisting of their particular bloc if they have a majority, with the largest party nominating the position of Prime Minister.

In the last few years, there have been some changes. The Frederiksen II Cabinet formed in Denmark in 2022 includes both the "red" Social Democracy and the "blue" Venstre. In 2019, the Swedish Centre Party left the conservative Alliance and the other "blue" parties ended the cordon sanitaire against the far-right Sweden Democrats. Although the Faroe Islands and Finland traditionally do not have blocs, all governments were mostly along political lines since Cabinet of Kaj Leo Johannesen II in 2011 and the Sipilä cabinet in 2015 respectively.

Political camps as reported in opinion polls
Country	Green-Left	Green	Social Democratic	Agrarian (historically)	Liberal	Conservative	Christian democratic	Right-wing	Source
Denmark	Ø, F	Å	A	V	B, M, I	C		Æ, O, H	
Faroe Islands	E		C	B	F, D	A	H		
Norway	R, SV	MDG	Ap	Sp	V	H	KrF	FrP	
Sweden	V	MP	S	C	L	M	KD	SD	

=== United Kingdom ===
==== Labour Party ====
The Labour Party and Co-operative Party have an electoral agreement under which elections in some constituencies are contested by Co-operative Party members as joint candidates.

==== Northern Ireland ====
Two of the three largest national parties do not actively contest elections in Northern Ireland. The two Northern Irish parties that are affiliated with parties that compete in the rest of the UK are the Social Democratic and Labour Party with Labour, and the Alliance Party of Northern Ireland with the Liberal Democrats. The Conservative Party runs candidates in Northern Ireland but used to support the Ulster Unionist Party.

=== Other countries ===
- Indonesia: Advanced Indonesia Coalition
- Argentina: Workers' Left Front – Unity, La Libertad Avanza, Homeland Force
- Armenia: Civil Contract
- Croatia: Rivers of Justice
- Gibraltar: GSLP–Liberal Alliance
- India: National Democratic Alliance (NDA), Indian National Developmental Inclusive Alliance (INDIA)
- Ireland: People Before Profit–Solidarity
- Italy: Centre-left coalition, Centre-right coalition
- Latvia: Union of Greens and Farmers
- Lebanon: March 8 Alliance
- Malaysia: Alliance of Hope (PH), Barisan Nasional (BN), Perikatan Nasional (PN), Gabungan Rakyat Sabah Party (GRS), Gabungan Parti Sarawak (GPS)
- Poland: The Left
- Serbia: Serbia Must Not Stop
- Republic of China/Taiwan: Pan-Blue Coalition, Pan-Green Coalition

=== Defunct political groups ===
- Argentina: Frente de Todos, Juntos por el Cambio
- Armenia: My Step Alliance, Way Out Alliance, We Alliance, Bright Alliance, ORO Alliance, Dignified Yerevan
- Bolivia: Civic Community, Creemos (Note: Became a political party in 2020)
- France: Union for French Democracy, Federation of the Democratic and Socialist Left, Union of the Right and Centre
- Greece: Coalition of the Radical Left (Note: Became a political party in 2012)
- Hungary: Unity, United for Hungary
- India: Third Front, United Front, United Progressive Alliance
- Israel: Alignment, Gahal, One Israel, National Union
- Italy: Pole for Freedoms, House of Freedoms, The Olive Tree, The Union, Italia. Bene Comune
- Lebanon: March 14 Alliance
- Moldova: Alliance for Democracy and Reforms, Alliance for European Integration
- Montenegro: European Montenegro
- Poland: Solidarity Electoral Action, Left and Democrats, United Left
- Romania: Social Democratic Pole, Justice and Truth Alliance, Social Liberal Union, USR PLUS, National Coalition for Romania, Romania Forward Electoral Alliance
- Serbia: Democratic Opposition of Serbia, For a European Serbia, Choice for a Better Life, Alliance for Serbia, United Opposition of Serbia, United for the Victory of Serbia, Serbia Against Violence

== See also ==
- Coalition government
- Electoral alliance
- Fraternal party
- Popular front
- Red–green alliance
- United front
- Umbrella organization
- Alliance
- Coalition
