= 2023 Chilean Constitutional Council election =

- 7 May 2023
- 50 general seats and 0 to 2 indigenous seats in the Constitutional Council
- Turnout: 84.91%
Party	Vote %	Seats
Republican Party	34.34	23
Unity for Chile	27.73	16
Safe Chile	20.42	11
Indigenous list	3.03	1
This lists parties that won seats. See the complete results below.

Constitutional Council elections were held in Chile on 7 May 2023. Voting was compulsory, and resulted in an electoral victory for right-wing parties, passing the threshold of a three-fifths majority of constitutional council members to freely draft a new constitution, removing the veto option from left-wing members. This marked a sharp shift from a left-wing majority that freely drafted a rejected first constitutional rewrite in 2021 and was described as a political loss for President Gabriel Boric.

The elections came in response to the rejection of a proposed constitutional draft in a national referendum held in September 2022. Following the defeat of the draft, a multiparty agreement was reached to restart the process, which was subsequently ratified by Congress via a constitutional amendment. The new Constitutional Council was modeled after the Senate and consisted of 50 members, elected by regions. Additionally, the council had an equal number of men and women. The drafted constitution was rejected in a referendum later in 2023.

== Background ==
On 4 September 2022, a national plebiscite known as the "exit plebiscite" was held to determine whether voters agreed with the new Political Constitution of the Republic drafted by the Constitutional Convention earlier that year. The proposed constitution, which had faced "intense criticism that it was too long, too left-wing and too radical", was rejected by a margin of 62% to 38%. It was considered one of the world’s most progressive constitutions, but many voters found it too polarising, and controversies mired the process. Therefore, the current 1980 Constitution continued to be in effect.

=== Agreement for Chile ===
Lawmakers announced the "Agreement for Chile" in December 2022, as a second attempt to draft a new constitution with different rules. The agreement states that a group of 50 directly-elected constitutional advisors will draft the constitution based on a preliminary draft prepared by a commission of 24 experts appointed by Congress. Additionally, a 14-member body appointed by Congress will ensure that the proposed text aligns with the 12 institutional and fundamental principles outlined in the agreement.

The agreement was reached on 12 December 2022, and ratified by the right-wing Congress a month later, with the Republican Party and the Party of the People not participating in the agreement while agreeing to participate in the elections. This new system would involve two councils; a Congress-elected Council of Experts and a popular election of a Constitutional Council. In this first phase on 25 January 2022, Congress chose members on the Council of Experts. Independent Democratic Union politician Hernán Larraín, who previously supported the Pinochet dictatorship was chosen to head the Council of Experts to draft the new constitution.

Council members would be directly elected in May, with equal representation of men and women and the participation of indigenous peoples. A three-fifths majority vote in the Council is required to approve articles, which is lower than the two-thirds majority required in the previous convention. Unlike the previous convention, the number of seats reserved for indigenous representatives was not fixed; rather, it will depend on the number of votes they receive. The commission's work period on the first draft was set from 6 March to 6 June, and the Constitutional Council would commence its work thirty days after its election on 6 June 2023. The council was given a deadline to deliver the draft constitution by 6 November, and a mandatory referendum was set to be held on 17 December 2023.

== Electoral system ==
The general 50 seats in the Constitutional Council were elected in the same manner as members of the Senate of Chile, which is multi-member proportional representation (D'Hondt method) with open lists in constituencies of between two and five seats corresponding to the regions. As in the previous constituent body, there will be additional seats reserved for indigenous peoples, but this time they will be based on their percentage of votes, and not according to a number set in advance by ethnic group. There is also gender parity required, in which the lists presented by the parties alternate male and female candidates, with measures in place to adjust should the election result in an imbalance (the final chamber must contain 25 men and 25 women).

== Contesting parties and coalitions ==
Coalition		Parties	Ideology	Political position	Previous election		Candidates	
Coalition		Parties	Ideology	Political position	% Votes	Seats	Number	Regions
	Unity for Chile; Unidad para Chile	List: Broad Front (FA) – Social Convergence (CS) – Democratic Revolution (RD) – Commons (Comunes); Chile Digno (ChD) – Communist Party (PCCh) – Social Green Regionalist Federation (FRVS) – Humanist Action (AH); Socialist Party (PS); Liberal Party (PL)	Democratic socialism	Left-wing	24.83% (Note: Results for Apruebo Dignidad (18.74%, 28 seats), PS (4.84%, 15 seats) and PPD (2.58%, 3 seats) in the 2021 election.)	46 / 155		
	Safe Chile; Chile Seguro	List: Chile Vamos (ChV) – National Renewal (RN) – Independent Democratic Union (UDI) – Political Evolution (Evopoli)	Conservatism; Liberal conservatism	Centre-right to right-wing	19.53%	37 / 155		
	Everything for Chile; Todo por Chile	List: Christian Democratic Party (PDC); Party for Democracy (PPD); Radical Party (PR)	Social liberalism Progressivism	Centre to centre-left	7.41%	6 / 155		
Logo	Republican Party; Partido Republicano	List: Republican Party (PLR)	National conservatism Right-wing populism	Right-wing to far-right	1.04%	0 / 155		
	Party of the People; Pacto con la Gente	List: Party of the People (PDG)	Populism; E-democracy	Centre to right-wing	New	0 / 155		
	Lists of independent candidates				11.21%	8 / 155		
	Independent candidates outside lists				11.21%	8 / 155		

== Opinion polls ==
Polling firm	Fieldwork date	Sample size	UxCh			TxCh		Dem	AxCh	PDG	ChS	PLR	Ind.	Undecided	Lead
Polling firm	Fieldwork date	Sample size	AD		SD		DC	Dem	AxCh	PDG	ChS	PLR	Ind.	Undecided	Lead
Polling firm	Fieldwork date	Sample size	PCCh	FA	PS	PPD	DC	Dem	AxCh	PDG	ChS	PLR	Ind.	Undecided	Lead
Activa	11–14 Apr 2023	1,020	13.8			4.8		–	–	6.9	8.1	7.7	-	58.7	5.7
Tú Influye	30 Mar – 2 Apr 2023	1,121	25			6		–	–	4	12	14	-	39	11
Tú Influyes	2–6 Mar 2023	1,000	24			7		–	–	4	13	10	–	42	11
Activa	20–24 Feb 2023	816	10			5.9		–	–	5	10.1	7.5	–	61.5	0.1
Panel Ciudadano	8–9 Feb 2023	4,862	15			6		–	–	5	15	9	–	50	Tie
Activa	23–27 Jan 2023	870	14.1		7.4			–	–	9.4	8.3	8.2	–	52.6	4.7
Activa	23–27 Jan 2023	870	20.3					–	–	11.8	10.4	7.5	–	50.0	8.5
Activa	23–27 Jan 2023	870	22.8					–	–	12.6	15.0		–	49.6	7.8
Cadem	14–16 Dec 2022	707	8	7	4		3	4	4	8	12	10	5	35	2
Cadem	16–18 Nov 2022	702	5	8	3		5	–	4	14	13	10	8	30	1
Cadem	2–4 Nov 2022	708	7	7	6		3	–	8	15	14	9	9	22	1

== Results ==
The list of the 51 members who were elected was posted shortly after the election.

Party or alliance		Votes	%	Seats
Republican Party		3,470,855	34.34	23
Unity for Chile	Communist Party of Chile	791,856	7.83	2
Unity for Chile	Socialist Party of Chile	584,142	5.78	6
Unity for Chile	Social Convergence	560,799	5.55	4
Unity for Chile	Democratic Revolution	424,346	4.20	4
Unity for Chile	Comunes	220,515	2.18	0
Unity for Chile	Liberal Party	114,747	1.14	0
Unity for Chile	Social Green Regionalist Federation	99,527	0.98	0
Unity for Chile	Humanist Action	6,851	0.07	0
Unity for Chile	Total	2,802,783	27.73	16
Safe Chile	Independent Democrat Union	868,167	8.59	6
Safe Chile	National Renewal	724,384	7.17	4
Safe Chile	Evópoli	471,903	4.67	1
Safe Chile	Total	2,064,454	20.42	11
Everything for Chile	Christian Democratic Party	370,579	3.67	0
Everything for Chile	Party for Democracy	352,288	3.49	0
Everything for Chile	Radical Party of Chile	154,697	1.53	0
Everything for Chile	Total	877,564	8.68	0
Party of the People		537,194	5.31	0
Independents		48,524	0.48	0
Indigenous list		306,681	3.03	1
Total		10,108,055	100.00	51
Valid votes		10,108,055	78.57	
Invalid votes		2,169,625	16.87	
Blank votes		586,667	4.56	
Total votes		12,864,347	100.00	
Registered voters/turnout		15,150,571	84.91	
Source: SERVEL (99.99% counted)

=== Indigenous member ===
Candidate	Votes	%
Alihuen Antileo Navarrete	160,805	52.43
Julio Marileo Calfuqueo	145,876	47.57
Total	306,681	100.00
Valid votes	306,681	81.91
Invalid votes	49,639	13.26
Blank votes	18,099	4.83
Total votes	374,419	100.00
Registered voters/turnout	374,753	99.91
Source: SERVEL (99.90% counted)

== Aftermath ==
=== Analysis ===
Chilean right-wing parties, which were opposed to major changes to the constitution, won a 3/5 majority of constitutional council members to freely draft a new constitution and removing the veto option for the left-wing camp. This marked a sharp shift from a left-wing majority that freely drafted a rejected first constitutional rewrite in 2021, and reflected disillusionment with the government of President Gabriel Boric, whose approval rating stood at under 35%.

The far-right Republican Party became the leading political force with 34% of the vote and 23 members, giving the party a veto right on amendments. President Boric’s left-wing coalition garnered about 28% and 16 seats, while a separate coalition of traditional right-wing parties gained more than 21% of the vote and 11 seats. Centrist parties took the remainder of the vote while failing to gain seats.

According to the BBC, "analysts say the new body will now face an uphill struggle to reconcile the ideas of its conservative majority with the clamour for change which triggered the process in the first place."

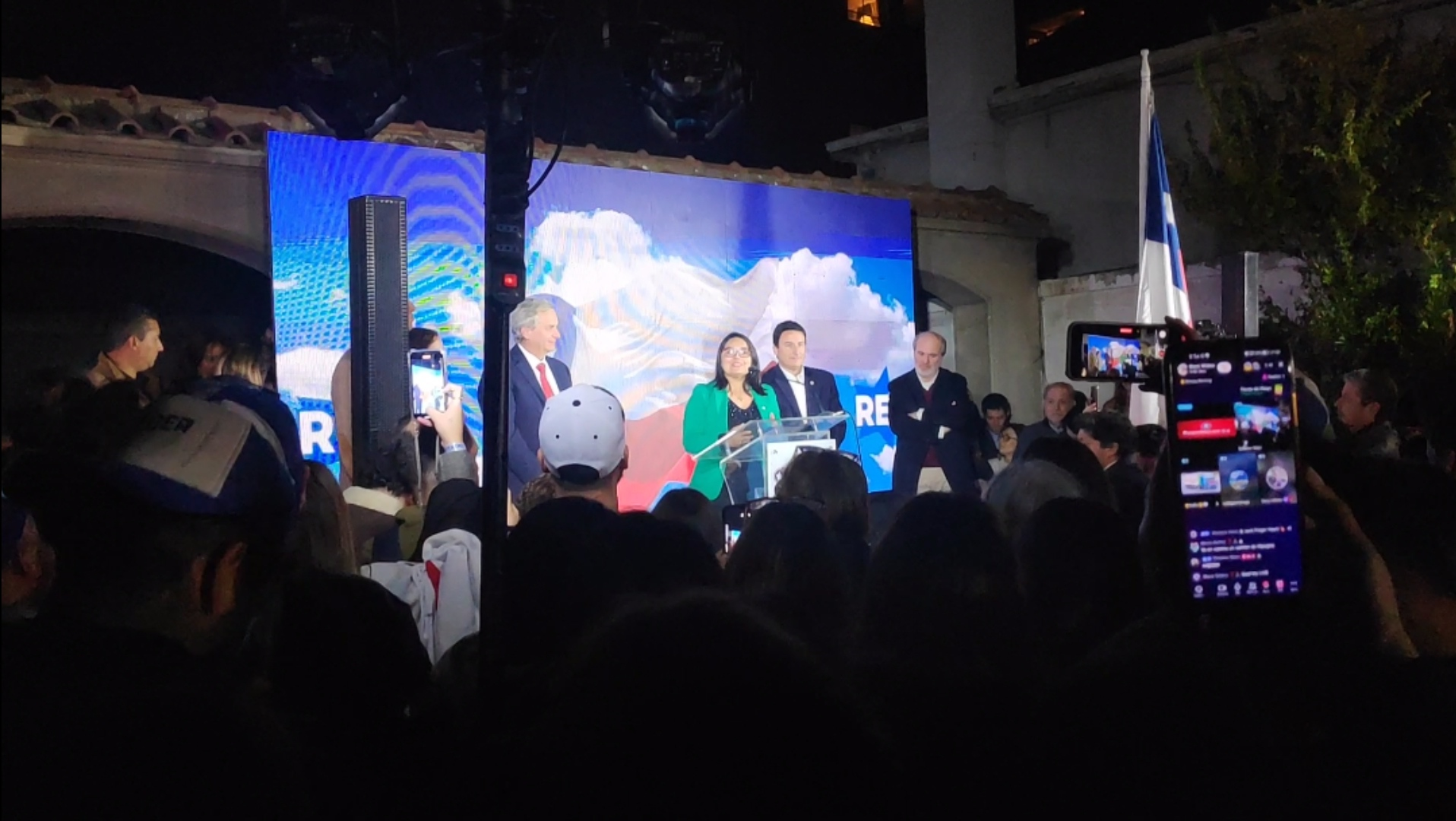
Command of the Republican Party after the party's victory in May 2023

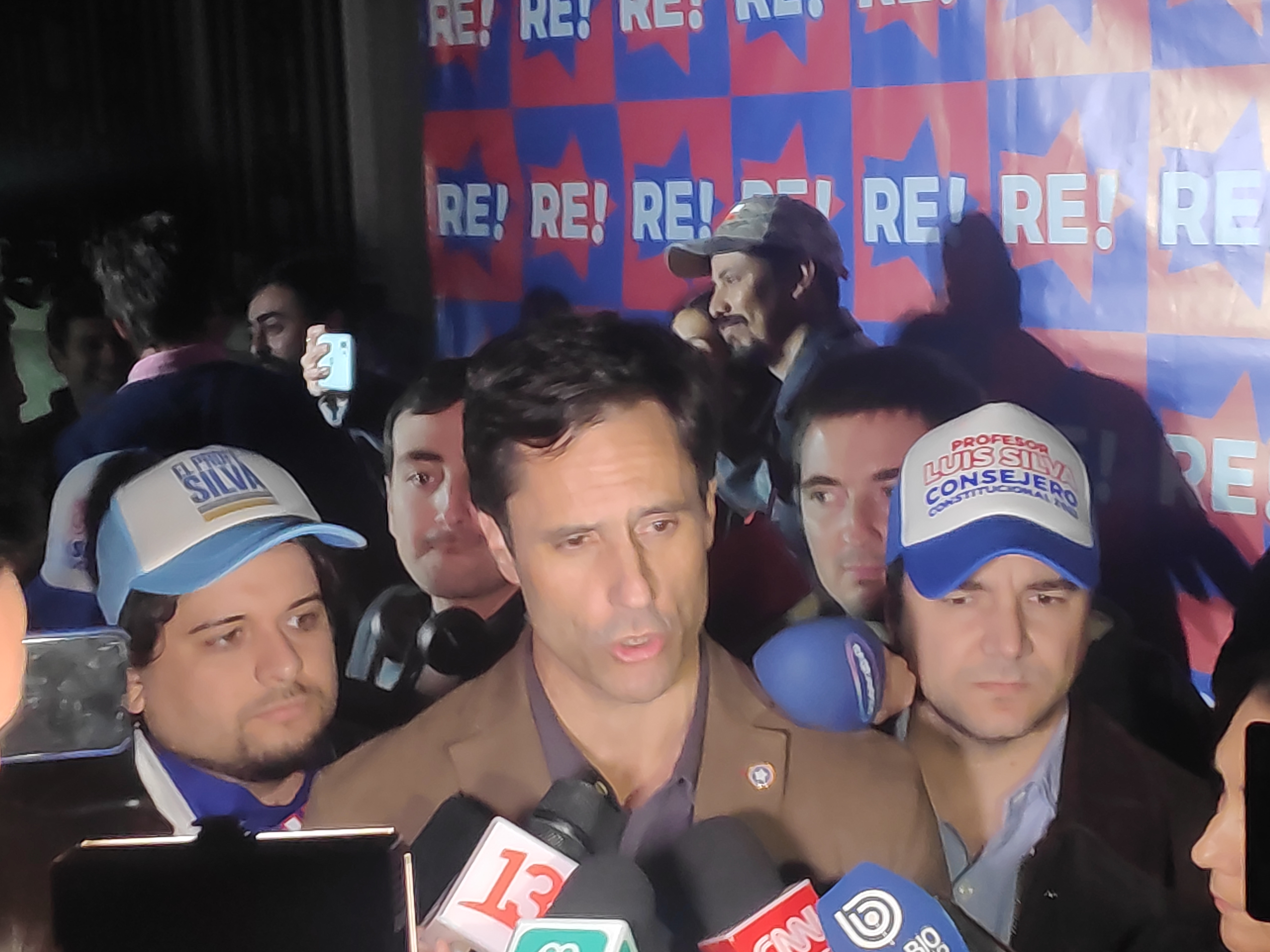
Luis Silva, the candidate who obtained the most votes

A number of "historic" Party for Democracy militants expressed their belief that running on separate lists from the left was a mistake since the centrist Todo por Chile did not gain a single councillor despite obtaining 9% of the vote. El Mostrador blamed Party for Democracy's party leader Natalia Piergentili for this decision. Piergentili would later be replaced as party leader by Jaime Quintana in September.

Defeat in the election was described by Ex-Ante to have "pensioned off" a number of candidates who were formerly elected officials through much of the 1990s, 2000s and 2010s. Among these were the defunct Concertación's Andrés Zaldívar, Sergio Bitar, Carmen Frei, Marcelo Schilling and Jaime Ravinet.

=== Reactions ===
The Republican Party said that they would immediately reject any proposal to make abortion a constitutional right, with the party spokesman Luis Silva Irarrázaval saying "women’s reproductive rights are not essential to a constitution". Silva, the Republican Party’s most-voted candidate, told Al Jazeera’s Lucia Newman that they never wanted to replace the dictatorship-era constitution of Augusto Pinochet, stating "It’s our starting point. This process allows us to introduce new aspects to it that we believe our constitution deserves." Republican Party leader José Antonio Kast, who lost to president Boric in the 2021 general election, held a victory speech in Santiago; "Today is the first day of a better future, a new start for Chile. Chile has defeated a failed government." President Boric conceded, adding that the government would act as a guarantor and support requests from the new council; “the government won’t meddle with the process and will respect the entity’s autonomy in its deliberation.” President Boric was criticized by some left-wing politicians for adopting a moderate position and abandoning previous political promises.

The house of the farmer Héctor Urban in Ercilla, Araucanía Region, was attacked with gunfire following his election as Constitutional Council member. On the same night of the attack, the car of Urban's father and a police station in Ercilla were also attacked with gunfire. The identity of the assailants is unknown.
