= 2023 Chilean constitutional referendum =

- 17 December 2023
- Are you in favor or against the text of the new constitution?
- Outcome: New constitution not adopted
- Website: Official results

Results
Choice	Votes	%
In favor	5,470,025	44.24%
Against	6,894,287	55.76%
Valid votes	12,364,312	95.00%
Invalid or blank votes	650,639	5.00%
Total votes	13,014,951	100.00%
Registered voters/turnout	15,406,352	84.48%
- Results by commune

A constitutional referendum was held in Chile on 17 December 2023, to determine whether the public approved a new constitution drafted by an appointed committee of experts and amended by an elected Constitutional Council. The new text of the constitution was approved by the Council on 30 October and put to a vote on 17 December.

The proposed constitution was rejected by a 12-point margin, with 56% of the electorate voting against the constitution and 44% in favour.

== Background ==
On 4 September 2022, a national plebiscite, best known as the "exit plebiscite", was held to determine whether voters agreed with the new Political Constitution of the Republic drafted by the Constitutional Convention earlier that year. The proposed constitution, which had faced "intense criticism that it was too long, too left-wing and too radical", was rejected by a margin of 62% to 38%. It was considered one of the world’s most progressive constitutions, but many voters found it too polarising, and controversies mired the process. Therefore, the current 1980 Constitution continued to be in effect.

=== Agreement for Chile ===
Lawmakers announced the "Agreement for Chile" in December 2022, as a second attempt to draft a new constitution with different rules. The agreement states that a group of 50 directly-elected constitutional advisors will draft the constitution based on a preliminary draft prepared by a commission of 24 experts appointed by Congress. Additionally, a 14-member body appointed by Congress will ensure that the proposed text aligns with the 12 institutional and fundamental principles outlined in the agreement.

The agreement was reached on 12 December 2022, and ratified by the right-wing Congress a month later, with the Republican Party and the Party of the People not participating in the agreement while agreeing to participate in the elections. This new system would involve two councils; a Congress-elected Council of Experts and a popular election of a Constitutional Council. In this first phase on 25 January 2023, Congress chose members on the Council of Experts. Independent Democratic Union politician Hernán Larraín, who previously supported the Pinochet dictatorship, was chosen to head the Council of Experts to draft the new constitution.

Council members would be directly elected in May, with equal representation of men and women and the participation of indigenous peoples. A three-fifths majority vote in the Council is required to approve articles, which is lower than the two-thirds majority required in the previous convention. Unlike the previous convention, the number of seats reserved for indigenous representatives was not fixed; rather, it will depend on the number of votes they receive. The commission's work period on the first draft was set from 6 March to 6 June, and the Constitutional Council would commence its work thirty days after its election on 6 June 2023. The council was given a deadline to deliver the draft constitution by 6 November, and a mandatory referendum was set to be held on 17 December 2023.

== Drafting of the constitution ==
The new constitution was to be drafted by 24 experts and 50 constitutional advisors elected by direct vote.

=== Expert Commission ===
The Expert Commission (Spanish: Comisión Experta) in Chile is a 24 member body created to assist in the drafting of a new constitution by the second constituent assembly. Its primary objective is to draft a constitution for the Constitutional Council before it begins its work, and the commission's text will be used as a starting point.

On March 6, 2023, the Commission of Experts was inaugurated at the Palace of the former National Congress of Chile. The inaugural session was chaired by Hernán Larraín, the 75-year-old dean of the commissioners. After the session, the Commission elected its president and vice-president, with the president elected by a majority vote and the vice-president by the second highest number of votes. In the event of a tie, a procedure would have been established to distinguish between the two highest majorities. The primary objective of the commission is to create a preliminary draft of a new Constitution for discussion by the 50 members of the Constitutional Council, beginning on June 7. Following the Assembly's establishment in June, the commissioners will join and be able to attend sessions and commissions, and have the right to speak, but not vote.

=== Constitutional Council ===
The general 51 seats in the Constitutional Council were elected in the same manner as members of the Senate of Chile, which is multi-member proportional representation (D'Hondt method) with open lists in constituencies of between two and five seats corresponding to the regions. As in the previous constituent body, there will be additional seats reserved for indigenous peoples, but this time they will be based on their percentage of votes, and not according to a number set in advance by ethnic group. There is also gender parity required, in which the lists presented by the parties alternate male and female candidates, with measures in place to adjust should the election result in an imbalance (the final chamber must contain 25 men and 25 women).

Chilean right-wing parties, which were opposed to major changes to the constitution, won a 3/5 majority of constitutional council members to freely draft a new constitution and removing the veto option for the left-wing camp. This marked a sharp shift from a left-wing majority that freely drafted a rejected first constitutional rewrite in 2021, and reflected disillusionment with the government of President Gabriel Boric, whose approval rating stood at under 35%. The Republican Party, which has been described as far-right, became the leading political force with 34% of the vote and 23 members, giving the party a veto right on amendments. President Boric’s left-wing coalition garnered about 28% and 16 seats, while a separate coalition of traditional right-wing parties gained more than 21% of the vote and 11 seats. Another seat was won by the Indigenous list. Centrist parties took the remainder of the vote while failing to gain seats.

=== Contents ===
The proposed document was described as "conservative" and "market-friendly", with "strict rules around immigration and abortion", a fact largely credited to the efforts of the Republican Party.

== Party positions ==
Choice	Parties	Political orientation	Leader	Ref
In favor	Chile Vamos (ChV)	Liberal conservatism	—	
In favor	Independent Democratic Union (UDI)	Conservatism	Javier Macaya	
In favor	National Renewal (RN)	Conservatism	Rodrigo Galilea	
In favor	Political Evolution (Evópoli)	Classical liberalism	Gloria Hutt	
In favor	Republican Party (PLR)	National conservatism	Arturo Squella	
In favor	Amarillos por Chile (AxCh)	Concertacionism	Andrés Jouannet	
In favor	Democrats (D)	Christian humanism	Ximena Rincón	
In favor	Party of the People (PDG)	Populism	Franco Parisi	
In favor	Common Sense (SC)	Regionalism	Rodrigo Caramori Donoso	
Against	Democratic Socialism (SD)	Social democracy	—	
Against	Socialist Party of Chile (PS)	Social democracy	Paulina Vodanovic	
Against	Party for Democracy (PPD)	Progressivism	Jaime Quintana	
Against	Radical Party of Chile (PR)	Social liberalism	Leonardo Cubillos	
Against	Liberal Party of Chile (PL)	Social liberalism	Juan Carlos Urzúa	
Against	Broad Front (FA)	Progressivism	Gabriel Boric	
Against	Social Convergence (CS)	Libertarian socialism	Diego Ibáñez	
Against	Democratic Revolution (RD)	Democratic socialism	Diego Vela	
Against	Commons	Autonomism	Marco Velarde	
Against	Chile Digno (ChD)	Democratic socialism	—	
Against	Communist Party of Chile (PCCh)	Communism	Lautaro Carmona	
Against	Social Green Regionalist Federation (FREVS)	Regionalism	Flavia Torrealba Diaz	
Against	Humanist Action (AH)	Humanism	Tomás Hirsch	
Against	Christian Democratic Party (PDC)	Christian democracy	Alberto Undurraga	
Against	Humanist Party of Chile (PH)	Universal humanism	Claudio Ojeda Murillo	
Against	Equality Party (PI)	Left-wing populism	Iván Carrasco	
Against	Progressive Homeland (PP)	Progressivism	Marco Enríquez-Ominami	
Against	People's Party (Popular)	Left-wing nationalism	Cristián Cuevas	
Against	Popular Green Alliance Party (PAVP)	Animal welfare	Carlos Pichuante Verdugo	
Both	Christian Social Party (PSC)	Religious conservatism	Sara Concha	

== Opinion polls ==
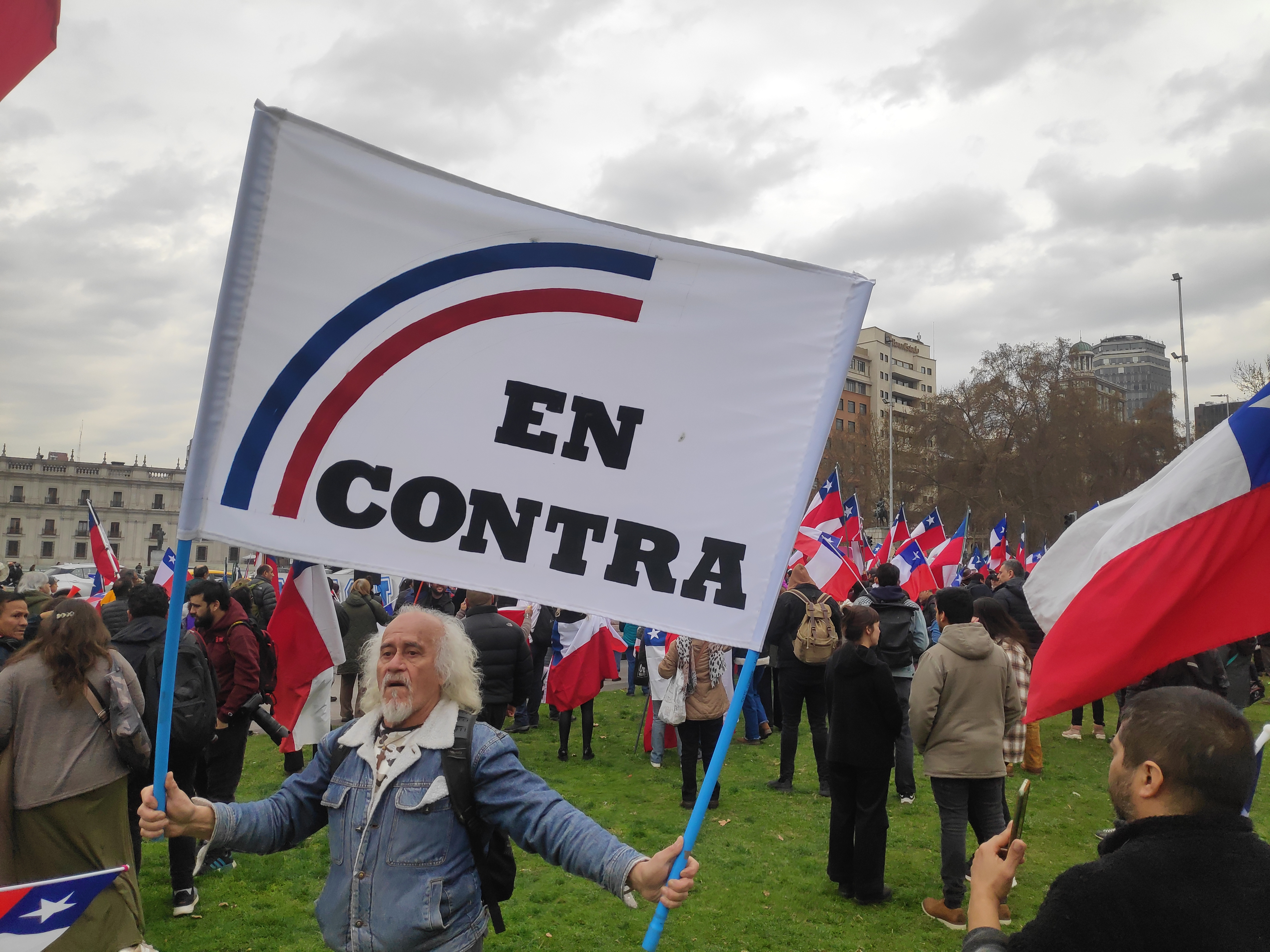
Person showing his support for the "Against" option.

The table below lists weighted voting intentions from opinion polls in reverse chronological order, showing the most recent first and using the dates when the survey fieldwork was done, as opposed to the date of publication.

Pollster	Fieldwork date	Sample size	In favor	Against	Don't know	Lead
Cadem	8–10 November 2023	710	32%	50%	18%	−18
Criteria	2–6 November 2023	1,000	32%	68%		−36
Cadem	13–15 September 2023	703	29%	71%		−42

== Results ==
Chileans voted against the new constitution, with a turnout of just under 85%. This marked the second draft constitution to be rejected following a referendum, after the prior draft was defeated in 2022. This indicates a failure for both the left-wing and right-wing camps, who drafted the first and second proposals, respectively.

2023 Chilean constitutional referendum
Choice	Votes	%
For	5,470,025	44.24
Against	6,894,287	55.76
Total	12,364,312	100.00
Valid votes	12,364,312	95.00
Invalid votes	480,730	3.69
Blank votes	169,921	1.31
Total votes	13,014,963	100.00
Registered voters/turnout	15,406,352	84.48
Source: Servicio Electoral de Chile

Support for the "against" option was strongest in the central and northern parts of the country, while the "in favor" performed relatively better in the southern half of Chile, except in Magallanes Region.

At a communal level the option "in favor" would have won if counting only communes with less than 10,000 inhabitants, while the "against" option had in general an increasing share of the vote in more populated communes, reaching 58% of the vote if counting only communes with more than 100,000 inhabitants.

The "against" vote was particularly strong among women under 34 years of age among which 70.1% voted against.

The voting pattern was similar to that of the second round of the 2021 Chilean general election with areas that voted mostly for Boric showing a stronger vote for the "against" option and areas that voted mostly for José Antonio Kast displaying relatively more votes for the "in favor" option.

== Aftermath ==
President Boric stated that he would not seek a third referendum or constitutional convention.

Various politicians of the centre-right and right-wing parties Evópoli, National Renewal and Independent Democratic Union signed a letter in late December 2023 blaming "maximalism" on behalf of the hard-right Republican Party for the defeat of the new proposed constitutional text. Pundit Pablo Ortúzar interpreted the result as a left-wing "vengeance" for the 2022 Chilean constitutional referendum aided by a "dirty campaign".

Within Social Convergence, President Boric's party, there were calls to move into a political "offensive" following the success of the "against" option they had supported.

Pundit Daniel Mansuy interpreted the result a defeat for the Chilean "political class" in general and more in particular for the Republican Party.
