= 2022 Chilean constitutional referendum =

- 4 September 2022
- Do you approve the text of the New Constitution proposed by the Constitutional Convention?

Results
Choice	Votes	%
Approve	4,860,266	38.13%
Reject	7,886,434	61.87%
Valid votes	12,746,700	97.86%
Invalid or blank votes	278,092	2.14%
Total votes	13,024,792	100.00%
Registered voters/turnout	15,173,929	85.84%
- Results by commune

A constitutional referendum was held in Chile on 4 September 2022, in order to determine whether the public agreed with the text of a new Political Constitution of the Republic drawn up by the Constitutional Convention. It was commonly referred to as the "exit plebiscite" (plebiscito de salida).

The proposed constitution, which had faced "intense criticism that it was too long, too left-wing and too radical", was rejected by a margin of 62% to 38%.

== Date ==
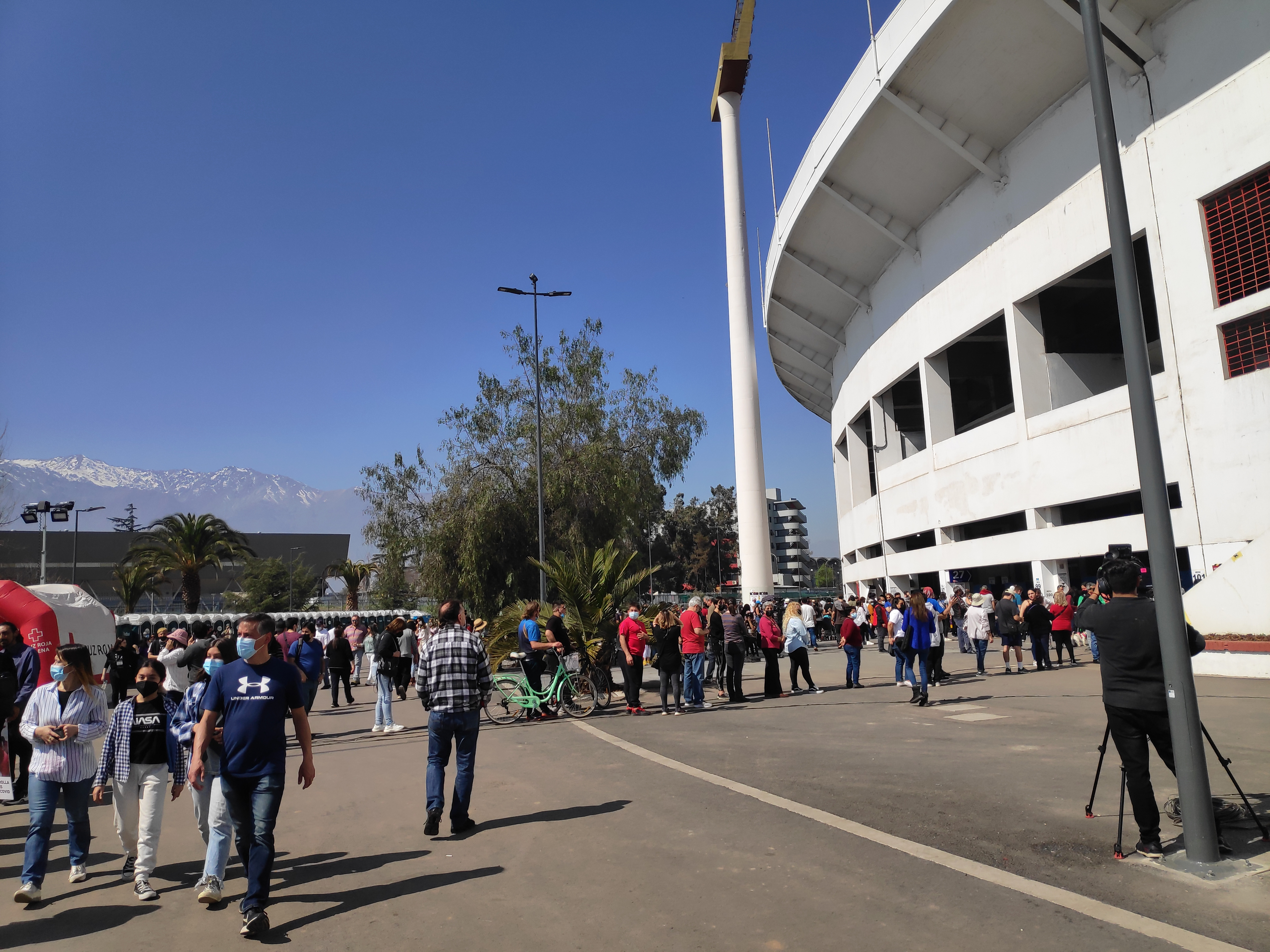
The election at the National Stadium in Santiago.

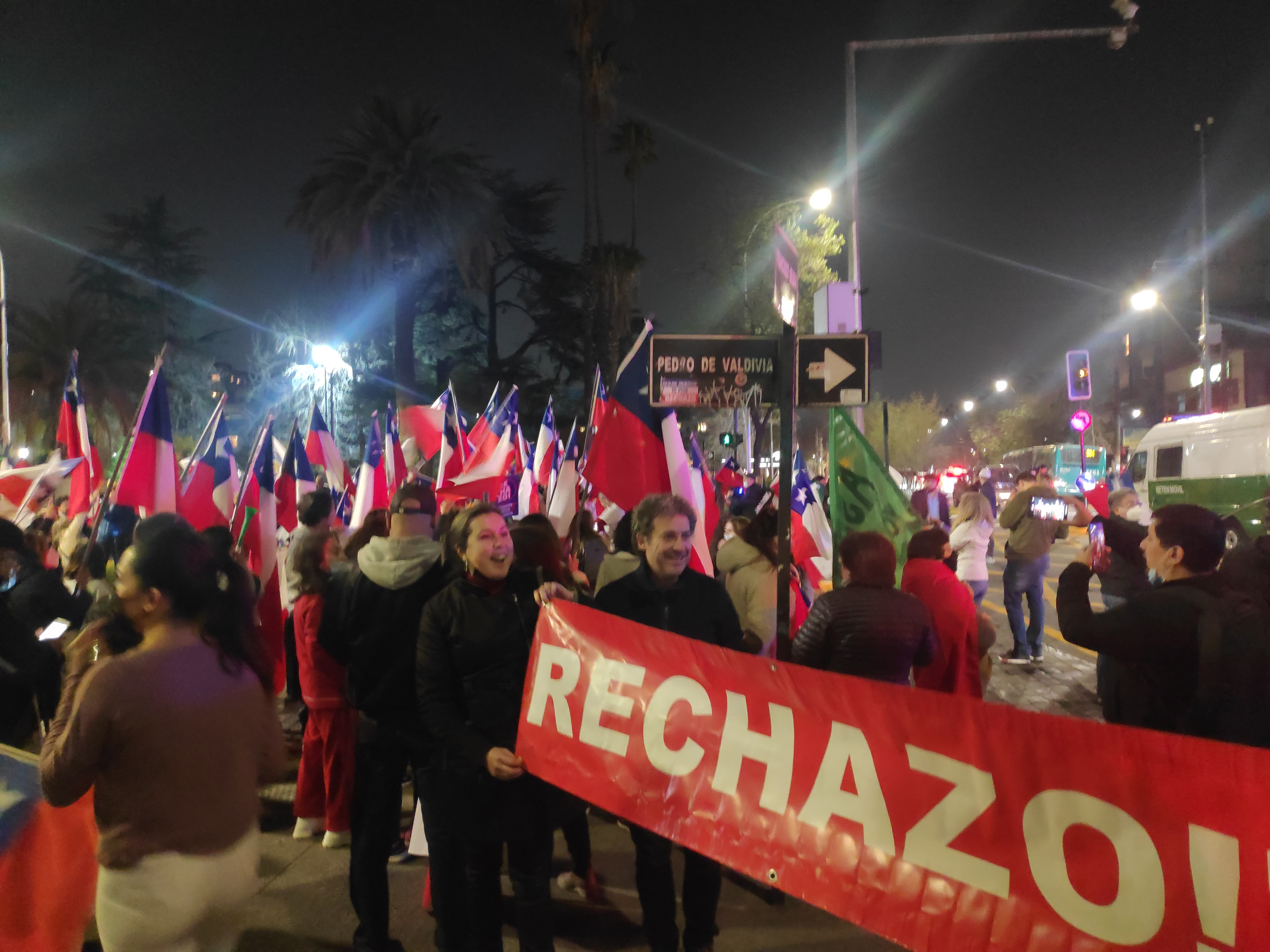
'Rechazo' campaign, 1 September 2022.

According to the itinerary originally proposed for the constituent process, it was estimated that the plebiscite to approve or reject the text of the new Constitution would take place in September 2021, if the Constitutional Convention met its term of nine months and did not request the three-month extension, or in March 2022, if it requested such an extension. In addition, the exit plebiscite could not be held 60 days before or after another election, nor could it be held in January or February, which would have placed it on the first Sunday in March if an extension were requested.

As a result of the postponement of the first plebiscite to 25 October 2020 due to the COVID-19 pandemic, the date of the exit plebiscite was also modified. It was projected to take place during the third quarter of 2022, in September at the latest. In April 2022, it was announced that the referendum would be held on 4 September.

== Format ==
Article 142 of the 1980 Political Constitution of the Republic of Chile indicates the text of the ballot in the plebiscite:

In the aforementioned plebiscite, the citizens will have an electoral card that will contain the following question ... : "Do you approve the text of the New Constitution proposed by the Constitutional Convention?". Under the question posed there will be two horizontal stripes, one next to the other. The first one will have the expression "Approve" at the bottom and the second one, the word "Reject", so that the voter can mark his preference over one of the alternatives.

— Political Constitution of the Republic of Chile of 1980, article 142

There was no contingency plan in place as to what will happen if the new constitution is rejected. Chilean human rights lawyer Dinka Benítez stated that "given that 80 percent of those who voted in the plebiscite want a new constitution, it seems that Chile ... will necessarily have to find a way to have a new constitution" in some form, and that a "reject" vote would not necessarily be a death knell for constitutional reform.

== Party positions ==
Choice	Parties	Political orientation	Leader	Ref
Approve	Apruebo Dignidad (AD)	Progressivism	Gabriel Boric	
Approve	Democratic Revolution (RD)	Democratic socialism	Juan Ignacio Latorre	
Approve	Social Convergence (CS)	Libertarian socialism	Alondra Arellano	
Approve	Commons	Socialism of the 21st century	Marco Velarde	
Approve	Communist Party of Chile (PCCh)	Communism	Guillermo Teillier	
Approve	Social Green Regionalist Federation (FREVS)	Regionalism	Flavia Torrealba Diaz	
Approve	Humanist Action (AH)	Humanism	Tomás Hirsch	
Approve	Unir Movement (UNIR)	Progressivism	Marcelo Díaz	
Approve	Democratic Socialism (SD)	Social democracy		
Approve	Socialist Party of Chile (PS)	Social democracy	Paulina Vodanovic	
Approve	Party for Democracy (PPD)	Progressivism	Natalia Piergentili	
Approve	Radical Party of Chile (PR)	Social liberalism	Leonardo Cubillos	
Approve	Liberal Party of Chile (PL)	Social liberalism	Vlado Mirosevic	
Approve	Christian Democratic Party (PDC)	Christian democracy	Felipe Delpin	
Approve	Humanist Party (PH)	Universal humanism	Natalia Ibáñez	
Approve	Green Ecologist Party (PEV)	Green politics	Félix González Gatica	
Reject	Chile Vamos (ChV)	Liberal conservatism		
Reject	Independent Democratic Union (UDI)	Conservatism	Javier Macaya	
Reject	National Renewal (RN)	Conservatism	Francisco Chahuán	
Reject	Political Evolution (Evópoli)	Classical liberalism	Luz Poblete Coddou	
Reject	Republican Party (PLR)	National conservatism	Rojo Edwards	
Reject	Party of the People (PDG)	Populism	Franco Parisi	

== Opinion polls ==
The tables below list opinion polling results in reverse chronological order, showing the most recent first and using the dates when the survey fieldwork was done, as opposed to the date of publication. Where the fieldwork dates are unknown, the date of publication is given instead. The highest percentage figure in each polling survey is displayed with its background shaded in the leading option's color. The "Lead" column on the right shows the percentage-point difference between the options in a poll.

=== Voting intention estimates ===
The table below lists weighted voting intention estimates. Refusals are generally excluded from the party vote percentages, while question wording and the treatment of "don't know" responses and those not intending to vote may vary between polling organizations.

Color key:

Poll conducted after legal ban on opinion polls

Polling firm/Commissioner	Fieldwork date	Sample size	Approve	Reject	Lead
2022 Chilean national plebiscite	4 Sep 2022	—	38.1	61.9	–23.8
AtlasIntel	1–3 Sep 2022	3,270	41.9	58.1	–16.2
Cadem	31 Aug–2 Sep 2022	1,415	47.1	52.9	–5.8
UDD	17–19 Aug 2022	8,691	44.3	55.7	–11.4
Cadem	17–19 Aug 2022	1,007	44.6	55.4	–10.8
AtlasIntel	16–19 Aug 2022	2,735	41.6	58.4	–16.8
Activa	16–19 Aug 2022	2,089	41.8	58.2	–16.5
Signos	14–19 Aug 2022	1,095	48.1	51.9	–3.8
Cadem	10–12 Aug 2022	1,015	45.2	54.8	–9.5
Activa	10–12 Aug 2022	1,514	43.3	56.7	–13.4
Signos	7–11 Aug 2022	728	46.5	53.5	–7.0
Data Influye	5–7 Aug 2022	1,650	47.3	52.7	–5.4
Cadem	3–5 Aug 2022	704	44.0	56.0	–12.0
Activa	2–5 Aug 2022	1,224	40.2	59.8	–19.6
Signos	31 Jul–4 Aug 2022	715	45.4	54.6	–9.2
MORI/FIEL	28 Jul–2 Aug 2022	1,500	48.4	51.6	–3.3
Criteria	29 Jul–1 Aug 2022	1,000	44.4	55.6	–11.2
Cadem	27–29 Jul 2022	706	44.2	55.8	–11.6
Signos	24–28 Jul 2022	778	43.9	56.1	–12.2
Criteria	22–26 Jul 2022	1,512	45.0	55.0	–10.0
Cadem	20–22 Jul 2022	701	45.3	54.7	–9.4
Activa	19–22 Jul 2022	1,241	39.6	60.4	–20.8
UDD	20–21 Jul 2022	8,542	43.2	56.8	–13.6
Signos	18–21 Jul 2022	701	42.5	57.5	–15.0
Cadem	13–15 Jul 2022	702	41.6	58.4	–16.8
Signos	11–14 Jul 2022	703	36.9	63.1	–26.2
Cadem	6–8 Jul 2022	708	39.8	60.2	–20.4
Activa	5–8 Jul 2022	1,205	37.3	62.7	–24.6
Signos	4–7 Jul 2022	710	39.3	60.7	–21.6
Feedback	4–6 Jul 2022	2,842	39.5	60.5	–21.0
Data Influye	1–4 Jul 2022	1,555	47.1	52.9	–5.8
Criteria	30 Jun–4 Jul 2022	1,018	39.2	60.8	–21.6
Cadem	29 Jun–1 Jul 2022	707	40.0	60.0	–20.0
UDD	28–29 Jun 2022	1,044	42.2	57.8	–15.6
Signos	26–29 Jun 2022	841	39.1	60.9	–22.2
Cadem	22–24 Jun 2022	702	39.3	60.7	–21.4
Activa	20–24 Jun 2022	1,005	36.0	64.0	–28.0
MORI/FIEL	9–24 Jun 2022	1,000	47.0	53.0	–6.0
Signos	18–22 Jun 2022	803	40.4	59.6	–19.2
Cadem	15–17 Jun 2022	703	44.6	55.4	–10.8
Cadem	8–10 Jun 2022	702	47.6	52.4	–4.8
Activa	6–10 Jun 2022	1,247	41.5	58.5	–17.0
Cadem	2–3 Jun 2022	702	48.3	51.7	–3.4
Criteria	27–31 May 2022	1,059	44.3	55.7	–11.4
CEP	13 Apr–29 May 2022	1,355	48.1	51.9	–3.8
Data Influye	27–29 May 2022	1,451	47.1	52.9	–5.8
Cadem	25–27 May 2022	704	45.1	54.9	–9.8
Activa	23–27 May 2022	1,015	38.7	61.3	–22.6
Cadem	18–20 May 2022	708	44.6	55.4	–10.8
Datavoz	11–17 May 2022	1,337	37.3	62.7	–25.4
Cadem	11–13 May 2022	706	45.2	54.8	–9.6
Activa	10–13 May 2022	1,016	37.3	62.7	–25.4
Black&White	9–11 May 2022	?	38.1	61.9	–23.8
Cadem	4–6 May 2022	705	42.2	57.8	–15.6
Data Influye	29 Apr–2 May 2022	1,651	44.6	55.4	–10.8
Criteria	28 Apr–2 May 2022	1,640	44.3	55.7	–11.4
Cadem	27–29 Apr 2022	703	43.9	56.1	–12.2
Activa	25–29 Apr 2022	1,043	42.2	57.8	–15.6
La Cosa Nostra	9–26 Apr 2022	600	40.8	59.2	–18.4
Studio Publico	23–25 Apr 2022	?	33.7	66.3	–32.6
UDD	24 Apr 2022	?	43.8	56.2	–12.4
Cadem	20–22 Apr 2022	704	44.6	55.4	–10.8
Cadem	12–14 Apr 2022	702	45.8	54.2	–8.4
Criteria/Zoom	12–14 Apr 2022	?	49.2	50.8	–1.6
Activa	11–14 Apr 2022	1,326	46.7	53.3	–6.6
Cadem	6–7 Apr 2022	707	47.0	53.0	–6.0
UDD	5–6 Apr 2022	1,002	47.8	52.2	–4.4
Criteria	31 Mar–4 Apr 2022	813	47.6	52.4	–4.6
Data Influye	1–3 Apr 2022	1,671	50.6	49.4	+1.2
Cadem	30 Mar–1 Apr 2022	707	46.5	53.5	–7.0
Activa	28 Mar–1 Apr 2022	1,521	47.2	52.8	–5.6
Datavoz	15–31 Mar 2022	1,650	46.0	54.0	–8.0
Studio Publico	25–28 Mar 2022	914	39.4	60.6	–21.2
Cadem	23–25 Mar 2022	704	56.1	43.9	+12.2
UDD	22–23 Mar 2022	?	53.1	46.9	+6.5
Activa	18–19 Mar 2022	1,004	54.7	45.3	+9.4
Cadem	16–18 Mar 2022	702	58.2	41.8	+16.4
Feedback	16–18 Mar 2022	1,804	48.2	51.8	–3.6
Cadem	9–11 Mar 2022	708	54.5	45.5	+9.0
UDD	7–8 Mar 2022	1,028	52.6	47.4	+5.2
Data Influye	3–6 Mar 2022	1,466	59.2	40.8	+18.4
Cadem	2–4 Mar 2022	713	54.3	45.7	+8.6
Criteria	25–28 Feb 2022	872	63.2	36.8	+26.4
Studio Publico	22–28 Feb 2022	1,158	41.8	58.2	–16.4
Cadem	23–25 Feb 2022	712	59.5	40.5	+19.0
MORI/FIEL	5–16 Feb 2022	1,000	67.9	32.1	+35.8
Cadem	9–11 Feb 2022	706	55.3	44.7	+10.6
Datavoz	22 Jan–7 Feb 2022	1,413	56.1	43.9	+12.2
Studio Publico	25–31 Jan 2022	1,037	53.1	46.9	+6.2
UDD	30 Jan 2022	?	62.7	37.3	+25.4
Cadem	26–28 Jan 2022	707	62.9	37.1	+25.8
UDD	16 Jan 2022	?	66.7	33.3	+33.4
UDD	28 Nov 2021	?	56.9	43.1	+13.8
UDD	14 Nov 2021	?	57.8	42.2	+15.6

=== Voting preferences ===
The table below lists raw, unweighted voting preferences.

Polling firm/Commissioner	Fieldwork date	Sample size	Approve	Reject	Question	Lead
2022 Chilean national plebiscite	4 Sep 2022	—	37.3	60.6	2.1	–23.3
Cadem	31 Aug–2 Sep 2022	1,415	40	45	15	–5
UDD	17–19 Aug 2022	8,691	39	49	12	–10
Cadem	17–19 Aug 2022	1,007	37	46	17	–9
AtlasIntel	16–19 Aug 2022	2,735	39.0	54.8	6.2	–15.8
Activa	16–19 Aug 2022	2,089	32.9	45.8	21.3	–12.9
Signos	14–19 Aug 2022	1,095	42.6	45.9	11.5	–3.3
Cadem	10–12 Aug 2022	1,015	38	46	16	–8
Activa	10–12 Aug 2022	1,514	33.9	44.4	21.7	–10.5
Signos	7–11 Aug 2022	728	38.2	43.9	17.9	–5.7
Data Influye	5–7 Aug 2022	1,650	43	48	9	–5
Cadem	3–5 Aug 2022	704	37	47	16	–10
Activa	2–5 Aug 2022	1,224	29.9	44.5	25.6	–14.6
Signos	31 Jul–4 Aug 2022	715	38.1	45.8	16.1	–7.7
MORI/FIEL	28 Jul–2 Aug 2022	1,500	44	47	9	–3
Criteria	29 Jul–1 Aug 2022	1,000	36	45	19	–9
Cadem	27–29 Jul 2022	706	38	48	14	–10
Signos	24–28 Jul 2022	778	37.0	47.3	15.7	–10.3
Criteria	22–26 Jul 2022	1,512	36	44	20	–8
Cadem	20–22 Jul 2022	701	39	47	14	–8
Activa	19–22 Jul 2022	1,241	30.1	46.0	23.9	–15.9
UDD	20–21 Jul 2022	8,542	38	50	12	–12
Signos	18–21 Jul 2022	701	35.4	47.8	16.8	–12.4
Cadem	13–15 Jul 2022	702	37	52	11	–15
Signos	11–14 Jul 2022	703	29.6	50.7	19.7	–21.1
Cadem	6–8 Jul 2022	708	35	53	12	–18
Activa	5–8 Jul 2022	1,205	28.0	46.3	25.7	–18.3
Signos	4–7 Jul 2022	710	32.4	50.1	17.5	–17.7
Feedback	4–6 Jul 2022	2,842	34	2	14	–18
Data Influye	1–4 Jul 2022	1,555	41	46	13	–5
Criteria	30 Jun–4 Jul 2022	1,018	31	48	21	–17
Cadem	29 Jun–1 Jul 2022	707	34	51	15	–17
UDD	28–29 Jun 2022	1,044	38	52	10	–14
Signos	26–29 Jun 2022	841	29.9	46.5	23.6	–16.6
Cadem	22–24 Jun 2022	702	33	51	16	–18
Activa	20–24 Jun 2022	1,005	25.0	44.4	30.6	–19.4
MORI/FIEL	9–24 Jun 2022	1,000	31	35	34	–4
Signos	18–22 Jun 2022	803	31.5	46.5	22.0	–15.0
Cadem	15–17 Jun 2022	703	37	46	17	–9
Cadem	8–10 Jun 2022	702	39	43	18	–4
Activa	6–10 Jun 2022	1,247	29.7	41.9	28.4	–12.2
Cadem	2–3 Jun 2022	702	42	45	13	–3
Criteria	27–31 May 2022	1,059	31	39	30	–8
CEP	13 Apr–29 May 2022	1,355	25	27	48	–2
Data Influye	27–29 May 2022	1,451	40	45	15	–5
Cadem	25–27 May 2022	704	37	45	18	–8
Activa	23–27 May 2022	1,015	28.5	45.2	26.3	–16.7
Cadem	18–20 May 2022	708	37	46	17	–9
Datavoz	11–17 May 2022	1,337	28	47	25	–19
Cadem	11–13 May 2022	706	38	46	16	–8
Activa	10–13 May 2022	1,016	27.1	45.5	27.4	–18.4
Black&White	9–11 May 2022	?	32	52	17	–20
Cadem	4–6 May 2022	705	35	48	17	–13
Data Influye	29 Apr–2 May 2022	1,651	37	46	17	–9
Criteria	28 Apr–2 May 2022	1,640	31	39	30	–8
Cadem	27–29 Apr 2022	703	36	46	18	–10
Activa	25–29 Apr 2022	1,043	29.1	40.5	30.4	–11.4
La Cosa Nostra	9–26 Apr 2022	600	40	58	2	–18
Studio Publico	23–25 Apr 2022	?	30.4	59.7	9.9	–29.3
UDD	24 Apr 2022	?	32	41	26	–9
Cadem	20–22 Apr 2022	704	37	46	17	–9
Cadem	12–14 Apr 2022	702	38	45	17	–7
Criteria/Zoom	12–14 Apr 2022	?	31	32	37	–1
Activa	11–14 Apr 2022	1,326	32.2	36.8	31.0	–4.6
Cadem	6–7 Apr 2022	707	39	44	17	–5
UDD	5–6 Apr 2022	1,002	33	36	31	–3
Criteria	31 Mar–4 Apr 2022	813	30	33	37	–3
Data Influye	1–3 Apr 2022	1,671	39	38	23	+1
Cadem	30 Mar–1 Apr 2022	707	40	46	14	–6
Activa	28 Mar–1 Apr 2022	1,521	32.0	35.8	32.2	–3.8
Datavoz	15–31 Mar 2022	1,650	40.9	48.0	11.2	–7.1
Studio Publico	25–28 Mar 2022	914	34.9	53.6	11.6	–18.7
Cadem	23–25 Mar 2022	704	46	36	18	+10
UDD	22–23 Mar 2022	?	43	38	21	+6.5
Activa	18–19 Mar 2022	1,004	37.7	31.2	31.1	+6.5
Cadem	16–18 Mar 2022	702	46	33	21	+13
Feedback	16–18 Mar 2022	1,804	41	44	16	–3
Cadem	9–11 Mar 2022	708	42	35	23	+7
UDD	7–8 Mar 2022	1,028	40	36	24	+4
Data Influye	3–6 Mar 2022	1,466	45	31	24	+14
Cadem	2–4 Mar 2022	713	44	37	19	+7
Criteria	25–28 Feb 2022	872	36	21	43	+15
Studio Publico	22–28 Feb 2022	1,158	34.5	48.1	17.5	–13.6
Cadem	23–25 Feb 2022	712	47	32	21	+15
MORI/FIEL	5–16 Feb 2022	1,000	36	17	47	+19
Cadem	9–11 Feb 2022	706	47	38	15	+9
Datavoz	22 Jan–7 Feb 2022	1,413	46	36	17	+10
Studio Publico	25–31 Jan 2022	1,037	40.5	35.8	23.6	+4.7
UDD	30 Jan 2022	?	42	25	33	+17
Cadem	26–28 Jan 2022	707	56	33	11	+33
UDD	16 Jan 2022	?	42	21	37	+21
UDD	28 Nov 2021	?	37	28	35	+9
UDD	14 Nov 2021	?	37	27	36	+10
2020 Chilean national plebiscite	25 Oct 2020	—	77.9	21.6	0.5	+56.3

== Results ==
Results
Choice	Votes	%
For	4,860,266	38.13
Against	7,886,434	61.87
Total	12,746,700	100.00
Valid votes	12,746,700	97.86
Invalid votes	200,812	1.54
Blank votes	77,280	0.59
Total votes	13,024,792	100.00
Registered voters/turnout	15,173,929	85.84
Source: SERVEL

== Analysis ==
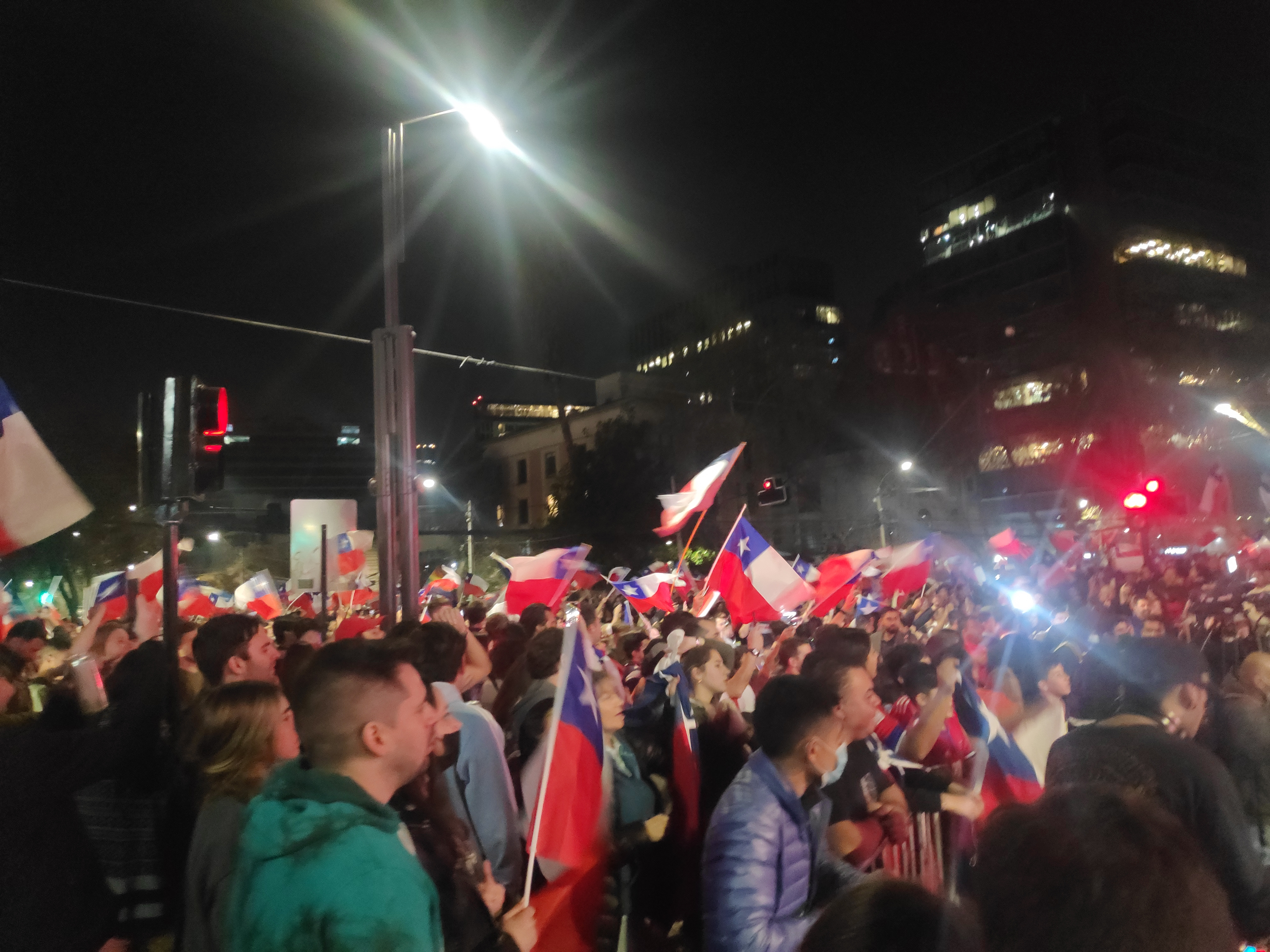
Celebrations for the triumph of the Rejection of a New Constitution in Chile, 4 September 2022.

Chileans' views on the new constitution changed throughout the process of the Constitutional Convention. When the Constitutional Convention started meeting in August 2021, participants in a national poll were asked if they believed that the new constitution resulting from the process would help solve Chile's problems, have no effect, or worsen the current situation, 49% said it would have a positive effect, and 15% said it would have a negative effect. By May 2022, 36% of Chileans said that they believed the new constitution would have a positive effect, a drop from the previous poll. In a study carried out by the independent think tank Espacio Público-IPSOS in July 2022, 38% of respondents believed that the new constitution would bring about several negative changes for the country, while 23% believed it would bring positive changes.

Doubts about the representativeness of the Constitutional Convention's members may have led to its rejection. Respondents to Espacio Público-IPSOS' survey felt the members of the Constitutional Convention were unrepresentative of Chileans as a whole; 59% of respondents said they did not believe the composition of the Constitutional Convention was a good representation of the diversity of Chilean society, and 63% of respondents said they did not feel represented by the Constitutional Convention.

Chileans were also skeptical of particular elements of the new constitution. The indigenous justice system, the plurinational state, and the role of Congress created the most concern. The language of the new constitution declared, "Chile is a Plurinational and Intercultural State that recognizes the coexistence of diverse nations and peoples within the framework of the unity of the State." Regarding an indigenous justice system, the new constitution also declared that "pre-existing indigenous peoples and nations, as well as their members, are entitled to the full exercise of their collective and individual rights by virtue of their self-determination". These new elements generated fears about internal divisions and competing sources of justice to the generally centrist Chilean citizenry. Participants believed that the new constitution would worsen the sale and consumption of drugs, unemployment, poverty and political corruption.

== Aftermath ==
Boric announced a new process for drafting a new constitution, with Al Jazeera writing, "Most Chileans and their politicians have agreed the constitution that dates from the dictatorship must change." Boric called on the heads of all political parties for a meeting on Monday, 5 September 2022, to chart a path forward. As a result of the rejection, the incumbent 1980 Constitution will remain in force, with The Guardian writing that "Chile's future looks decidedly uncertain," and that, "Boric has expressed a willingness to repeat the constitutional process, but the basis for reform is still very much up for debate." Colombian president Gustavo Petro lamented the win of the rejection vote, considering that Chile had decided to "revive Augusto Pinochet".

The Economist considered that "common sense" had led Chileans to reject the proposed constitution and called the result a "blow" for the recently elected government of Gabriel Boric.

In the aftermath of the plebiscite the internal division that the Christian Democratic Party's official support for the "Approve" option had created resurfaced, with various calls for a renewed leadership, and some calling for the expulsion of members who had supported the "Reject" option.

A Constitutional Council election was held on 7 May 2023, with right-wing parties gaining a majority. Its proposed new constitution was subsequently also rejected in another constitutional referendum held on 17 December 2023.

== See also ==
- 2023 Chilean Constitutional Council election
- 2023 Chilean constitutional referendum
