= Everything for Chile =

Everything for Chile Todo por Chile
- Founded: 6 February 2023
- Ideology: Social liberalism Progressivism; Factions: Social democracy Christian democracy
- Political position: Centre to centre-left
- Coalition members: Christian Democratic Party; Party for Democracy; Radical Party
- Constitutional Council: 0 / 51

Website
- pactotodoporchile.cl

Everything for Chile (Spanish: Todo por Chile) was a Chilean electoral alliance formed in February 2023 to present candidacies for the 2023 Chilean Constitutional Council election, which took place on 7 May of the same year.

== History ==
The Christian Democratic Party (PDC) defined on 21 January an electoral alliance with the parties that make up the Democratic Socialism coalition to present candidacies to the Constitutional Council. On the same day, the Radical Party (PR) agreed to run on a list together with the Socialist Party (PS), the Party for Democracy (PPD), and the Liberal Party (PL); On 22 January, the PL made the same decision, without ruling out the possibility of creating a single list of candidates together with the Apruebo Dignidad parties.

The PPD decided on 28 January to present its candidates on a list that groups Democratic Socialism, ruling out a unity list of the parties that make up the Government Alliance. For its part, the PS agreed to define on 31 January its position regarding the electoral alliances it will form with the other government parties. On 2 February, the PL reversed its previous decision and agreed to join the list made up of the PS and Approve Dignity. On February 6, the pacts under the names of Unity for Chile —which brings together the Apruebo Dignidad parties plus the PS and PL— and All for Chile, which brings together the PPD, the PR and the PDC, were officially registered in the Servel. On May 7, the alliance won 8.68% of the popular vote, but won no seats on the Constitutional Council.

== Composition ==
The parties that formed All for Chile were:

Party	President
Christian Democratic Party	Alberto Undurraga
Party for Democracy	Natalia Piergentili
Radical Party of Chile	Leonardo Cubillos
