= Unidad por Chile =

Unity for Chile Unidad por Chile
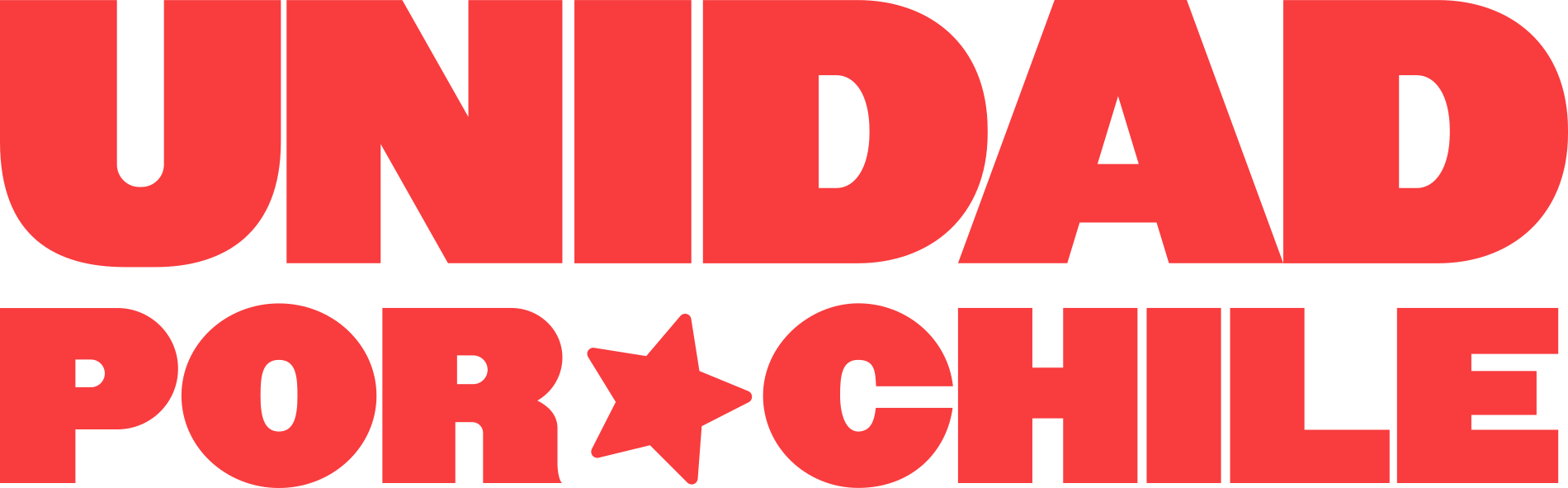
- Abbreviation: UpCh
- Leader: Jeannette Jara
- Spokesperson: Paulina Vodanovic
- Founder: Gabriel Boric
- Founded: 6 November 2022
- Headquarters: Santiago
- Ideology: Progressivism
- Political position: Centre-left to far-left
- Senate: 20 / 50
- Chamber of Deputies: 61 / 155
- Regional Governors: 7 / 16
- Regional councillors: 106 / 302
- Mayors: 82 / 345
- Councillors: 986 / 2,252

Website
- jeannettejara.cl

Unidad por Chile (UpCh, lit. 'Unity for Chile'), known informally as the Government Alliance (Spanish: Alianza de Gobierno) until 2026, is a Chilean coalition of politiсal parties that were part of the government of president Gabriel Boric. The coalition was formed on 6 November 2022 after a meeting called by Boric at the Palace of Cerro Castillo.

The coalition is made up of the member parties of the two coalitions that supported Boric's candidacy and entered his administration: Apruebo Dignidad and Democratic Socialism. The alliance agreed to have a common and rotating spokesperson, the first spokeswoman for the coalition being the president of the Socialist Party, Paulina Vodanovic.

== History ==
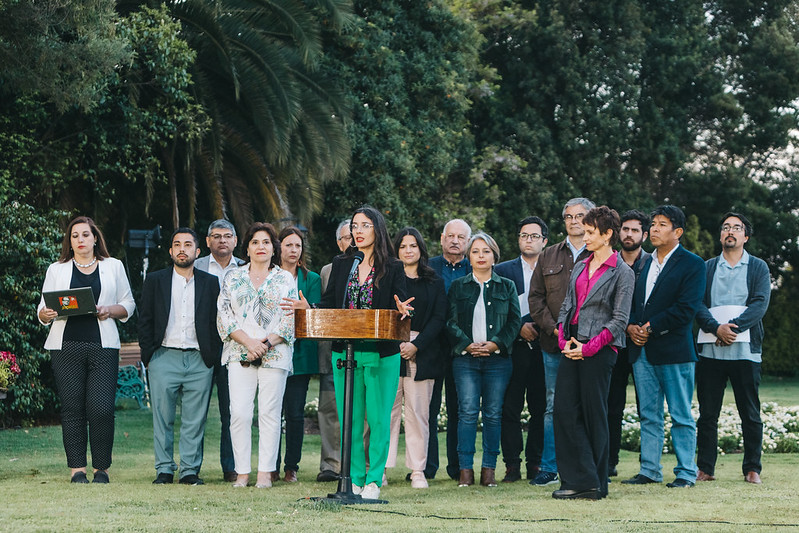
Official leaders in Cerro Castillo on 6 November 2022 announcing the creation of the "Government Alliance".

In March 2021, the primary elections of the Apruebo Dignidad pact, a coalition made up of the Broad Front and Chile Digno, took place. The Broad Front candidate Gabriel Boric won the election, running as the sole candidate of Apruebo Dignidad in the first round of the presidential elections. As the result of this presidential election, he would participate in the runoff election.

After the defeat of the Christian Democrat candidate Yasna Provoste, the New Social Pact coalition formed that year for the elections, bringing together the parties from the Concertación and Nueva Mayoría. These parties had governed the country for 24 years previously. The New Social Pact supported the candidacy of Boric, the Apruebo Dignidad candidate, who won in the runoff.

After Boric's victory in the presidential elections, and given how the congress was composed after the parliamentary elections—Apruebo Dignidad only managed to elect 37 of the 150 deputies and 5 of the 50 senators—Gabriel Boric included in the government the parties that made up the New Social Pact coalition, with the exception of the Christian Democratic Party. These parties would later adopt the nomination of Democratic Socialism.

The government of Gabriel Boric has been supported by these two political blocs (or “two souls”, as the local press has called them): Democratic Socialists and Apruebo Dignidad. The difficult coexistence of both coalitions within the ruling party, added to the defeat of the option supported by the government in the plebiscite on 4 September. This gave rise to the political committee on 17 October 2022, calling an official conclave, with the purpose of analyzing the course that the government should take going forward. The conclave took place on 6 November 2022 in the Presidential Palace of Cerro Castillo, where the leaders of the ruling parties met. Since then, the coalition has met regularly to form an electoral and content committee, and has replicated the first national conclave in various regions of the country.

On 30 April 2025, the coalition was formalized under the name Unidad por Chile, to run in the primaries and presidential elections of that year.

== Composition ==
Coalition	Party	Abbr.	President	Ideology
Democratic; Socialism	Party for Democracy; Partido por la Democracia	PPD	Jaime Quintana	Social democracy Third Way; Progressivism
Democratic; Socialism	Socialist Party of Chile; Partido Socialista de Chile	PS	Paulina Vodanovic	Social democracy Democratic socialism
Democratic; Socialism	Liberal Party of Chile; Partido Liberal de Chile	PL	Juan Carlos Urzúa	Social liberalism Progressivism
Democratic; Socialism	Radical Party of Chile; Partido Radical de Chile	PR	Leonardo Cubillos	Social liberalism Social democracy
	Communist Party of Chile; Partido Comunista de Chile	PCCh	Lautaro Carmona Soto	Communism
	Broad Front; Frente Amplio	FA	Constanza Martínez	Democratic socialism Progressivism; Radical democracy
	Christian Democratic Party; Partido Demócrata Cristiano	PDC	Francisco Huenchumilla	Christian democracy Third Way

=== Former Members ===
Party	Abbr.	Ideology	Political position	President
Social Green Regionalist Federation; Federación Regionalista Verde Social	FREVS	Green politics Regionalism; Decentralization	Centre-left	Flavia Torrealba
Humanist Action; Acción Humanista	AH	New Humanism; Libertarian socialism Radical democracy	Left-wing	Tomás Hirsch

== See also ==
- 2021 Chilean general election
