= Paloma Zúñiga =

Chilean politician

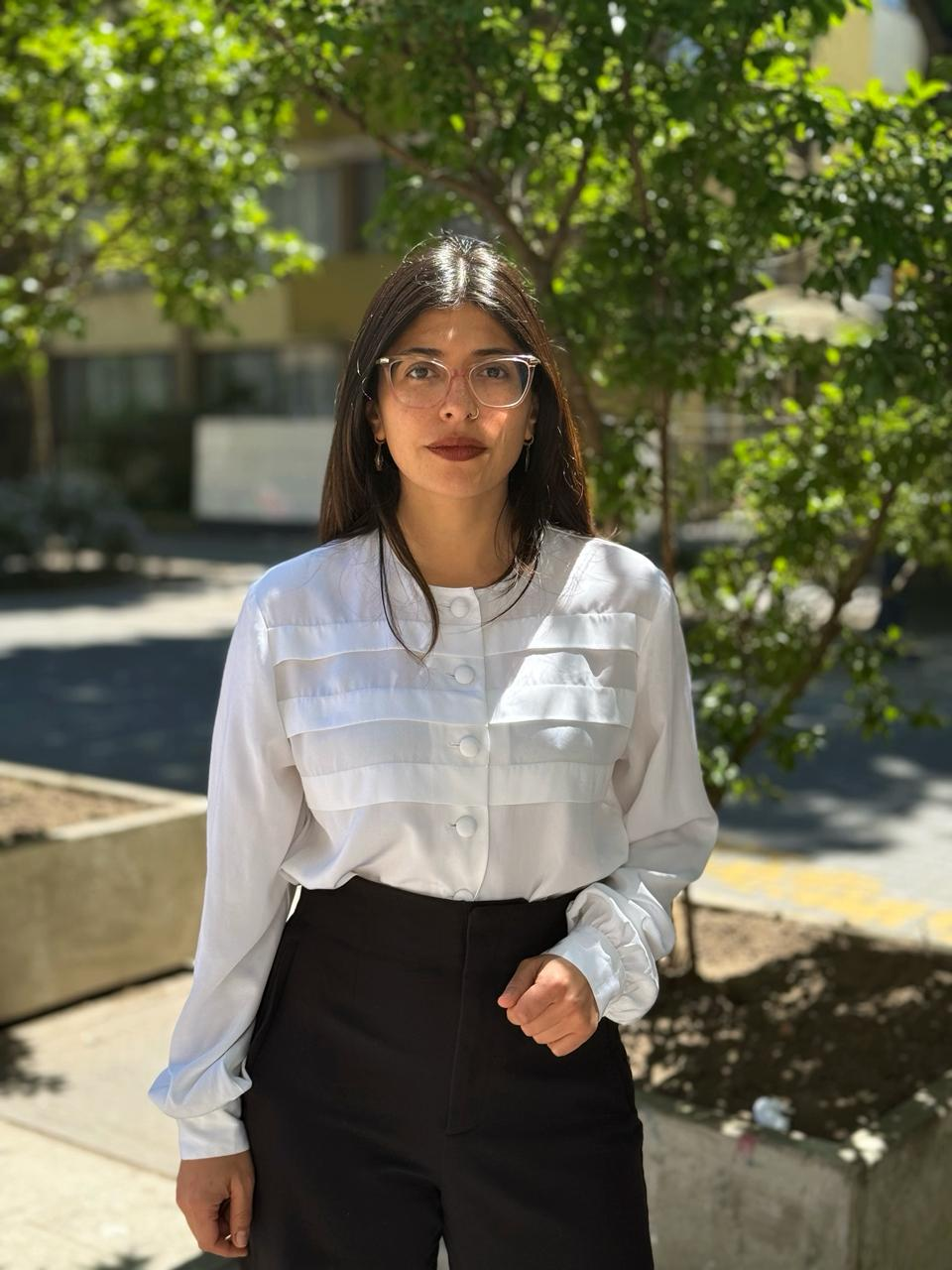

Secretaria Regional Ministerial
- Incumbent
- Assumed office 9 April 2024
- Constituency: Bío Bío Region

Member of the Constitutional Council
- In office 7 June 2023 – 7 November 2023
- Constituency: Bío Bío Region

Personal details
- Born: 23 June 1990 (age 35) Santiago, Chile
- Party: Democratic Revolution (RD)
- Parent(s): Samuel Zúñiga; Gloria Cerda
- Profession: Architect

Paloma Ignacia Zúñiga Cerda (born 23 June 23, 1990) is a Chilean architect and politician. She took office as regional representative of the national ministry for culture, art and heritage for the Bio-Bio Region in April 2024 after being appointed by the president of the republic Gabriel Boric.

In 2023, she served as a member of the Constitutional Council representing the 10th Constituency, Biobío Region. In 2024, she assumed office as Regional Secretary of the Ministry of Cultures, Arts and Heritage for the Biobío Region.

== Biography ==
Zúñiga was born in Santiago on June 23, 1990. She is the daughter of Samuel Zúñiga Mora and Gloria Cerda Contreras.

She completed her primary education at Colegio Seminario Padre Alberto Hurtado in Chillán, graduating in 2003, and her secondary education at Colegio Concepción de Chillán, graduating in 2007. She later studied architecture.

Professionally, she has experience in social housing, housing subsidies, informal settlements, and land management. She has also undertaken entrepreneurial activities in the tourism sector, worked in private architecture firms, and served in the public sector, including positions at the Ministry of National Assets and the Ministry of Housing and Urban Planning.

== Political career ==
In the elections held on May 7, 2023, Zúñiga ran for the Constitutional Council representing the 10th Constituency, Biobío Region, as a member of Revolución Democrática (RD), within the Unity for Chile coalition. She was elected with 88,207 votes.

On April 9, 2024, she assumed office as Regional Secretary of the Ministry of Cultures, Arts and Heritage for the Biobío Region.

In May 2025, in an interview with Diario Concepción, Zúñiga assessed her tenure as regional secretary, stating that her office had strengthened coordination and management cohesion with the regional cultural ecosystem.

Later, in November 2025, in the course of her official duties, she formally requested that the Biobío Regional Government provide accountability for more than CLP 1.2 billion in public funds which, according to the Undersecretariat of Cultures, had not yet been properly justified.
