= Unidad para Chile =

- Founded: 6 February 2023
- Dissolved: 7 November 2023
- Ideology: Democratic socialism
- Political position: Left-wing
- National affiliation: Government Alliance
- Constitutional Council: 16 / 51

Unidad para Chile (English: Unity for Chile) was a left-wing Chilean electoral alliance formed in February 2023 to present candidacies for the Chilean Constitutional Council election that was held on 7 May of the same year.

== History ==
The formation of two lists that group the parties of the Government Alliance, plus the Christian Democratic Party, began in January 2023, during the negotiations to register the pacts and candidacies for the elections of the members of the Constitutional Council. The Christian Democratic Party (PDC) defined on 21 January an electoral alliance with the parties that make up the Democratic Socialism coalition to present candidacies to the Constitutional Council. On the same day, the Radical Party (PR) agreed to run on a list along with the Socialist Party (PS), the Party for Democracy (PPD), and the Liberal Party (PL).; On 22 January, the PL made the same decision, without ruling out the possibility of making a single list of candidates together with the Apruebo Dignidad parties.

The PPD defined on January 28 presenting its candidates in a list that groups Democratic Socialism, ruling out a list of unity of the parties that make up the Government Alliance. For its part, the PS agreed to define on 31 January its position regarding the electoral alliances it will form with the other government parties. On 2 February, the PL reversed its previous decision and agreed to join the list made up of the PS and Apruebo Dignidad. On 6 February, the pacts under the names of Unity for Chile —which brings together the Approve Dignity parties plus the PS and PL— and All por Chile, which brings together the PPD, the PR and the PDC, were officially registered in the Servel.

== Composition ==
The parties that formed Unity for Chile were:

Party	President
Humanist Action	Tomás Hirsch
Commons	Marco Velarde
Social Convergence	Diego Ibáñez
Social Green Regionalist Federation	Flavia Torrealba
Communist Party of Chile	Guillermo Teillier
Liberal Party of Chile	Patricio Morales
Socialist Party of Chile	Paulina Vodanovic
Democratic Revolution	Juan Ignacio Latorre
