= José Toro Kemp =

Chilean lawyer and politician

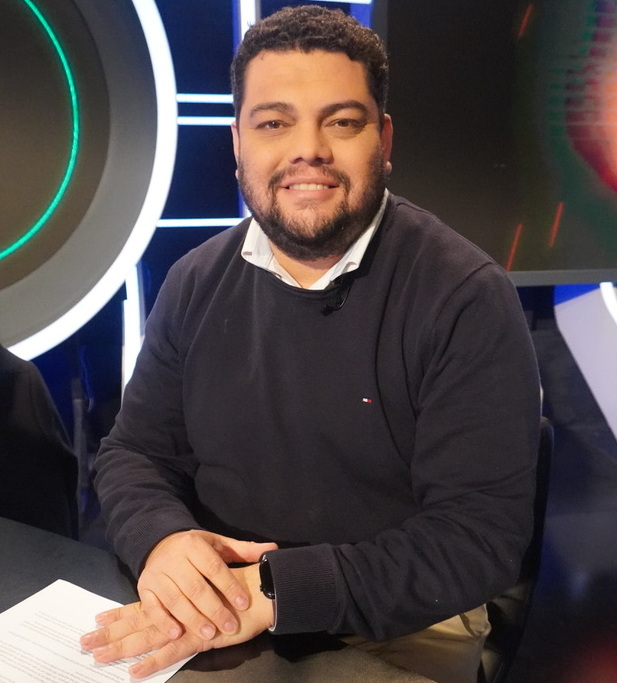

José Toro Kemp is a Chilean lawyer and politician. He served as the Party for Democracy's secretary general.
