= New Deal (Chile) =

Chilean political party

New Deal Nuevo Trato
- Abbreviation: NT
- Leader: Vlado Mirosevic; Pablo Vidal; Valentina Quiroga
- Founded: 30 December 2020; 4 years ago
- Split from: Broad Front
- Ideology: Progressivism; Social democracy Social liberalism
- Political position: Centre-left
- National affiliation: Democratic Socialism; New Social Pact (2021); Constituent Unity (2020 to 2021)
- Members: Liberal Party and independents
- Colours: Green
- Chamber of Deputies: 4 / 155
- Senate: 0 / 43

Website
- elnuevotrato.cl

New Deal (Spanish: Nuevo Trato) is a Chilean centre-left political movement, founded in 2020 by the Liberal Party and former members of Democratic Revolution, all former members of the Broad Front.

== Authorities ==
=== Deputies ===
Name	Region	District	Term
Vlado Mirosevic	Region of Arica y Parinacota	1	2018-2022
Pablo Vidal	Región Metropolitana	8	2018-2022
Natalia Castillo	Región Metropolitana	10	2018-2022
Alejandro Bernales	Region of Los Lagos	26	2018-2022
