= 2001 Chilean parliamentary election =

← 1997	16 December 2001	2005 →
- Chamber of Deputies
- All 120 seats in the Chamber of Deputies
Party	Vote %	Seats	+/–
Concertación	47.90	62	−7
Alliance for Chile	44.27	57	+10
Independents	1.42	1	−1
This lists parties that won seats. See the complete results below.
- Senate
- 18 of 49 seats in the Senate
Party	Vote %	Seats	+/–
Concertación	51.32	20	0
Alliance for Chile	44.03	18	+1
This lists parties that won seats. See the complete results below.

Parliamentary elections were held in Chile on 16 December 2001. The Concert of Parties for Democracy alliance remained the largest faction in the Chamber of Deputies, but saw its majority in the Chamber reduced to just two seats.

== Results ==
=== Senate ===
Party or alliance		Votes	%	Seats		
Party or alliance		Votes	%	Won	Not up	Total
Concertación	Christian Democratic Party	395,728	22.84	2	10	12
Concertación	Socialist Party	254,905	14.71	4	1	5
Concertación	Party for Democracy	219,335	12.66	3	0	3
Concertación	Social Democrat Radical Party	19,025	1.10	0	0	0
Concertación	Total	888,993	51.32	9	11	20
Alliance for Chile	National Renewal	342,045	19.74	4	3	7
Alliance for Chile	Independent Democratic Union	263,035	15.18	3	6	9
Alliance for Chile	Independents	157,639	9.10	2	0	2
Alliance for Chile	Total	762,719	44.03	9	9	18
Communist Party		45,735	2.64	0	0	0
Humanist Party		6,465	0.37	0	0	0
Liberal Party		1,407	0.08	0	0	0
Independents		27,096	1.56	0	0	0
Appointed senators				–	–	9
Former presidents				–	–	2
Total		1,732,415	100.00	18	20	49
Valid votes		1,732,415	87.72			
Invalid/blank votes		242,602	12.28			
Total votes		1,975,017	100.00			
Registered voters/turnout		2,307,154	85.60			
Source: SERVEL, Nohlen, IPU, World Factbook

=== Chamber of Deputies ===
Party or alliance		Votes	%	Seats	+/–
Concertación	Christian Democratic Party	1,162,210	18.92	23	–15
Concertación	Party for Democracy	782,333	12.73	20	+4
Concertación	Socialist Party	614,434	10.00	10	–1
Concertación	Social Democratic Radical Party	248,821	4.05	6	+2
Concertación	Independents	135,191	2.20	3	+3
Concertación	Total	2,942,989	47.90	62	–7
Alliance for Chile	Independent Democratic Union	1,547,209	25.18	31	+14
Alliance for Chile	National Renewal	845,865	13.77	18	–5
Alliance for Chile	Independents	327,121	5.32	8	+2
Alliance for Chile	Total	2,720,195	44.27	57	+10
Communist Party		320,688	5.22	0	0
Humanist Party		69,692	1.13	0	0
Liberal Party		3,475	0.06	0	New
Independents		86,964	1.42	1	–1
Total		6,144,003	100.00	120	0
Valid votes		6,144,003	87.34		
Invalid/blank votes		890,289	12.66		
Total votes		7,034,292	100.00		
Registered voters/turnout		8,075,446	87.11		
Source: SERVEL
