= Liberalism and radicalism in Chile =

This article gives an overview of liberal and radical parties in Chile. It is limited to liberal and radical parties with substantial support, mainly proved by having had a representation in parliament. The sign ⇒ means a reference to another party in that scheme. For inclusion in this scheme, parties do not necessarily need to have labeled themselves as a liberal party.

== Introduction ==
Liberalism was organized as the traditional opposition to conservatism in Chile. In the 1860s radical liberals formed the radical current. Traditional liberalism disappeared in the 1960s into conservatism and radicalism developed into social democracy, leaving liberalism unrepresented. Originally the Social Democrat Radical Party (Partido Radical Social-Democráta, member SI) was a left of center liberal party, but nowadays it is a social democratic party.

== The timeline ==
=== Liberal Party ===
- 1846: The Liberal Party (Partido Liberal) is formed
- 1861: A vehemtly anticlericalist faction formed the ⇒ Radical Party
- 1876: A faction supporting the presidential candidacy of Benjamín Vicuña Mackenna formed the ⇒ Liberal Democratic Party, but returns to the ⇒ Liberal Party after Vicuña ends his candidacy
- 1885: An anti-government faction formed the ⇒ Independent Liberal Party
- 1891: The faction supporting President Balmaceda in the 1891 civil war formed a second ⇒ Liberal Democratic Party.
- 1920: Dissidents seceded as the ⇒ Unionist Liberal
- 1931: Another faction formed the ⇒ United Liberal Party
- 1933: The ⇒ Liberal Democratic Party and the ⇒ Independent Liberal Party merged into the Liberal Party
- 1966: The party merged into the new National Party (Partido Nacional)

=== Radical Party ===
- 1863: A radical faction of the ⇒ Liberal Party formed the Radical Party (Partido Radical)
- 1887: The more leftist Democratic Party seceded from the party
- 1931: The more leftist faction formed the ⇒ Radical Socialist Party
- 1941: The ⇒ Radical Socialist Party rejoined the party
- 1946: A moderate faction formed the ⇒ Radical Democratic Party
- 1948: A faction opposition to the anti-Communist laws ⇒ Radical Doctrinal Party
- 1949: The ⇒ Radical Democrat Party rejoined the party
- 1961: The ⇒ Radical Doctrinal Party rejoined the party
- 1969: In reaction to left-wing tendencies an anti-Communist faction seceded as ⇒ Radical Democracy
- 1971: A moderate faction of the party formed the ⇒ Left Radical Party
- 1972: The ⇒ Socialdemocrat Party joined the party
- 1994: The party, who was unable to garner a significant number of votes in the parliamentary elections, joins the Party of Social Democracy and forms the Social Democrat Radical Party (Partido Radical Social Demócrata)

=== Liberal Democratic Party (1876) ===
- 1876: The faction of the ⇒ Liberal Party led by Benjamín Vicuña Mackenna formed the Liberal Democratic Party (Partido Liberal Democrático), but rejoins the ⇒ Liberal Party that same year

=== Independent Liberal Party ===
- 1885: An anti-government faction of the ⇒ Liberal Party formed the Independent Liberal Party (Partido Liberal Doctrinario)
- 1933: The party rejoined the ⇒ Liberal Party

=== Liberal Democratic Party (1892) ===
- 1891: The faction of the ⇒ Liberal Party that supported President José Manuel Balmaceda in the 1891 civil war formed the Liberal Democratic Party (Partido Liberal Democrático)
- 1933: The party rejoined the ⇒ Liberal Party

=== Unionist Liberal ===
- 1920: Dissidents from the ⇒ Liberal Party formed the Unionist Liberal (Liberal Unionista)
- 1927: The party didn't survive the 1927 dictatorship of Carlos Ibáñez.

=== United Liberal Party ===
- 1931: A faction of the ⇒ Liberal Party formed the United Liberal Party (Partido Liberal Unido)
- 1933: The party rejoined the ⇒ Liberal Party

=== Radical Socialist Party ===
- 1931: The more leftist faction formed the Radical Socialist Party (Partido Radical Socialista)
- 1941: A faction of the party rejoined the ⇒ Radical Party
- 1941: A faction of the party joined the ⇒ Socialist Party (Partido Socialista)

=== Radical Democratic Party ===
- 1946: A moderate faction of the ⇒ Radical Party formed the Radical Democratic Party (Partido Radical Democrático)
- 1949: The Radical Democratic Party rejoined the ⇒ Radical Party

=== Radical Doctrinal Party ===
- 1948: A faction opposition to the Law of Permanent Defense of Democracy (anti-Communist law) formed the ⇒ Radical Doctrinal Party (Partido Radical Doctrinario)
- 1961: A faction of the Radical Doctrinal Party rejoined the ⇒ Radical Party
- 1961: A faction of the Radical Doctrinal Party formed the ⇒ National Democratic Party (Partido Democrático Nacional)

=== Radical Democracy ===
- 1969: In reaction to growingly leftist tendencies in the ⇒ Radical Party a moderate, anti-Communist faction seceded as Radical Democracy (Democracia Radical).
- 1973: The party opposed Salvador Allende and voluntarily dissolved itself after the 1973 coup.
- 1988: The party reappeared to participate on the 1989 elections.
- 1990: The party, who was unable to garner a significant number of votes in the parliamentary elections, joins the National Advance and the National Party and forms the National Democracy of Center (Democracia Nacional de Centro).

=== Left Radical Party ===
- 1971: A moderate faction of the ⇒ Radical Party formed the Left Radical Party (Partido Izquierda Radical), later renamed the Chilean Social Democracy Party.
- 1994: The party fused with the Radical Party to form the Social Democrat Radical Party

== Liberal leaders ==
- Arturo Alessandri Palma

== See also ==
- History of Chile
- Politics of Chile
- List of political parties in Chile
