= Democratic Socialism (Chile) =

Democratic Socialism Socialismo Democrático
- Leader: Carolina Tohá Morales
- Party leaders: Paulina Vodanovic (PS); Natalia Piergentili (PPD); Leonardo Cubillos (PR); Patricio Morales (PL)
- Founded: 2021
- Preceded by: New Social Pact
- Headquarters: Santiago de Chile
- Ideology: Majority: Progressivism; Factions: Social democracy; Social liberalism
- Political position: Centre-left
- National affiliation: Government Alliance; All for Chile (majority); Unity for Chile (minority)
- Deputies: 30 / 155
- Senate: 13 / 50
- Communes: 62 / 345

Democratic Socialism (Spanish: Socialismo Democrático [sosjaˈlismo ðemoˈkɾatiko], SD) is a Chilean centre-left political coalition established on 2021, by the Socialist Party, Party for Democracy, Radical Party, Liberal Party and the platform New Deal.

The pact emerged after the de facto dissolution of the New Social Pact and did not include the Christian Democratic Party, which meant the end of the historic alliance between socialist and christian democrats, which had been in force since the transition to democracy in 1990.

In December 2021, Democratic Socialism was called to be part of the government of President Gabriel Boric. The parties joined a coalition with Apruebo Dignidad and came to government on March 11, 2022.

== International relations ==
On February 22, 2022, the leaders of the alliance traveled to Madrid, Spain, where they held a political meeting with former Prime Minister José Luis Rodríguez Zapatero (PSOE).

== Composition ==
Party	Ideology	Leader
Socialist Party; Partido Socialista	Social democracy	Paulina Vodanovic
Party for Democracy; Partido por la Democracia	Progressivism; Third Way; Social democracy	Natalia Piergentili (until 2023); Jaime Quintana (since 2023)
Radical Party; Partido Radical	Radicalism; Social liberalism	Leonardo Cubillos
Liberal Party of Chile; Partido Liberal	Social liberalism Progressivism	Patricio Morales
New Deal; Nuevo Trato	Progressivism; Social democracy	Pablo Vidal
