= New Social Pact =

New Social Pact Nuevo Pacto Social
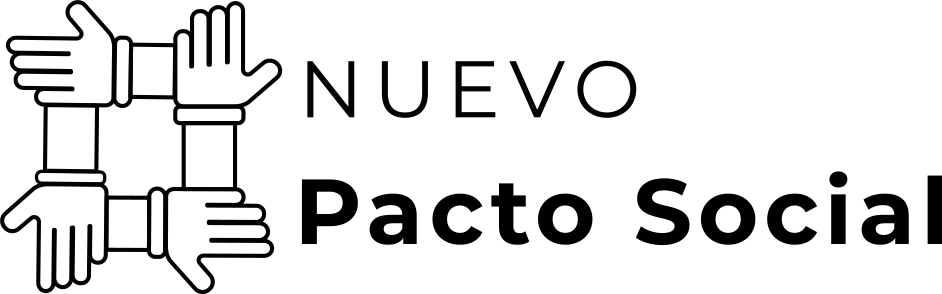
- Leader: Yasna Provoste
- Party leaders: Álvaro Elizalde (PS); Heraldo Muñoz (PPD); Carlos Maldonado Curti (PR); Carmen Frei (PDC); María Ignacia Gómez (CIU); Patricio Morales (PL)
- Founded: 23 August 2021
- Dissolved: December 2021
- Preceded by: Constituent Unity
- Succeeded by: Democratic Socialism
- Headquarters: Santiago de Chile
- Ideology: Third Way; Factions: Progressivism; Social democracy Social liberalism Christian democracy
- Political position: Center to center-left
- Member parties: Socialist Party; Party for Democracy; Radical Party; Christian Democratic Party; Citizens; Liberal Party; New Deal
- Colours: Purple

Website
- yasnapresidenta.cl

New Social Pact (Spanish: Nuevo Pacto Social [ˈnweβo ˈpaɣto soˈsjal], NPS) was a Chilean centre to centre-left political coalition established on 23 August 2021 in order to participate in the presidential and parliamentary elections of that year. This pact is made up of the parties for Democracy (PPD), Radical (PR), Socialist (PS), Christian Democratic (PDC), Citizens (CIU), Liberal (PL) and the platforms New Deal and New Chile.

After the 2021 election the PDC left the coalition due to conflicting views on joining Gabriel Boric's government, after which the coalition disbanded and most parties went on to form the Democratic Socialism alliance.

== History ==
The parties For Democracy, Radical, Socialist, Christian Democrats and Citizens formed together with the Progressive Party (PRO) and in alliance with the Liberal Party and the political platform New Deal the electoral pact called Constituent Unity, an instance that is still in force for the elections regional councilors by 2021. In the case of the parliamentary elections, by not reaching an agreement and after Marco Enríquez-Ominami's decision to stand for the presidential election not having participated in the citizen consultation process carried out that same year in which Yasna Provoste competed (PDC), Paula Narváez (PS) and Carlos Maldonado (PR) to define the sole presidential candidacy of the coalition, relations with the Progressive Party were broken and it was decided to register the list of candidates for Congress under the new name of «New Social Pact».

=== Citizen consultation of the Constituent Unity ===
Two days before the registration of candidacies for the presidential, parliamentary and regional councilor elections, Yasna Provoste is chosen as the candidate of the pact. Provoste triumphed in the citizen consultation of the Constituent Unity with 60.8% of the preferences.

=== Dissolution ===
The New Social Pact de facto ceased to exist when the PDC was not summoned at the end of 2021 to the parliamentary coordination of the PS-PPD-PR-PL-NT, a group that since December 2021 has been called "Democratic Socialism" and which was called to be part of the future government of President Gabriel Boric. On the other hand, the Citizens party lost its registration in the Electoral Service.

On 21 January 2022, the head of the committee of senators of the Christian Democratic Party, Francisco Huenchumilla, in a public statement signaled the end of the historical cycle of his party's alliance with the Socialists.

On 25 January 2022, the former minister, former senator and former president of the PDC, Ignacio Walker, argued that the PS-DC axis no longer exists and that as a party they must assume themselves as a minority that will do politics from the opposition.

== Composition ==
Party	President
Socialist Party of Chile	Álvaro Elizalde
Party for Democracy	Natalia Piergentili
Christian Democratic Party	Carmen Frei
Citizens	María Ignacia Gómez
Radical Party of Chile	Carlos Maldonado
Liberal Party of Chile	Patricio Morales

Also members of the coalition are the New Deal and New Chile political movements; the latter announced its entry into the coalition on 8 November 2021.
