= Radical Party of Chile (2018) =

Radical Party of Chile Partido Radical de Chile
- Leader: José Pérez Arriagada
- Secretary-General: Lorenna Saldías Yáñez
- Chief of Deputies: Marcela Hernando
- Founded: 18 August 1994; 31 years ago (as Social Democrat Radical Party)
- Merger of: Radical Party and Social Democracy Party
- Headquarters: Miraflores 495 Santiago
- Youth wing: Juventud Radical
- Membership (2026): 24,074 (10th)
- Ideology: Radicalism; Social liberalism; Social democracy
- Political position: Centre to centre-left
- National affiliation: Everything for Chile; Democratic Socialism; New Social Pact (2021); Constituent Unity (2020 to 2021)
- Regional affiliation: COPPPAL
- International affiliation: Socialist International
- Colours: Red
- Chamber of Deputies: 2 / 155
- Senate: 0 / 50
- Regional Councils: 12 / 278
- Mayors: 9 / 345
- Communal Councils: 171 / 2,252

Website
- partidoradical.cl

The Radical Party of Chile (Spanish: Partido Radical de Chile), is a classical radical political party in Chile. The party has also been referred to as liberal, social-liberal, and social-democratic.

The party is a member of Socialist International and participant in the Permanent Conference of Political Parties of Latin America and the Caribbean.

== History ==
The party was founded as the Social Democrat Radical Party (Partido Radical Socialdemócrata) on 18 August 1994 out of a union between the Radical Party and the Social Democracy Party, both of which had received poor results in the parliamentary elections. The party re-adopted its historic name in 2018.

The party supported Ricardo Lagos in the 1999–2000 presidential elections, who won 48.0% in the first round and was elected with 51.3% in the second round. At the 2001 legislative elections, the party won as part of the Concertación six out of 120 seats in the Chamber of Deputies and no seats in the Senate. This changed at the 2005 legislative elections to seven and one, respectively. In 2009, it won five congress seats and one senate seat.

== Executive board ==
The current party executive assumed in August 2018.

| Position | Name |
|---|---|
| President | Leonardo Cubillos Ramírez |
| First Vice President | Alberto Robles MP |
| Second Vice President | Marcela Hernando |
| Third Vice President | Fernando Meza MP |
| Vice President for Women | Jacqueline Castillo |
| Secretary-General | Mauricio Andrews |
| Under-secretary General | Leonardo Cubillos |
| Secretary for Control and Organisation | Oscar Araya |
| Treasurer | Mario Perez |
| Secretary for Regions | Eduardo Vivanco |
| Electoral Secretary | Rosa Fuenzalida |
| International Secretary | Ricardo Navarrete |
| Secretary for Communications | Robert Guevara |

== Leaders of the PR (1994–present) ==
| Leader | Titles in office | Took office | Left office | Notes |
|---|---|---|---|---|
| Anselmo Sule | Senator for O'Higgins (until 1998) | 18 August 1994 | 7 June 2002 (died in office) | First directly elected leader of the PRSD. |
| Orlando Cantuarias (acting) | None | 7 June 2002 | 25 October 2002 | Acting leader after Sule's death |
| Patricio Tombolini | Under-Secretary for Transport | 25 October 2002 | 7 January 2003 | Second directly elected leader. Resigned after a Corruption scandal (Caso Coimas) as the First Deputy Leader. |
| Orlando Cantuarias (acting) | None | 7 January 2003 | 3 April 2004 | Acting leader after Tombolini's resignation as the First Deputy Leader. |
| Augusto Parra (acting) | Senator appointed by the President of Chile as a former chancellor of the University of Concepción | 3 April 2004 | 19 April 2004 | Appointed as Acting leader by the PRSD National Committee |
| Enrique Silva Cimma | Senator appointed by the Comptroller General of Chile | 19 April 2004 | 28 February 2005 | Appointed as Leader by the PRSD National Committee |
| José Antonio Gómez Urrutia | Senator for Antofagasta | 28 February 2005 | 30 December 2009 | Third directly elected leader. Resigned after the 2009 Chilean parliamentary election |
| Fernando Meza (acting) | MP for Toltén valley | 30 December 2009 | 21 January 2010 | Acting leader after Gomez's resignation as the First Deputy Leader. |
| José Antonio Gómez Urrutia | Senator for Antofagasta | 21 January 2010 | 15 March 2014 | Appointed as Leader by the PRSD National Committee |
| Ricardo Navarrete (acting) | None | 15 March 2014 | 16 May 2014 | Acting leader after Gomez's resignation as the First Deputy Leader. He resigned to be Chilean ambassador in Colombia. |
| Iván Mesías Lehu (acting) | None | 16 May 2014 | 4 August 2014 | Acting leader after Navarrete's resignation as the Second Deputy Leader. |
| Ernesto Velasco | None | 4 August 2014 | Incumbent | Fourth directly elected leader of the party. |

== Election results ==
Due to its membership in the Concert of Parties for Democracy, the party has endorsed the candidates of other parties on several occasions. Presidential elections in Chile are held using a two-round system, the results of which are displayed below.

=== Presidential elections ===
Elections for President of Chile
| Date | Candidate | Party | Round I | Round II | Result |
| Date | Candidate | Party | % | % | Result |
|---|---|---|---|---|---|
| 1999 | Ricardo Lagos | PPD | 48.0 | 51.3 | Victory |
| 2005 | Michelle Bachelet | PS | 46.0 | 53.5 | Victory |
| 2009 | Eduardo Frei Ruiz-Tagle | PDC | 29.6 | 48.4 | Defeat |
| 2013 | Michelle Bachelet | PS | 46.7 | 62.2 | Victory |
| 2017 | Alejandro Guillier | Independent | 22.7 | 45.4 | Defeat |
| 2021 | Yasna Provoste | PDC | 11.6 | | Defeat |
| 2025 | Jeannette Jara | PCCh | 26.85 | 41.84 | Defeat |

== See also ==
- Liberalism and radicalism in Chile
- List of political parties in Chile
