= Jaime Quintana =

Chilean politician

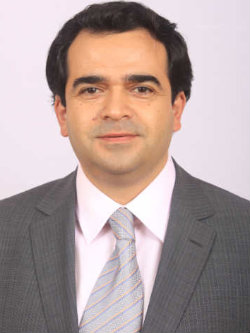

President of the Senate of Chile
- In office 12 March 2019 – 17 March 2020
- Preceded by: Carlos Montes Cisternas
- Succeeded by: Adriana Muñoz D'Albora

Member of the Senate of Chile
- In office 11 March 2018 – 11 March 2026
- Preceded by: Creation of the Circunscription
- Constituency: 11th Circunscription (Atacama Region)
- In office 11 March 2010 – 11 March 2018
- Preceded by: Roberto Muñoz Barra
- Succeeded by: Dissolution of the District

President of the Party for Democracy
- In office 11 June 2012 – 11 June 2016
- Preceded by: Carolina Tohá
- Succeeded by: Gonzalo Navarrete

Member of the Chamber of Deputies
- In office 11 March 2002 – 11 March 2010
- Preceded by: Miguel Hernández Saffirio
- Succeeded by: Fuad Chahín
- Constituency: 49th District

Personal details
- Born: 22 August 1967 (age 58) Lautaro, Chile
- Party: Socialist Party; Party for Democracy (1997–present)
- Spouse: Susana Aguilera
- Children: Two
- Parent(s): Daniel Quintana; Blanca Leal
- Education: Pontifical Catholic University of Chile
- Occupation: Politician

Jaime Daniel Quintana Leal (born 22 October 1967) is a Chilean politician.

He was President of the Senate of Chile.

== Biography ==
He was born on 22 October 1967 in Lautaro. He is the son of Daniel Quintana Lizama and Blanca Nieves Leal Lizama.

He is married to sociologist Susana Aguilera, former mayor of Vilcún for two terms (2012–2016 and 2017–2021), and is the father of two daughters.

Quintana completed his primary education at Escuela Municipal Manuel Rodríguez and his secondary education at Liceo Pablo Neruda in Temuco. In 1986, he entered the Pontifical Catholic University of Chile, where he studied Literature and obtained a degree in Educational Sciences and the professional title of State Teacher with a specialization in Spanish in 1990.

He later completed five years of Law studies at the Temuco Catholic University. He also attended courses in decentralized public management at the University of La Frontera in Temuco and in budgetary administration at the University of Chile.

Professionally, he worked as a Literature professor at various universities and institutes in the Araucanía Region.

== Political career ==
Quintana began his political activity in the 1980s during his school and university years as a student leader linked to the Socialist Party. He later joined the Party for Democracy (PPD), where he served as a national party leader.

In the 1997 elections, he ran as a candidate for the Chamber of Deputies but was not elected. He subsequently served as Chief of Staff of the Intendancy of the Araucanía Region, repeatedly assuming the duties of Acting Intendant.

In 1999, prior to running for Parliament, he was a member of the Special Commission tasked with analyzing the report of the Commission on Historical Truth and New Deal and the proposals arising from the Mapuche communal dialogues organized by Ministry of Planning (MIDEPLAN) based on the UNDP Human Development Report.

On 13 May 2012, he participated in the internal elections of the Party for Democracy representing the list “Chile mejor desde la izquierda,” which emerged victorious. On 11 June 2012, he formally assumed the presidency of the party's executive committee, a position he held until 2016.

He ran as a candidate for deputy for the 23rd District of the Araucanía Region in the parliamentary elections held on 16 November 2025, representing the Party for Democracy within the Unidad por Chile coalition. He was not elected, obtaining 18,423 votes, equivalent to 4.30% of the valid votes cast.
