= Natalia Piergentili =

Chilean politician

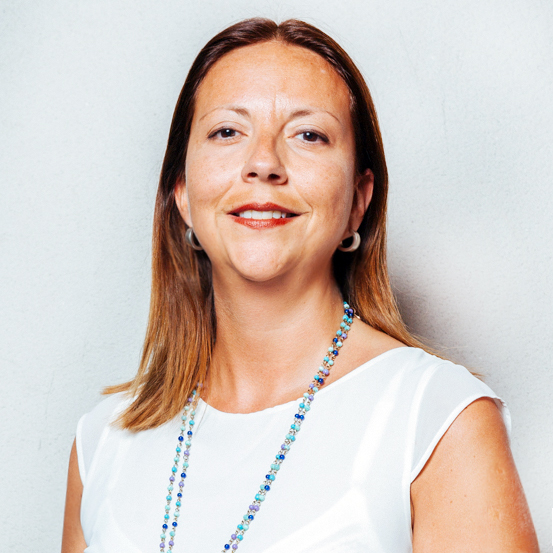

Undersecretary of Economy and Small Enterprises
- In office 20 October 2015 – 11 March 2018
- President: Michelle Bachelet
- Preceded by: Karla Trusich
- Succeeded by: Ignacio Guerrero Toro

Personal details
- Born: 14 August 1978 (age 48) Santiago, Chile
- Party: Party for Democracy
- Education: University of Santiago, Chile (BA); Autonomous University of Barcelona (PgD); University of Chile (PgD); Complutense University of Madrid (MA)
- Occupation: Politician
- Profession: Public administrator

Natalia Alejandra Piergentili Domenech (born 14 August 1978) is a Chilean politician who served as president of the Party for Democracy from August 2021 to September 2023.
