= Humanist Action =

Defunct political party in Chile (2020–2026)

Humanist Action Acción Humanista
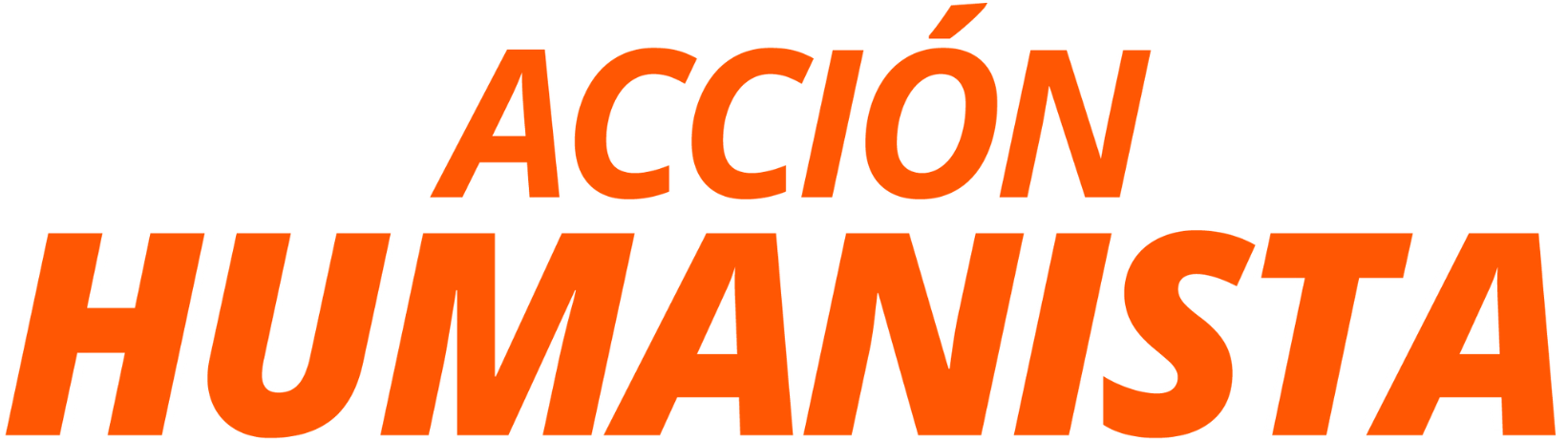
- Leader: Tomás Hirsch
- Founded: 30 July 2020
- Registered: 30 September 2022
- Dissolved: 12 February 2026
- Split from: Humanist Party
- Headquarters: 210 Jorge Washington, Ñuñoa
- Ideology: Universal humanism Libertarian socialism Radical democracy
- Political position: Left-wing
- National affiliation: Chile Digno (2020–2022); Apruebo Dignidad (2020–2023); Unidad por Chile (2022–2025); VRH (2025–2026)
- Colours: Orange

Website
- Official website

Humanist Action (Spanish: Acción Humanista) was a Chilean left-wing political party, founded in 2020 by former militants of the Humanist Party. Its leader was Tomás Hirsch, who was a presidential candidate in 1999 and 2005. It was dissolved on 16 February 2026.

The movement was formed after the resignation of 300 members of the Humanist Party, who rejected the role of deputy Pamela Jiles in the party.

Humanist Action was part of the Chile Digno coalition and Apruebo Dignidad. In the 2021 elections they supported the presidential candidate Gabriel Boric.

== Presidential candidates ==
The following is a list of the presidential candidates supported by the Humanist Action. (Information gathered from the Archive of Chilean Elections).

- 2021: Gabriel Boric (won)
- 2025: Jeannette Jara (lost)

== Election results ==
=== Congress elections ===
Election year	Chamber of Deputies			Senate			Status
Election year	# Votes	% Votes	Seats	# Votes	% Votes	Seats	Status
2025	282,468	2.64%	1 / 155	42,923	1.39%	0 / 50	Opposition
