= Christian Democratic Party (Chile) =

Political party in Chile

Christian Democratic Party Partido Demócrata Cristiano
- Leader: Álvaro Ortiz Vera
- President: Álvaro Ortiz Vera
- Secretary-General: Alejandra Krauss
- Chief of Deputies: Jorge Díaz
- Chief of Senators: Yasna Provoste
- Founded: 28 July 1957; 69 years ago
- Merger of: Social Christian Conservative Party; National Falange
- Headquarters: Alameda 1460, Santiago de Chile
- Student wing: Democracia Cristiana Universitaria
- Youth wing: Juventud Demócrata Cristiana
- Membership (2026): 24,707 (9th)
- Ideology: Christian democracy; Political Catholicism; Third Way; Factions: Social conservatism (previously); Progressivism; Feminism (dissident faction as of 2018)
- Political position: Centre to centre-left
- Religion: Christianity
- National affiliation: Democratic Opposition Federation (1972–1973); Confederation of Democracy (1972–1973); Democratic Alliance (1983–1988); Concertación (1988–2013); Nueva Mayoría (2013–2018); Constituent Unity (2020–2021); New Social Pact (2021); All for Chile (2023); Unidad por Chile (since 2022)
- International affiliation: Centrist Democrat International
- Regional affiliation: Christian Democrat Organization of America (suspended as of 2025)
- Colours: Blue
- Chamber of Deputies: 8 / 155
- Senate: 3 / 50
- Regional Boards: 29 / 302
- Mayors: 23 / 345
- Communal Councils: 162 / 2,252
- Regional Governors: 0 / 16

Party flag

Website
- www.pdc.cl

The Christian Democratic Party (Spanish: Partido Demócrata Cristiano, PDC), commonly known as Christian Democracy (Spanish: Democracia Cristiana, DC) is a Christian democratic political party in Chile. There have been three Christian Democrat presidents in the past, Eduardo Frei Ruiz-Tagle, Patricio Aylwin, and Eduardo Frei Montalva.

Customarily, the PDC backs specific initiatives in an effort to bridge socialism and laissez-faire capitalism. This economic system has been called "social capitalism" and is heavily influenced by Catholic social teaching or, more generally, Christian ethics. In addition to this objective, the PDC also supports a strong national government while remaining more conservative on social issues. However, after Pinochet's military regime ended the PDC embraced more classical economic policies compared to before the dictatorship. The current Secretary-General of the PDC is Gonzalo Duarte. In their latest "Ideological Congress", the Christian Democrats criticized Chile's current economic system and called for a shift toward a social market economy (economía social de mercado). The PDC had cooperated with centre-left parties after the end of Pinochet rule.

With the exception of the 1973 - 1989 period (due to the dissolution of the National Congress by Pinochet's Military Junta), the PDC was the largest party in Parliament between 1965 to 2001. In 2022, the party has faced a severe internal crisis, with many prominent politicians leaving it.

== History ==
The origins of the party go back to the 1930s, when the Conservative Party split between traditionalist and social-Christian sectors. In 1935, the social-Christians split from the Conservative Party to form the Falange Nacional (National Phalanx), a more socially oriented and centrist group.

The Falange Nacional showed their centrist policies by supporting leftist Juan Antonio Ríos (Radical Party of Chile) in the 1942 presidential elections but Conservative Eduardo Cruz-Coke in the 1946 elections. Despite the creation of the Falange Nacional, many social-Christians remained in the Conservative Party, which in 1949 split into the Social Christian Conservative Party and the Traditionalist Conservative Party. On July 28, 1957, primarily to back the presidential candidacy of Eduardo Frei Montalva, the Falange Nacional, Social Christian Conservative Party, and other like-minded groups joined to form the Christian Democratic Party. Frei lost the elections, but presented his candidacy again in 1964, this time also supported by the right-wing parties. That year, Frei triumphed with 56% of the vote. Despite right-wing backing for his candidacy, Frei declared his planned social revolution would not be hampered by this support.

In 1970, Radomiro Tomic, leader of the left-wing faction of the party, was nominated to the presidency, but lost to socialist Salvador Allende. The Christian Democrat vote was crucial in the Congressional confirmation of Allende's election, since he had received less than the necessary 50%. Although the Christian Democratic Party voted to confirm Allende's election, they declared themselves as part opposition because of Allende's economic policy. By 1973, Allende had lost the support of most Christian Democrats (except for Tomic's left-wing faction), some of whom even began calling for the military to step in. By the time of Pinochet's coup, most Christian Democrats applauded the military takeover, believing that the government would quickly be turned over to them by the military. Once it became clear that Pinochet had no intention of relinquishing power, the Christian Democrats went into opposition. During the 1981 plebiscite where Chilean voted to extend Pinochet's term for eight more years, Eduardo Frei Montalva led the only authorized opposition rally. When political parties were legalized again, the Christian Democratic Party, together with most left-wing parties, agreed to form the Coalition of Parties for the No, which opposed Pinochet's reelection on the 1988 plebiscite. This coalition later became Coalition of Parties for Democracy once Pinochet stepped down from power and held together until 2010s.

=== Transition to democracy ===
Logo used on advertising since 2020.

During the first years of the return to democracy, the Christian Democrats enjoyed wide popular support. Presidents Patricio Aylwin and Eduardo Frei Ruiz-Tagle were both from that party, and it was also the largest party in Congress. However, the Christian Democrat Andrés Zaldívar lost the Coalition of Parties for Democracy 1999 primaries to socialist Ricardo Lagos. In the parliamentary elections of 2005, the Christian Democrats lost eight seats in Congress, and the right-wing Independent Democratic Union became the largest party in the legislative body. The Christian Democrats lost its influence to the socialists after Michelle Bachelet became president.

For much of the 1990s and 2000s the party contained three main factions; "Guatones", "Chascones" and "Colorines" (lit. Fatsos, Disheveleds and Redheads). The Colorines owed their name to the hair color of Adolfo Zaldívar and were the right-wing faction of the party. The Chascones led by Gabriel Silber and Gabriel Ascencio were the left-wing faction and the Guatones owed their label for being "close to power" through the figures of Eduardo Frei Ruiz-Tagle and Patricio Aylwin, both of them Presidents of Chile.

In recent years, the Christian Democrats have favored abortion in three cases (when a pregnancy threatens the mother's life, when the fetus has little chance of survival, and when the pregnancy is a result of rape), but not in any other instances, and opposes elective abortion.

The Christian Democrats left the Nueva Mayoría coalition on 29 April 2017 and nominated then-party president Carolina Goic as their candidate for the 2017 presidential election. The Nueva Mayoria has struggled to remain united as differences have opened up within the coalition over approaches to a government reform drive, including changes to the labour code and attempted reform of Chile's strict abortion laws. In 2020, all Christian Democrats senators voted in favour of same-sex marriage.

In 2020, the party gave its support for "Approve" in the 2020 Chilean national plebiscite.

After the 2019–2021 Chilean protests most of La Nueva Mayoria including the PDC regrouped to form Constituent Unity and participated in the 2021 constitutional convention election (as The Approval List) and the 2021 gubernatorial elections.

After those elections the group renamed to New Social Pact to participate in the 2021 general election, PDC senator Yasna Provoste was chosen as the coalition's candidate, coming in 5th place with 11.6% of the vote. After she lost the first round the PDC supported Gabriel Boric for the second round, in which Boric won the election.

After Boric won the election, most of the New Social Pact parties supported joining Boric's government, on the other hand the Christian Democrat's president, Ximena Rincon, said that the party would be a "constructive opposition" and said that any member joining the government should have to resign to the party. After this the PDC was excluded from the new coalition "Democratic Socialism".

=== 2022 crisis ===
The official support of the party for the "Approve" option in the 2022 Chilean national plebiscite has led a severe internal division, with various members openly supporting the "Reject" option and subsequent calls for them to be expelled. Some historic figures, like René Cortázar, Soledad Alvear, Gutenberg Martínez and José Pablo Arellano left the party by their own initiative to join Cristián Warnken's Amarillos movement. Ximena Rincón and Matías Walker left the party in October 2022 to form the political movement Demócratas together with Carlos Maldonado and others. Also in October, Governor of Santiago Metropolitan Region Claudio Orrego left the party.

Fuad Chahín, who was president of the party from 2018 to 2021, was suspended from the party in early November 2022.

=== Suspension from the ODCA ===
In 2025, the party controversially endorsed presidential candidate Jeannette Jara, member of the Communist Party of Chile, in the 2025 Chilean general election. This prompted the organization to suspend the party on August 9, 2025, as "the Communist Party of Chile has ideological affinities with authoritarian regimes responsible for human rights violations, such as those in Venezuela, Cuba, and Nicaragua. This support not only contradicts the historical legacy of Christian Humanism in Chile, but also undermines the ODCA's international credibility as a defender of democracy and republican values."

== Presidents elected under Christian Democratic Party ==
- Eduardo Frei Montalva (1964–1970)
- Patricio Aylwin (1990–1994)
- Eduardo Frei Ruiz-Tagle (1994–2000)

== Election results ==
=== Presidential ===
Information gathered from the Archive of Chilean Elections.

| Election year | Candidate | Popular vote | | Contingent election | |
| Election year | Candidate | # of votes | % of vote | Contingent election | |
|---|---|---|---|---|---|
| 1958 | Eduardo Frei Montalva | 255,769 | 20.70 (#3) | did not advance | |
| 1964 | Eduardo Frei Montalva | 1,409,012 | 56.09 (#1) | —N/a | |
| 1970 | Radomiro Tomic | 821,801 | 28.11 (#3) | did not advance | |
| Election year | Candidate | 1st round | | 2nd round | |
| Election year | Candidate | # votes | % votes | # votes | % votes |
| 1988 (plebiscite) | Against Augusto Pinochet | 3,967,579 | 55.99 (#1) | —N/a | |
| 1989 | Patricio Aylwin | 3,850,571 | 55.17 (#1) | —N/a | |
| 1993 | Eduardo Frei Ruiz-Tagle | 4,044,898 | 57.98 (#1) | —N/a | |
| 1999 | Andrés Zaldívar (defeated in Concertación primary) | Supported Ricardo Lagos | | Supported Ricardo Lagos | |
| 2005 | Soledad Alvear (withdrew) | Supported Michelle Bachelet | | Supported Michelle Bachelet | |
| 2009 | Eduardo Frei Ruiz-Tagle | 2,065,061 | 29.60 (#2) | 3,367,790 | 48.39 (#2) |
| 2013 | Claudio Orrego (defeated in Nueva Mayoría primary) | Supported Michelle Bachelet | | Supported Michelle Bachelet | |
| 2017 | Carolina Goic | 387,784 | 5.88 (#5) | Supported Alejandro Guillier | |
| 2021 | Yasna Provoste | 815,563 | 11.60 (#5) | Supported Gabriel Boric | |
| 2025 | Alberto Undurraga (withdrew) | Supported Jeannette Jara | | Supported Jeannette Jara | |

=== Chamber of Deputies ===
Chamber of Deputies Election
| Election | Leader | Votes | % | Seats | +/- | Coalition | President |
|---|---|---|---|---|---|---|---|
| 1961 | Narciso Irueta | 213,468 | 15.93% | 23 / 147 | N/A | | Jorge Alessandri (Ind.) |
| 1965 | Renán Fuentealba | 995,187 | 43.60% | 82 / 147 | +59 | | Eduardo Frei (PDC) |
| 1969 | Rafael Agustín Gumucio | 716,547 | 31.05% | 55 / 150 | −27 | | Eduardo Frei Montalva (PDC) |
| 1973 | Renán Fuentealba | 1,055,120 | 29.07% | 50 / 150 | −5 | Confederation of Democracy | Salvador Allende (PS) |
Congress Suspended (1973–1989)
| 1989 | Andrés Zaldívar | 1,766,347 | 25.99% | 38 / 120 | N/A | Concertación | Patricio Aylwin (PDC) |
| 1993 | Gutenberg Martínez | 1,827,373 | 27.12% | 37 / 120 | −1 | Concertación | Eduardo Frei Ruiz-Tagle (PDC) |
| 1997 | Enrique Krauss | 1,331,745 | 22.98% | 38 / 120 | +1 | Concertación | Eduardo Frei Ruiz-Tagle (PDC) |
| 2001 | Patricio Aylwin | 1,162,210 | 18.92% | 23 / 120 | −15 | Concertación | Ricardo Lagos (PPD) |
| 2005 | Adolfo Zaldívar | 1,354,631 | 20.78% | 20 / 120 | −3 | Concertación | Michelle Bachelet (PS) |
| 2009 | Juan Carlos Latorre | 931,789 | 14.24% | 19 / 120 | −1 | Concertación | Sebastián Piñera (RN) |
| 2013 | Ignacio Walker | 965,364 | 15.56% | 22 / 120 | +3 | New Majority | Michelle Bachelet (PS) |
| 2017 | Carolina Goic | 616,550 | 10.28% | 14 / 155 | −8 | Democratic Convergence | Sebastian Piñera (Ind.) |
| 2021 | Yasna Provoste | 264,985 | 4.19% | 8 / 155 | −6 | New Social Pact | Gabriel Boric (CS) |
| 2025 | Francisco Huenchumilla | 454,544 | 4.24% | 8 / 155 | 0 | Unidad por Chile | José Antonio Kast (CpCh) |
