= Liberal Party (Chile, 2013) =

Political party in Chile

Liberal Party of Chile Partido Liberal de Chile
- President: Juan Carlos Urzúa
- Founder: Vlado Mirosevic
- Founded: 26 January 2013
- Headquarters: Santiago de Chile
- Membership (2026): 13,030 (14th)
- Ideology: Social liberalism Progressivism; Green liberalism
- Political position: Centre to centre-left
- National affiliation: Unity for Chile; Democratic Socialism; New Social Pact (2021); Constituent Unity (2020 to 2021); Broad Front (2016 to 2020)
- International affiliation: Liberal International
- Colours: Orange (until 2022); Pink (from 2022)
- Chamber of Deputies: 3 / 155
- Senate: 1 / 50

Website
- www.liberaleschile.cl

The Liberal Party of Chile (Spanish: Partido Liberal de Chile) is a political party in Chile, founded 26 January 2013 in Santiago, Chile. The main figure of the party is the deputy Vlado Mirosevic.

== Ideology ==
The Liberal Party of Chile states itself to be a social-liberal party, promoting egalitarian liberalism and progressivism.

=== Chilean social liberalism ===
In Chile, the word liberal is, after the dictatorship of Augusto Pinochet, often synonymous with technocracy, classic liberalism and economic liberalism. The Liberal Party of Chile is based on social liberalism and thus opposes the neoliberalism that still influences many Chilean institutions. Following the tradition of the first liberals of the 19th century, the Liberal Party of Chile intends to combine its economic policy with a strong social policy.

=== Platform ===
The Liberal Party of Chile supports same-sex marriage, the legalisation of marijuana, the legalisation of abortion and the legalisation of euthanasia. Further, they support decentralization, which also opposes the heritage of Pinochet who implemented centralism in the country. Finally, the party supports changing the Chilean constitution implemented by Pinochet in 1980.

== History ==
=== Chilean social-liberal tradition ===
The Liberal Party of Chile is inspired by the tradition of Chilean liberals from before the rise of Pinochet and Chilean neoliberalism. They supported a federal state, hated tyranny and concentration of power and wanted the secular state to promote social rights such as public education. The Liberal Party of Chile is inspired by these ideas in, for example, their support for free education for all. Among the figures of the liberal party of the 20th century were Ramón Freire, José Miguel Infante, Francisco Bilbao, Pedro León Gallo Goyenechea, Domingo Santa María and José Manuel Balmaceda.

=== Chilean political context ===
In Chile the historic Liberal Party ceased to exist in 1966 when it merged with the United Conservative Party, giving rise to the National Party which supported the coup d'état of 1973 However historical liberal ideas such as the defence of civil rights were not practised during the dictatorship. The system established in Chile during the dictatorship was not challenged much until the late 2000s and early 2010s. The Chilean student protests of 2011 showed for the first time in 35 years the discomfort of a group of people with the Chilean political system which was criticized for excessively favouring the privatization of education. The demonstrations criticized using the market as the main resource allocator and the private sector to manage many public services. The criticism also targeted the constitution, since major legislative changes require super-majorities in the congress while the electoral system favours two political blocs, which impedes political processes.

=== Birth of Liberal Party of Chile ===
The Liberal Party of Chile originated in the ChileFirst (ChilePrimero) movement. ChileFirst was a political movement created in 2007 by former members of the Party for Democracy (Partido por la Democracia) led by Senator Fernando Flores Labra and supporting the candidature of Sebastián Piñera in the presidential election of 2009 and 2010.

After a break with the original founders, on 26 January 2013 the party was officially formed as the Liberal Party of Chile (Partido Liberal de Chile), a name change from the existing ChilePrimero. The majority of the founders were young, a part of the middle class and not previously members of other parties. They were inspired by the ideals of the Chilean liberalism from the 19th century and especially by the values of secularism, democratic reforms and freedom of initiative.

On 15 June 2013 the party announced the formation of an electoral alliance with the Progressive Party (Partido Progresista – PRO) and decided to support Marco Enríquez-Ominami for president in the election of 2013. The pact was called "If you want, Chile changes" (Si tu quieres, Chile cambia) and included the Liberal party of Chile with deputies, senators and regional councilors supporting it. In the parliamentary elections of 2013 the party's President Vlado Milosevic was elected as deputy of the 1. district, the Region of Arica and Parinacota. In 2017 the party joined the left-wing coalition Frente Amplio. It won a Senate seat in 2025 under the Unidad por Chile coalition.

== Presidential candidates ==
The following is a list of the presidential candidates supported by the Liberal Party. (Information gathered from the Archive of Chilean Elections).

- 2013: Marco Enríquez-Ominami (lost)
- 2017: Beatriz Sánchez (lost)
- 2021: Yasna Provoste (lost)
- 2025: Jeannette Jara

== Electoral results ==
=== Parliamentary elections ===
Parliamentary election results for deputies in District 1 (Arica, Camarones, General Lagos and Putre)

| Election | Deputies | | |
| Election | Votes | % of the votes | Seats |
|---|---|---|---|
| 2013 | 14,237 | 21,25 | Vlado Mirosevic |
| 2017 | 24,273 | 32,43 | Vlado Mirosevic |

Parliamentary election results for deputies in District 26 (Ancud, Calbuco, Castro, Chaitén, Chonchi, Cochamó, Curaco de Vélez, Dalcahue, Futaleufú, Hualaihué, Maullín, Palena, Puerto Montt, Puqueldón, Queilén, Quellón, Quemchi and Quinchao)

| Election | Deputies | | |
| Election | Votes | % of the votes | Seats |
|---|---|---|---|
| 2017 | 6,200 | 3,87 | Alejandro Bernales |

=== Leaders ===
- President: Juan Carlos Urzúa
- Vice president (Valparaíso): Juan Carlos García (2021–present)
- Vice president: Alejandra Cortés (2021–present)
- Vice president: Guillermo Moreno (2021–present)
- Secretary General: Nicole Troncoso (2021–present)

== Authorities ==
=== Deputies ===
| Name | Region | District | Period |
|---|---|---|---|
| Vlado Mirosevic | Region of Arica and Parinacota | 1 | 2014–2018 / 2018-2022 |
| Alejandro Bernales | Region of Los Lagos | 26 | 2018-2022 |
