= Party for Democracy (Chile) =

Political party in Chile

Party for Democracy Partido por la Democracia
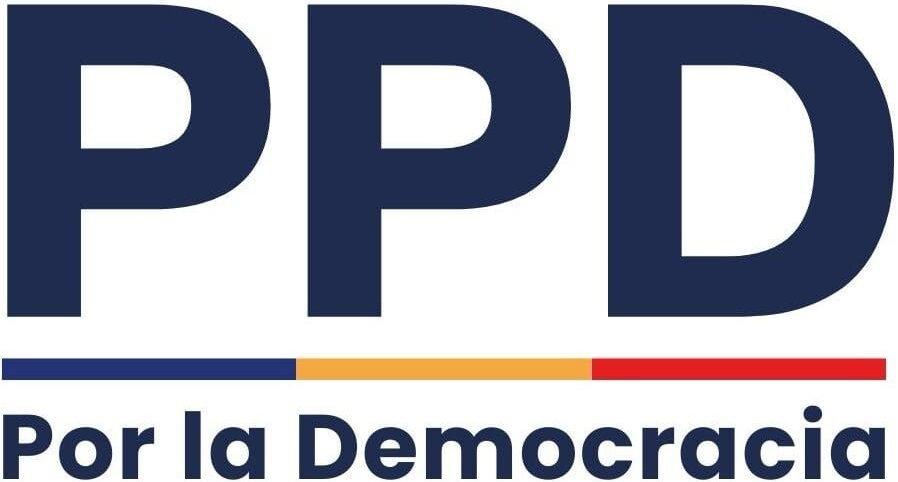
- Abbreviation: PPD
- President: Raúl Soto
- Secretary-General: Sebastián Vergara
- Chief of Senators: Loreto Carvajal
- Chief of Deputies: Raúl Soto
- Founded: 15 December 1987; 38 years ago
- Headquarters: Santo Domingo 1828; Santiago
- Youth wing: Juventud PPD
- Membership (2026): 26,611 (8th)
- Ideology: Progressivism; Third Way; Social democracy
- Political position: Centre-left
- National affiliation: Everything for Chile; Democratic Socialism; New Social Pact (2021); Constituent Unity (2020–2021)
- Regional affiliation: COPPPAL
- International affiliation: Progressive Alliance; Socialist International
- Colours: Blue, Yellow and Red
- Chamber of Deputies: 9 / 155
- Senate: 4 / 50
- Regional Councillors: 12 / 302
- Mayors: 8 / 345
- Communal Councillors: 81 / 2,252

Website
- www.ppd.cl

The Party for Democracy (Spanish: Partido por la Democracia, PPD), also known as For Democracy (Spanish: Por la Democracia) is a centre-left political party in Chile. It states to stand in the traditions of liberal progressivism. It was founded in December 1987 by Ricardo Lagos, who aimed at forming a legal social-democratic party, as the Socialist Party of Chile (PS) remained illegal at the time. The PPD continued to function after the defeat of Pinochet. Until 1997, double membership of PPD and the PS was allowed.

The party nominated, as part of the Concertación (Coalition of Parties for Democracy), in the 1999/2000 presidential elections, Ricardo Lagos Escobar, the main leader of the party. He would later win 48.0% of the vote in the first round and was ultimately elected with 51.3% in the second round. At the 2001 legislative election, the party ran as part of the Coalition of Parties for Democracy and won 20 out of 120 seats in the Chamber of Deputies and 3 out of 38 elected seats in the Senate. This changed at the 2005 elections to 21 and 3. In the 2009 elections, it won 18 seats in the Chamber of Deputies and 4 in the Senate.

== Ideology ==
The party's ideology can be variously defined as liberal, progressive, liberal-progressive, and social-democrat.

In the first few years of the party, it had difficulty establishing a well-defined ideology, due to the political diversity of its founders, who ranged from communist militants to members of the National Party. Eventually it converged on a combination of social democracy and social liberalism (called progressive liberalism in the early years of the party). Currently, according to its "Declaration of Principles," the PPD describes itself as "a left[ist] political party, democratic, progressive and [in favor of] parity".

In 2007, a large part of the party's social-liberal wing broke off to form ChilePrimero, which would eventually become the Liberal Party.

== History ==
The Party for Democracy (PPD) was founded on 15 December 1987 as an instrumental political organization whose primary objective was to finish with the military regime and achieve again democracy in Chile by peaceful, political means, taking advantage of the opportunity to mobilize the Chileans who represented the plebiscite by means of which the dictator Augusto Pinochet sought to extend its mandate.

Its founder, Ricardo Lagos, later President of Chile (2000-2006), said in the ceremony of constitution of the party that the only requirements to integrate the ranks of the PPD were: "to be against the institutional system of the regime of the dictator Pinochet because it does not lead to democracy, and in addition want to defeat it by political means".

People were admitted to the party of various ideologies including socialism, radicalism, social democrats, liberal progressives, left-wing Christians, Mapucists, communists, and young people up to the national student movement of the 1980s opponents of Augusto Pinochet, among them the Movement G-80.

The PPD vigorously pushed to ensure that the "No" option won the 1988 plebiscite, which restored free elections to the nation. Participated in the formation of the Concertación, political alliance that has dominated the Chilean government since the end of the military government until 2010, when Sebastián Piñera representing the Coalition for change came to power.

== Election results ==
Due to its membership in the Concert of Parties for Democracy, the party has endorsed the candidates of other parties on several occasions, as well as due to the fact that presidential elections in Chile are held using a two-round system.

=== Presidential elections ===
Elections for the President of Chile
Date	Candidate	Party	Round I	Round II	Result
Date	Candidate	Party	%	%	Result
1989	Patricio Aylwin	PDC	55.2		victory
1993	Eduardo Frei Ruiz-Tagle	PDC	58.0		victory
1999	Ricardo Lagos	PPD	48.0	51.3	victory
2005	Michelle Bachelet	PS	46.0	53.5	victory
2009	Eduardo Frei Ruiz-Tagle	PDC	29.6	48.4	defeat
2013	Michelle Bachelet	PS	46.7	62.2	victory
2017	Alejandro Guillier	Ind.	22.7	45.4	defeat
2021	Yasna Provoste	PDC	11.6		defeat
2025	Jeannette Jara	PCCh	26.85	41.84	defeat

== See also ==
- Category:Party for Democracy (Chile) politicians
