= Regional governments of Chile =

Regional governments of Chile (Spanish: gobiernos regionales, GORE) are public bodies responsible for the superior administration of each of the regions of Chile. Their purpose is to promote social, cultural, and territorial development within their jurisdiction. Each regional government is headquartered in the capital city of its region, although it may temporarily operate elsewhere within the region.

Regional governments are composed of two bodies: the regional governor of Chile, elected by popular vote for a four-year term (renewable once), and the regional council, whose members are elected by universal suffrage in direct elections for four-year terms.

The regional council was created through a constitutional reform in 1991 and implemented by Law No. 19,175 in 1992. The first regional governments were installed in 1993.

Internal government representation of the President of the Republic in each region is exercised separately by the presidential regional delegate.

A constitutional reform in 2017 established the direct election of the regional executive authority, creating the office of regional governor and replacing the former office of regional intendant.

Regional governments operate in accordance with principles that guide public administration and territorial development. Their actions are based on legality and institutional responsibility, the promotion of balanced and equitable development across their territories, and the efficient and effective use of public resources. They are also mandated to safeguard and improve the environment and to ensure meaningful and effective citizen participation in regional decision-making processes.

== Functions ==
Regional governments exercise a broad range of responsibilities aimed at promoting the comprehensive development of their territories. They design, implement, and coordinate regional development policies, plans, and programs, working in collaboration with municipalities and public services. They administer regional investment funds and programs, prepare and approve regional budget proposals, and allocate resources from the National Fund for Regional Development. Within their sphere of competence, they may issue regional regulations, provide technical support to municipalities in development planning, coordinate responses to emergencies and disasters, and participate in international cooperation initiatives in accordance with the law.

In matters of territorial planning, regional governments approve regional land-use planning instruments and promote infrastructure development while ensuring environmental protection. They coordinate regional transport systems, foster the development of rural and isolated areas, propose locations for regional public service offices, and identify disadvantaged territories that require targeted development programs.

In the economic sphere, regional governments promote productive development by formulating policies that support economic growth, innovation, investment, and competitiveness. They approve regional tourism development plans, promote scientific and technological research, and implement regional strategies related to science, technology, and innovation.

Regional governments also play a central role in social and cultural development. They establish priorities for poverty reduction, promote access to health, education, and social programs, and support vulnerable populations. In addition, they encourage cultural activities, protect regional heritage, strengthen regional identity, and promote sports development.

== Powers ==
To fulfill their functions, regional governments are empowered to approve regional regulations and development plans, administer regional assets and resources, and conclude investment agreements with public bodies. They supervise the execution of projects financed through regional budgets, approve territorial planning instruments, distribute subsidies associated with social programs, and authorize regional symbols such as flags and coats of arms.

== Structure ==
Each regional government is composed of two principal bodies. The regional governor serves as the executive authority responsible for administration and leadership, while the regional council functions as a collegiate body with normative, decision-making, and oversight responsibilities within the regional administration.

== List of regional governments ==
| Regional government | Governor | Party / Coalition | Regional council |
|---|---|---|---|
| Regional Government of Arica and Parinacota | Diego Paco Mamani | Renovación Nacional | Regional Council of Arica and Parinacota |
| Regional Government of Tarapacá | José Miguel Carvajal Gallardo | | Regional Council of Tarapacá |
| Regional Government of Antofagasta | Ricardo Díaz Cortés | Independent | Regional Council of Antofagasta |
| Regional Government of Atacama | Miguel Vargas Correa | Independent | Regional Council of Atacama |
| Regional Government of Coquimbo | Cristóbal Juliá de la Vega | Evolución Política | Regional Council of Coquimbo |
| Regional Government of Valparaíso | Rodrigo Mundaca Cabrera | | Regional Council of Valparaíso |
| Metropolitan Regional Government of Santiago | Claudio Orrego Larraín | Independent | Metropolitan Regional Council of Santiago |
| Regional Government of O'Higgins | Pablo Silva Amaya | Socialist Party of Chile | Regional Council of O'Higgins |
| Regional Government of Maule | Pedro Álvarez-Salamanca Ramírez | Independent Democratic Union | Regional Council of Maule |
| Regional Government of Ñuble | Óscar Crisóstomo Llanos | Socialist Party of Chile | Regional Council of Ñuble |
| Regional Government of Biobío | Sergio Giacaman García | Independent Democratic Union | Regional Council of Biobío |
| Regional Government of La Araucanía | René Saffirio | Independent | Regional Council of La Araucanía |
| Regional Government of Los Ríos | Luis Cuvertino Gómez | Socialist Party of Chile | Regional Council of Los Ríos |
| Regional Government of Los Lagos | Alejandro Santana | Renovación Nacional | Regional Council of Los Lagos |
| Regional Government of Aysén | Marcelo Santana Vargas | Independent Democratic Union | Regional Council of Aysén |
| Regional Government of Magallanes and Chilean Antarctica | Jorge Flies Añón | Radical Party of Chile | Regional Council of Magallanes and Chilean Antarctica |

== See also ==
- Regional councils of Chile
- Regions of Chile
- Municipalities of Chile
