= District 9 (Chamber of Deputies of Chile) =

Electoral district of the Chamber of Deputies of Chile

- Distrito 9
- Electoral District for the Chamber of Deputies
- Location of District 9 within Chile
- Commune: List: Cerro Navia; Conchalí; Huechuraba; Independencia; Lo Prado; Quinta Normal; Recoleta; Renca
- Region: Santiago
- Population: 969,806 (2017)
- Electorate: 831,421 (2021)
- Area: 132 km^{2} (2020)

Current Electoral District
- Created: 2017
- Seats: 7 (2017–present)
- Deputies: List: Boris Barrera (PC); Karol Cariola (PC); Jorge Durán (RN); Andrés Giordano (FA); José Carlos Meza (REP); Érika Olivera (D); Maite Orsini (FA)

District 9 (Spanish: Distrito 9) is one of the 28 multi-member electoral districts of the Chamber of Deputies, the lower house of the National Congress, the national legislature of Chile. The district was created by the 2015 electoral reform and came into being at the following general election in 2017. It consists of the communes of Cerro Navia, Conchalí, Huechuraba, Independencia, Lo Prado, Quinta Normal, Recoleta and Renca in the region of Santiago. The district currently elects seven of the 155 members of the Chamber of Deputies using the open party-list proportional representation electoral system. At the 2021 general election the district had 831,421 registered electors.

== Electoral system ==
District 9 currently elects seven of the 155 members of the Chamber of Deputies using the open party-list proportional representation electoral system. Parties may form electoral pacts with each other to pool their votes and increase their chances of winning seats. However, the number of candidates nominated by an electoral pact may not exceed the maximum number of candidates that a single party may nominate. Seats are allocated using the D'Hondt method.

== Election results ==
=== Summary ===
Election	Apruebo Dignidad AD / FA			Green Ecologists PEV			Dignidad Ahora DA			New Social Pact NPS / NM			Democratic Convergence CD			Chile Vamos Podemos / Vamos			Party of the People PDG			Christian Social Front FSC		
Election	Votes	%	Seats	Votes	%	Seats	Votes	%	Seats	Votes	%	Seats	Votes	%	Seats	Votes	%	Seats	Votes	%	Seats	Votes	%	Seats
2021	122,117	36.59%	4	23,932	7.17%	0	24,829	7.44%	0	20,415	6.12%	0				57,114	17.11%	2	23,362	7.00%	0	35,745	10.71%	1
2017	53,800	15.98%	1							105,826	31.42%	3	28,223	8.38%	0	117,406	34.86%	3						

=== Detailed ===
==== 2021 ====
Results of the 2021 general election held on 21 November 2021:

Party		Pact	Party											Pact		
Party		Pact	Votes per commune								Total votes	%	Seats	Votes	%	Seats
Party		Pact	Cerro Navia	Con- chalí	Hue- churaba	Indepen- dencia	Lo Prado	Quinta Normal	Reco- leta	Renca	Total votes	%	Seats	Votes	%	Seats
Communist Party of Chile	PC	Apruebo Dignidad	10,214	12,675	7,002	8,721	8,159	10,340	17,831	11,692	86,634	25.95%	2	122,117	36.59%	4
Democratic Revolution	RD	Apruebo Dignidad	2,734	3,044	2,699	1,962	2,553	2,997	3,314	2,690	21,993	6.59%	2	122,117	36.59%	4
Social Convergence	CS	Apruebo Dignidad	1,019	957	639	743	637	793	1,047	1,592	7,427	2.23%	0	122,117	36.59%	4
Comunes	COM	Apruebo Dignidad	1,855	614	404	301	700	904	598	687	6,063	1.82%	0	122,117	36.59%	4
National Renewal	RN	Chile Podemos +	6,079	5,087	4,615	3,630	4,162	5,972	5,876	3,902	39,323	11.78%	2	57,114	17.11%	2
Independent Democratic Union	UDI	Chile Podemos +	1,167	1,889	2,359	1,694	1,201	1,570	2,772	1,305	13,957	4.18%	0	57,114	17.11%	2
Democratic Independent Regionalist Party	PRI	Chile Podemos +	402	480	621	443	355	532	567	434	3,834	1.15%	0	57,114	17.11%	2
Republican Party	REP	Christian Social Front	3,706	4,942	5,005	4,239	3,448	4,183	6,022	4,200	35,745	10.71%	1	35,745	10.71%	1
Humanist Party	PH	Dignidad Ahora	2,563	2,861	1,615	1,313	2,216	2,163	2,596	3,034	18,361	5.50%	0	24,829	7.44%	0
Equality Party	IGUAL	Dignidad Ahora	1,025	883	535	566	738	783	909	1,029	6,468	1.94%	0	24,829	7.44%	0
Green Ecologist Party	PEV		3,016	3,813	3,095	1,813	2,640	2,737	3,627	3,191	23,932	7.17%	0	23,932	7.17%	0
Party of the People	PDG		3,533	3,437	2,175	1,522	2,754	2,487	3,410	4,044	23,362	7.00%	0	23,362	7.00%	0
Socialist Party of Chile	PS	New Social Pact	761	1,002	962	726	1,191	1,124	958	712	7,436	2.23%	0	20,415	6.12%	0
Christian Democratic Party	PDC	New Social Pact	543	848	696	493	610	800	1,010	874	5,874	1.76%	0	20,415	6.12%	0
Liberal Party of Chile	PL	New Social Pact	523	639	907	329	560	701	551	1,284	5,494	1.65%	0	20,415	6.12%	0
Party for Democracy	PPD	New Social Pact	198	251	172	103	201	222	260	204	1,611	0.48%	0	20,415	6.12%	0
United Centre	CU	United Independents	1,541	2,096	1,150	921	1,422	1,520	1,887	2,087	12,624	3.78%	0	12,624	3.78%	0
Patriotic Union	UPA		814	697	502	351	547	553	838	720	5,022	1.50%	0	5,022	1.50%	0
Progressive Party	PRO		767	662	415	323	592	639	658	835	4,891	1.47%	0	4,891	1.47%	0
Revolutionary Workers Party	PTR		668	550	297	256	456	391	549	568	3,735	1.12%	0	3,735	1.12%	0
Valid votes			43,128	47,427	35,865	30,449	35,142	41,411	55,280	45,084	333,786	100.00%	7	333,786	100.00%	7
Blank votes			2,952	2,882	2,251	1,588	2,572	2,170	3,249	2,884	20,548	5.47%				
Rejected votes – other			2,880	3,173	2,114	1,781	2,350	2,479	3,435	3,138	21,350	5.68%				
Total polled			48,960	53,482	40,230	33,818	40,064	46,060	61,964	51,106	375,684	45.19%				
Registered electors			113,693	116,290	74,581	82,526	86,901	101,182	140,460	115,788	831,421					
Turnout			43.06%	45.99%	53.94%	40.98%	46.10%	45.52%	44.12%	44.14%	45.19%					

The following candidates were elected: Boris Barrera (PC), 7,797 votes; Karol Cariola (PC), 78,837 votes; Jorge Durán (RN), 21,872 votes; Andrés Giordano (RD), 2,858 votes; José Carlos Meza (REP), 14,747 votes; Érika Olivera (RN), 13,801 votes; and Maite Orsini (RD), 19,135 votes.

==== 2017 ====
Results of the 2017 general election held on 19 November 2017:

Party		Pact	Party											Pact		
Party		Pact	Votes per commune								Total votes	%	Seats	Votes	%	Seats
Party		Pact	Cerro Navia	Con- chalí	Hue- churaba	Indepen- dencia	Lo Prado	Quinta Normal	Reco- leta	Renca	Total votes	%	Seats	Votes	%	Seats
National Renewal	RN	Chile Vamos	8,903	8,741	5,283	4,884	6,261	9,383	9,487	5,940	58,882	17.48%	2	117,406	34.86%	3
Evópoli	EVO	Chile Vamos	3,670	5,614	4,525	3,429	3,533	4,313	4,772	4,419	34,275	10.18%	1	117,406	34.86%	3
Independent Democratic Union	UDI	Chile Vamos	1,315	3,727	2,593	3,445	1,187	1,653	7,438	2,891	24,249	7.20%	0	117,406	34.86%	3
Communist Party of Chile	PC	Nueva Mayoría	5,152	8,047	5,105	6,091	3,326	5,383	15,477	6,217	54,798	16.27%	2	105,826	31.42%	3
Party for Democracy	PPD	Nueva Mayoría	9,107	3,059	2,178	934	9,300	3,860	1,934	2,530	32,902	9.77%	1	105,826	31.42%	3
Socialist Party of Chile	PS	Nueva Mayoría	1,743	2,144	1,413	4,003	1,066	3,959	1,661	2,137	18,126	5.38%	0	105,826	31.42%	3
Democratic Revolution	RD	Broad Front	3,105	3,991	2,928	2,358	2,959	3,431	4,176	2,997	25,945	7.70%	1	53,800	15.98%	1
Green Ecologist Party	PEV	Broad Front	1,111	1,279	735	737	976	1,151	1,271	1,827	9,087	2.70%	0	53,800	15.98%	1
Citizen Power	PODER	Broad Front	851	1,990	582	556	645	855	1,174	1,099	7,752	2.30%	0	53,800	15.98%	1
Humanist Party	PH	Broad Front	688	910	450	428	741	860	841	739	5,657	1.68%	0	53,800	15.98%	1
Equality Party	IGUAL	Broad Front	667	927	476	366	600	737	795	791	5,359	1.59%	0	53,800	15.98%	1
Christian Democratic Party	PDC	Democratic Convergence	2,975	3,989	2,430	1,411	3,698	2,934	3,268	7,518	28,223	8.38%	0	28,223	8.38%	0
Eddy Roldán Cabrera (Independent)	Ind		2,590	2,334	1,273	986	1,785	1,751	1,951	2,236	14,906	4.43%	0	14,906	4.43%	0
Progressive Party	PRO	All Over Chile	1,717	1,842	1,111	667	1,261	1,360	1,737	1,702	11,397	3.38%	0	11,397	3.38%	0
Patriotic Union	UPA		952	781	507	304	611	495	764	804	5,218	1.55%	0	5,218	1.55%	0
Valid votes			44,546	49,375	31,589	30,599	37,949	42,125	56,746	43,847	336,776	100.00%	7	336,776	100.00%	7
Blank votes			3,005	2,877	2,156	1,427	2,373	2,165	2,801	2,603	19,407	5.14%				
Rejected votes – other			3,133	3,418	1,917	1,835	2,787	2,606	3,124	2,770	21,590	5.72%				
Total polled			50,684	55,670	35,662	33,861	43,109	46,896	62,671	49,220	377,773	45.36%				
Registered electors			116,335	120,866	68,039	78,356	90,439	101,796	141,758	115,189	832,778					
Turnout			43.57%	46.06%	52.41%	43.21%	47.67%	46.07%	44.21%	42.73%	45.36%					

The following candidates were elected: Boris Barrera (PC), 4,352 votes; Karol Cariola (PC), 50,446 votes; Jorge Durán (RN), 19,421 votes; Cristina Girardi (PPD), 16,211 votes; Sebastián Keitel (EVO), 30,243 votes; Érika Olivera (RN), 30,817 votes; and Maite Orsini (RD), 21,814 votes.
