= Huechuraba =

Commune in Santiago, Chile

- Commune
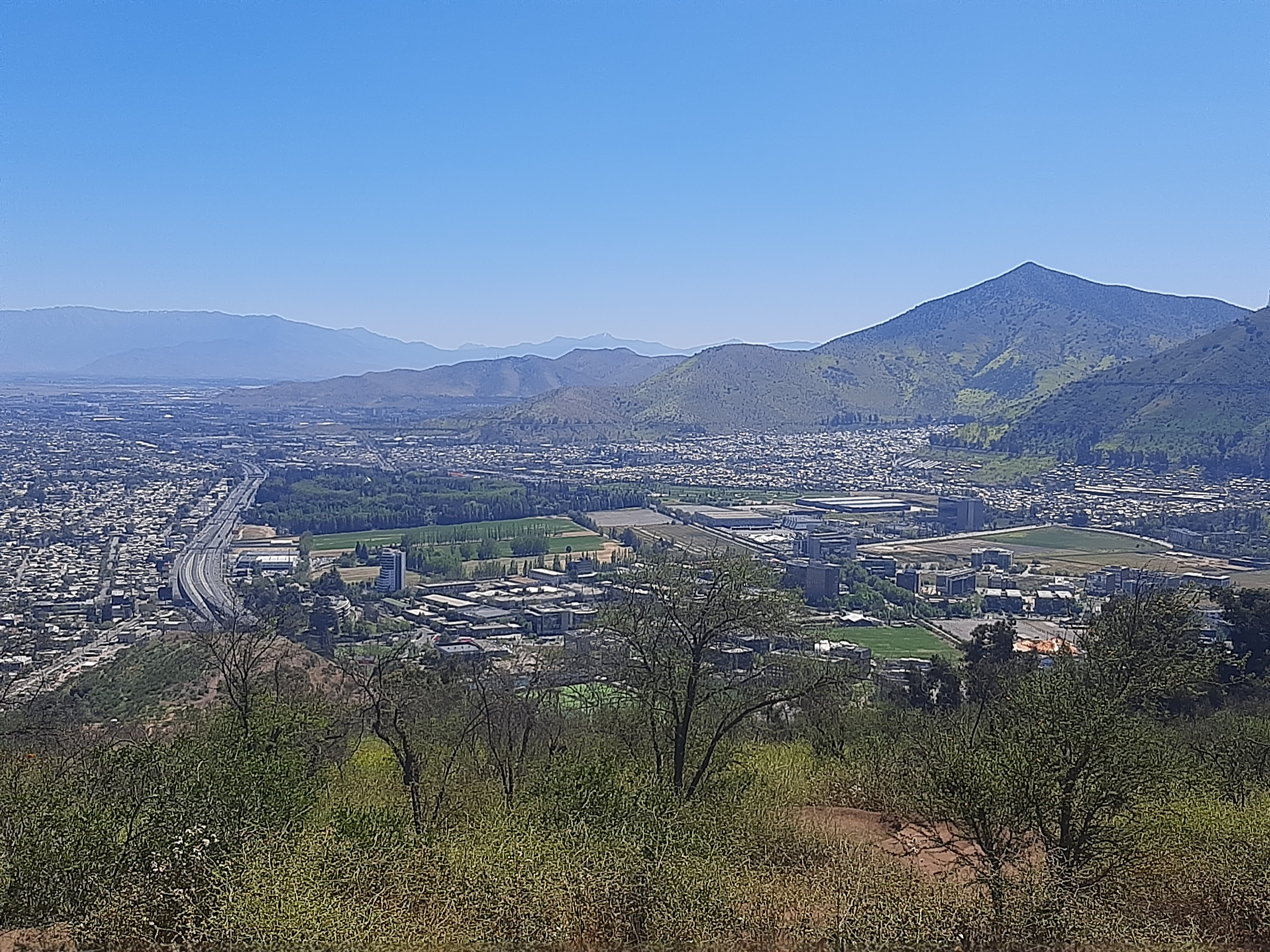
- Panoramic view from San Cristobal Hill

- Emblem Huechuraba within Greater Santiago Location in Chile
- Coordinates (city): 33°28′S 70°42′W
- Country: Chile
- Region: Santiago Metro.
- Province: Santiago
- Founded: March 1946

Government
  - Type: Municipality
  - Mayor: Maximiliano Luksic (Ind./UDI)

Area
  - Total: 44.8 km^{2} (17.3 sq mi)

Population (2024)
  - Total: 101,808
  - Density: 2,270/km^{2} (5,890/sq mi)
  - Urban: 101,715
  - Rural: 93
- Time zone: UTC-4 (CLT)
  - Summer (DST): UTC-3 (CLST)
- Area code: 56 +
- Website: Municipality of Huechuraba

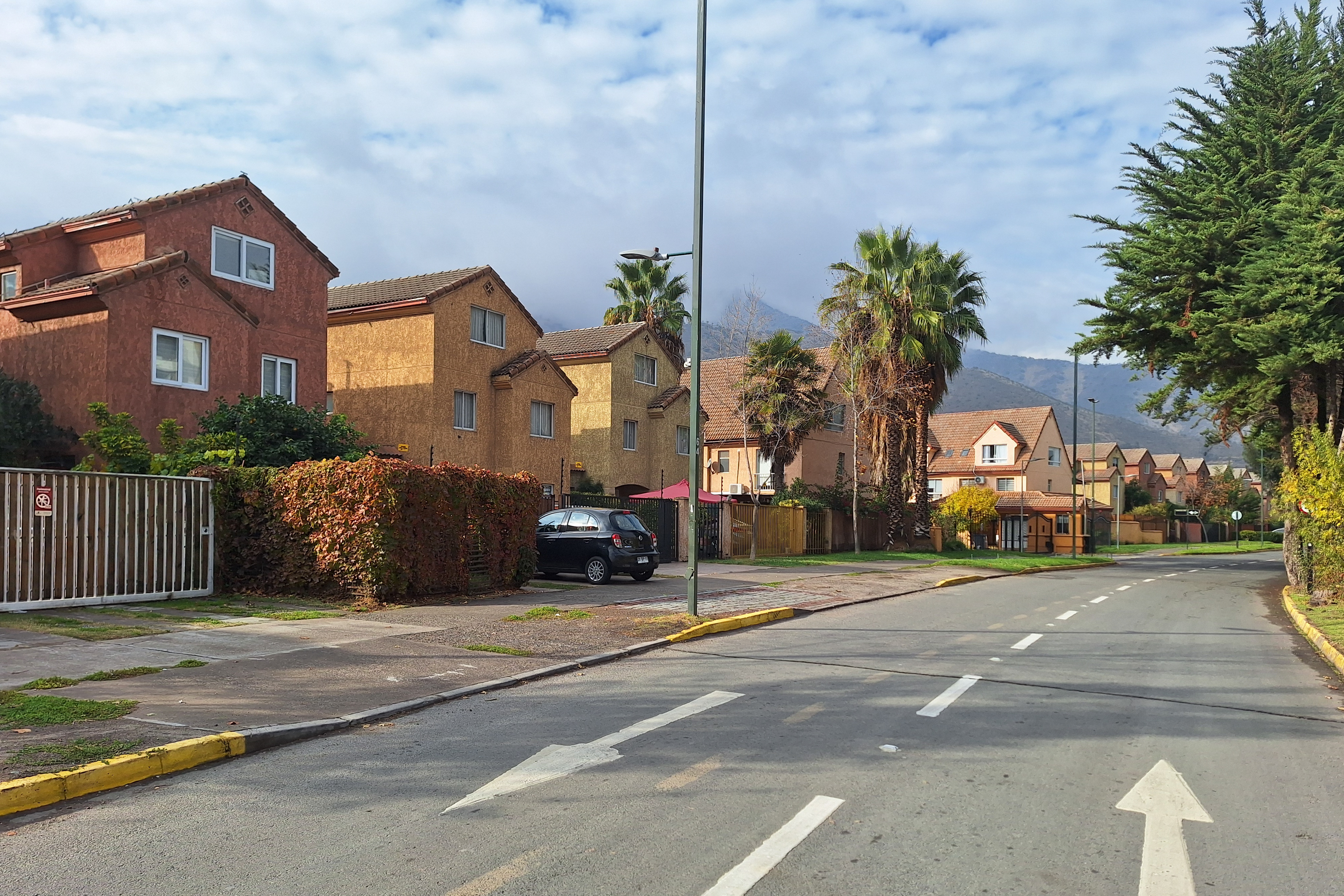
Western suburbs

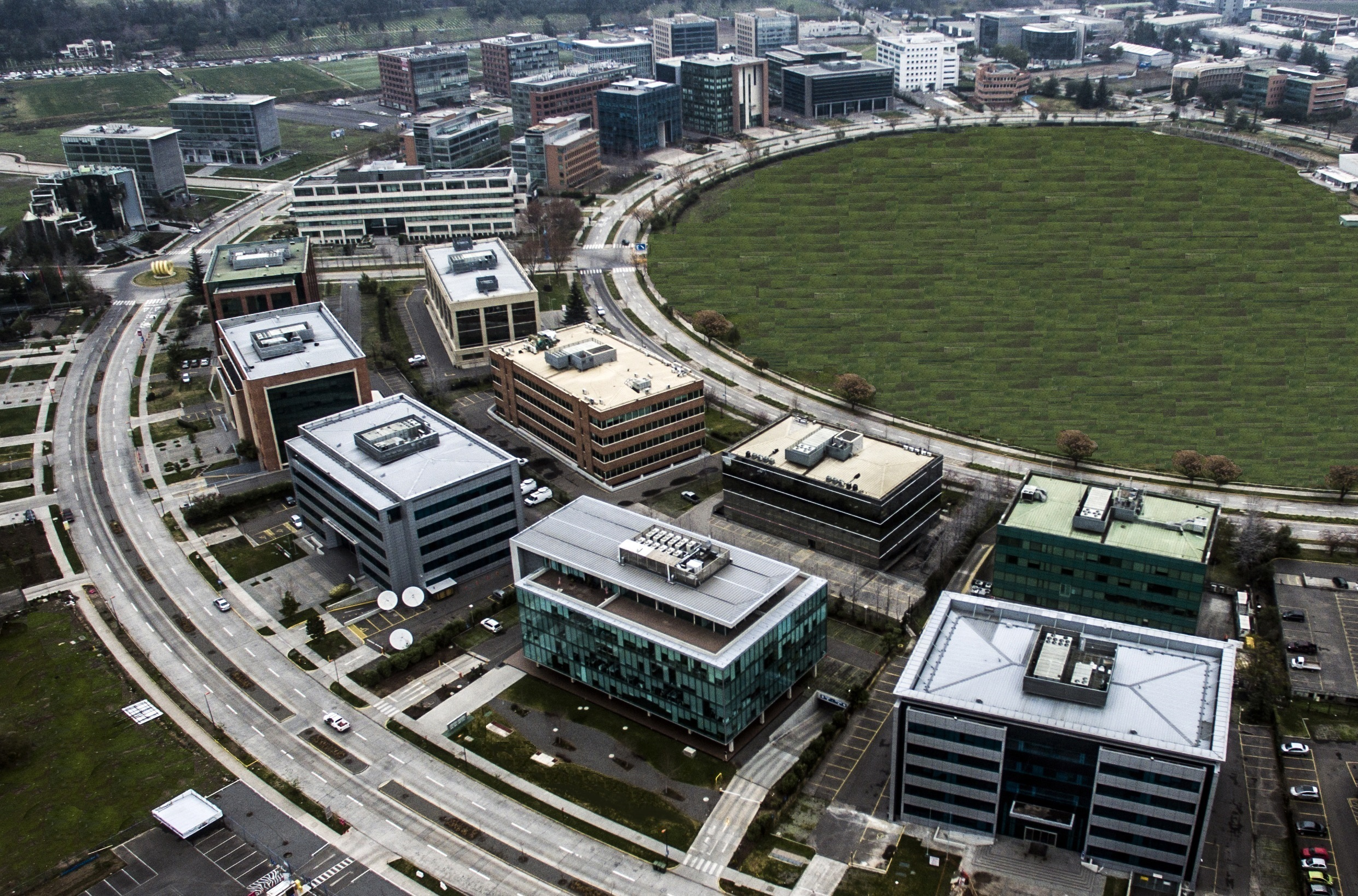
Ciudad empresarial

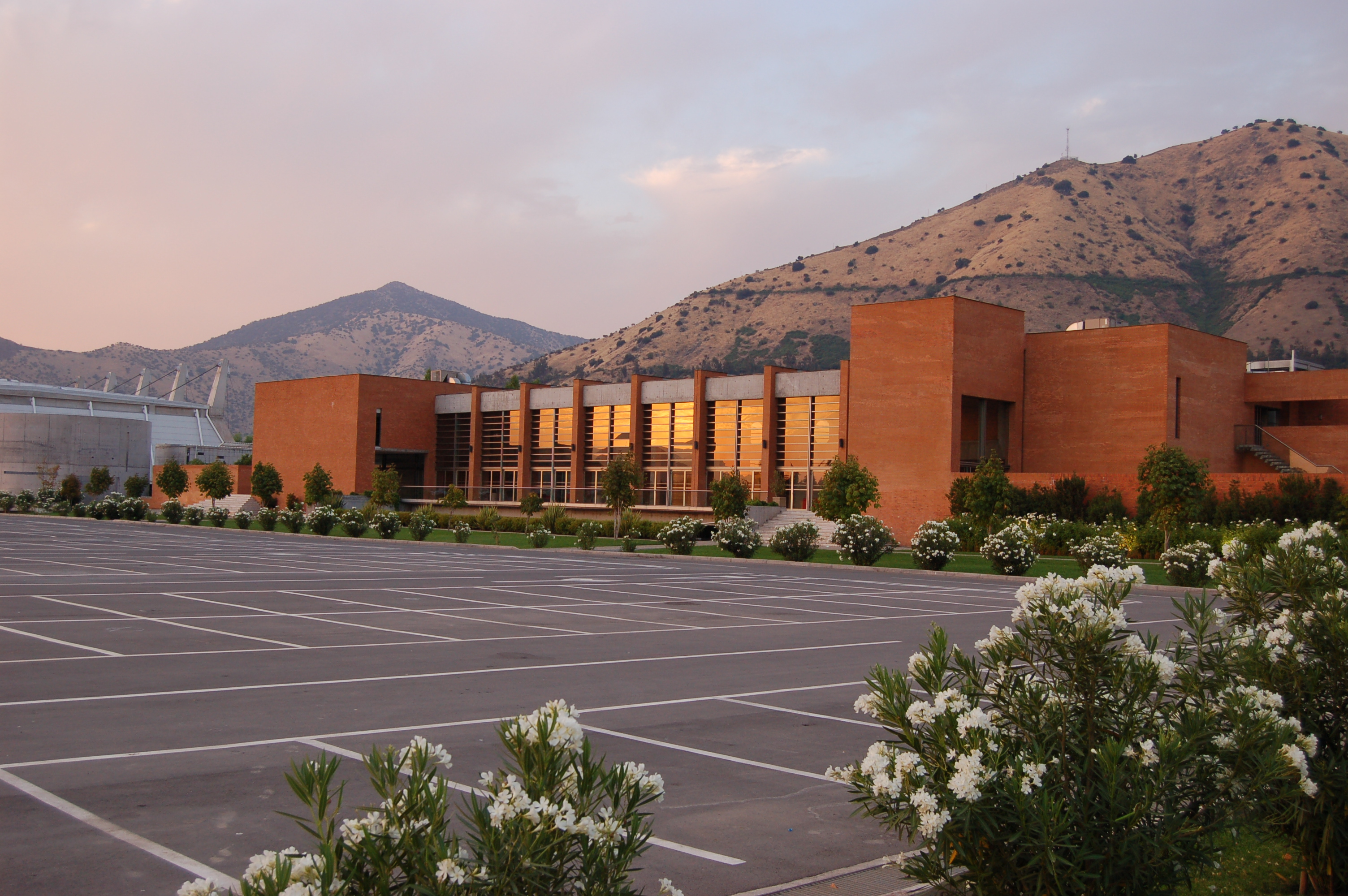
Espacio Riesco

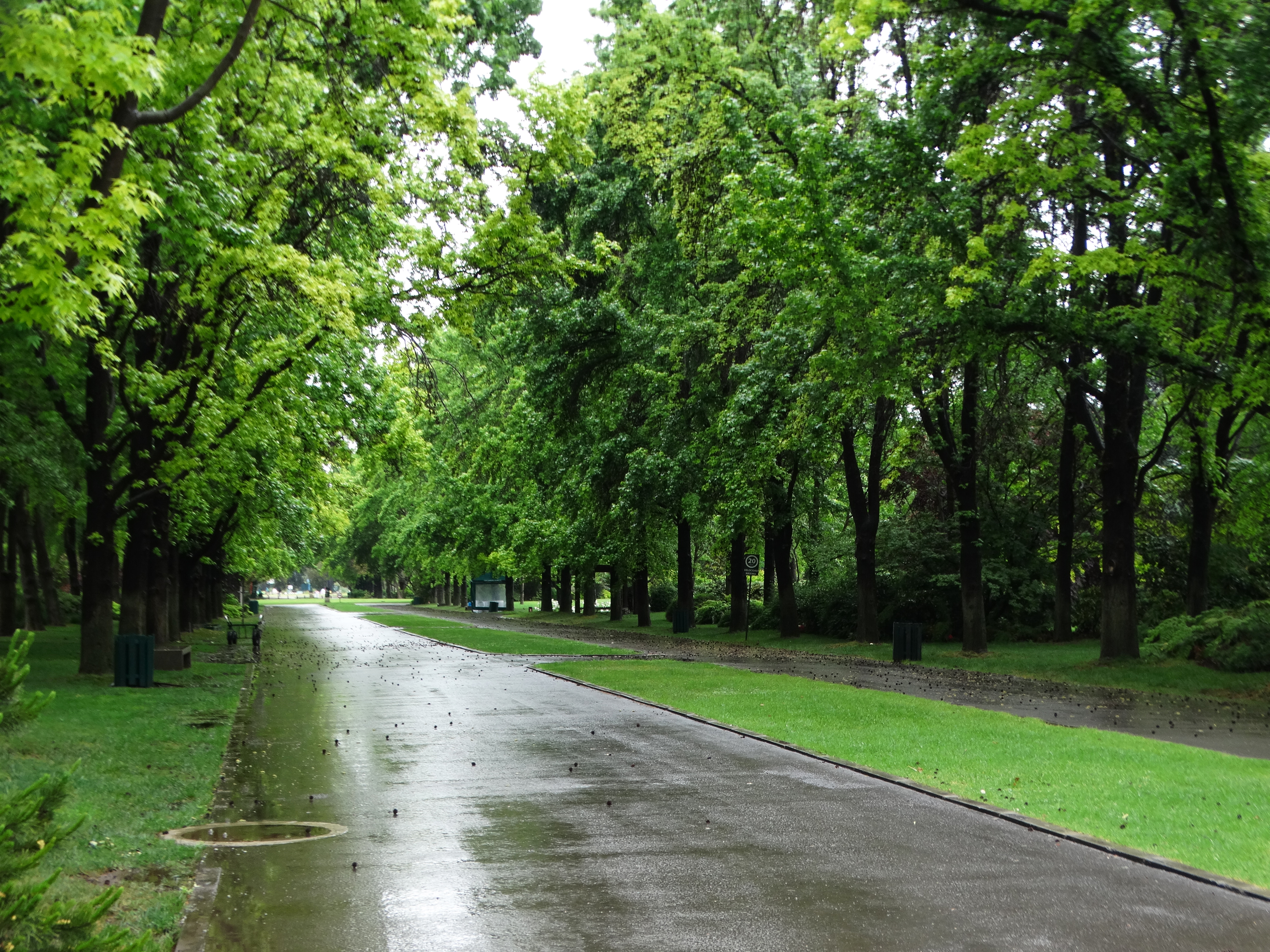
Parque del Recuerdo cementry

Huechuraba (Spanish pronunciation: [wetʃuˈɾaβa]) is a commune in Santiago Province in the Santiago Metropolitan Region in Chile. It has 101,808 inhabitants.

== Demographics ==
As of the 2024 census, the population is 101,808, of which 48.6% are male and 51.4% are female. People under 15 years old make up 19.1% of the population, and people over 65 years old make up 11.3%. 99.9% of the population is urban and 0.1% is rural.

Historical population
Year	Pop.	±% p.a.
1970	22,217	—
1982	56,313	+8.06%
1992	61,784	+0.93%
2002	74,070	+1.83%
2017	98,671	+1.93%
2024	101,808	+0.45%
Source: INE, Memoria Chilena

- Average annual household income: $52,904 (PPP, 2006)
- Population below poverty line: 14.5% (2006)
- Regional quality of life index: 73.23, medium, 31 out of 52 (2005)
- Human Development Index: 0.737, 56 out of 341 (2003)

=== Immigration ===
As of the 2024 census, immigrants make up 9.2% of the population - 8.1% are from South America, 0.7% from North America, 0.3% from Europe, 0.1% from Asia, 0.004% from Africa, and 0.01% from Oceania.

== Administration ==
As a commune, Huechuraba is a third-level administrative division of Chile administered by a municipal council, headed by a mayor who is elected by popular vote every four years. The 2024-2028 mayor is Maximiliano Luksic Lederer (Ind./UDI), while the communal council has the following members:

- Jorge Arancibia Labraña (REP)
- Fresia Hernández Bravo (FA)
- Bárbara Plaza Escobar (PCCh)
- Humberto Allendes Olivares (Evópoli)
- Elisa Kaelin Tello (Ind/PL)
- Fernando Pérez Navarro (RN)
- Genaro Román Zamorano (PPD)
- Javiera Jiménez Palomo (PS)

Within the electoral divisions of Chile, Huechuraba is represented in the Chamber of Deputies by Érika Olivera (RN), Jorge Durán Espinoza (RN), José Carlos Meza (REP), Andrés Giordano Salazar (FA), Karol Cariola (PC), Boris Barrera (PC) and Maite Orsini (RD), as part of the 9th electoral district, (together with Conchalí, Quinta Normal, Independencia, Recoleta, Lo Prado, Cerro Navia and Renca).
