= Regional Council of Los Ríos =

Regional council of Chile

Regional Council of the Los Ríos Region
- Consejo Regional de la Región de Los Ríos
- Coat of arms of the Los Ríos Region

Regional legislative body overview
- Formed: 2007
- Jurisdiction: Los Ríos Region, Chile
- Headquarters: Valdivia, Chile
- Minister responsible: Luis Cuvertino Gómez, Regional Governor (President of the Council)
- Parent Regional legislative body: Regional Government of Los Ríos

The Regional Council of Los Ríos Region (Spanish: Consejo Regional de la Región de Los Ríos), commonly known as CORE Los Ríos, is the regional council of the Los Ríos Region in Chile. It serves as the normative, decision-making, and oversight body within the Regional Government and is responsible for ensuring citizen participation in regional public administration and exercising the powers conferred upon it by the relevant organic constitutional law.

The council is composed of 14 regional councillors elected by popular vote for four-year terms, with the possibility of up to two re-elections. Territorial representation is organized into provincial constituencies, distributed in one constituency in Valdivia Province and one constituency in Ranco Province. Councillors serve four-year terms and may be re-elected. Until 2021, the council elected a president from among its members by absolute majority; following a constitutional reform enacted in 2020, the presidency of the regional council is held by law by the Regional Governor.

== Current Regional Council ==
The Regional Council of the Los Ríos Region for the 2025–2029 term is composed of the following councillors:

Constituency	Councillor	Party	Term
Valdivia	Ítalo Martínez Carvallo	Socialist Party of Chile	Since 11 March 2022
Valdivia	Juan Carlos Farías	Independent – Independent Democratic Union	Since 11 March 2018
Valdivia	Juan Taladriz Eguiluz	Evópoli	Since 11 March 2022
Valdivia	Héctor Pacheco Rivera	Christian Democratic Party (Chile)	Since 11 March 2018
Valdivia	Ariel Muñoz Morales	National Renewal	Since 11 March 2018
Valdivia	Sergio Valenzuela Irigoyen	Republican Party	Since 6 January 2025
Valdivia	Felipe López Palma	Socialist Party of Chile	Since 6 January 2025
Valdivia	Camila Mattar Hazbun	Broad Front	Since 6 January 2025
Valdivia	Mario Schmeisser Muñoz	National Renewal	Since 6 January 2025
Ranco	Catalina Hott Solís	Party for Democracy	Since 11 March 2018
Ranco	Sarita Jaramillo Arismendi	Party for Democracy	Since 11 March 2022
Ranco	Sebastián Gómez Pérez	Party for Democracy	Since 6 January 2025
Ranco	Marisol Bahamondez Millar	Independent Democratic Union	Since 6 January 2025
Ranco	Ane Contreras Álvarez	Republican Party	Since 6 January 2025
