= Regional Council of Los Lagos =

Regional council of Chile

Regional Council of Los Lagos Region
- Consejo Regional de la Región de Los Lagos
- Coat of arms of the Los Lagos Region

Regional legislative body overview
- Formed: 1993
- Jurisdiction: Los Lagos Region, Chile
- Headquarters: Puerto Montt, Chile
- Minister responsible: Alejandro Santana Tirachini , Regional Governor (President of the Council)
- Parent Regional legislative body: Regional Government of Los Lagos

The Regional Council of Los Lagos Region (Spanish: Consejo Regional de la Región de Los Lagos), commonly known as CORE Los Lagos, is the regional council of the Los Lagos Region in Chile. It serves as the normative, decision-making, and oversight body within the Regional Government and is responsible for ensuring citizen participation in regional public administration and exercising the powers conferred upon it by the relevant organic constitutional law.

The council is composed of 20 regional councillors elected by popular vote for four-year terms, with the possibility of up to two re-elections. Territorial representation is organized into provincial constituencies, distributed among Llanquihue Province, Osorno Province, Chiloé Province and Palena Province. Councillors serve four-year terms and may be re-elected. Until 2021, the council elected a president from among its members by absolute majority; following a constitutional reform enacted in 2020, the presidency of the regional council is held by law by the Regional Governor.

== Current Regional Council ==
The Regional Council of the Los Lagos Region for the 2025–2029 term is composed of the following councillors:

Constituency	Councillor	Party	Term
Llanquihue	Rodrigo Arismendi Valenzuela	Independent – Independent Democratic Union	Since 6 January 2025
Llanquihue	Tito Gómez Márquez	National Renewal	Since 6 January 2025
Llanquihue	César Negrón Barría	National Renewal	Since 11 March 2022
Llanquihue	Luis Hernández Soto	Republican Party	Since 6 January 2025
Llanquihue	Yasna Vásquez Vidal	Republican Party	Since 6 January 2025
Llanquihue	Patricia Gallardo Breuel	Christian Democratic Party (Chile)	Since 6 January 2025
Llanquihue	Luis Becerra Vargas	Independent – Socialist Party of Chile	Since 6 January 2025
Llanquihue	Marión Fernández Loncon	Broad Front	Since 6 January 2025
Osorno	Carlos Schwalm Urzúa	Independent – Independent Democratic Union	Since 6 January 2025
Osorno	Augusto Eguiluz Loyola	Republican Party	Since 6 January 2025
Osorno	Eduardo Parada Silva	Republican Party	Since 6 January 2025
Osorno	Francisco Reyes Castro	Socialist Party of Chile	Since 11 March 2018
Osorno	Bernardo Barría Angulo	Christian Democratic Party (Chile)	Since 6 January 2025
Osorno	Alexis Casanova Cárdenas	National Renewal	Since 11 March 2018
Chiloé	Freddy Gallardo Pacheco	Independent – Independent Democratic Union	Since 6 January 2025
Chiloé	Francisco Cárcamo Hernández	National Renewal	Since 11 March 2022
Chiloé	Javier Cabello Stom	Independent – Socialist Party of Chile	Since 6 January 2025
Chiloé	Nelson Águila Serpa	Christian Democratic Party (Chile)	Since 11 March 2018
Palena	Félix Vargas Cotiart	National Renewal	Since 6 January 2025
Palena	Catalina Saavedra Gómez	Broad Front	Since 6 January 2025
