= Regional Council of Coquimbo =

- Consejo Regional de la Región de Coquimbo
- Coat of arms of the Coquimbo Region

Regional legislative body overview
- Formed: 1993
- Preceding Regional legislative body: Regional Development Council of the IV Region
- Jurisdiction: Coquimbo Region, Chile
- Headquarters: La Serena, Chile
- Minister responsible: Cristóbal Juliá de la Vega, Regional Governor (President of the Council)
- Parent Regional legislative body: Regional Government of Coquimbo

The Regional Council of the Coquimbo Region (Spanish: Consejo Regional de la Región de Coquimbo), commonly known as CORE Coquimbo, is the regional council of the Coquimbo Region in Chile. It serves as the normative, decision-making, and oversight body within the scope of the Regional Government of Coquimbo and is responsible for ensuring citizen participation at the regional level and exercising the powers conferred upon it by the relevant organic constitutional law. Its headquarters are located in the city of La Serena.

The council is composed of 16 councillors elected by direct universal suffrage from the region's three provinces: 8 from Elqui Province, 4 from Limarí Province, and 4 from Choapa Province. Councillors serve four-year terms and may be re-elected for a maximum of two additional terms. Until 2021, the council elected a president from among its members by absolute majority; following a constitutional reform enacted in 2020, the presidency of the regional council is held by law by the Regional Governor.

== Current Regional Council ==
The Regional Council for the 2025–2029 term is composed of:

Province	Councillor	Party	Term
Elqui	Valeria Chacana Alarcón	Communist Party	Since 6 January 2025
Elqui	Paola Cortés Vega	Independent Democratic Union	Since 11 March 2018
Elqui	Lombardo Toloza Escorza	Christian Democratic Party	Since 11 March 2018
Elqui	Francisco Corral Macías	Republican Party	Since 6 January 2025
Elqui	María Concha Wagenknecht	National Renewal	Since 11 March 2014
Elqui	Belén Auger Julien	Republican Party	Since 6 January 2025
Elqui	Pedro Valencia Cortés	Socialist Party	Since 11 March 2022
Elqui	Ximena Ampuero García	Broad Front	Since 11 March 2018
Limarí	Max Aguirre Rojas	National Renewal	Since 6 January 2025
Limarí	Carlos Romo García	Socialist Party	Since 6 January 2025
Limarí	Bernardo Chávez Araya	Republican Party	Since 6 January 2025
Limarí	Tatiana Cortés Segovia	Communist Party	Since 11 March 2022
Choapa	Eduardo Ibacache Olivares	Christian Democratic Party	Since 11 March 2022
Choapa	Juan Hisi Espinoza	Independent – Christian Democratic Party	Since 6 January 2025
Choapa	Ángel González Aguilera	Independent – National Renewal	Since 11 March 2022
Choapa	Juan Barraza Astorga	Party for Democracy	Since 11 March 2022
