= Regional Council of Biobío =

Regional Council of the Biobío Region
- Consejo Regional de la Región del Biobío
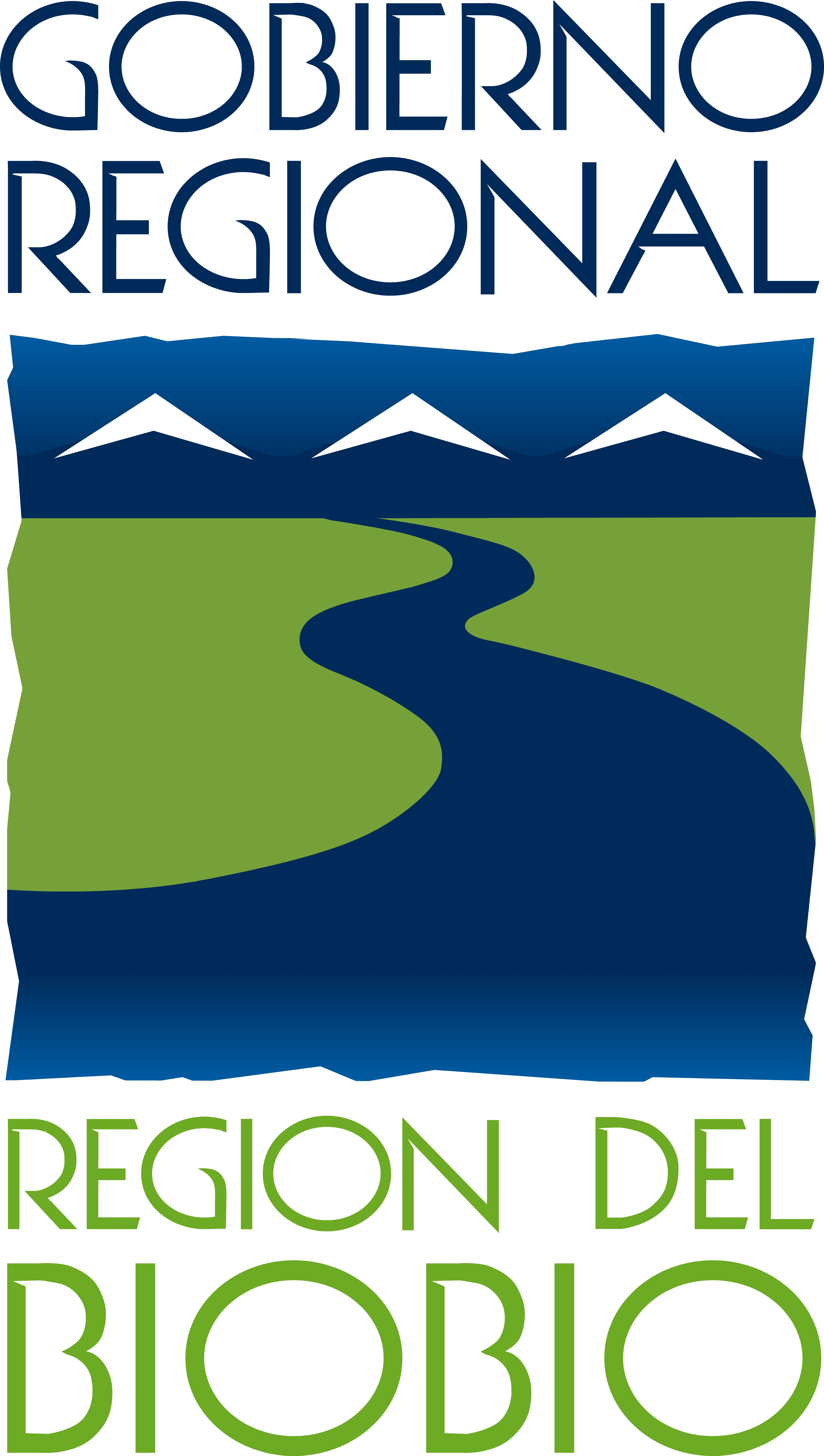
- Coat of arms of the Biobío Region

Regional legislative body overview
- Formed: 1993
- Jurisdiction: Biobío Region, Chile
- Headquarters: Concepción, Chile
- Minister responsible: Sergio Giacaman García, Regional Governor (President of the Council)
- Parent Regional legislative body: Regional Government of Biobío

The Regional Council of the Biobío Region (Spanish: Consejo Regional de la Región del Biobío), commonly known as CORE Biobío, is the regional council of the Biobío Region in Chile. It serves as the normative, decision-making, and oversight body within the Regional Government and is responsible for ensuring citizen participation in regional public administration and exercising the powers conferred upon it by the relevant organic constitutional law.

The council is composed of 28 regional councillors elected by popular vote for four-year terms, with the possibility of up to two re-elections. Territorial representation is organized into provincial constituencies, distributed in three constituencies in Concepción Province, one constituency in Biobío Province and one constituency in Arauco Province. Councillors serve four-year terms and may be re-elected. Until 2021, the council elected a president from among its members by absolute majority; following a constitutional reform enacted in 2020, the presidency of the regional council is held by law by the Regional Governor.

== Current Regional Council ==
The Regional Council of the Biobío Region for the 2025–2029 term is composed of the following councillors:

Constituency	Councillor	Party	Term
Concepción I (North)	Christian Arellano Vera	Republican Party	Since 6 January 2025
Concepción I (North)	Jaime Peñailillo Garrido	Independent – Socialist Party of Chile	Since 6 January 2025
Concepción I (North)	Larry Sandoval Lara	Independent Democratic Union	Since 6 January 2025
Concepción I (North)	Luis Santibáñez Bastidas	Republican Party	Since 6 January 2025
Concepción I (North)	Marcelo Rivera Arancibia	Radical Party of Chile	Since 6 January 2025
Concepción I (North)	Pedro Seguel Monsalve	Social Christian Party (Chile, 2022)	Since 6 January 2025
Concepción II (Centre)	Alan Bastías Urrutia	Democrats (Chile)	Since 6 January 2025
Concepción II (Centre)	Claudio Lapostol Vargas	Republican Party	Since 6 January 2025
Concepción II (Centre)	Patricio Kuhn Artigues	Independent Democratic Union	Since 6 January 2025
Concepción II (Centre)	Pedro Venegas Castro	Christian Democratic Party (Chile)	Since 6 January 2025
Concepción II (Centre)	Yanina Contreras Álvarez	Social Christian Party (Chile, 2022)	Since 11 March 2022
Concepción II (Centre)	Yasna Jaramillo Riquelme	Republican Party	Since 6 January 2025
Concepción III (South)	Américo Mondaca Daza	Republican Party	Since 6 January 2025
Concepción III (South)	Andrés Arroyo Muñoz	Social Christian Party (Chile, 2022)	Since 6 January 2025
Concepción III (South)	Anselmo Peña Rodríguez	Renovación Nacional	Since 6 January 2025
Concepción III (South)	Francisco Reyes Aguayo	Party for Democracy	Since 6 January 2025
Concepción III (South)	Gonzalo Osorio Rioseco	Broad Front (Chile)	Since 6 January 2025
Concepción III (South)	Tamara Concha Cabrera	Communist Party of Chile	Since 6 January 2025
Biobío	Ignacio Fica Espinoza	Renovación Nacional	Since 6 January 2025
Biobío	Juan Carlos Villanueva Cabas	Christian Democratic Party (Chile)	Since 6 January 2025
Biobío	Juan Medina Martínez	Independent – Radical Party of Chile	Since 6 January 2025
Biobío	María Núñez Ramírez	Republican Party	Since 6 January 2025
Biobío	Robert Córdova Bustos	Independent – Socialist Party of Chile	Since 11 March 2022
Biobío	Enrique Krause Lobos	Independent Democratic Union	Since 6 January 2025
Arauco	Angelo Millamán López	Republican Party	Since 6 January 2025
Arauco	Christopher Gengnagel Carrasco	Renovación Nacional	Since 11 March 2018
Arauco	Cristian Medina Cea	Independent – Independent Democratic Union	Since 6 January 2025
Arauco	Leonidas Peña Henríquez	Communist Party of Chile	Since 11 March 2022
