= Regional Council of O'Higgins =

- Consejo Regional de la Región del Libertador General Bernardo O'Higgins
- Coat of arms of the O'Higgins Region

Regional legislative body overview
- Formed: 1993
- Preceding Regional legislative body: Regional Development Council of the VI Region
- Jurisdiction: O'Higgins Region, Chile
- Headquarters: Rancagua, Chile
- Minister responsible: Pablo Silva Amaya, Regional Governor (President of the Council)
- Parent Regional legislative body: Regional Government of O'Higgins

The Regional Council of the Libertador General Bernardo O'Higgins Region (Spanish: Consejo Regional de la Región del Libertador General Bernardo O'Higgins), commonly known as CORE O'Higgins, is the regional council of the O'Higgins Region in Chile. It serves as the normative, decision-making, and oversight body within the scope of the Regional Government of O'Higgins and is responsible for ensuring citizen participation at the regional level and exercising the powers conferred upon it by the relevant organic constitutional law. Its headquarters are located in the city of Rancagua.

The council is composed of 20 councillors elected by direct universal suffrage from the region's three provinces: 13 from Cachapoal Province, 5 from Colchagua Province, and 2 from Cardenal Caro Province. Councillors serve four-year terms and may be re-elected. Until 2021, the council elected a president from among its members by absolute majority; following a constitutional reform enacted in 2020, the presidency of the regional council is held by law by the Regional Governor.

== Current Regional Council ==
The Regional Council for the 2025–2029 term is composed of:

Province	Councilor	Party	Term
Cachapoal I	Carlos Schmincke Martínez	PRCh	Since 6 January 2025
Cachapoal I	Germán Arenas Sáez	FA	Since 11 March 2018
Cachapoal I	Juan Carlos Mackay Jarpa	PRCh	Since 6 January 2025
Cachapoal I	Mauricio Valderrama Álvarez	PS	Since 11 March 2022
Cachapoal I	Pedro Hernández Garrido	UDI	Since 11 March 2022
Cachapoal II	Álex Ramírez Ortíz	PPD	Since 11 March 2022
Cachapoal II	Deysi Navarro Padilla	Ind.- UDI	Since 6 January 2025
Cachapoal II	Jacqueline Jorquera Reinoso	PS	Since 11 March 2018
Cachapoal II	Lucía Muñoz Sandoval	RN	Since 6 January 2025
Cachapoal II	Manuel Morales Burgos	PRCh	Since 6 January 2025
Cachapoal II	Miguel Ángel Riveros Landaeta	PDC	Since 6 January 2025
Cachapoal II	Pedro Bustamante Donoso	PRCh	Since 6 January 2025
Cachapoal II	Rosa Zacconi Quiroz	Demócratas	Since 6 January 2025
Colchagua	Alejandro Díaz Correa	Ind.- FREVS	Since 6 January 2025
Colchagua	Edgardo Vargas Bolbarán	PRCh	Since 6 January 2025
Colchagua	Gerardo Contreras Jorquera	RN	Since 11 March 2018
Colchagua	María Margarita Henríquez González	PS	Since 6 January 2025
Colchagua	Sebastián Rocha Medina	UDI	Since 6 January 2025
Cardenal Caro	Jorge Vargas González	UDI	Since 11 March 2018
Cardenal Caro	José Ignacio González Pino	UDI	Since 6 January 2025
