= Regional Council of Maule =

Regional Council of the Maule Region
- Consejo Regional de la Región del Maule
- Coat of arms of the Maule Region

Regional legislative body overview
- Formed: 1993
- Jurisdiction: Maule Region, Chile
- Headquarters: Talca, Chile
- Minister responsible: Pedro Álvarez-Salamanca Ramírez, Regional Governor (President of the Council)
- Parent Regional legislative body: Regional Government of Maule

The Regional Council of the Maule Region (Spanish: Consejo Regional de la Región del Maule), commonly known as CORE Maule, is the regional council of the Maule Region in Chile. It serves as the normative, decision-making, and oversight body within the scope of the Regional Government of Maule and is responsible for ensuring citizen participation at the regional level and exercising the powers conferred upon it by law.

The council is composed of 20 regional councillors elected by popular vote for four-year terms, with the possibility of re-election for a maximum of two additional terms. Territorial representation is distributed among the region’s four provinces: seven from Talca Province, six from Curicó Province, five from Linares Province, and two from Cauquenes Province.

Regional councillors are elected through an open list proportional representation system using the D'Hondt method. The council is presided over by the Regional Governor.

== Current Regional Council ==
The Regional Council for the 2025–2029 term is composed of:

Province	Councillor	Party	Term
Curicó	Dominique Schlack Silva	Republican Party	Since 6 January 2025
Curicó	Gaby Fuentes Yáñez	Renovación Nacional	Since 11 March 2022
Curicó	Román Pavez López	Independent – Radical Party of Chile	Since 11 March 2022
Curicó	Igor Villarreal Guajardo	Broad Front (Chile)	Since 6 January 2025
Curicó	Mirtha Segura Ovalle	Independent Democratic Union	Since 11 March 2018
Curicó	Roberto García Parra	Christian Democratic Party (Chile)	Since 11 March 2022
Talca	Silvio del Río Jiménez	Radical Party of Chile	Since 6 January 2025
Talca	Paola Guajardo Oyarce	Renovación Nacional	Since 11 March 2022
Talca	Gonzalo Montero Viceros	Renovación Nacional	Since 6 January 2025
Talca	Raphael Zúñiga Mendoza	Independent Democratic Union	Since 6 January 2025
Talca	Patricio Domínguez Ibarra	Christian Democratic Party (Chile)	Since 6 January 2025
Talca	Sergio Aguiló Melo	Socialist Party of Chile	Since 6 January 2025
Talca	Rossana García Chevecich	Republican Party	Since 6 January 2025
Linares	Pablo Gutiérrez Pareja	Independent – Party for Democracy	Since 11 March 2022
Linares	Ismael Fuentes Castro	Independent – Independent Democratic Union	Since 6 January 2025
Linares	Almiro Garrido Cáceres	Independent Democratic Union	Since 6 January 2025
Linares	Cecilia Parham Mucarquer	Renovación Nacional	Since 11 March 2018
Linares	Francisco Durán Ramírez	Renovación Nacional	Since 6 January 2025
Cauquenes	Juan Andrés Muñoz Saavedra	Renovación Nacional	Since 11 March 2018
Cauquenes	Francisco Ruíz Muñoz	Republican Party	Since 6 January 2025
