= Regional Council of Atacama =

Regional Council of Atacama Region Consejo Regional de la Región de Atacama

Type
- Type: Regional council of the Regional Government of Atacama of Atacama Region

History
- Founded: 1993

Leadership
- President of the Regional Council: Miguel Vargas Correa since 2021

Structure
- Seats: 14 regional councillors
- Political groups: Chile Vamos (5): RN UDI Apruebo Dignidad (6): PCCh FREVS Democratic Socialism (3): PS Independent
- Length of term: 4 years

Elections
- Voting system: Proportional representation
- Last election: 26-27 October 2024

Meeting place
- Gregorio Cordovez 260, La Serena, Chile

Website
- goreatacama.gob.cl/consejeros-2/

The Regional Council of Atacama is the normative, decision-making, and oversight body of the Atacama Region within the framework of Chile’s regional administration. It ensures regional citizen participation and exercises the powers assigned to it by law.

The council is composed of 14 councillors elected by direct universal suffrage from the region's three provinces: 3 from Chañaral, 7 from Copiapó, and 4 from Huasco. Councillors serve four-year terms and may be re-elected. Until 2021, the council elected a president from among its members by absolute majority; following a constitutional reform enacted in 2020, the presidency of the regional council is held by law by the Regional Governor.

== Regional councillors ==
=== 2025-2029 ===
The Regional Council for the 2025–2029 term is composed of the following regional councilors:

Province	Councilor	Party	Term
Copiapó	Patricio Alfaro Morales	FREVS	Since 11 March 2018
Copiapó	Francisco Cortéz Pallauta	FREVS	Since 6 January 2025
Copiapó	Felipe Fuentes Zumaran	Ind.- PCCh	Since 6 January 2025
Copiapó	Fernando Ghiglino Pizarro	RN	Since 6 January 2025
Copiapó	Emilio Bianchi Cañas	Ind.- RN	Since 6 January 2025
Copiapó	Hugo Bugueño Rojas	Ind.- PPD	Since 6 January 2025
Copiapó	Yerko Ravlic Elal	FA	Since 6 January 2025
Copiapó	Miguel San Martín Salgado	PRCh	Since 6 January 2025
Huasco	Juan Santana Álvarez	PS	Since 11 March 2018
Huasco	Igor Verdugo Herrera	PS	Since 11 March 2022
Huasco	Jorge Torres Torres	Ind.- RN	Since 6 January 2025
Huasco	Fabiola Pérez Tapia	FREVS	Since 11 March 2018
Chañaral	Manuel Reyes Cuello	PCCh	Since 6 January 2025
Chañaral	Freddy Rubina Aracena	Ind.- RN	Since 6 January 2025

=== 2018–2022 ===
- Chañaral Province
  - Mario Araya Rojas (RN), replaced by Alex Ahumada Monroy (RN) in October 2019
  - Héctor Antonio Volta Rojas (PRSD), replaced by Manuel Reyes Cuello (PCCh) in October 2019
  - Gabriel Armando Mánquez Vicencio (PCCh)
- Copiapó Province
  - Patricia González Brizuela (UDI)
  - Fernando Alfonso Ghiglino Pizarro (RN)
  - Sergio Bordoli Vergara (RN)
  - Rodrigo Antonio Rojas Tapia (Independent, PCCh)
  - Patricio Alfaro Morales (Independent, FREVS)
  - Ruth Vega Donoso (PS)
  - Javier Aníbal Castillo Julio (PCCh)
- Huasco Province
  - Roberto Alegría Olivares (RN)
  - Fabiola del Carmen Pérez Tapia (Independent)
  - Rebeca Torrejón Sierra (FREVS)
  - Juan Horacio Santana Álvarez (Independent, PS)
