= Regional Council of Antofagasta =

- Consejo Regional de la Región de Antofagasta

Regional legislative body overview
- Formed: 1993
- Preceding Regional legislative body: Regional Development Council of the II Region
- Jurisdiction: Antofagasta Region, Chile
- Headquarters: Antofagasta, Chile
- Minister responsible: Ricardo Díaz Cortés, Regional Governor (President of the Council)
- Parent Regional legislative body: Regional Government of Antofagasta

The Regional Council of the Antofagasta Region (Spanish: Consejo Regional de la Región de Antofagasta), commonly known as CORE Antofagasta, is the regional council of the Antofagasta Region in Chile. It serves as the normative, decision-making, and oversight body within the scope of the Regional Government of Antofagasta and is responsible for ensuring citizen participation at the regional level and exercising the powers conferred upon it by the relevant organic constitutional law. Its headquarters are located in the city of Antofagasta.

The council is composed of 16 councillors elected by direct universal suffrage from the region's three provinces: 8 from Antofagasta Province, 5 from El Loa Province, and 3 from Tocopilla Province. Councillors serve four-year terms and may be re-elected for a maximum of two additional terms. Until 2021, the council elected a president from among its members by absolute majority; following a constitutional reform enacted in 2020, the presidency of the regional council is held by law by the Regional Governor.

== Current Regional Council ==
The Regional Council for the 2025–2029 term is composed of:

Province	Councillor	Party	Term
Antofagasta	Alejandro Cifuentes Mancilla	Republican Party	Since 6 January 2025
Antofagasta	Duzanka Flores Rojas	Social Christian Party	Since 6 January 2025
Antofagasta	Andrea Merino Díaz	Socialist Party	Since 6 January 2025
Antofagasta	Paula Celis Sierralta	Party of the People	Since 11 March 2022
Antofagasta	Gonzalo Santolaya Goicovic	Independent Democratic Union	Since 6 January 2025
Antofagasta	Paula Orellana Uribe	Broad Front	Since 11 March 2022
Antofagasta	Yasna Meneses González	Republican Party	Since 6 January 2025
Antofagasta	Víctor Guzmán Rojas	Communist Party	Since 11 March 2022
El Loa	Sandra Berna Martínez	Christian Democratic Party	Since 11 March 2018
El Loa	Emilio Mavrakis Assad	Republican Party	Since 6 January 2025
El Loa	Jorge Berna Mendoza	Party of the People	Since 6 January 2025
El Loa	Dinka López Durán	FRVS	Since 6 January 2025
El Loa	Luis Payero Cruz	Socialist Party	Since 6 January 2025
Tocopilla	Humberto Fuentes Lagos	Independent – FRVS	Since 6 January 2025
Tocopilla	Gustavo Carrasco Ortiz	Party for Democracy	Since 11 March 2022
Tocopilla	Patricio Tapia Julio	Christian Democratic Party	Since 11 January 2025
