= Regional Council of La Araucanía =

Regional Council of La Araucanía Region
- Consejo Regional de la Región de La Araucanía
- Coat of arms of the Araucanía Region

Regional legislative body overview
- Formed: 1993
- Jurisdiction: Araucanía Region, Chile
- Headquarters: Temuco, Chile
- Minister responsible: René Saffirio Espinoza, Regional Governor (President of the Council)
- Parent Regional legislative body: Regional Government of Araucanía

The Regional Council of La Araucanía Region (Spanish: Consejo Regional de la Región de La Araucanía), commonly known as CORE Araucanía, is the regional council of the Araucanía Region in Chile. It serves as the normative, decision-making, and oversight body within the Regional Government and is responsible for ensuring citizen participation in regional public administration and exercising the powers conferred upon it by the relevant organic constitutional law.

The council is composed of 20 regional councillors elected by popular vote for four-year terms, with the possibility of up to two re-elections. Territorial representation is organized into provincial constituencies, distributed in two constituencies in Cautín Province and one constituency in Malleco Province. Councillors serve four-year terms and may be re-elected. Until 2021, the council elected a president from among its members by absolute majority; following a constitutional reform enacted in 2020, the presidency of the regional council is held by law by the Regional Governor.

== Current Regional Council ==
The Regional Council of the Araucanía Region for the 2025–2029 term is composed of the following councillors:

Constituency	Councillor	Party	Term
Cautín I	Sara Suazo Suazo	Renovación Nacional	Since 6 January 2025
Cautín I	Víctor Yáñez Arancibia	Republican Party	Since 6 January 2025
Cautín I	Patricia Paillao Millán	Broad Front (Chile)	Since 6 January 2025
Cautín I	Miguel Ángel Contreras Maldonado	Independent	Since 11 March 2018
Cautín I	Ana María Soto Cea	Party for Democracy	Since 11 March 2018
Cautín I	Hans Van der Molen Mora	Renovación Nacional	Since 6 January 2025
Cautín I	Roberto Paredes Sandoval	Christian Democratic Party (Chile)	Since 6 January 2025
Cautín II	Eduardo Hernández Schmidt	Renovación Nacional	Since 11 March 2018
Cautín II	Gilda Mendoza Vásquez	Renovación Nacional	Since 11 March 2018
Cautín II	Mauricio Devaud Morales	Independent – Party for Democracy	Since 6 January 2025
Cautín II	Rodrigo Pacheco Aguilera	Independent Democratic Union	Since 6 January 2025
Cautín II	José Lizama Díaz	Independent Democratic Union	Since 6 January 2025
Cautín II	Marisol Wickel Navarrete	Republican Party	Since 6 January 2025
Cautín II	Julio Marileo Calfuqueo	Independent – Broad Front (Chile)	Since 6 January 2025
Cautín II	Cristián Herrera González	Democrats (Chile)	Since 6 January 2025
Malleco	Mónica Rodríguez Rodríguez	Christian Democratic Party (Chile)	Since 11 March 2018
Malleco	María Elizabeth Gutiérrez Saavedra	Renovación Nacional	Since 11 March 2022
Malleco	Hugo Monsalves Castillo	Independent – Evópoli	Since 11 March 2022
Malleco	Essio Guidotti Vallejos	Party for Democracy	Since 11 March 2022
Malleco	Nicolás Donze Cabezas	Republican Party	Since 6 January 2025
