= Ruth Hurtado =

Chilean constituent

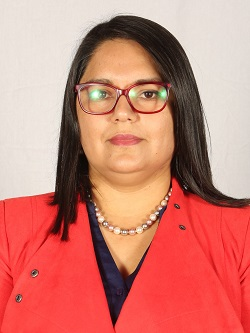

General Secretary of the Republican Party
- Incumbent
- Assumed office 4 February 2023
- Preceded by: Arturo Squella

Member of the Constitutional Convention
- In office 4 July 2021 – 4 July 2022
- Constituency: 22nd District

Personal details
- Born: 9 October 1981 (age 44) Temuco, Chile
- Party: Republican Party
- Education: Autonomous University of Chile (BA)
- Occupation: Constituent

Ruth Hurtado Olave (born 8 October 1981) is a Chilean law student, social work graduate, and politician.

She serves as vice president of the Republican Party of Chile and was elected as a member of the Constitutional Convention in 2021, representing the 22nd District of the Araucanía Region.

== Early life and family ==
Hurtado was born on 8 October 1981 in Temuco, Chile. She is the daughter of José Segundo Hurtado Riquelme and Flor María Olave Pérez.

She is married and has two daughters. She identifies as an Evangelical Christian.

== Professional career ==
Hurtado completed her secondary education at Instituto Superior de Comercio in Temuco. She holds a bachelor’s degree in social work and is currently pursuing a law degree.

She has worked professionally as a parliamentary adviser to National Renewal deputy Miguel Mellado. She has also appeared as a panelist on the morning television program Nuestra Gente, broadcast in the Araucanía Region.

== Political career ==
Hurtado is a member of the Republican Party of Chile and, since 7 January 2022, has served as vice president of the party. In the area of civic participation, she is president of Mujeres por La Araucanía, an organization supporting victims of violence, and a founding member of the Corporación Más Mujeres Líderes.

She is also active within the evangelical church and has established links with pro-life and pro-family organizations. In 2020, she was named one of the 100 Women Leaders of the Region.

In the elections held on 15–16 May 2021, Hurtado ran as a candidate for the Constitutional Convention representing the 22nd District of the Araucanía Region as an independent on a seat supported by National Renewal (Chile), within the Vamos por Chile electoral pact. She obtained 2,019 votes, corresponding to 2.5% of the valid votes cast, and entered the Convention through the gender parity mechanism.
