= Paz Charpentier =

Chilean politician

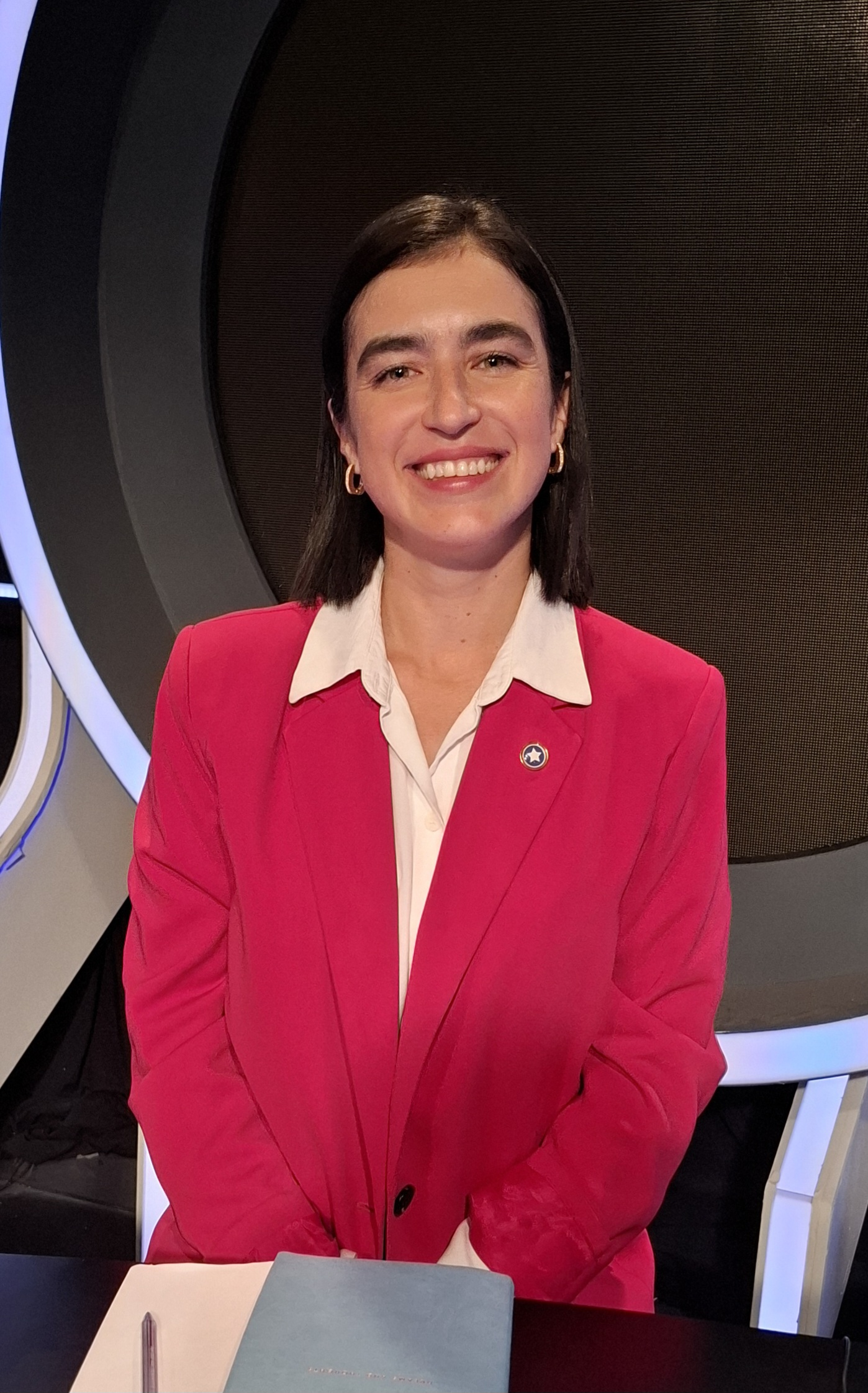

Paz Charpentier is a Chilean politician. A member of the Republican Party, she has served in the Chamber of Deputies of Chile, representing the 20th district.
