= Regional Council of Magallanes y la Antártica Chilena =

Regional council of Chile

Regional Council of the Magallanes y la Antártica Chilena Region
- Consejo Regional de la Región de Magallanes y de la Antártica Chilena

Regional legislative body overview
- Formed: 1993
- Jurisdiction: Magallanes and Chilean Antarctica Region, Chile
- Headquarters: Punta Arenas, Chile
- Minister responsible: Jorge Flies Añón, Regional Governor (President of the Council)
- Parent Regional legislative body: Regional Government of Magallanes and Chilean Antarctica

The Regional Council of the Magallanes y la Antártica Chilena Region (Spanish: Consejo Regional de la Región de Magallanes y de la Antártica Chilena), commonly known as CORE Magallanes, is the regional council of the Magallanes y la Antártica Chilena Region in Chile. It serves as the normative, decision-making, and oversight body within the Regional Government and is responsible for ensuring citizen participation in regional public administration and exercising the powers conferred upon it by the relevant organic constitutional law.

The council is composed of 14 regional councillors elected by popular vote for four-year terms, with the possibility of up to two re-elections. Territorial representation is organized into provincial constituencies corresponding to Magallanes Province, Última Esperanza Province, Tierra del Fuego and Antártica Chilena Province. Councillors serve four-year terms and may be re-elected. Until 2021, the council elected a president from among its members by absolute majority; following a constitutional reform enacted in 2020, the presidency of the regional council is held by law by the Regional Governor.

== Current Regional Council ==
The Regional Council of the Magallanes y la Antártica Chilena Region for the 2025–2029 term is composed of the following councillors:

Constituency	Councillor	Party	Term
Magallanes	Rodolfo Arecheta Baleta	Evolución Política	Since 6 January 2025
Magallanes	Nano Soto Muñoz	National Renewal	Since 6 January 2025
Magallanes	Robert Weissohm Heck	Republican Party	Since 6 January 2025
Magallanes	Juan Morano Cornejo	Christian Democratic Party (Chile)	Since 6 January 2025
Magallanes	Arturo Díaz Valderrama	Broad Front	Since 6 January 2025
Magallanes	Antonio Bradasic Sillard	Socialist Party of Chile	Since 11 March 2018
Magallanes	Roxana Gallardo Concha	Independent – Independent Democratic Union	Since 11 March 2018
Última Esperanza	Ximena Montaña Velásquez	Independent – Broad Front	Since 11 March 2022
Última Esperanza	Max Salas Illanes	Independent – National Renewal	Since 6 January 2025
Última Esperanza	Patricio Gamin Bustamante	Christian Democratic Party (Chile)	Since 11 March 2022
Tierra del Fuego	Rodolfo Cárdenas Alvarado	Radical Party of Chile	Since 11 March 2022
Tierra del Fuego	Andrés López España	Party for Democracy	Since 11 March 2022
Antártica Chilena	José Paredes Soto	National Renewal	Since 6 January 2025
Antártica Chilena	Víctor Pérez Santana	Independent – Christian Democratic Party (Chile)	Since 11 March 2022
