= Metropolitan Regional Council of Santiago =

Regional Council of the Santiago Metropolitan Region
- Consejo Regional de la Región Metropolitana de Santiago
- Coat of arms of the Santiago Metropolitan Region

Regional legislative body overview
- Formed: 1993
- Preceding Regional legislative body: Regional Development Council of the Metropolitan Region
- Jurisdiction: Santiago Metropolitan Region, Chile
- Headquarters: Santiago
- Minister responsible: Claudio Orrego, Regional Governor (President of the Council)
- Parent Regional legislative body: Regional Government of the Santiago Metropolitan Region

The Regional Council of the Santiago Metropolitan Region (Spanish: Consejo Regional de la Región Metropolitana de Santiago), commonly known as CORE Metropolitano, is the regional council of the Santiago Metropolitan Region in Chile. It serves as the normative, decision-making, and oversight body within the scope of the Regional Government of the Santiago Metropolitan Region and is responsible for ensuring citizen participation at the regional level and exercising the powers conferred upon it by the relevant organic constitutional law. Its headquarters are located in the city of Santiago.

The council is composed of 34 councillors elected by direct universal suffrage from the region's eleven electoral constituencies. Councillors serve four-year terms and may be re-elected for a maximum of two additional terms. Until 2021, the council elected a president from among its members by absolute majority; following a constitutional reform enacted in 2020, the presidency of the regional council is held by law by the Regional Governor.

== Current Regional Council ==
The Regional Council for the 2025–2029 term is composed of:

Province	Councillor	Party		Term
Santiago I (Northwest)	Beatriz Albornoz Soto	|	Communist Party	Since 11 March 2022
Santiago I (Northwest)	Nebbia Otárola Leon	|	Renovación Nacional	Since 6 January 2025
Santiago I (Northwest)	Gabriela Gallardo Fuentes	|	Republican Party	Since 6 January 2025
Santiago II (Central)	María Eugenia Puelma Alfaro	|	Communist Party	Since 11 March 2022
Santiago II (Central)	Felipe Obal Durán	|	Renovación Nacional	Since 6 January 2025
Santiago II (Central)	Sonja del Río Becker	|	Republican Party	Since 6 January 2025
Santiago II (Central)	Dióscoro Rojas Campos	|	Socialist Party	Since 11 March 2018
Santiago III (West)	Leslie Venegas Venegas	|	Broad Front	Since 6 January 2025
Santiago III (West)	Nicolás Jara Lira	|	Broad Front	Since 6 January 2025
Santiago III (West)	Alfredo Vergara Catalán	|	Republican Party	Since 6 January 2025
Santiago IV (Northeast)	Ignacio Dulger	|	Republican Party	Since 6 March 2025
Santiago IV (Northeast)	Álvaro Bellolio Avaria	|	Independent Democratic Union	Since 6 January 2025
Santiago IV (Northeast)	Ximena Peralta Fierro	|	Broad Front	Since 6 January 2025
Santiago IV (Northeast)	Karin Luck Urban	|	Renovación Nacional	Since 6 January 2025
Santiago V (Southeast)	Rodrigo Donoso Baeza	|	Republican Party	Since 6 January 2025
Santiago V (Southeast)	Danae Prado Carmona	|	Communist Party	Since 11 March 2022
Santiago V (Southeast)	Sergio Morales Méndez	|	Independent – Republican Party	Since 6 March 2025
Santiago V (Southeast)	Marcelo Zunino Poblete	|	Renovación Nacional	Since 11 March 2018
Santiago VI (South)	Claudina Núñez Jiménez	|	Communist Party	Since 11 March 2022
Santiago VI (South)	María Ponti Rissetti	|	Renovación Nacional	Since 11 March 2022
Santiago VI (South)	Felipe Serey Guerra	|	Republican Party	Since 6 January 2025
Santiago VI (South)	Carolina Oteiza Fuenzalida	|	Socialist Party	Since 11 March 2022
Cordillera	José Soto Madrid	|	Renovación Nacional	Since 6 January 2025
Cordillera	Valeria Ortega Contreras	|	Independent – Communist Party	Since 11 March 2022
Cordillera	Edith Aedo Meza	|	Republican Party	Since 6 January 2025
Maipo	Víctor Valdés Landeros	|	Republican Party	Since 6 January 2025
Maipo	Nicole Aguilera Ramírez	|	Independent Democratic Union	Since 6 January 2025
Maipo	Sadi Melo Moya	|	Socialist Party	Since 6 January 2025
Chacabuco	Pedro Herreros Bajares	|	Independent Democratic Union	Since 6 January 2025
Chacabuco	Carlos Telleria Gútierrez	|	Republican Party	Since 6 January 2025
Melipilla	Cristina Soto Messina	|	Party for Democracy	Since 11 March 2022
Melipilla	Javier Ramíerez González	|	Independent Democratic Union	Since 5 March 2025
Talagante	Maricel Donoso Doria	|	Socialist Party	Since 6 January 2025
Talagante	Javier González Kazazian	|	Republican Party	Since 6 January 2025
