= Regional Council of Valparaíso =

- Consejo Regional de la Región de Valparaíso
- Coat of arms of the Valparaíso Region

Regional legislative body overview
- Formed: 1993
- Preceding Regional legislative body: Regional Development Council of the V Region
- Jurisdiction: Valparaíso Region, Chile
- Headquarters: Valparaíso, Chile
- Minister responsible: Rodrigo Mundaca, Regional Governor (President of the Council)
- Parent Regional legislative body: Regional Government of Valparaíso

The Regional Council of the Valparaíso Region (Spanish: Consejo Regional de la Región de Valparaíso), commonly known as CORE Valparaíso, is the regional council of the Valparaíso Region in Chile. It serves as the normative, decision-making, and oversight body within the scope of the Regional Government of Valparaíso and is responsible for ensuring citizen participation at the regional level and exercising the powers conferred upon it by the relevant organic constitutional law. Its headquarters are located in the city of Valparaíso.

The council is composed of 28 councillors elected by direct universal suffrage from the region's provinces. Councillors serve four-year terms and may be re-elected for a maximum of two additional terms. Until 2021, the council elected a president from among its members by absolute majority; following a constitutional reform enacted in 2020, the presidency of the regional council is held by law by the Regional Governor.

== Current Regional Council ==
The Regional Council for the 2025–2029 term is composed of:

Province	Councillor	Party	Term
Valparaíso I (North)	Marcela Varas Fuentes	PPD	Since 6 January 2025
Valparaíso I (North)	Tania Valenzuela Rossi	FA	Since 11 March 2018
Valparaíso I (North)	Javier Venegas Muñoz	PRCh	Since 6 January 2025
Valparaíso I (North)	Osvaldo Urrutia Soto	UDI	Since 6 January 2025
Valparaíso I (North)	Catalina Thauby Krebs	PRCh	Since 6 January 2025
Valparaíso II (South)	Paula Rosso Montenegro	FA	Since 6 January 2025
Valparaíso II (South)	Omar Valdivia Álvarez	PPD	Since 6 January 2025
Valparaíso II (South)	José Luis Miranda Muñoz	PRCh	Since 11 March 2022
Valparaíso II (South)	Paulina Yáñez Gula	PRCh	Since 6 January 2025
Isla de Pascua	Sabrina Tuki Pont	EVO	Since 6 January 2025
Isla de Pascua	Francisco Haoa Hotus	Independent – PS	Since 6 January 2025
Los Andes	María Rodríguez Herrera	Independent – FREVS	Since 11 March 2018
Los Andes	Edith Quiroz Ortiz	RN	Since 11 March 2018
Marga Marga	María Rubilar Muñoz	FA	Since 6 January 2025
Marga Marga	Emmanuel Olfos Vargas	Independent – RN	Since 6 January 2025
Marga Marga	Elsa Bueno Cortés	PRCh	Since 6 January 2025
Marga Marga	Cristián Fuentes Duque	PRCh	Since 6 January 2025
Petorca	Juan Ibacache Ibacache	RN	Since 6 January 2025
Petorca	Christian Pinilla Ibacache	PRCh	Since 6 January 2025
Quillota	Giselle Ahumada Espina	Independent – PC	Since 6 January 2025
Quillota	Felipe Córdoba Araya	PRCh	Since 6 January 2025
Quillota	Lautaro Correa Castillo	Independent – PS	Since 6 January 2025
San Antonio	Romy Farías Caballero	PDC	Since 6 January 2025
San Antonio	Mauricio López Castillo	PRCh	Since 6 January 2025
San Antonio	Paola Zamorano Arratia	RN	Since 11 March 2022
San Felipe	Rodolfo Silva González	Independent – RN	Since 6 January 2025
San Felipe	Maricel Martínez Vicencio	PPD	Since 6 January 2025
San Felipe	Fernando Astorga Terraza	PRCh	Since 6 January 2025
