= Regional Council of Tarapacá =

- Consejo Regional de la Región de Tarapacá
- Coat of arms of the Tarapacá Region

Regional legislative body overview
- Formed: 2007
- Preceding Regional legislative body: Regional Development Council of the I Region
- Jurisdiction: Tarapacá Region, Chile
- Headquarters: Iquique, Chile
- Minister responsible: José Miguel Carvajal Gallardo, Regional Governor (President of the Council)
- Parent Regional legislative body: Regional Government of Tarapacá

The Regional Council of the Tarapacá Region (Spanish: Consejo Regional de la Región de Tarapacá), commonly known as CORE Tarapacá, is the regional council of the Tarapacá Region in Chile. It serves as the normative, decision-making, and oversight body within the scope of the Regional Government of Tarapacá and is responsible for ensuring citizen participation at the regional level and exercising the powers conferred upon it by the relevant organic constitutional law. Its headquarters are located in the city of Iquique.

The council is composed of 14 councillors elected by direct universal suffrage from the region's two provinces: 11 from Iquique Province, and 3 from Tamarugal Province. Councillors serve four-year terms and may be re-elected for a maximum of two additional terms. Until 2021, the council elected a president from among its members by absolute majority; following a constitutional reform enacted in 2020, the presidency of the regional council is held by law by the Regional Governor.

== Current Regional Council ==
The Regional Council for the 2025–2029 term is composed of:

Province	Councillor	Party	Term
Iquique	Sergio Assarella Alvarado	Radical Party	Since 11 March 2022
Iquique	Luis Domingo Milla	Party of the People	Since 6 January 2025
Iquique	Giovanna Trincado Avilés	Renovación Nacional	Since 6 January 2025
Iquique	Néstor Jofré Núñez	Renovación Nacional	Since 6 January 2025
Iquique	Francisco Lincheo Torrejón	Democrats	Since 6 January 2025
Iquique	Mauricio Schmidt Silva	Independent Democratic Union	Since 11 March 2022
Iquique	Lorena Ramírez Palma	Republican Party	Since 6 January 2025
Iquique	Anally Ferreira Herrera	Christian Democratic Party	Since 6 January 2025
Iquique	Lautaro Lobos Lara	Party for Democracy	Since 6 January 2025
Iquique	Octavio López Ávalos	Humanist Action	Since 6 January 2025
Iquique	Jorge Muñoz González	Republican Party	Since 6 January 2025
Tamarugal	Hugo Estica Esteban	Christian Democratic Party	Since 6 January 2025
Tamarugal	Eduardo Mamani Mamani	Renovación Nacional	Since 11 March 2018
Tamarugal	Lucero Callpa Flores	Christian Democratic Party	Since 6 January 2025
