= Regional Council of Arica y Parinacota =

- Consejo Regional de la Región de Arica y Parinacota
- Logo of the Regional Government of Arica y Parinacota

Regional legislative body overview
- Formed: 2007
- Preceding Regional legislative body: Regional Development Council of the XV Region
- Jurisdiction: Arica y Parinacota Region, Chile
- Headquarters: Arica
- Minister responsible: Jorge Díaz Ibarra, Regional Governor (President of the Council)
- Parent Regional legislative body: Regional Government of Arica y Parinacota

The Regional Council of the Arica y Parinacota Region (Spanish: Consejo Regional de la Región de Arica y Parinacota), commonly known as CORE Arica y Parinacota, is the regional council of the Arica y Parinacota Region in Chile. It serves as the normative, decision-making, and oversight body within the scope of the Regional Government of Arica y Parinacota and is responsible for ensuring citizen participation at the regional level and exercising the powers conferred upon it by the relevant organic constitutional law. Its headquarters are located in the city of Arica.

The council is composed of 14 councillors elected by direct universal suffrage from the region's two provinces: 11 from Arica Province, and 3 from Parinacota Province. Councillors serve four-year terms and may be re-elected for a maximum of two additional terms. Until 2021, the council elected a president from among its members by absolute majority; following a constitutional reform enacted in 2020, the presidency of the regional council is held by law by the Regional Governor.

== Current Regional Council ==
The Regional Council for the 2025–2029 term is composed of:

Province	Councillor	Party	Term
Arica	Romina Cifuentes Gutiérrez	Republican Party	Since 5 January 2025
Arica	Christian Villanueva Rosales	Independent – Christian Social Party	Since 6 January 2025
Arica	Carlos Ojeda Murillo	Humanist Party	Since 6 January 2025
Arica	Marcelo González Olivares	Christian Democratic Party	Since 11 March 2018
Arica	Denisse Morales Flores	Independent – Socialist Party	Since 11 March 2022
Arica	María Victoriano Cautivo	Communist Party	Since 6 January 2025
Arica	Lin-Kiu Ly Fumey	National Libertarian Party	Since 5 January 2025
Arica	Oscar Pantoja Rivera	Liberal Party	Since 11 March 2022
Arica	Sofía Clavijo Medalla	Renovación Nacional	Since 11 March 2022
Arica	Nino Estay Espinoza	Democrats	Since 5 January 2025
Arica	Ignacio Gómez Gutiérrez	Republican Party	Since 5 January 2025
Parinacota	Lorena Ventura Vásquez	Renovación Nacional	Since 11 March 2022
Parinacota	Hermes Gómez Gallardo	Independent – Independent Democratic Union	Since 6 January 2025
Parinacota	Daniel Linares Zegarra	Independent – Democrats	Since 6 January 2025
