= Regional Council of Ñuble =

Regional council in Chile

Regional Council of the Ñuble Region
- Consejo Regional de la Región de Ñuble
- Coat of arms of the Ñuble Region

Regional legislative body overview
- Formed: 2018
- Jurisdiction: Ñuble Region, Chile
- Headquarters: Chillán, Chile
- Minister responsible: Óscar Crisóstomo Llanos, Regional Governor (President of the Council)
- Parent Regional legislative body: Regional Government of Ñuble

The Regional Council of the Ñuble Region (Spanish: Consejo Regional de la Región de Ñuble), commonly known as CORE Ñuble, is the regional council of the Ñuble Region in Chile. It serves as the normative, decision-making, and oversight body within the Regional Government and is responsible for ensuring citizen participation in regional public administration and exercising the powers conferred upon it by the relevant organic constitutional law.

The council is composed of 16 regional councillors elected by popular vote for four-year terms, with the possibility of up to two re-elections. Territorial representation is distributed among the region’s three provinces: eight councillors from Diguillín Province, four from Itata Province, and four from Punilla Province. Councillors serve four-year terms and may be re-elected. Until 2021, the council elected a president from among its members by absolute majority; following a constitutional reform enacted in 2020, the presidency of the regional council is held by law by the Regional Governor.

== Current Regional Council ==
The Regional Council of Ñuble for the 2025–2029 term is composed of the following councillors:

Province	Councillor	Party	Term
Diguillín	Carlos Chandía Bravo	Independent Democratic Union	Since 6 January 2025
Diguillín	Christopher Casanova González	Republican Party	Since 6 January 2025
Diguillín	María Acuña Olivera	Republican Party	Since 6 January 2025
Diguillín	Bárbara Hennig Godoy	Renovación Nacional	Since 6 January 2025
Diguillín	Marcelo Cifuentes Cifuentes	Socialist Party of Chile	Since 6 January 2025
Diguillín	Mario Urra Zambrano	Independent – Christian Democratic Party (Chile)	Since 6 January 2025
Diguillín	Geraldine Aravena Godoy	Social Christian Party (Chile, 2022)	Since 6 January 2025
Diguillín	Daniela Guzmán Yévenes	Socialist Party of Chile	Since 6 January 2025
Itata	Dalibor Franulic Muñoz	Renovación Nacional	Since 6 January 2025
Itata	Carlos Garrido Cárcamo	Independent Democratic Union	Since 6 January 2025
Itata	Iter Stuardo Malverde	Independent – Christian Democratic Party (Chile)	Since 11 March 2022
Itata	Wilson Ponce Hernández	Independent – Radical Party of Chile	Since 6 January 2025
Punilla	Lorena Jardua Campos	Independent Democratic Union	Since 6 January 2025
Punilla	Sergio Ruiz Aedo	Independent – Renovación Nacional	Since 6 January 2025
Punilla	Pablo Jiménez Acuña	Socialist Party of Chile	Since 6 January 2025
Punilla	Arnoldo Jiménez Venegas	Independent – Radical Party of Chile	Since 11 March 2022
