= Regional councils of Chile =

Regional councils of Chile (Spanish: consejos regionales) are collegiate public bodies with normative, decision-making, and oversight functions within the regional governments of Chile. They operate in each of the Regions of Chile and, together with the regional governor, form the regional government structure.

Regional councils ensure citizen participation in regional administration and exercise powers established by the Organic Constitutional Law on Government and Regional Administration (Law No. 19,175).

== History ==
Regional councils were created through a constitutional reform in 1991 and implemented by Law No. 19,175 in 1992.

Until 2013, regional councillors were indirectly elected by municipal councillors. Following a constitutional reform, councillors began to be elected by direct popular vote for four-year terms.

Since 2021, each regional council is chaired by the regional governor.

== Composition ==
The number of councillors in each region varies according to population:

- 14 councillors in regions with up to 400,000 inhabitants
- 16 councillors in regions with 400,001 to 800,000 inhabitants
- 20 councillors in regions with 800,001 to 1,500,000 inhabitants
- 28 councillors in regions with more than 1,500,000 inhabitants
- 34 councillors in the Metropolitan Region of Santiago

Councillors are elected by province or provincial constituency, with each province represented by at least two members.

== Functions ==
Regional councils exercise planning, regulatory, and oversight functions, including approving regional development plans and budgets; allocating regional investment funds; approving land-use planning instruments; supervising the regional governor and regional administration; approving regional tourism development plans; and issuing opinions on regional administrative changes.

== Operation ==
Regional councils operate through public ordinary and extraordinary sessions. Decisions are generally adopted by majority vote, subject to legal quorum requirements.

== List of regional councils ==
Region	Regional council
Arica y Parinacota	Regional Council of Arica and Parinacota
Tarapacá	Regional Council of Tarapacá
Antofagasta	Regional Council of Antofagasta
Atacama	Regional Council of Atacama
Coquimbo	Regional Council of Coquimbo
Valparaíso	Regional Council of Valparaíso
Metropolitan Region of Santiago	Metropolitan Regional Council of Santiago
O'Higgins	Regional Council of O'Higgins
Maule	Regional Council of Maule
Ñuble	Regional Council of Ñuble
Biobío	Regional Council of Biobío
La Araucanía	Regional Council of La Araucanía
Los Ríos	Regional Council of Los Ríos
Los Lagos	Regional Council of Los Lagos
Aysén	Regional Council of Aysén
Magallanes and Chilean Antarctica	Regional Council of Magallanes and Chilean Antarctica

== See also ==
- Regional governments of Chile
- Regions of Chile
