= Conchalí =

- Commune
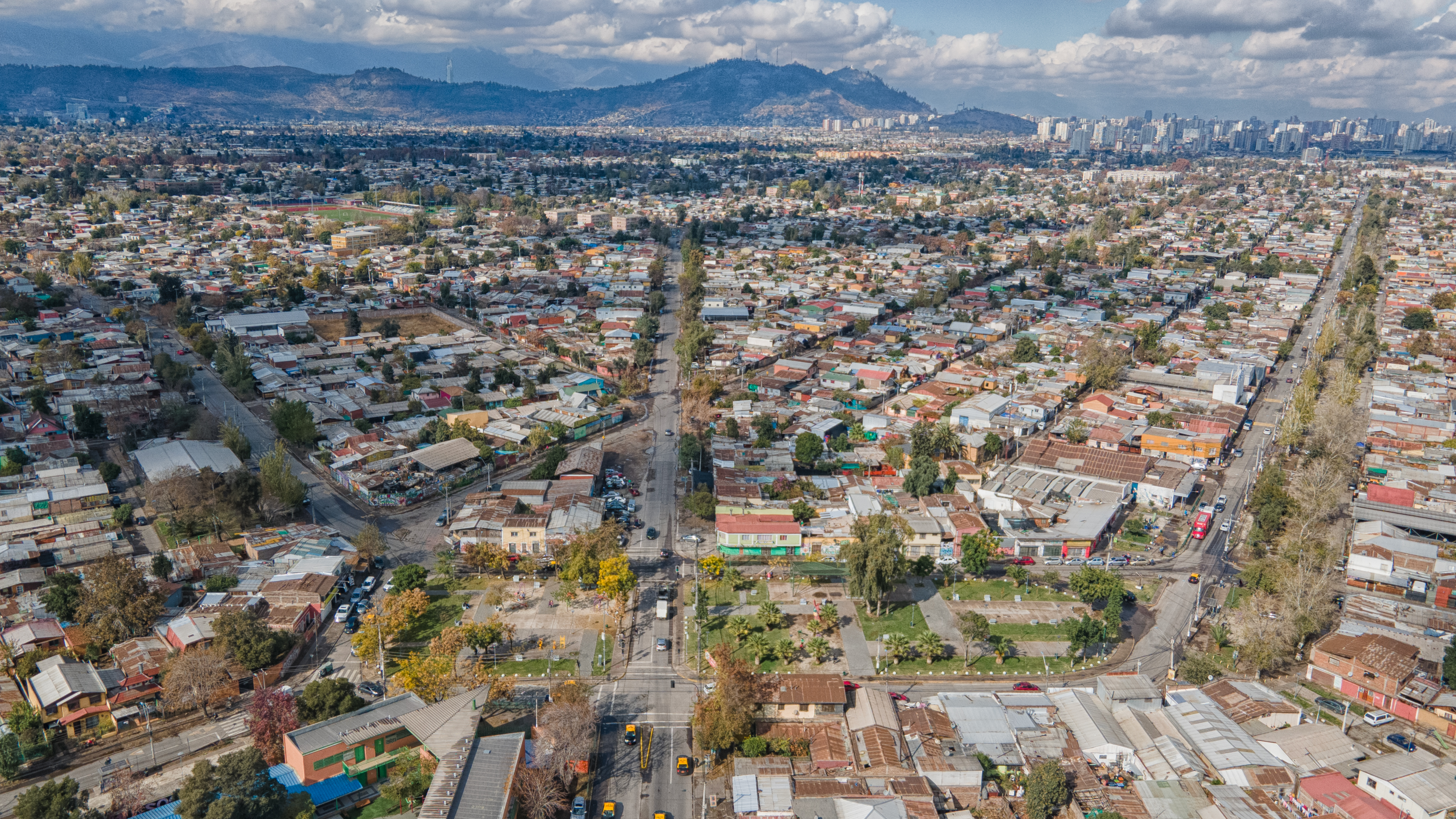
- Panoramic view, Palmilla plaza in front.

- Flag Coat of arms Conchalí within Greater Santiago Location in Chile
- Coordinates (city): 33°23′00″S 70°40′30″W
- Country: Chile
- Region: Santiago Metropolitan Region
- Province: Santiago
- Established: 30 December 1927

Government
  - Type: Municipality
  - Alcalde: René de la Vega (Ind.)

Area
  - Total: 10.7 km^{2} (4.1 sq mi)

Population (2024)
  - Total: 121,587
  - Density: 11,400/km^{2} (29,400/sq mi)
  - Urban: 121,587
  - Rural: 0
- Demonym: Conchalino
- Time zone: UTC-4 (CLT)
  - Summer (DST): UTC-3 (CLST)
- Area code: 56 +
- Website: Municipality of Conchali

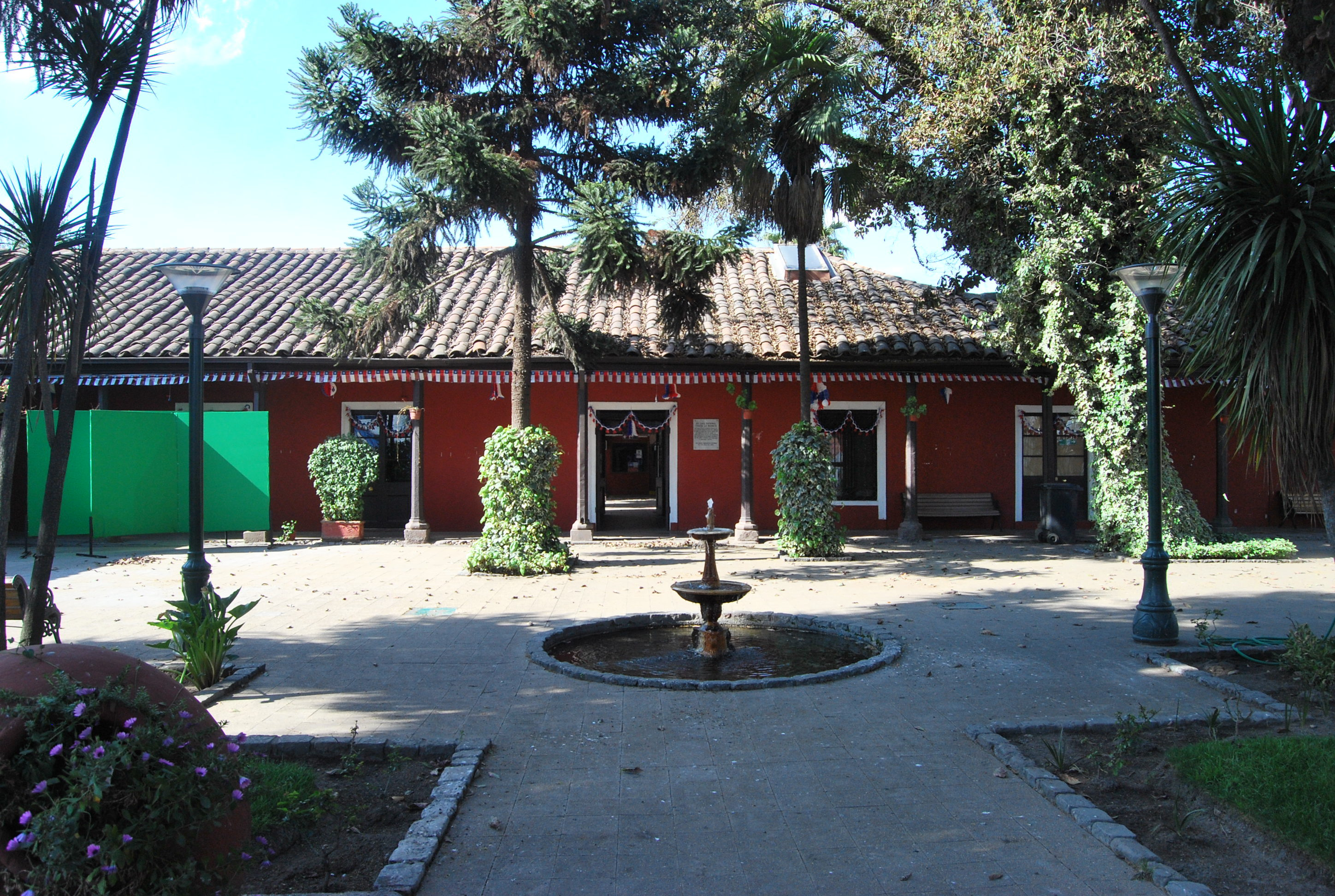
City Hall

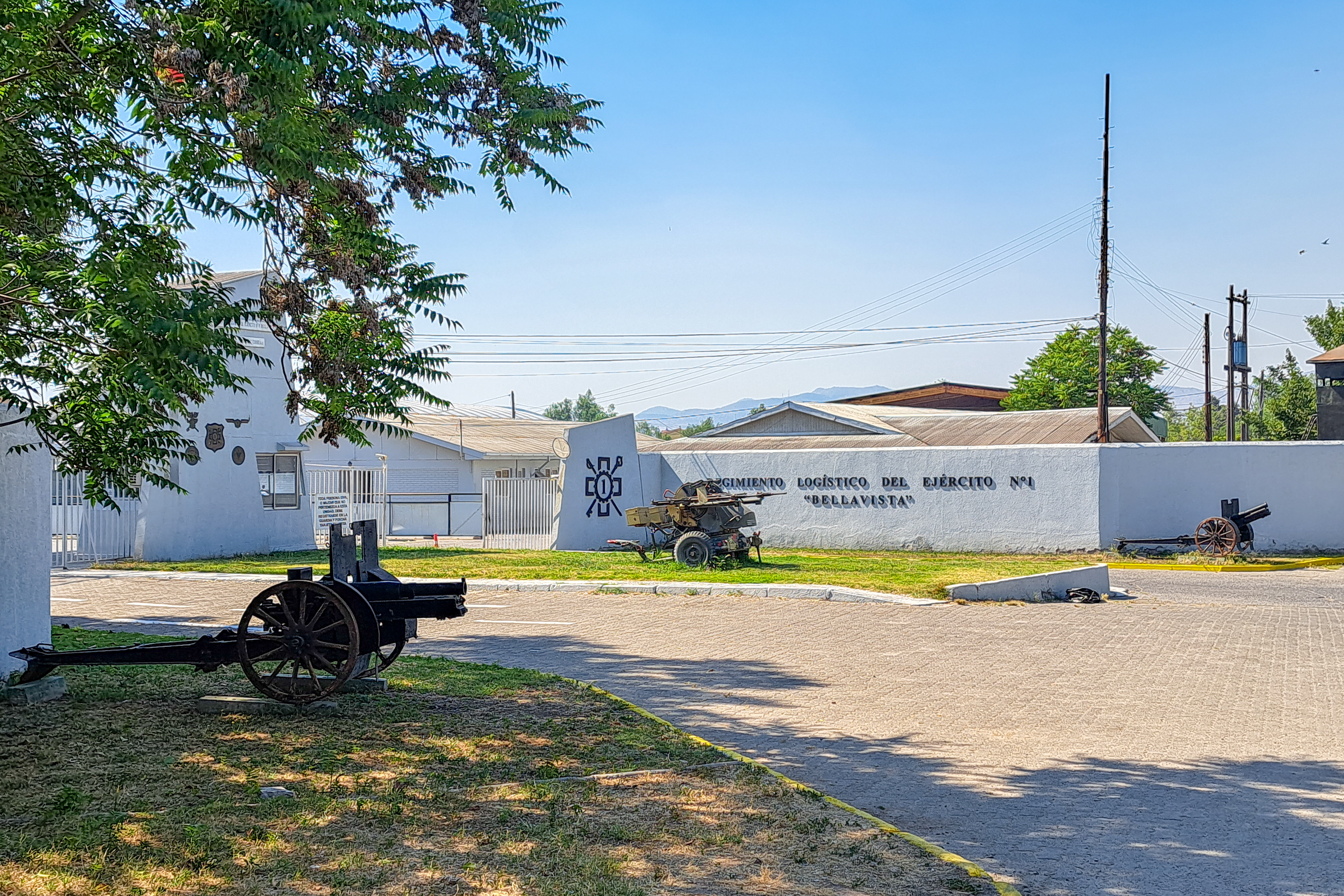
Logistic Regimient "Army Bellavista"

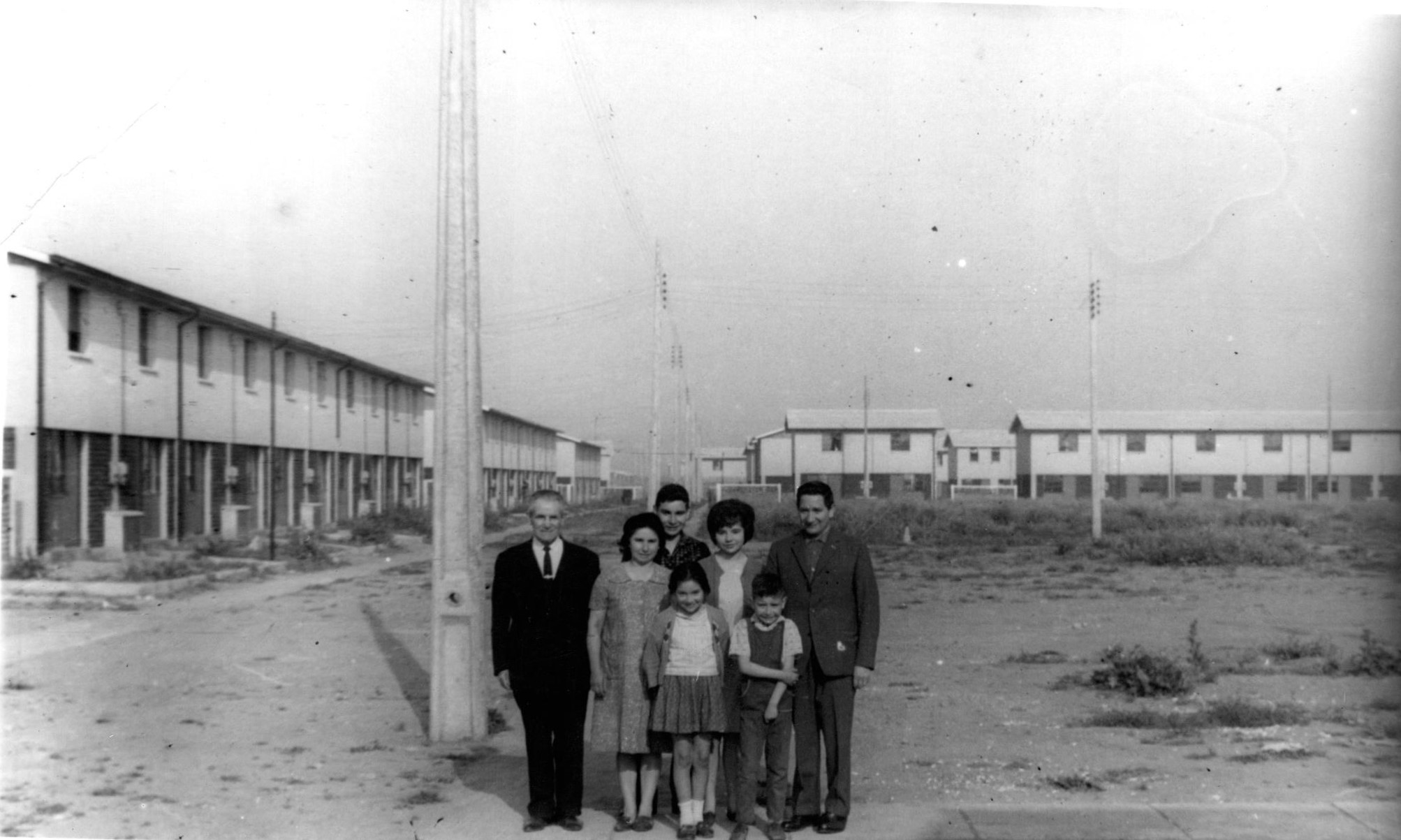
Eneas Gonel nighborhood in 1965

Conchalí (Spanish: [kontʃaˈli]) is a commune of the city of Santiago in the Santiago Province of the Santiago Metropolitan Region in Chile. Located north of the city center, it has 121,587 inhabitants.

== Demographics ==
As of the 2024 census, the population is 121,587, of which 48.6% are male and 51.4% are female. People under 15 years old make up 16.5% of the population, and people over 65 years old make up 15.8%. 100% of the population is urban.

Historical population

Year	Pop.	±% p.a.
1875	2,002	—
1885	2,233	+1.10%
1895	4,043	+6.12%
1907	8,997	+6.89%
1920	11,951	+2.21%
1930	20,817	+5.71%
1940	35,737	+5.55%

Year	Pop.	±% p.a.
1952	83,019	+7.28%
1970	117,405	+1.94%
1982	157,884	+2.50%
1992	152,919	−0.32%
2002	133,256	−1.37%
2017	126,955	−0.32%
2024	121,587	−0.62%

Source: INE, Memoria Chilena

- Average annual household income: US$24,396 (PPP, 2006)
- Population below poverty line: 8.0% (2006)
- Regional quality of life index: 78.61, mid-high, 16 out of 52 (2005)
- Human Development Index: 0.707, 118 out of 341 (2003)

=== Immigration ===
As of the 2024 census, immigrants make up 14.5% of the population - 12.9% are from South America, 1.5% from North America, 0.1% from Europe, 0.1% from Asia, 0.01% from Africa, and 0.001% from Oceania.

== Administration ==
As a commune, Conchalí is a third-level administrative division of Chile administered by a municipal council, headed by a mayor who is directly elected every four years. The current mayor is René de la Vega (Ind) since 2016. The communal council has the following members:

- Paula Pérez Espinoza (PC)
- Hernán Corona Sánchez (UDI)
- Patricia Molina Molina (DC)
- Lissette Ponce Palacios (PPD)
- Martín Muñoz Olivares (REP)
- Krishna Narváez Espinoza (REP)
- Miguel Astudillo Cáceres (RN)
- Marjorie Melo Valenzuela (PH)

Within the electoral divisions of Chile, Conchalí is represented in the Chamber of Deputies by Karla Rubilar (RN) and Daniel Farcas Guendelman (PPD) as part of the 17th electoral district, (together with Renca and Huechuraba). The commune is represented in the Senate by Guido Girardi Lavín (PPD) and Andrés Allamand Zavala (RN) as part of the 7th senatorial constituency (Santiago-West).
