= José Carlos Meza =

Chilean politician (born 1989)

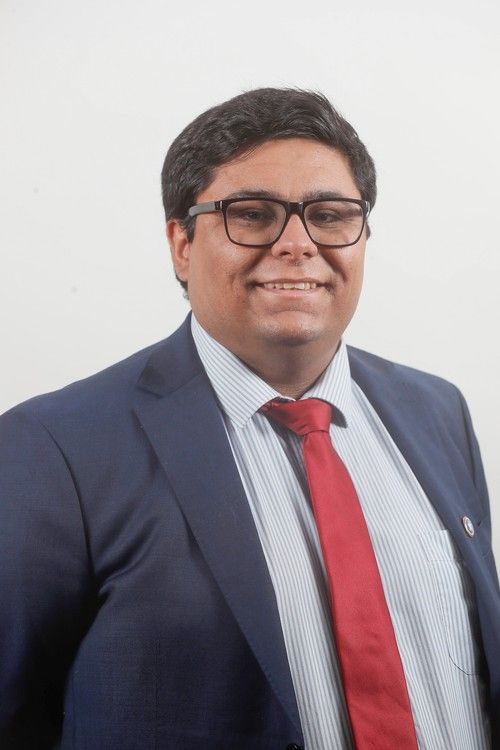

Member of the Chamber of Deputies
- Incumbent
- Assumed office 11 March 2022
- Constituency: District 9

Personal details
- Born: 7 March 1989 (age 37) Melipilla, Chile
- Party: Republican Party (2019–)
- Education: Pontifical Catholic University of Valparaíso
- Occupation: Politician
- Profession: Lawyer

José Carlos Meza Pereira (born 7 March 1989) is a Chilean politician who was elected as deputy on 21 November 2021.

== Early life ==
Meza was born in the rural town of San José in Melipilla, where he spent his childhood and part of his adolescence. He was raised in a Catholic family made up of José Meza, a construction worker, and Gloria Pereira, a peasant woman dedicated to temporary fruit picking. José Carlos Meza also has a twin brother and two other siblings. He completed his primary studies at the rural school San José de la Villa, while his secondary studies were at the Liceo Hermanos Sotomayor Baeza in that commune near to Santiago Metropolitan Region.

In 2007, Meza entered the Pontifical Catholic University of Valparaíso to study Law. Fourteen years later, in January 2021, he obtained his law degree from the Chilean Supreme Court.

== Political career ==
At the PUCV he was close to gremialism and became a student leader, being an opponent of the university takeovers then directed by Jorge Sharp.

From 2017 to 2018, he provided legislative advice to María José Hoffmann, deputy for the 2018−2022 period. During that period, he served as executive director of Acción Republicana, then institutionalized wing of José Antonio Kast's conservative social movement.

Later, in 2019, Meza was a founding member of Kast's Republican Party.
