= Regional Council of Aysén =

Regional council of Chile

Regional Council of the Aysén Region
- Consejo Regional de la Región de Aysén
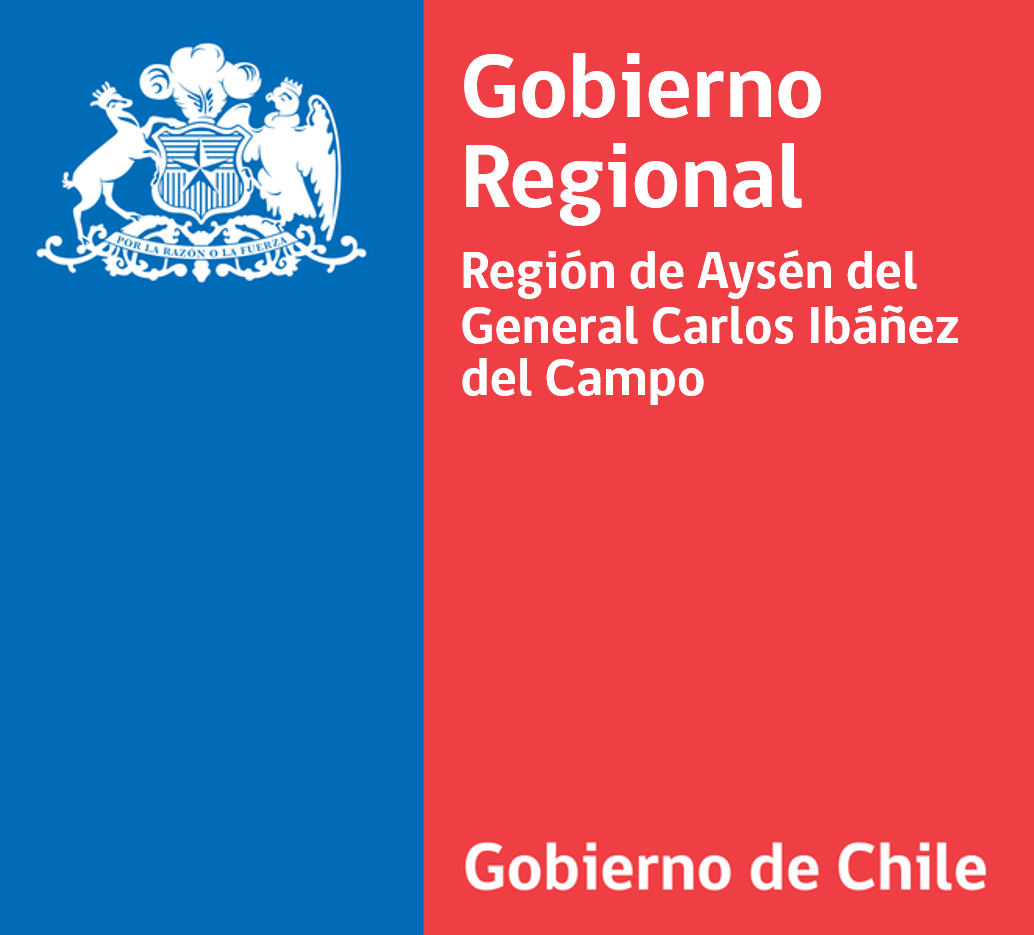
- Logo of the Aysén Regional Government (until 2021)

Regional legislative body overview
- Formed: 1993
- Jurisdiction: Aysén Region, Chile
- Headquarters: Coyhaique, Chile
- Minister responsible: Andrea Macías Palma, Regional Governor (President of the Council)
- Parent Regional legislative body: Regional Government of Aysén

The Regional Council of the Aysén Region (Spanish: Consejo Regional de la Región de Aysén), commonly known as CORE Aysén, is the regional council of the Aysén Region in Chile. It serves as the normative, decision-making, and oversight body within the Regional Government and is responsible for ensuring citizen participation in regional public administration and exercising the powers conferred upon it by the relevant organic constitutional law.

The council is composed of 14 regional councillors elected by popular vote for four-year terms, with the possibility of up to two re-elections. Territorial representation is organized into provincial constituencies, distributed among Coyhaique Province, Aysén Province, General Carrera Province and Capitán Prat Province. Councillors serve four-year terms and may be re-elected. Until 2021, the council elected a president from among its members by absolute majority; following a constitutional reform enacted in 2020, the presidency of the regional council is held by law by the Regional Governor.

== Current Regional Council ==
The Regional Council of the Aysén Region for the 2025–2029 term is composed of the following councillors:

| Constituency | Councillor | Party | Term |
|---|---|---|---|
| Coyhaique | Omar Muñoz Sierra | Independent Democratic Union | Since 11 March 2022 |
| Coyhaique | Pablo Guglielmi Asenjo | National Renewal | Since 6 January 2025 |
| Coyhaique | Gustavo Villarroel Pinilla | Radical Party of Chile | Since 6 January 2025 |
| Coyhaique | Benjamín Infante Rodríguez-Peña | Communist Party of Chile | Since 6 January 2025 |
| Coyhaique | Rocco Antonio Martiniello Ávila | Christian Democratic Party (Chile) | Since 11 March 2018 |
| Coyhaique | Marisol Martínez Sánchez | Socialist Party of Chile | Since 11 March 2022 |
| Aysén | Julio Rossel González | Socialist Party of Chile | Since 6 January 2025 |
| Aysén | Rosa González Bórquez | Christian Democratic Party (Chile) | Since 6 January 2025 |
| Aysén | Ximena Novoa Pérez | National Renewal | Since 6 January 2025 |
| Aysén | Eligio Montecinos Araya | Independent Democratic Union | Since 6 January 2025 |
| General Carrera | Paulina Hernández Sánchez | Christian Democratic Party (Chile) | Since 11 March 2022 |
| General Carrera | Arcadio Soto Serón | Independent Democratic Union | Since 6 January 2025 |
| Capitán Prat | Ana María Mora Araneda | National Renewal | Since 6 January 2025 |
| Capitán Prat | Rodrigo Rivera Tejeda | Independent – Independent Democratic Union | Since 6 January 2025 |
