= Arturo Squella =

Chilean politician (born 1978)

- Squella in 2026

Member of the Senate
- Incumbent
- Assumed office 11 March 2026
- Constituency: District 6

Member of the Chamber of Deputies
- In office 11 March 2010 – 11 March 2018
- Constituency: District 12

Personal details
- Born: 25 September 1978 (age 48)
- Party: Republican Party (since 2019)
- Parent: Arturo Squella Serrano (father)

Luis Arturo Squella Ovalle (born 25 September 1978) is a Chilean politician serving as a member of the Senate since 2026. He has served as president of the Republican Party since 2023. From 2010 to 2018, he was a member of the Chamber of Deputies.
