= Illegal immigration to Chile =

Illegal immigration to Chile refers to the entry and residence of foreign nationals without legal authorization. The phenomenon grew significantly from the 1990s onward, as Chile's political stability and sustained economic growth made it a major destination for regional migration. Most undocumented immigrants come from neighboring countries such as Peru and Bolivia, as well as from Colombia, Venezuela, and Caribbean nations, particularly Haiti and the Dominican Republic. This migration is driven by economic hardship and insecurity in their countries of origin, Chile's comparatively accessible immigration policies, and the persistence of its outdated 1975 immigration law. The issue has sparked political debate, social tensions, and policy reforms aimed at balancing border control with the protection of migrants' rights.

== Causes ==
Following the end of Augusto Pinochet's dictatorship in 1990, Chile restored and restructured its democracy. The stability of the new government under Patricio Aylwin, combined with strong economic growth, made Chile an attractive destination for immigrants. The country has since transitioned into a high-income economy, marking a significant shift in its global socioeconomic status. It is now considered one of the most politically stable countries in Latin America and achieved membership in the Organisation for Economic Co-operation and Development (OECD) in 2010, solidifying its status as a developed country. Consequently, Chile transformed from a nation that sent migrants abroad to one that receives them.

A key factor is Chile's continued use of its 1975 immigration policy (DL 1094), enacted during the Pinochet dictatorship, while other traditional destinations like Argentina, Japan, and the United States tightened their immigration controls, diverting migrant flows toward Chile.

Much of the illegal immigration to Chile originates from within South America. In 1998, for instance, an estimated 40,000 undocumented immigrants were from Peru, compared to 4,000 from Bolivia, 3,000 from Argentina, and 2,000 from El Salvador—though these numbers have since shifted, with Bolivian migration increasing. In 2018, Chile experienced a 64% growth in permanent migration inflows from the previous year. This movement is typically a response to economic and political instability in migrants' home countries.

=== Peruvian immigration ===
A significant portion of immigrants to Chile are Peruvian. Geographic proximity lowers travel costs and enables migrants to maintain family ties in Peru. A shared language also makes Chile a more accessible destination than more distant countries like the United States or Japan.

Primary destination countries for Peruvian emigrants
| Destination | Percentage of total emigrants |
|---|---|
| United States | 31.5 |
| Spain | 16.0 |
| Argentina | 14.3 |
| Italy | 10.1 |
| Chile | 8.8 |
| Japan | 4.1 |
| Venezuela | 3.8 |

Many Peruvian immigrants who arrived in the 1990s are second- or third-generation descendants of indigenous peoples who moved from rural areas to Peruvian cities during the agricultural crisis of the 1960s. Throughout the 1990s, the government of Alberto Fujimori presided over rising poverty, with 54% of Peru's population living below the poverty line. Between 1980 and 1993, terrorist violence in the country also displaced approximately half a million people.

=== Bolivian immigration ===
In 2015, Bolivia had a higher rate of emigration (50.8%) than immigration. An estimated 60% of Bolivian immigration to Chile is undocumented, driven primarily by economic factors. In 2011, Bolivia's national poverty rate exceeded 50%, with 26.1% of the population in extreme poverty. The 2010 Human Development Report ranked Bolivia lowest among South American nations, citing a large rural population and a significant income gap.

=== Colombian immigration ===
A substantial number of Colombian immigrants originate from the Valle del Cauca Department, driven by regional poverty and the impact of the Colombian conflict.

=== Haitian and Dominican immigration ===
Economic and political instability in Haiti, exacerbated by the 2010 earthquake, led to a 76% increase in indefinite residency visas for Haitians in Chile between 2005 and 2015. This trend reflects a broader wave of immigration, including undocumented arrivals. The socioeconomic vulnerability of Haitians has made them targets for human trafficking networks with routes ending in Chile.

Similarly, migration from the Dominican Republic is driven by economic pressures. Of the approximately 15,000 Dominican immigrants who arrived in Chile in 2016, only about one-third entered legally. Undocumented crossings increased after Chile introduced a visa requirement for Dominican citizens in 2012, which mandates proof of financial stability and a host in Chile.

== Process ==
=== Crossing the border ===
Many undocumented immigrants from Peru are recruited by Chilean employers as a source of cheap labor. They often enter Chile as tourists and subsequently work in poor conditions for low pay. Between 1992 and 2002, labor migration increased from 31% to 48%, while professional and technical migration decreased by 64%. Sex trafficking is also prevalent. A 2011-2013 report on human trafficking found that 85% of sex and labor trafficking cases involved victims sold by friends or family members, while 6% resulted from internet contact.

Undocumented Dominican and Haitian immigrants typically fly to northern South America, travel to Lima, and enter Chile by bus. Intermediaries are paid to transport migrants along this route. Some Dominican immigrants have fallen victim to scams offering valid documentation in exchange for payment, only to be charged later for undocumented entry. Others cross the Atacama Desert on foot, a dangerous journey due to residual land mines from the Pinochet era. The Chilean government has attempted to block migration routes with border walls, but the country's extensive perimeter makes this approach costly and ineffective.

=== Legal punishment ===
Under Chile's 1975 Immigration Law, undocumented immigrants can face sanctions from migration officials. Initial offenses that typically result in a warning include:

1. Working illegally in the country
2. Remaining in the country after a tourist or resident visa has expired
3. Failing to obtain an identity card after receiving a resident visa (excluding minors), or failing to report a change of address to the government

Repeat offenders are subject to fines. Illegal workers may be fined 1–50 times the sueldo vital (equivalent to 22.3% of Chile's minimum wage), while those who overstay their visa or fail to obtain proper documentation may be fined 1–20 times the sueldo vital. Transportation companies bringing undocumented workers into Chile illegally can be fined 1–20 times the sueldo vital per person transported, and employers hiring undocumented workers may be fined 1–40 times the sueldo vital per worker. Owners or managers of hotels and residences providing lodging to undocumented immigrants can also be fined 1–20 times the sueldo vital per person.

=== Legalization ===
The tourist visa, commonly used by immigrants who later become undocumented, expires after 90 days.

In 2015, Chile's foreign affairs department introduced a new visa category. Previously, the Visa Sujeta a Contrato was the only labor visa available, requiring a signed labor contract for temporary residency that expired with the contract. Employers were also required to pay for the migrant's return transportation to their home country. The new Visa por Motivos Laborales, implemented on February 15, also requires a labor contract but does not mandate employer-paid return travel. It allows workers to change employers without notifying the government and is valid for one year, during which holders can apply for permanent residency.

Those without a labor contract may apply for the Visa Temporaria. Eligibility requirements include:

- Having family relations in Chile requiring assistance
- Working as a clergyman with a religious order in the country
- Being retired and planning to stay in Chile for more than 90 days
- Developing a business project
- Having professional obligations
- Giving birth in Chile

Peruvians, Dominicans, and Colombians must also provide criminal history documentation to obtain any visa. Visa fees vary by type and the applicant's nationality.

Visa costs in Chile by nationality
| Nation of origin | Visa Temporaria (USD) | Visa Sujeta a Contrato (USD) |
|---|---|---|
| Bolivia | 283 | 300 |
| Colombia | 180 | 295 |
| Dominican Republic | 90 | 90 |
| Germany | 75 | 75 |
| Haiti | 25 | 25 |
| Peru | 80 | 80 |
| People's Republic of China | 152 | 152 |
| United States of America | 470 | 580 |

The MERCOSUR visa, established through an agreement among Bolivia, Argentina, Brazil, Paraguay, Uruguay, and Chile, allows nationals of these countries to reside in Chile for one year with only a valid passport and a clean criminal record.

=== Living conditions of undocumented immigrants ===
According to a 2006 CASEN survey analysis, undocumented immigrants in Chile experience more deprived socioeconomic conditions than legal immigrants and tend to have poorer health outcomes. A significant proportion of immigrants overall lack health insurance, with undocumented immigrants particularly affected due to their lack of work authorization.

==== Housing ====
Housing options for Peruvian migrants are limited by financial constraints, lack of paperwork, and, in some cases, ethnic discrimination. A 2003 survey in Santiago, where 20% of participants were undocumented, found that urban immigrants typically live in collective housing with approximately 3.2 permanent residents per room. These rooms average 12 square meters and serve as multifunctional spaces for sleeping, cooking, eating, and socializing. While most migrants in the study owned a stove and television, few had a refrigerator or washing machine. Many residences also lack heating.

In Antofagasta, approximately 15% of the large and rapidly growing immigrant population is undocumented. The region is prone to natural disasters such as landslides, including a 1991 event that killed 92 people. In these informal settlements, residents typically build their own houses using wood purchased from local vendors. They improvise electrical installations by hanging cords from wooden poles and receive water deliveries by truck once a week.

==== Education ====
The Chilean government has increased subsidies to regions with large immigrant populations in response to demographic changes. One resulting initiative is a basic education program in Santiago that registered over one thousand undocumented immigrant students within a year. Karen Rojo, mayor of Antofagasta since 2012, has stated that the municipal government provides public education to all children, including those without legal status. However, many undocumented immigrants leave their children in their home countries, as their primary focus is earning money for subsistence or remittances rather than education.

Despite these measures, significant disparities persist between the rights and services available to migrants versus Chilean nationals. This gap is particularly evident for Haitian immigrants, who constitute approximately 11.4% of Chile's immigrant population—the largest non-Latin American demographic. Although Haitian children have access to public schools, they face substantial barriers to educational equity, including Spanish language proficiency challenges and low levels of social and cultural integration within the school system.

== Results ==
=== Political responses in Chile ===
==== Pro-immigration ====
Former President Michelle Bachelet advocated for greater immigrant equality, recognizing their economic and cultural contributions. In January 2017, she proposed legislation to replace the 1975 Immigration Law that would guarantee undocumented immigrants access to healthcare, education, social security, and labor justice. The proposed law would also ease entry restrictions, decriminalize undocumented immigration, and allow immigrants to appeal deportation orders. Under the current 1975 law, deportation decisions are made exclusively by the Ministry of the Interior and Public Security. Bachelet's proposal was not approved during the January 2017 legislative session, leaving the 1975 law intact.

The Party for Democracy remains the only Chilean political party with a dedicated Secretary of Migration and Refugees. The party supports relaxing visa restrictions, challenges anti-immigrant stigma, and promotes "interculturality" as a social value.

==== Anti-immigration ====
Former President Sebastián Piñera introduced legislation during his administration to replace the 1975 immigration law. The proposed measures would have tightened entry restrictions and streamlined expulsion procedures, but failed to gain approval in the Congress.

The Chile Vamos coalition has been particularly vocal in advocating for more restrictive immigration policies. The party established a commission focused on enhancing immigration control, primarily targeting immigrants with criminal records. Legislators from the National Renewal and Independent Democratic Union parties have similarly proposed tougher immigration legislation. In late 2016, Piñera endorsed these efforts, attributing rising crime rates to undocumented immigrants. Other anti-immigration advocates have cited increased public spending and unemployment as justification for stricter laws, emphasizing the challenges already facing Chilean-born citizens living in poverty. Waldo Mora, who served as Intendente of Antofagasta from 2013 to 2014, has accused undocumented immigrants of spreading HIV and tuberculosis in the region.

=== Public reactions ===
Chilean public opinion toward Peruvian immigration is mixed. Most concerns appear to be economically motivated rather than based on racial or nationalistic prejudice. In one survey, 55.6% of Chilean participants disagreed that "if Peruvians get too mixed with Chileans, the quality of our people will worsen," and 56.2% disagreed that "Peruvian immigrants that come to our country are more likely to commit crimes." However, 69.4% agreed that "although Peruvians need employment, Chilean entrepreneurs should always prefer Chileans."

==== Pro-migrant organizations and actions ====
Religious organizations in Chile have actively promoted migrant integration. The Instituto Católico Chileno de Migración (INCAMI) maintains offices nationwide and specifically assists undocumented immigrants in obtaining legal documentation. The organization also provides housing and healthcare support, facilitates cultural assimilation, and raises public awareness. The Servicio Jesuita a Migrantes (SJM) operates through three main areas: insertion, reflection, and advocacy. "Insertion" involves direct work with migrants—learning their stories, living conditions, needs, and rights violations. "Reflection" examines the structural causes of migration, including political, social, economic, and cultural factors. "Advocacy" uses these insights to influence public opinion and promote better laws and public policies. SJM's insertion work includes Spanish courses for Haitians, along with educational, social, legal, and employment support. SJM's "Infancia sin Condiciones" ("Unconditional Childhood") campaign offers immigrant children free summer educational programs in Valparaíso. The curriculum addresses race, discrimination, and immigration, and is open to children regardless of migratory status.

Undocumented immigrants organized a march in Santiago in 2014 demanding legalization, followed by another demonstration in January 2017 coordinated by the Coordinadora Nacional de Immigrantes.

==== Anti-migrant sentiment ====
The right-wing movement Acción Identitaria has expressed concerns about preserving national identity, values, and security, warning against potential cultural and physical threats posed by immigration.

Antofagasta's substantial immigrant population has generated tensions with native Chileans, particularly due to associations between undocumented immigrants and public health concerns or drug trafficking. These tensions escalated in October 2013 following Colombia's defeat by Chile in a 2014 FIFA World Cup qualifying match. Street celebrations by Colombian immigrants led to verbal confrontations with Chileans that continued through the night. One week later, Chilean residents organized a march under the slogan "Recuperemos Antofagasta" ("Take Back Antofagasta"). The private organization Antofa Segura has continued campaigns against undocumented immigrants in the region, aiming to reduce delinquency.

However, anti-immigrant sentiment is not unanimous in Antofagasta. In the 2016 municipal elections, independent candidate Karen Rojo defeated the Chile Vamos anti-immigrant candidate by a 3% margin. Rojo has demonstrated support for immigrant communities by providing public services regardless of legal status. In response to the 2013 unrest, she established a "multicultural board" comprising the Office of the Public Defender (Defensoría Penal Pública), the Investigative Police (PDI), municipal leaders, and social organizations to address discrimination in the region.
