= Frente Amplio (Chilean political party) =

Political party in Chile

- Abbreviation: FA
- Leader: Gabriel Boric
- President: Constanza Martínez
- Secretary-General: Andrés Couble
- Founder: Gabriel Boric
- Founded: 19 April 2024
- Registered: 1 July 2024
- Merger of: Social Convergence; Democratic Revolution; Comunes; Socialist Platform
- Preceded by: Frente Amplio (coalition)
- Headquarters: Santiago de Chile
- Membership (2026): 56,005 (1st)
- Ideology: Democratic socialism Left-wing populism Radical democracy
- Political position: Left-wing
- National affiliation: Government Alliance
- Regional affiliation: São Paulo Forum
- Colours: Celeste
- Chamber of Deputies: 17 / 155
- Senate: 2 / 50
- Mayors: 13 / 345

Website
- frenteampliochile.cl

The Frente Amplio (Spanish for Broad Front, FA) is a Chilean left-wing political party, founded in 2024 as a result of the merger of the former coalition of the same name.

== Platform and ideology ==
The Frente Amplio was formed as a result of the merger of left-wing political parties that aimed to change the political situation of Chile in favor of participative democracy, democratic socialism and feminism.

Some reports consider their ideology close to populism due to the fact that the coalition was built off of existing popular movements (such as the 2011 student movement).

Although it has the same name as the center-left coalition from Uruguay, political analysts tend to see the Frente Amplio as more similar to the Spanish left-wing populist party Podemos. 2017 presidential primary candidate Alberto Mayol highlighted the fact that a clear "leftist tradition" exists in most of the coalition members.

Although after Gabriel Boric won the 2021 general election, his government adopted more moderate positions on several issues, mainly due to a Congress without clear majorities and the inclusion of the center-left Democratic Socialism coalition in his cabinet.

== History ==
On March 11, 2022, the FA became part of the ruling alliance, with Gabriel Boric as the president. The first cabinet of ministers appointed by President Boric had a large presence of the bloc in eight portfolios, among them the General Secretariat of the Presidency, with Giorgio Jackson (RD); and in Women and Gender Equity, with Antonia Orellana (CS), both belonging to La Moneda's political committee.

On October 5, 2023, the Frente Amplio began the process of merging its member parties to form a single political collective. RD and CS called for a referendum on March 9 and 10, where the members were consulted on their approval or rejection of the merger. A little more than 10 thousand people participated in the process, 16% of the militancy of the two formations registered to the electoral service, and voted in favor of the merger by more than 80%. Comunes did not participate in the consultation due to the dissolution process it was facing at that time before the Court of Appeals. With the merger, the single party of the FA will be the group with the most members in Chile, with 62 thousand registered people.

The deed of incorporation of the merger of CS and RD was signed on 19 April 2024, and on May 13 of the same year, Servel ordered the publication of the extract of said document, initiating the formal process of creation of the new party. On July 1, Servel confirmed the merger between CS and RD and the constitution of the new Frente Amplio party.

== Presidential candidates ==
The following is a list of the presidential candidates supported by the Frente Amplio.

- 2025: Jeannette Jara (lost)

== Election results ==
=== Congress election ===
Election year	Chamber of Deputies				Senate			
Election year	# Votes	% Votes	Seats	+/–	# Votes	% Votes	Seats	+/–
2025	807,731	7.54%	17 / 155	▼6	155,053	5.00%	2 / 50	▲2
