= Republican Party of Chile =

Republican Party of Chile Partido Republicano de Chile
- Abbreviation: PRCh
- President: Arturo Squella
- General Secretary: Ruth Hurtado
- Vice Presidents: 1st Tomás Bengolea López; 2nd María Gatica Gajardo; 3rd José Carlos Meza; 4th Romina Cifuentes González; 5th Luis Silva Irarrázaval; 6th Catalina Ugarte Millán
- Founder: José Antonio Kast
- Founded: 10 June 2019
- Legalized: 21 January 2020
- Split from: Independent Democratic Union
- Preceded by: Republican Action
- Headquarters: Presidente Errázuriz 4305, Las Condes
- Think tank: Republican Ideas
- Student wing: Student Action
- Youth wing: Republican Party Youth
- Membership (2026): 23,177 (11th)
- Ideology: National conservatism; Economic liberalism; Right-wing populism; Pinochetism; Guildism
- Political position: Far-right (Note: Several media outlets, institutions, and research papers that identify the Republican Party of Chile as a far-right political party include: Chilean media and institutions: El Mercurio, Diario Financiero, La Tercera, Como tienda, se han mostrado negacionistas del cambio climático. EMOL, Radio Bío-Bío, Centro de Estudios Públicos, CNN Chile, El Mostrador, El Desconcierto, The Clinic, Ciper, El Ciudadano, and Radio Universidad de Chile.; International media: The Washington Post, BBC, elDiario.es, El País, El Mundo, Euronews, Europa Press, El Salto, Público, Ara, and La Vanguardia.; Research papers: El Partido Republicano: el proyecto populista de la derecha radical chilena, by Consuelo Campos Campos, Revista uruguaya de Ciencia Política (2021), and The arrival of the populist radical right in Chile: José Antonio Kast and the "Partido Republicano", by Camila Díaz, Cristóbal Rovira Kaltwasser, and Lisa Zanotti, Journal of language and politics.)
- National affiliation: Christian Social Front (2021–2022); Change for Chile (since 2025)
- Colors: Chilean national colors: Blue; White; Red
- Chamber of Deputies: 31 / 155
- Senate: 5 / 50
- Communal Councils: 234 / 2,252
- Regional Councils: 60 / 302
- Mayors: 8 / 345
- Regional Governors: 0 / 16

Election symbol

Website
- partidorepublicanodechile.cl

The Republican Party of Chile (Spanish: Partido Republicano de Chile, officially abbreviated as PRCh, (Note: Formerly PLR, until circa 2024.) and commonly abbreviated in the media as REP or, less frequently, PRep) is a right winged and conservative political party founded in Chile in 2019 by José Antonio Kast, who led the party until his resignation in 2026 following his inauguration as president of Chile.

The party is socially conservative and in favor of a liberal social market economy. The party opposes abortion, euthanasia, same-sex marriage, proposals for a new Chilean constitution, and advocates a tough approach to law and order, gang violence, political corruption and illegal immigration into Chile. Economically, it advocates a largely free-market economy with strong protections for private property, low taxes, lower government spending, and incentives for entrepreneurship, however it also embraces a social market economy.

The party gained visibility during the political upheavals that followed the 2019 Social Outburst and the subsequent constitutional reform process, initially operating from a position of disadvantage within the Chilean right. Kast placed first in the initial round of the 2021 general election, building on a limited but defined electoral base and securing approximately 28 percent of the vote.

In the 2023 Constitutional Council elections, the Republicans won the largest share of seats of any political group and played a leading role in drafting a proposed new constitution of Chile which was rejected in a referendum in December 2023. Kast led polls for the presidential run-off in the 2025 Chilean general election, and won the presidency on 14 December 2025.

== History ==
=== Background ===
José Antonio Kast, the founder of the party, was a deputy for 16 years, and a member of the Independent Democratic Union (UDI) for 20 years. In 2017 he ran for president, finishing in fourth place with nearly 8% of the vote.

Kast became disillusioned with UDI and resigned in protest, believing that the party criticized former Chilean dictator Augusto Pinochet too often.

With the base of support he obtained with the election, he decided to found a political movement.

=== Foundation ===
The Republican Party began as the Chilean manifestation of the conservative wave in Latin America. On 3 March 2018, Kast held the first meeting of (what at that time was) the new movement. Some time after, on 9 April, the movement was presented at the Omnium Hall in Las Condes, and it was named "Acción Republicana" (Republican Action).

On 10 June 2019, Kast presented the party to the Servel, the party formation is still ongoing. More than half of the directive is composed of ex members of the UDI. One of them is the only deputy the party has in the Chamber of Deputies, Ignacio Urrutia.

On 21 January 2020, the Servel legally constituted the party in the regions of O'Higgins, Maule and Ñuble, after the necessary number of signatures was presented.

On 14 August 2020, the party was officially constituted in the regions of Biobío and Araucanía, at the same time violent incidents related with the Mapuche conflict were taking place in the zone.

On 9 September, the party was constituted in Santiago Metropolitan Region, and it was announced that it would present candidates to the municipal elections. On 19 July 2021, the party was constituted in the regions of Arica and Parinacota, Atacama, Aysén and Magallanes, making it a national-level party, constituted in all Chilean regions.

=== Beginnings: 2019–2021 ===
Following the social unrest that began in late 2019, Republicans entered the political arena from a position of disadvantage, operating outside the main center-right coalition, Chile Vamos, and with limited institutional representation.

During the 2020 constitutional referendum, the party actively campaigned for the «Reject» option, which obtained approximately 22% of the vote nationwide. Although this result confirmed the minority status of its position at the time, it nonetheless provided a clearly defined electoral base amid a highly polarized political environment.

After that, the party focused on consolidating this support, articulating a platform centered on law and order, opposition to the constitutional process, and socially conservative principles. This strategy proved electorally consequential during the 2021 general election, when Kast secured roughly 28% of the vote in the first round of the presidential election.

Observers noted that this outcome reflected the party's ability to expand beyond its initial plebiscitary base, transforming an early minority position into a competitive electoral force within the Chilean right.

=== Constitutional referendums: 2022–2023 ===
2023 saw the party win a landslide victory in the Constitutional Council election of May. In December, after the defeat in the constitutional referendum, 26 members including senator Rojo Edwards renounced the party.

In January 2024 Deputy Johannes Kaiser renounced after being sanctioned being removed from legislative committees for making explicit that he voted "Against" the Constitutional Proposal of 2023, supported by the party directive. He emphasizes that he wasn't going to participate in any campaign for his option for respect for the party, something which he accomplished. He founded the National Libertarian Party in July of the same year, having the signatures required in 2025 to officially create the new political party.

=== Rise within the Chilean right: 2024–2025 ===
Following the defeat in the 2023 referendum, Republicans faced a more demanding scenario within the Chilean right, where it was reopened a political space for the traditional center-right (Chile Vamos). In this context, the party shifted from a phase of rapid ascent to a more conventional stage of electoral competition.

During the 2024 municipal and regional elections, Republicans competed directly for the same electorate as Chile Vamos, particularly in urban municipalities and middle-class sectors. The results were uneven, with localized advances but without systematically displacing traditional parties at the territorial level, highlighting the limits of the party's expansion outside highly polarized political environments.

Within this framework, programmatic ambiguities and communication missteps by Evelyn Matthei's candidacy during the first half of 2025 contributed to strengthening the Republican's relative position among right-wing voters. Analysts noted that these hesitations facilitated Republican consolidation among voters seeking a clearer alternative in terms of leadership and political positioning. By June 2025, the party had established itself as a competitive actor within the sector, amid fragmentation and open competition on the Chilean right.

== Ideology ==
Political scientist Cristóbal Rovira categorizes the party as belonging to a populist radical right, rather than far-right which is, in their view, academically an incorrect label for the party, because it is not opposed to the democratic system per se, but rather seeks "illiberal democracy."

According to Political scientist Mireya Dávila the party contain some positions typical of the far-right, a characterization that has led certain media outlets to frame it as such, despite that specialists have rejected or avoiding using that label.

The party's ideological doctrine is similar to the previously existing Guildism and is the main group of "organic Pinochetism", with the party receiving more support as centre-left and centre-right parties began to reach a point of political convergence in the area policies and a perceived collusion in corruption as scandals arose. According to Cox and Blanco, the Republican Party appeared in Chilean politics in a similar manner to Spain's Vox party, with both parties splitting off from an existing right-wing party to collect disillusioned voters. The Republican Party calls for measures to reduce illegal immigration, including building a ditch along the border with Bolivia.

The party described 2019 protests in Chile as a criminal outbreak. Regarding economic policy, the party supports a social market economy, including cutting taxes.

The Republican Party holds socially conservative views of a traditional society and according to traditional Western Christian point of view, supporting a heterosexual nuclear family while opposing abortion and assisted suicide. Members of the party have also expressed criticism to feminist attitudes.

== Presidential candidates ==
The following is a list of the presidential candidates supported by the Republican Party (information gathered from the Archive of Chilean Elections):

- 2021 – José Antonio Kast (lost)
- 2025 – José Antonio Kast (won)

== Election results ==
=== Presidential elections ===
Election year	Candidate	1st Round		2nd Round		Results
Election year	Candidate	# Votes	% Votes	# Votes	% Votes	Results
2021	José Antonio Kast	1,961,779	27.9%	3,650,088	44.1%	Lost
2025	José Antonio Kast	3,092,946	23.93%	7,243,612	58.17%	Won

=== Congress elections ===
Election year	Chamber of Deputies			Senate			Status
Election year	# Votes	% Votes	Seats	# Votes	% Votes	Seats	Status
2021	666,726	10.54%	14 / 155	336,305	7.22%	1 / 50	Opposition
2025	1,424,832	13.29%	31 / 155	534,981	17.27%	5 / 50	Government

=== Municipal elections ===
Election year	Councillors			Mayors		
Election year	# Votes	% Votes	Seats	# Votes	% Votes	Seats
2021	188,542	3.09%	12 / 2,252	83,237	1.31%	0 / 345
2024	1,422,032	13.81%	233 / 2,256	489,416	4.18%	8 / 345

=== Regional elections ===
Election year	Regional Councillors			Governors		
Election year	# Votes	% Votes	Seats	# Votes	% Votes	Seats
2024	1,528,563	15.70%	60 / 302	1,493,090	13.84%	0 / 16
