= Carlos Maldonado Curti =

Chilean politician and lawyer

Carlos Maldonado
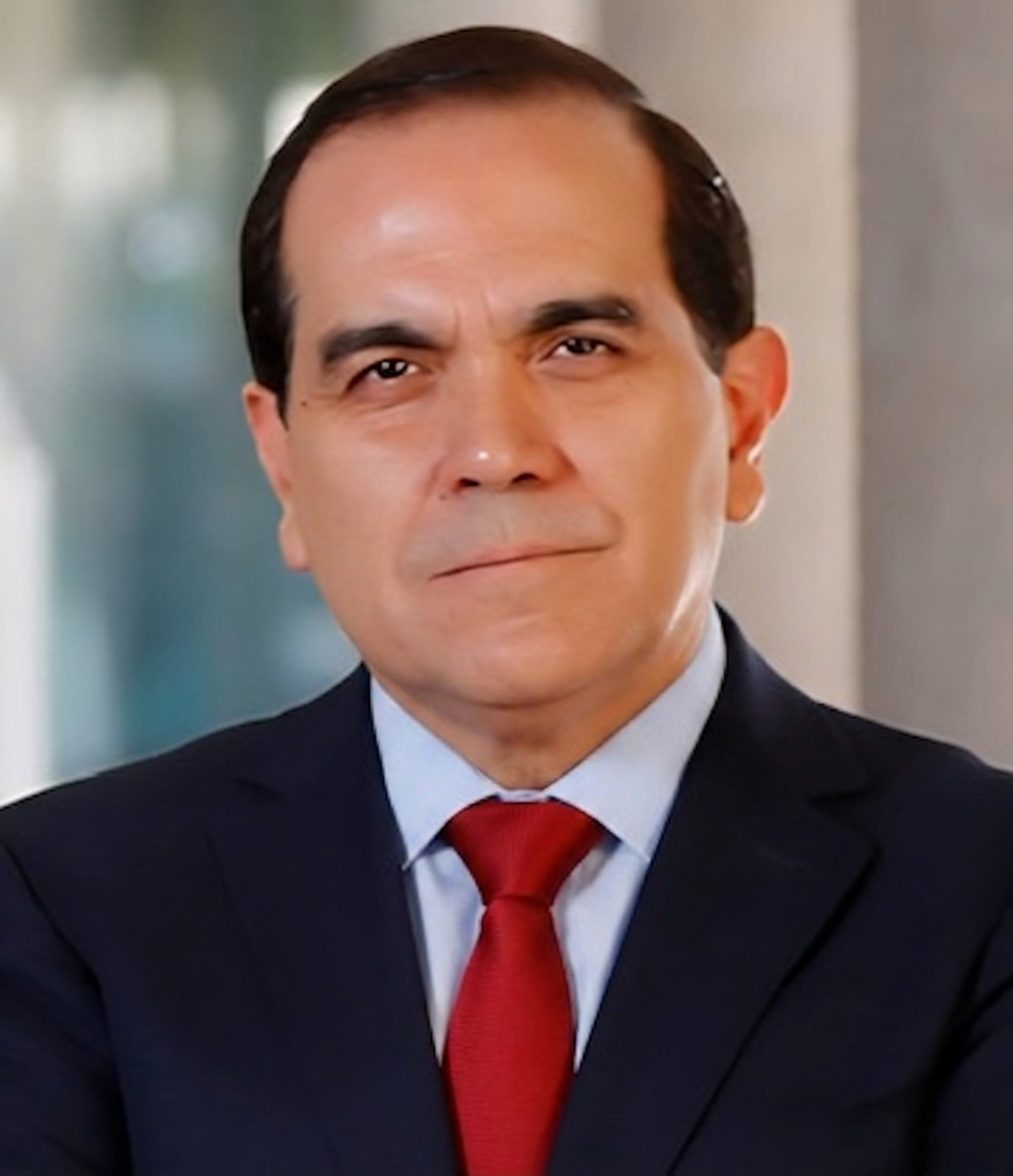

Member of the BancoEstado's Board of Directors
- Incumbent
- Assumed office 16 April 2026
- President: José Antonio Kast

President of the Radical Party
- In office 27 August 2018 – 23 November 2021
- Preceded by: Ernesto Velasco
- Succeeded by: Alberto Robles

Minister of Justice
- In office 27 March 2007 – 11 March 2010
- President: Michelle Bachelet
- Preceded by: Isidro Solís
- Succeeded by: Felipe Bulnes

Undersecretary of Justice
- In office 11 March 2006 – 27 March 2007
- Preceded by: Jorge Navarrete Poblete
- Succeeded by: Augusto Prado Sánchez

Personal details
- Born: 21 July 1963 (age 63) Valparaíso, Chile
- Party: Radical Party (1983–1994; 2018–2022); Radical Social Democrat Party (1994–2018); Democrats (2022–2025)
- Spouse: Cecilia Cancino Reyes
- Children: Three
- Education: University of Valparaíso (LL.B); University of Chile (LL.M)
- Occupation: Politician
- Profession: Lawyer

Carlos Domingo Maldonado Curti (born 21 July 1963) is a Chilean politician and lawyer. He was a member of the Radical Party and is currently linked to Freemasonry.

Maldonado was General Undersecretary of Government (2006–07) Minister of Justice (2007–10) during the first government of President Michelle Bachelet.

He was pre-candidate of the Radical Party of Chile (PR). Later, on 2 September 2022, he was suspended from the PR for having promoted the «Reject» option towards the 2022 Chilean constitutional plebiscite, which won 62%–38%.

== Biography ==
He spent his childhood and youth in Cerro Jiménez in Valparaíso, the son of Carmela Georgina Curti Valdivia. His father, Carlos Manfredo Maldonado Rojas, a former Radical leader, retired as an employee of the Empresa de los Ferrocarriles del Estado (EFE), the same company where his grandfather had worked as a laborer.

He completed his primary and secondary education at School E-310 and the Eduardo de la Barra High School, respectively. Later, he studied law at the Law School of the University of Valparaíso, beginning in 1980, and between 1994 and 1995 he completed a master's degree in law at the Graduate School of the University of Chile.

In addition, he has attended various seminars, both nationally and internationally, in the areas of Justice Reform, the concept of the Rule of Law, Communications, Administration, Human Resources, Information Technologies, among other subjects.

In 1994, he moved to Santiago where, together with a group of fellow lawyers, he rented an office on Amunátegui Street. After participating in several Concertación governments, in 2010 Maldonado returned to work as a lawyer, dedicating himself to providing consultancy in Mexico (where he lived for six years) in the development of procedural reforms in Latin America and the operation of concession-run prisons.

In a presidential debate, he was asked about his fortune, estimated at 1.5 billion pesos, which he accumulated through these consultancies. He currently owns two firms: Inversiones La Condesa Limitada and Servicios y Proyectos Público Privados S.A.

He has been married twice. In his first marriage, contracted in 1986 with Lilian Jeanette Mendoza Tronche, he had two daughters. Later, he had a third daughter with Denisse Ester Brito Gálvez, with whom he maintained a relationship for five years. Lilian and Carlos divorced in 2014. His second and current wife, Cecilia Cancino Reyes, already had two daughters.

Maldonado is a passionate fan of soccer, and a supporter of the club from his native community, Santiago Wanderers.

== Political career ==
=== Beginnings ===
Like his father, he became a member of the Radical Party (PR) at the age of twenty, while studying at university. By the late 1980s, he became president of the Radical Youth of the Valparaíso Region.

After the 1989 parliamentary elections, he received a call from senator-elect Carlos González Márquez, also a Radical, who offered him the position of his chief of staff. There, he coordinated the legislative and territorial work of the parliamentarian, who failed to be reelected in the 1993 elections.

=== Concertación governments ===
In 1994, he joined the new Social Democratic Radical Party (PRSD), formed by the merger of the PR and Chilean Social Democracy Party.

During the government of Eduardo Frei Ruiz-Tagle, he joined the Undersecretariat of Justice of Chile as chief of staff, first under Eduardo Jara and later under José Antonio Gómez. He remained in this position until the beginning of the Government of Ricardo Lagos in 2000. In those years, Maldonado cultivated close ties with Gómez, who was regarded by many as his "political godfather."

During José Antonio Gómez's tenure as Minister of Justice, he became executive secretary of the National Coordination Commission for the Criminal Procedure Reform. In other words, he led the process that changed the inquisitorial system of justice, which was first implemented as a pilot in the regions of Coquimbo and La Araucanía, and nationally in June 2005.

In 2006, he assumed the position of Undersecretary General of Government in the first government of Michelle Bachelet. Thus, he became the first Radical in decades to hold a government post in the La Moneda Palace. Almost exactly a year later, she herself appointed him Minister of Justice, remaining in the position until the end of her government in 2010.

=== Leader of the Radical Party ===
After living in Mexico for six years, in 2016 he joined the PR team supporting the presidential candidacy of Alejandro Guillier. Although the journalist was not a Radical member, due to his Masonic ties he became the party's candidate. In fact, Guillier had been elected senator thanks to the seat ceded by José Antonio Gómez Urrutia. Maldonado became one of his political advisers.

On 21 August 2018, he was appointed president of the Radical Party, defeating Ernesto Velasco Rodríguez, who was seeking reelection.

In 2021, he registered as a presidential pre-candidate representing his party, with the aim of participating in the citizen primaries of the Constituent Unity coalition. He competed against Yasna Provoste of the Christian Democratic Party and Paula Narváez of the Socialist Party. In the election, held on 21 August 2021, Provoste emerged victorious. On 23 November of that year, he resigned from the presidency of the Radical Party—after the presidential election—and was succeeded by Alberto Robles.
