= Liceo José Victorino Lastarria =

Liceo José Victorino Lastarria (Spanish for: José Victorino Lastarria High School) may refer to:

- Liceo José Victorino Lastarria (Rancagua), Chile
- Liceo José Victorino Lastarria (Santiago), Chile
