= Ernesto Velasco =

Chilean politician (born 1963)

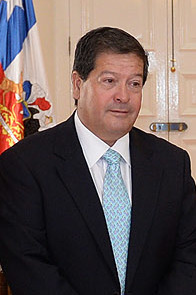

President of the Radical Social Democratic Party
- In office 9 June 2014 – 27 August 2018
- Preceded by: José Antonio Gómez
- Succeeded by: Carlos Maldonado Curti

Intendant of the Metropolitan Region of Santiago
- In office 28 May 1998 – 13 March 2000
- Preceded by: Germán Quintana
- Succeeded by: Sergio Galilea

Personal details
- Born: 13 September 1963 (age 63) La Serena, Chile
- Party: Radical Party (1983–1994; 2018–); Radical Social Democrat Party (1994–2018)
- Spouse: Mireya Pacareu
- Children: Three
- Education: University of La Serena
- Occupation: Politician
- Profession: Teacher of History and Geography

Ernesto Leonardo Velasco Rodríguez (born 13 September 1963) is a Chilean politician and teacher of History and Geography.

He was president of the Radical Social Democrat Party from 2014 to 2018. On 24 August 2015, he joined with Li Baorong, Ambassador of China in Chile during the second government of Michelle Bachelet (2014–2018).
