= Álex Figueroa =

Chilean politician and physician

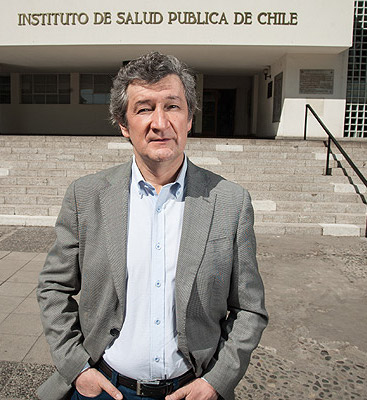

Minister of Health
- In office 7 August 1996 – 11 March 2000
- President: Eduardo Frei Ruíz-Tagle
- Preceded by: Carlos Massad
- Succeeded by: Michelle Bachelet

Intendant of the Santiago Metropolitan Region
- In office 14 September 1994 – 7 August 1996
- President: Eduardo Frei Ruíz-Tagle
- Preceded by: Fernando Castillo Velasco
- Succeeded by: Germán Quintana

President of the Pontifical Catholic University of Chile Students Federation
- In office 1986–1987
- Preceded by: Tomás Jocelyn-Holt
- Succeeded by: Patricio Zapata

Personal details
- Born: 20 September 1961 Santiago, Chile
- Died: 25 December 2018 (aged 57) Santiago, Chile
- Party: Christian Democratic Party (1980s–2018)
- Spouse: Myriam Marcela Villarroel Encina (1998 - 2008)
- Children: Three
- Parent(s): Juan Figueroa; Gabriela Muñoz
- Education: Pontifical Catholic University of Chile (B.Sc); Polytechnic University of Catalonia (M.Sc)
- Occupation: Politician
- Profession: Physician

Álex Adolfo Figueroa Muñoz (20 September 1961 – 25 December 2018) was a Chilean politician and physician who served as Minister of Health (1996–2000).

== Biography ==
He spent his childhood in the Santiago neighborhoods of Estación Central and Tocornal, where his maternal grandparents lived. His father, Juan Figueroa, was a factory worker, and his mother, Gabriela Muñoz, was a homemaker.

He attended the Liceo José Victorino Lastarria, Santiago and later earned his medical degree from the Pontifical Catholic University of Chile. He subsequently obtained a master's degree in ergonomics from the Polytechnic University of Catalonia, Spain, as well as a postgraduate diploma in internal medicine from the University of Chile Faculty of Medicine.

== Political career ==
While studying at the Pontifical Catholic University of Chile, he served as president of the Medical Students' Association. During the same period, he was also a student representative to the Federation of Students of the Pontifical Catholic University of Chile (FEUC), serving as its president in 1987. After completing his studies, he helped draft the health policy platform of presidential candidate Patricio Aylwin in 1989.

In 1990, following the election of Eduardo Frei Ruiz-Tagle as president of the Christian Democratic Party, Figueroa was appointed national undersecretary of the party by Genaro Arriagada. When both leaders stepped down from the party leadership to focus on Frei's 1993 presidential campaign, Figueroa was promoted to national secretary.

In 1994, he succeeded Fernando Castillo Velasco as Intendant of the Santiago Metropolitan Region. Two years later, he was appointed Minister of Health, serving until the end of Frei's administration. In 2001, he unsuccessfully ran for a seat in the Chamber of Deputies of Chile, representing the Santiago Centro district.

In 2007, he became rector of the Universidad Bolivariana de Chile. In 2012, he was appointed dean of the Faculty of Health and Physical Activity Sciences at the SEK International University Chile. Beginning in August 2015, he served as director of the Institute of Public Health of Chile (ISP).

He died on 25 December 2018 from liver cancer.
