= Javiera Blanco =

Chilean politician

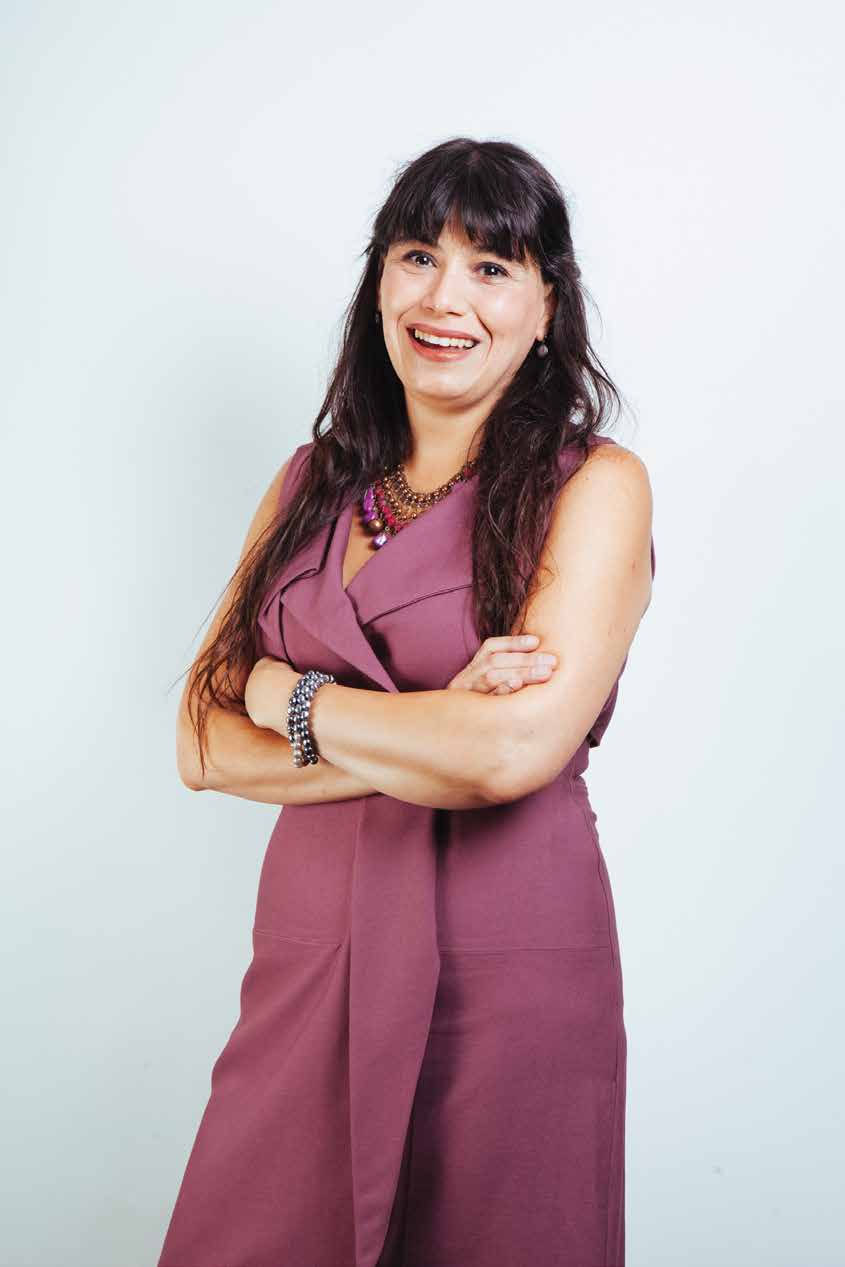

Minister of Justice and Human Rights
- In office 5 January 2016 – 19 October 2016
- President: Michelle Bachelet
- Preceded by: José Antonio Gómez
- Succeeded by: Jaime Campos

Minister of Justice
- In office 11 May 2015 – 5 January 2016
- President: Michelle Bachelet
- Preceded by: José Antonio Gómez
- Succeeded by: Dissolution of the charge

Minister of Labor
- In office 11 March 2014 – 15 May 2015
- President: Michelle Bachelet
- Preceded by: Juan Carlos Jobet
- Succeeded by: Ximena Rincón

Undersecretary of Carabineros
- In office 11 March 2006 – 10 March 2010
- President: Michelle Bachelet
- Preceded by: Marcelo Ortíz
- Succeeded by: Carol Bown

Personal details
- Born: 1 August 1972 (age 54) Santiago, Chile
- Party: Close to Christian Democratic Party
- Relatives: Carmen Frei (mother-in-law)
- Education: Pontifical Catholic University of Chile (LL.B)
- Occupation: Politician
- Profession: Lawyer

Mónica Javiera Blanco Suárez (born 1 August 1972) is a Chilean lawyer and politician. She was minister during the second government of Michelle Bachelet (2014−2018).

She served as Undersecretary of Carabineros during President Michelle Bachelet's first administration (2006–2010), and later as a cabinet minister during her second administration, holding the portfolios of Labor and Social Welfare (2014–2015) and Justice and Human Rights (2015–2016).

Blanco also served as a member of the State Defense Council of Chile (CDE) from 2017 to 2018.

== Early life ==
Blanco is the daughter of a Christian Democratic activist and dentist specializing in cell biology and genetics, and of a physician who later became a virologist. Her mother died in 1998 at the age of 52 from multiple myeloma, a form of bone marrow cancer. She began her primary education at Al Boylor College.

In 1973, when she was one year old, her family moved to the United States following the 1973 Chilean coup d'état. After returning to Chile, she attended Colegio Mariano de Schoenstatt.

She studied at the Faculty of Law of the Pontifical Catholic University of Chile between 1991 and 1996, qualifying as a lawyer in 1998. She subsequently earned a master's degree in public management and public policy from the Department of Industrial Engineering at the University of Chile (2002–2003). She also completed postgraduate diploma programmes in criminal procedure reform, trial advocacy and litigation at the Diego Portales University (1999), and in research methodology at the Faculty of Economics of the Pontifical Catholic University of Chile (1998).

Blanco has taught at a number of higher education institutions, including the Pontifical Catholic University of Chile, the University of Chile, the Alberto Hurtado University, the Adolfo Ibáñez University, the academy of the Investigations Police of Chile, and the Judicial Academy. She has also published academic work in Chilean and international journals on issues related to justice and public security.

In addition, she has undertaken international consulting work for the United Nations Development Programme (UNDP) and the Inter-American Development Bank (IDB) in countries including Panama, El Salvador, Uruguay, Guatemala, Honduras, and Mexico. She also promoted a crime analysis training programme for the Office of the Attorney General of Colombia.

She is married to Eugenio Ortega Frei, son of politicians Carmen Frei and Eugenio Ortega, and a former corporate affairs manager at the Canadian mining company Barrick Gold. The couple have two children.

== Political career ==
=== Paz Ciudadana and undersecretary ===
In 1998, Blanco joined the Paz Ciudadana Foundation as a researcher and was promoted to project manager in 2001. She also participated on three occasions in the United States Department of State's International Visitor Program between 2003 and 2011.

On 1 September 2006, President Michelle Bachelet appointed her Undersecretary of Carabineros during her first administration, making her the first woman to hold the office. In that role, she chaired the Executive Commission of the Chilean Government's International Cooperation Programme for Uniformed Police Forces (CECIPU) and served as executive secretary of the Latin American police cooperation initiative for Haiti. She remained in office until 11 March 2010, when Bachelet's term ended.

In 2010, Blanco was appointed executive director of the Paz Ciudadana Foundation. During her tenure, she served on a number of governmental advisory bodies between 2010 and 2013. She was a member of the Security Commission of the Institute of Engineers of Chile from 2011 to 2013, a member of the Judicial Forum between 2011 and 2012, and a member of the Security Policy Advisory Council of the Municipality of Peñalolén between 2005 and 2012.

=== Bachelet II (2014–2018) ===
On 11 July 2013, Blanco was named spokesperson for Michelle Bachelet's campaign in the 2013 Chilean presidential election, resigning from her position at the Paz Ciudadana Foundation. Following Bachelet's electoral victory, the president-elect announced on 24 January 2014 that Blanco would serve as Minister of Labor and Social Welfare in her second administration, which took office on 11 March 2014.

During her tenure, 14 bills were enacted into law, including legislation regulating domestic workers and measures ending the practice known as the "multi-RUT". She also promoted collective labour rights reforms through the "modernization of labour relations" bill, which was ultimately approved in 2016. In June 2014, she addressed the plenary session of the International Labour Conference, organized by the International Labour Organization (ILO) in Geneva, Switzerland.

Blanco left the Labour Ministry on 11 May 2015 as part of a cabinet reshuffle and was succeeded by Ximena Rincón. On the same day, she was appointed Minister of Justice, later Minister of Justice and Human Rights, replacing José Antonio Gómez, who moved to the Ministry of National Defense.

During her tenure at the ministry, nine bills were enacted into law, including legislation establishing the Undersecretariat of Human Rights. Between 2015 and 2016, she also assumed spokesperson duties for the Ministry General Secretariat of Government. She resigned as Minister of Justice on 19 October 2016.

=== State Defense Council (CDE) ===
Blanco was appointed a member of the State Defense Council of Chile (CDE), taking office on 1 February 2017. She served until October 2018, when she resigned from the body.
