= Jorge Tarud =

Chilean politician

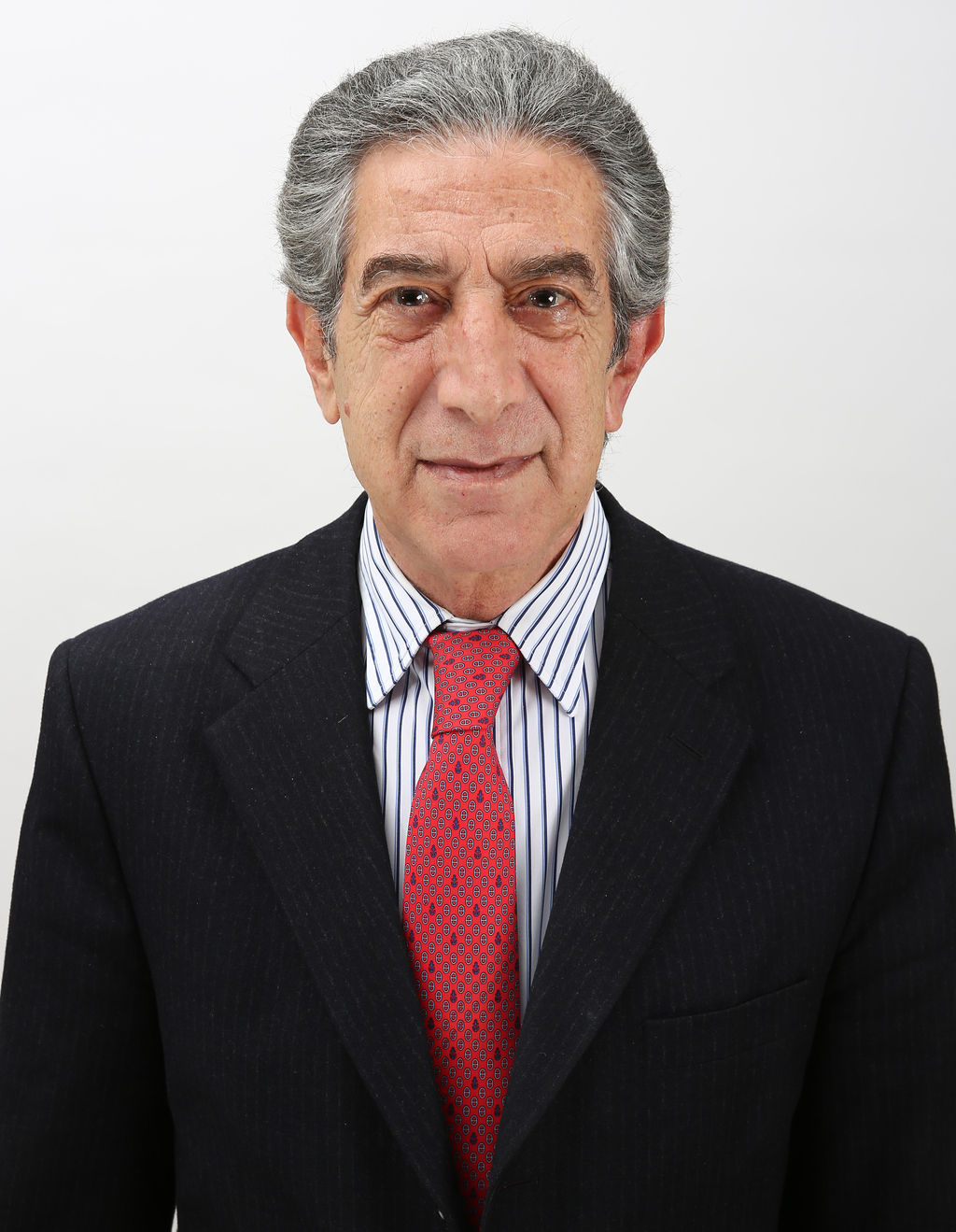

Ambassador of Chile to Belgium and Luxembourg
- Incumbent
- Assumed office 26 May 2026
- President: José Antonio Kast
- Preceded by: Gloria Navarrete

Member of the Chamber of Deputies
- In office 11 March 2002 – 11 March 2018
- Preceded by: Jaime Naranjo
- Succeeded by: District dissolved
- Constituency: 18th District

Ambassador of Chile in China
- In office 2000–2001
- Preceded by: Octavio Errázuriz
- Succeeded by: Pablo Cabrera Gaete

Ambassador of Chile in Australia
- In office 1994–2000

Ambassador of Chile in Saudi Arabia
- In office 1990–1994

Personal details
- Born: 19 July 1953 (age 73) Santiago, Chile
- Party: Democrats (2022–); Party for Democracy (1987–2022)
- Spouse: Dominique Kuborn Viselé
- Children: Jean-Paul Tarud Kuborn; Jean Christophe Tarud Kuborn
- Parent(s): Rafael Tarud; Hélène Daccaret
- Education: University of Chile (LL.B)
- Occupation: Politician
- Profession: Lawyer

Jorge Carlos Tarud Daccarett (born 19 July 1953) is a Chilean politician, militant from Party for Democracy (PPD). Since May 2026 he serves as Ambassador of Chile to Belgium and Luxembourg.

On 28 October 2020, he run into the primaries of his party for being presidential pre-candidate.

== Biography ==
Tarud was born on 19 July 1953 in Santiago, Chile. He is the son of Helene Daccarett Mobarec and Rafael Tarud, former senator for the Sixth Provincial Grouping, former Minister of State and presidential pre-candidate in the 1970 election.

On 17 March 1976, he married Dominique Kuborn Visele. He is the father of two children, Jean Paul and Christopher.

He completed his secondary education at the Liceo José Victorino Lastarria in Santiago, where he participated in the student center. After finishing school, he enrolled in law studies, from which he graduated.

== Political career ==
He is a founding member of the Party for Democracy (PPD), in which he has held leadership roles, particularly in the area of international affairs.

During the 1990s, he served as Ambassador of Chile to Saudi Arabia (1991), Australia and the People’s Republic of China, during the administrations of Presidents Patricio Aylwin, Eduardo Frei Ruiz-Tagle and Ricardo Lagos, respectively.

In the 1993 parliamentary elections, he ran for the Senate representing the PPD in the 11th Circumscription (Maule Region), but was not elected. In 2001, he was elected Deputy for District No. 39 with the highest vote share in the district, and was re-elected in 2005, 2009 and 2013.

In November 2017, he ran for the Senate representing the PPD in the new 9th Circumscription (Maule Region), but was not elected.

On 28 November 2020, he launched his pre-candidacy for the Presidency of the Republic, seeking to be nominated as the PPD candidate in the Convergencia Progresista primaries, a bloc composed of the PPD, PS and PRSD, but did not obtain the nomination.

In late October 2022, he resigned from the PPD and, on 2 November, together with former members of the Christian Democratic Party and other parties of the former Concertación and the 50+UNE movement, launched the Democrats Party, becoming its interim vice president.

On 26 May 2026, he was appointed by President José Antonio Kast as Ambassador of Chile to Belgium.
