= Fuad Chahín =

Chilean politician

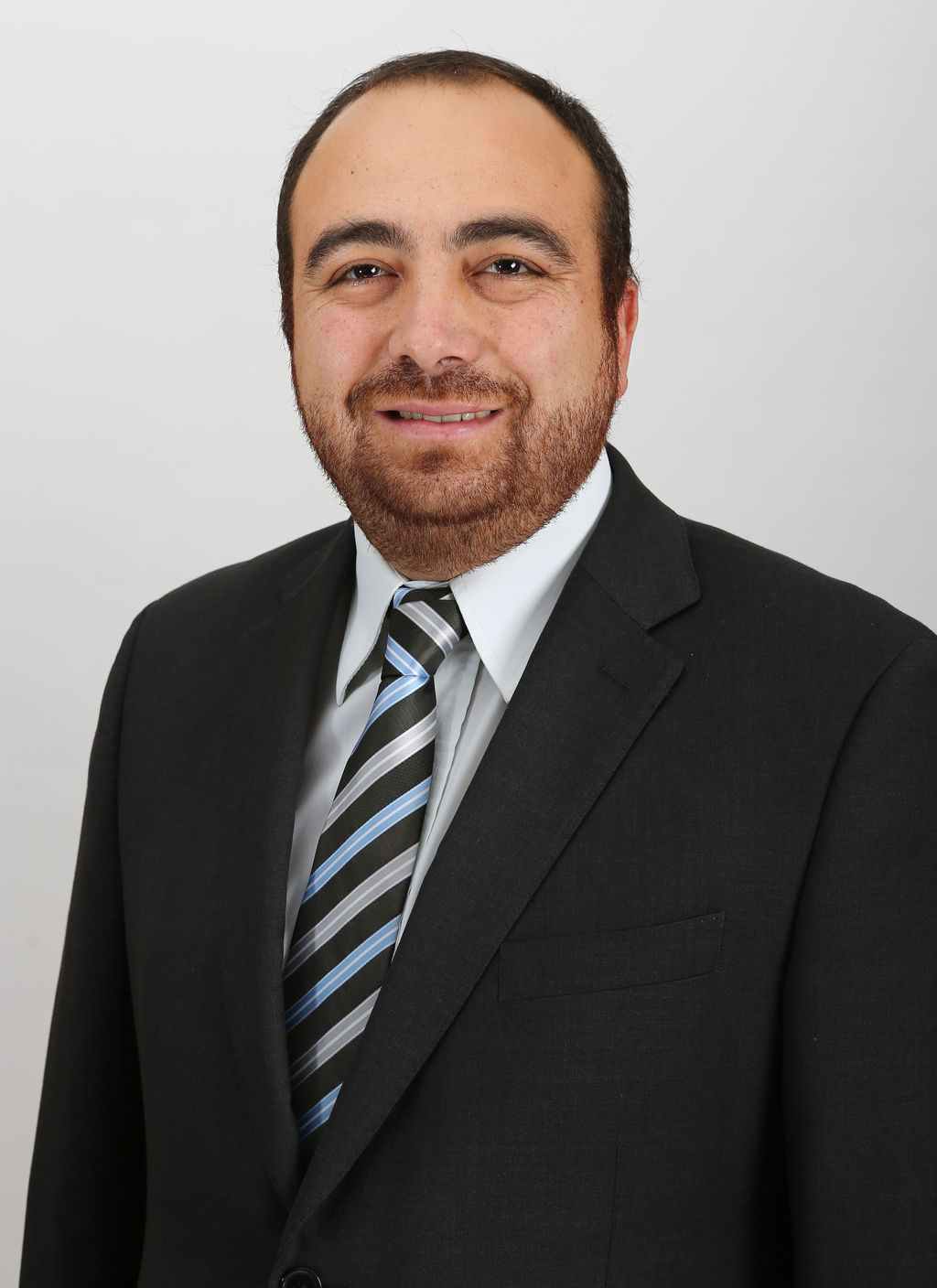

Member of the Constitutional Convention
- In office 4 July 2021 – 2 July 2022
- Constituency: 22nd District

President of the Christian Democratic Party
- In office 18 May 2018 – 27 May 2021
- Preceded by: Myriam Verdugo
- Succeeded by: Carmen Frei

Member of the Chamber of Deputies
- In office 11 March 2010 – 11 March 2018
- Preceded by: Jaime Quintana
- Succeeded by: Dissolution of the District
- Constituency: 49th District

Regional Counseller of the Government for the Araucanía Region
- In office January 2002 – March 2003

Personal details
- Born: 1 December 1976 (age 49) Temuco, Chile
- Party: Christian Democratic Party; Democrats
- Spouse: Karin Happke
- Education: University of Chile (LL.B)
- Occupation: Politician
- Profession: Lawyer

Fuad Eduardo Chahin Valenzuela (born 1 December 1976) is a Chilean politician and lawyer.

He served as Deputy for District 49 (Araucanía) from 2010 to 2014 and also 2014–2018. Similarly, Chahín was president of the Christian Democratic Party from 2018 to 2021.

In the November 2017 elections, Chahin ran unsuccessfully as a candidate for the Senate of Chile for the 11th Circumscription of the Araucanía Region, representing the Christian Democratic Party of Chile within the Convergencia Democrática pact.

He was subsequently elected president of the party for the 2018–2020 term, formally assuming office on 22 June 2018, and resigned from the position on 18 May 2021 following poor electoral results in the 2021 Chilean Constitutional Convention election.

== Early life ==
Chahin was born on 1 December 1976 in Temuco, Chile. He is the son of Fuad Armando Chahin Said and Gladis Valenzuela Lonconao. He is the grandson of a Palestinian immigrant and a Mapuche peasant.

From 1983 to 1990, Chahin completed his primary education at Liceo B No. 13 Las Araucarias in Curacautín and at Colegio De La Salle in Temuco. He completed his secondary education at Liceo Camilo Henríquez in the same city.

== Professional career ==
In 1995, he entered the School of Law of the University of Chile, where he earned a degree in Legal and Social Sciences and qualified as a lawyer on 15 November 2004.

In 2006, he was a founding partner of the Jorge Ahumada Institute Study Center. As a lawyer, he specialized in consumer rights defense and oral litigation. In April 2006, he joined the law firm Arévalo y Cía. From July 2007 onward, he has been a partner at Abdala y Cía. From 2006 to 2009, he also served as legal counsel for consumer organizations.

In the academic field, in 2008 he served as a lecturer in the Executive Skills Diploma program offered by the Institute of Public Affairs of the University of Chile.

== Political career ==
During his university years, Chahin became involved in politics as communal president of the Christian Democratic Youth of Curacautín in 1991. In 1995, he served as a student delegate of the Faculty of Law at the University of Chile. The following year, he joined the Constituent Commission and the Student Assembly of the Federation of Students of the University of Chile. In 1999, he became president of the Christian Democratic University organization at the same institution.

In the December 2001 parliamentary elections, he ran as a candidate for the Chamber of Deputies of Chile representing the Christian Democratic Party in the Araucanía Region, narrowly failing to be elected by a margin of 0.3%.

From January 2002 to March 2003, he served as Regional Ministerial Secretary (SEREMI) of Government for the Araucanía Region. In March 2003, he was appointed Director of the Social Organizations Division of the Ministry General Secretariat of Government, a position he held until early 2006. During this period, he also served on the Presidential Advisory Commission on the Citizen Ombudsman. From 2006 to 2009, he provided legislative advisory services to the Ministries of Justice and Mining.

He was elected as a member of the Constitutional Convention representing the PDC for the 22nd District of the Araucanía Region. In early November 2022, the party's Supreme Tribunal suspended his membership after he publicly supported the Reject option in the constitutional exit plebiscite, leading to his resignation from the party on 1 December 2022.

After one year and nine months of membership, he announced his resignation from Democrats on 18 November 2024, stating that the political project no longer represented him.
