= Sergio Molina =

Sergio Molina may refer to:

- Sergio Molina (footballer, born 1983)
- Sergio Molina (footballer, born 1996)
- Sergio Molina Silva, Chilean politician
- Sergio E. Molina, victim in a DUI vehicle crash, see Ethan Couch#Lawsuits
- Sergio Molina, Spanish actor, son of horror film actor and director Paul Naschy
