= Roberto Pizarro Hofer =

Chilean politician

Head of the Academy of Christian Humanism University
- In office 1 April 2010 – 13 August 2010

Minister of Social Development
- In office 28 September 1996 – 19 May 1998
- Appointed by: Eduardo Frei Ruíz-Tagle
- Preceded by: Luis Maira
- Succeeded by: Germán Quintana

Personal details
- Born: 9 October 1944 (age 81) Santiago, Chile
- Party: Socialist Party
- Education: University of Chile (B.Sc); University of Sussex (M.Sc)
- Occupation: Politician
- Profession: Economist

Roberto Guillermo Pizarro Hofer (born 9 October 1944) is a Chilean politician who served as minister of State and as head of the Academy of Christian Humanism University. He also was head of the La Nación newspaper.

== Biography ==
He was the son of Óscar Pizarro Gutiérrez, who, together with Salvador Allende and Marmaduke Grove, co-founded the Socialist Party of Chile (PS) in 1933, and Inés Hofer Gladinier. In 1967, he married Alicia Gariazzo Gavilán, with whom he had two sons, Andrés and Rodrigo.

He studied at the University of Chile, where he earned both a bachelor's degree in economics and a degree in business administration. He also pursued doctoral studies at the University of Sussex in the United Kingdom.

He taught at the Faculty of Economics and Business, University of Chile. During the military dictatorship of General Augusto Pinochet, he lived in Argentina, where he taught economics at the Faculty of Economic Sciences of the University of Buenos Aires. While in Argentina, he was arrested and imprisoned for more than a year in connection with what later became known as Operation Condor. He subsequently moved to England and later to Nicaragua, where he worked as a United Nations official.

He also served as a consultant to the Inter-American Development Bank (IDB), specializing in development planning, and was a researcher at the Latin American Council of Social Sciences (CLACSO).

He returned to Chile in 1990 and served until 1992 as deputy director of Bilateral Economic Affairs at the Ministry of Foreign Affairs, where he participated in trade negotiations with Mexico, Colombia, and Argentina.

He was subsequently appointed Chilean ambassador to Ecuador.

From 1996 to 1998, he served as Minister of Planning and Cooperation under President Eduardo Frei Ruiz-Tagle. He resigned because of policy differences with the Ministry of Finance.

In 2009, he joined the presidential campaign team of Jorge Arrate.

He has also served as a professor at the Andrés Bello Diplomatic Academy of Chile.
