= Luis Maira =

Chilean politician

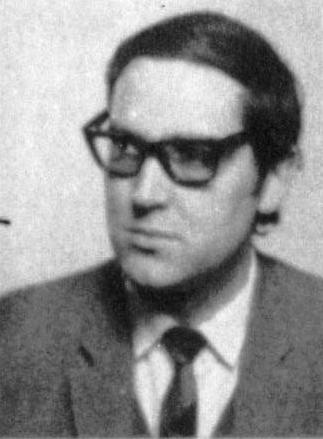
- Maira in 1969

Ambassador of Chile to Argentina
- In office 16 July 2004 – 10 March 2010
- Preceded by: Juan Gabriel Valdés
- Succeeded by: Miguel Otero

Ambassador of Chile to Mexico
- In office 1997–2003
- Preceded by: Carlos Portales Cifuentes
- Succeeded by: Fernando Molina Vallejo

Minister of Planning
- In office 11 March 1994 – 28 September 1996
- Preceded by: Sergio Molina Silva
- Succeeded by: Roberto Pizarro Hofer

Member of the Chamber of Deputies of Chile
- In office 15 May 1969 – 21 September 1973
- Succeeded by: Congress dissolved

President of the University of Chile Student Federation
- In office 1963 – November 1964
- Preceded by: José Nagel
- Succeeded by: Pedro Felipe Ramírez

Personal details
- Born: 9 August 1940 (age 86) Santiago, Chile
- Party: Chrisitan Democratic Party (1959−1971); Christian Left (1971−1973); Broad Party of Socialist Left (1988−1990); Socialist Party (1990−present)
- Spouse(s): Gabriela Peña Díaz (divorced); Marcela Serrano
- Children: Three
- Parent(s): Luis Maira Orrego; María Aguirre
- Education: University of Chile (LL.B)
- Occupation: Politician
- Profession: Lawyer

Luis Osvaldo Maira Aguirre (born 9 August 1940) is a Chilean politician and lawyer who served as deputy –during the Popular Unity– and as minister of State under Eduardo Frei Ruíz-Tagle's government. Similarly, he served as ambassador in Mexico and Argentina.

In the 1965 Chilean parliamentary election, he was elected to the Chamber of Deputies of Chile for Santiago's First District (Seventh Departmental Constituency), serving during the 1965–1969 legislative term.

== Biography ==
=== Family and education ===
He was born in Santiago on 9 August 1940, the eldest of three children of Luis Maira Orrego, a civil engineer and employee of the Empresa de los Ferrocarriles del Estado (EFE), and María Aguirre Aguirre, a homemaker. His father studied architecture at the Pontifical Catholic University of Chile, although he did not complete the degree and instead received the professional title of civil engineer. While at the university, he was a classmate of future deputy Tomás Reyes Vicuña. In the early 1950s, both he and his wife joined the National Falange.

He was first married to Gabriela Peña Díaz and later to Chilean writer Marcela Serrano, with whom he had two daughters.

He completed his primary education at Public School No. 220 and his secondary education at the Internado Nacional Barros Arana. He then enrolled at the University of Chile Faculty of Law, where he earned his law degree with a thesis entitled The Road to the Nationalization of Copper: Negotiations Between the Chilean State and the Anaconda Company.

=== Professional career ===
While attending university, he worked as a teaching assistant in courses on Roman law, legal history, Chilean constitutional history, political economy, and economic policy at the University of Chile.

In 1965, he traveled to England to participate in a roundtable on the development of industrial society held in Oxford, and in 1966 attended a seminar on economic and social development at Harvard University in the United States.

Following the 1973 Chilean coup d'état, he went into exile in 1974 and lived in Mexico for ten years, where he specialized in international relations.

During his years in exile, he taught postgraduate courses in international relations at the National Autonomous University of Mexico (UNAM), the Institute of International Relations of the Pontifical Catholic University of Rio de Janeiro in Brazil, the FLACSO campus in Buenos Aires, Argentina, and the Pontifical Catholic University of Chile.

Between 1975 and 1984, he organized and served as the founding director of the Institute for United States Studies at the Centro de Investigación y Docencia Económicas (CIDE) in Mexico City, while also serving as executive secretary of the Latin American Research Unit (ULA) from 1978 to 1982. Between 1984 and 1987, he was director of the Academic Division of the Joint Program on Latin American International Relations (RIAL), where he also oversaw the publication of its Yearbook of International Studies.

From 1990 to 1993, he served as president of the Center for the Analysis and Transformation of Chilean Society (CENAT) and directed the project on the Latin American impact of the North American Free Trade Agreement (NAFTA) at the Santiago office of the Instituto Latinoamericano de Estudios Transnacionales (ILET).

In 2003, he was a research professor affiliated with CIDE in Mexico and coordinator of international cooperation for the social development and poverty reduction programs of the government of the Mexican state of Chiapas.

== Political career ==
=== Early years ===
He began his political career while at university, joining the Christian Democratic Party (PDC) in 1959. In 1963, he served as national vice president, national councillor, and later national president of the Christian Democratic Youth of Chile (JDC). He was also a member of the party's Political Commission and Technical Political Committee, and represented the party at the World Congress of Christian Democracy held in Lima, Peru.

In 1962, he was elected president of the Law Students' Association at the University of Chile. From 1963 to 1964, as a member of the Christian Democratic University Movement (DCU), he served as president of the University of Chile Student Federation (FECh), during the period in which the federation was led by Christian Democrats (1957–1969). During the same period, he also served as the student representative on the University's Superior Council.

As a student leader, he attended several international conferences, including the University Social Action Seminar in 1962 and the World Congress on University Reform in 1964.
