= Raúl Sáez =

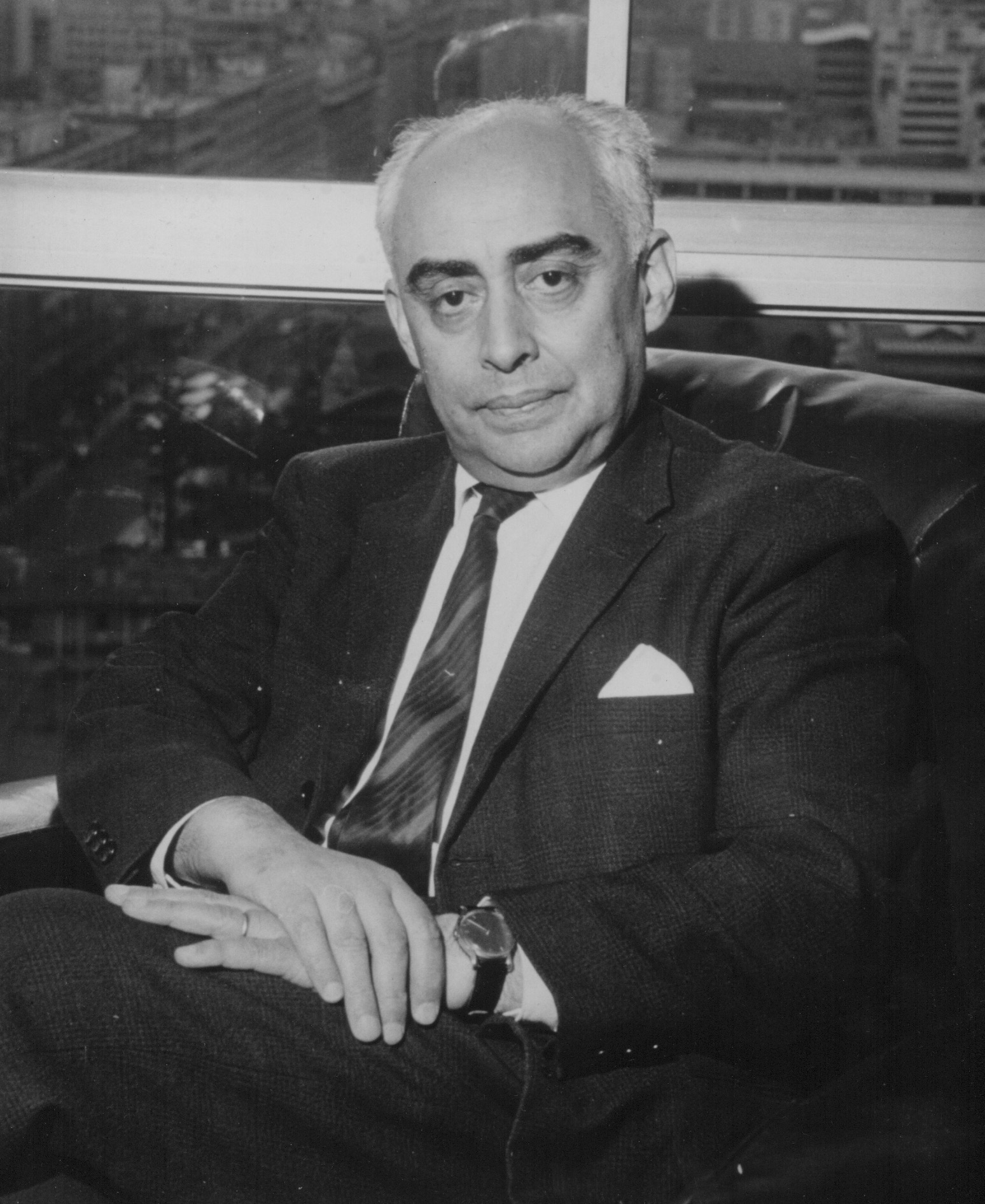
- Raúl Sáez Sáez, circa 1965.

Minister of Economic Coordination and Development
- In office 10 April 1975 – 10 February 1976
- President: Augusto Pinochet
- Preceded by: Office established
- Succeeded by: Vacant (Note: Office remained vacant until the ministry was abolished on 8 March 1976.)

Minister of Economic Coordination
- In office 8 July 1974 – 10 April 1975
- President: Augusto Pinochet
- Preceded by: Office established
- Succeeded by: Office abolished

Minister of Finance
- In office 15 February 1968 – 15 March 1968
- President: Eduardo Frei Montalva
- Preceded by: Sergio Molina Silva
- Succeeded by: Andrés Zaldívar

Executive Vice President of the Production Development Corporation (CORFO)
- In office 4 January 1965 – 30 April 1968
- President: Eduardo Frei Montalva
- Preceded by: Arturo Mackenna Shiell
- Succeeded by: Sergio Molina Silva

Personal details
- Born: Constitución, Chile
- Died: Santiago, Chile
- Party: Independent
- Spouse: Lillian Contreras
- Children: 5 (Felipe, Sebastián, Raúl Eduardo, María Liliana, Juan Carlos)
- Parent(s): Carlos Sáez Morales; Estela Sáez Rojas
- Education: University of Chile
- Occupation: Civil engineer; Politician
- Known for: Riñihuazo

Raúl Sáez Sáez (16 February 1913 – 24 November 1992) was a Chilean civil engineer. He served as Minister of Finance in Chile in 1968, and as Minister of Economic Coordination under the military junta from 1974 to 1975.

== Early life and education ==
Sáez was born in 1913 to a Chilean military officer who married his cousin. His first school years were spent in the Colegio Alemán (German School) of Santiago. In 1925, his father was sent to France on a military mission and the whole family traveled there. In Paris, Saez enrolled in one of the traditional French Lycées, in particular at the prestigious Lycée Janson de Sailly, where he studied Mathematics and Philosophy. Back in Chile in 1931, he enrolled in the School of Engineering at Universidad de Chile in Santiago, where he soon reached the top of his class and eventually became the best student of the university.

== Professional life ==
His first project after graduation was the Electrification Plan for Chile, which would eventually lead to the founding of Endesa (Chile's national electricity company). Saez actually joined Endesa in 1940 as Chief Engineer for Civil Engineering and eventually rose to the position of CEO of the company in 1961.

Without leaving his job in Endesa, Saez joined Compañía de Acero del Pacífico (CAP), Chile's largest steel manufacturing company, between 1944 and 1947 and played important roles in CORFO (Chile's corporation for industrial development), IANSA (Chile's national sugar company) and ENTEL (Chile's telecommunications company), among others.

He has been called "Chile's greatest maker of works of progress in the second half of the 20th century".

He is also well-remembered for leading the effort to avert the overflowing of Riñihue Lake in the aftermath of the devastating Great Chilean earthquake of 22 May 1960 (see Riñihuazo).

== Death and honors ==
Raúl Sáez died on 24 November 1992, a week after he was awarded the National Prize for Engineering and only one day after the Chilean government awarded him the National Prize for Applied Sciences and Technologies.
