= Jean-Paul Tarud Kuborn =

Chilean diplomat

1st Ambassador of Chile to the United Arab Emirates
- In office 2009 – May 2018
- President: Michelle Bachelet (2009–2010); Sebastián Piñera (2010–2014); Michelle Bachelet (2014–2018)
- Preceded by: Post Creation
- Succeeded by: Jorge Daccarett Bahna

Personal details
- Born: 1976 (age 49–50)

Jean-Paul Tarud Kuborn (Dubai, United Arab Emirates; 1976) is a former Chilean diplomat, the first resident ambassador of Chile to the United Arab Emirates.

== Biography ==
Born in Dubai, where his father, Jorge Tarud, was working in an architecture and interior design firm with his wife, Dominique Kuborn, during the Military Dictatorship in Chile. Tarud Kuborn is the eldest of two brothers. He lived in Dubai until he was 8 years old, then in Chile until the age of 15 and studied at the French School. He would then return to the GCC, Saudi Arabia in particular, when Jorge Tarud was appointed as the Ambassador of Chile in that country in 1990.

In 2006 he was appointed as the Commercial Attaché and opened the offices of ProChile in the city of Dubai, where Chilean exports were on the rise. Michelle Bachelet appointed him as the Ambassador of Chile to the United Arab Emirates in 2009, the same year that the Embassy was inaugurated. Tarud has accumulated over 26 years in the Arabian Peninsula, making him the most experienced Chilean Diplomat in the Middle East.

Tarud organized the official visit to Chile of the UAE Prime Minister, Sheikh Mohammed bin Rashid Al Maktoum, and participated in the elaboration of the bilateral agreements on investments and air transport, which were signed during the visit. He also coordinated the visits of the UAE Foreign Minister, Sheikh Abdullah bin Zayed Al Nahyan as well as the signature the political consultations agreement and the visa waiver agreement for Diplomatic and Official Passports (2013) and ordinary passport (2017), which have benefited Chile from a commercial and economic point of view.

in 2017, he obtained the largest donations for the reconstruction of areas of Chile that were affected by the wildfires, which affected the country that year. The donations obtained were for a total of USD 10 million (USD 5 million from the UAE and USD 5 million from Qatar), outshadowing by far the results and efforts of all the other Chilean missions abroad put together.

Tarud holds an MBA with a Marketing specialization from the ESCP Business School in Paris, and a Postgraduate degree in International Relations and a Bachelor in Business Management from the University of Canberra, Australia. He also did part of his studies at the Universidad Adolfo Ibáñez in Valparaíso and finished his secondary studies at the Santiago French School. He speaks six languages. Before being a diplomat, he worked in the private sector in the UAE from 2001 to 2006, and managed companies in Australia, France and the United States, in the fields of financial services, commerce and international relations during the 1990s.

in 2018, the UAE President, Sheikh Khalifa bin Zayed Al Nahyan conferred to Tarud the Zayed Order of Independence (First Class), the highest UAE medal given to a foreign national, in recognition of the crucial role he played in the relations between both countries.

== Controversies ==
The Diplomatic Association of Chile, through the then head Enrique Melkonian, declared in 2009 that "public opinion would perceive this appointment (as ambassador) as an act of nepotism", in reference to the fact that his father was an elected Member of Parliament at the time. However Ambassador Melkonian retracted himself publicly one year later, during an association assembly, in view of the positive performance of the young diplomat.

In 2013, Tarud was falsely accused of being involved in a supposed initiative of the Chilean government to sell water from Patagonia to Qatar, which was officially denied by the Chilean Foreign Ministry and by Tarud.
