= Luis Bates =

Chilean politician (1934–2023)

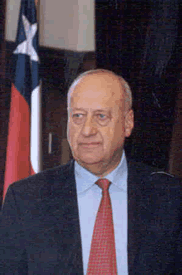
- Bates as Minister of Justice in 2003

Minister of Justice
- In office 3 March 2003 – 11 March 2006
- President: Ricardo Lagos
- Preceded by: José Antonio Gómez Urrutia
- Succeeded by: Isidro Solís

President of the State Defense Council of Chile
- In office 11 March 1994 – 11 March 1996
- President: Eduardo Frei Ruíz-Tagle
- Preceded by: Guillermo Piedrabuena
- Succeeded by: Clara Szczaranski

Personal details
- Born: 25 August 1934 Santiago, Chile
- Died: 29 November 2023 (aged 89) Santiago
- Party: Christian Democratic Party
- Spouse: Odette Boys
- Children: Two
- Education: University of Chile (LL.B); Complutense University of Madrid (LL.M)
- Profession: Lawyer

Luis Sergio Bates Hidalgo (25 August 1934 – 29 November 2023) was a Chilean lawyer and politician who served as Minister of Justice from 2003 to 2006.

== Education ==
He studied at the Instituto Nacional General José Miguel Carrera and later pursued a degree in law at the University of Chile. He subsequently obtained a doctorate in criminal law from the Complutense University of Madrid in Spain.

== Career ==
He practised law and served as an adjunct judge (abogado integrante) at the Court of Appeals of Santiago. He was a member of the Council for the Defence of the State of Chile for 35 years and served as its president from 1994 to 1996.

His career also included work as a lawyer for the Legal Aid Corporation and advisory role within the Chilean Bar Association.

In the academic sphere, he taught at various universities. At the University of Chile Law School, he taught in the area of criminal law. In addition, in 1970, he was one of the directors and creators - along with Benito Mauriz and the late Professor Eduardo Urrejola - of the country's first Legal Practice and Assistance Department, which we now know as the UC Law Clinic.

He was a director of the Centre for Civic Education at the San Sebastián University.

The implementation of the Criminal Procedure Reform stands as the central achievement of his tenure at the Ministry of Justice, which ended in March 2006.

== Death ==
Bates died on 29 November 2023, at the age of 89.
