= Rafael Tarud =

Chilean politician, minister, and senator (1918–2009)

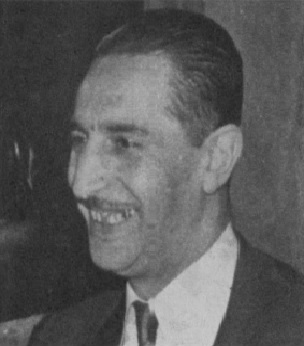
- Rafael Tarud in the 1960s

Minister of Mining
- In office 1953–1953
- President: Carlos Ibáñez del Campo
- Preceded by: Eduardo Paredes Martínez
- Succeeded by: Clodomiro Almeyda Medina

Minister of Economy and Commerce
- In office 1953–1953
- President: Carlos Ibáñez del Campo

Minister of Foreign Affairs
- President: Carlos Ibáñez del Campo

Senator
- In office 1957–1973

Personal details
- Born: April 30, 1918 Talca, Chile
- Died: May 2, 2009 (aged 91)
- Children: Jorge Tarud
- Education: University of Chile

Rafael Tarud Siwady (April 30, 1918 – May 2, 2009) was a prominent politician of Chile, Minister of Economy and Commerce (1953), Minister of Mining, Minister of Foreign Affairs (A.I.) and Senator for two terms (1957–1973). He was also a Presidential pre-candidate before he desisted in favour of Salvador Allende in 1970.

Born in Talca, Rafael Tarud Siwady entered University (Universidad de Chile) at the age of 15 where he studied Law. Shortly later he wedded Hélène Daccarett Mobarec, deceased in 1995, with whom he had 5 children among which is the current Member of Parliament and prominent politician Jorge Tarud, head of the Foreign Affairs and Defence committees.

He was appointed Minister at the age of 35 by President Carlos Ibáñez del Campo (1952–1958), where he held the position of Minister of Economy and Commerce, as well as the interim positions of Minister of Mining and Minister of Foreign Affairs. He later became a Senator for the region of Talca for two terms. He was also a Presidencial pre-candidate in 1970 and later desisted in favour of Salvador Allende becoming his chief of campaign.

During the presidency of Salvador Allende (1970–1973) he was also the President of the Independent Popular Action (Acción Popular Independiente, API) a party that he created in 1968 and was part of the Unidad Popular coalition. After the military coup that took power in 1973, Rafael Tarud lived in exile in Switzerland and Spain until he was permitted to return to Chile in 1983.
