= Carol Bown =

Chilean politician

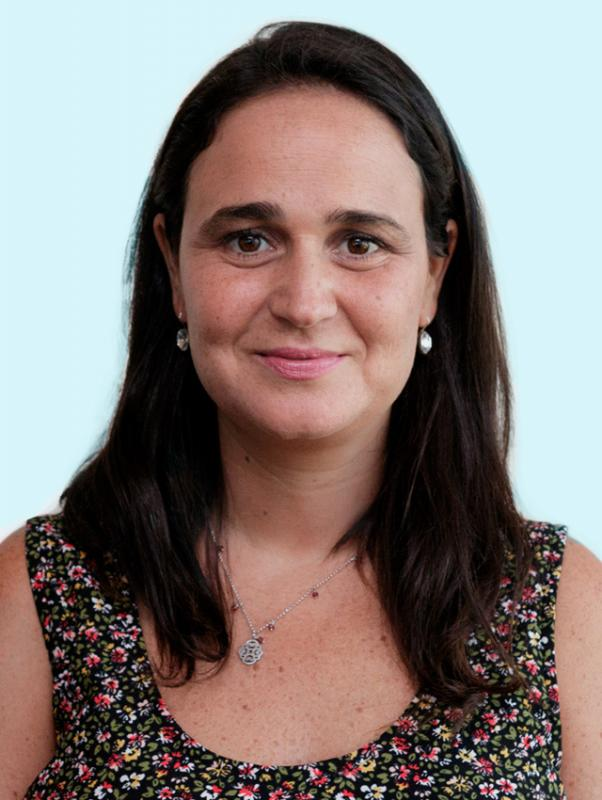
- Official portrait (2018)

Mayor of San Miguel
- Incumbent
- Assumed office 6 December 2024

Member of the Constitutional Convention
- In office 4 July 2021 – 4 July 2022
- Constituency: 15th District

Undersecretary of Childhood
- In office 12 April 2018 – 6 January 2021
- Preceded by: Creation of the charge
- Succeeded by: Blanquita Honorato

Undersecretary of Carabineros de Chile
- In office 11 March 2010 – 28 February 2011
- Preceded by: Javiera Blanco
- Succeeded by: Dissolution of the charge

Personal details
- Born: 30 September 1978 (age 47) Santiago, Chile
- Party: Independent Democratic Union
- Spouse: Nicolás Terrazas
- Children: Three
- Parent(s): Ronald Bown; María Teresa Sepúlveda
- Education: Pontifical Catholic University of Chile (LL.B); Georgetown University (LL.M)
- Occupation: Politician
- Profession: Lawyer

Carol Cecilia Bown Sepúlveda (born 30 September 1978) is a Chilean political who currently serves as mayor of San Miguel, a commune of the capital city, Santiago.

She was elected as a member of the Chilean Constitutional Convention.

During part of the second government of Sebastián Piñera (2018−2022), she was Undersecretary for Childhood, institution linked to the Social Development Minister.

== Early life and education ==
Bown was born on 30 September 1978 in Santiago, Chile, to Ronald Steve Bown Fernández and María Teresa Sepúlveda Rodríguez. She completed her primary and secondary education at Colegio Los Andes in Vitacura, graduating in 1996.

In 1997, she enrolled in the Faculty of Law at the Pontifical Catholic University of Chile, completing her legal studies in 2001 and later qualifying as a lawyer.

She subsequently pursued postgraduate studies, earning a master’s degree in public policy from Universidad del Desarrollo (2006–2007) and a master’s degree in law from Georgetown University in the United States (2007–2008).

== Professional career ==
Before holding senior public office, Bown worked as a parliamentary legislative adviser and as a legal adviser to the municipalities of Huechuraba and Curacaví.

Her professional career has been closely linked to public administration and legislative work.

== Political career ==
Bown is a member of the Independent Democratic Union (UDI). During the first administration of President Sebastián Piñera, she served as Undersecretary of Carabineros of Chile from 11 March 2010 to 28 February 2011.

She later served as Undersecretary for Childhood from 12 April 2018 to 6 January 2021 during Piñera’s second presidency.

In 2008, she ran unsuccessfully for mayor of Quilicura. In the Constitutional Convention elections held on 15–16 May 2021, she was elected as a representative for the 15th district of the Libertador General Bernardo O’Higgins Region as part of the Vamos por Chile electoral pact, receiving 7,402 votes (4.09% of valid votes).

Within the Constitutional Convention, Bown participated in the Commission on Decentralisation, Equity and Territorial Justice during the drafting of the Convention’s regulations.

She later served on the thematic commission on the Justice System, Autonomous Oversight Bodies and Constitutional Reform, where she was elected deputy secretary in early 2022. In May 2022, she joined the Harmonisation Commission.

In 2024, she was elected mayor of San Miguel.
