= Germán Quintana =

Chilean politician

Minister of Social Development
- In office 19 May 1998 – 11 March 2000
- President: Eduardo Frei Ruíz-Tagle
- Preceded by: Roberto Pizarro Hofer
- Succeeded by: Alejandra Krauss

Intendant of the Santiago Metropolitan Region
- In office 7 August 1996 – 19 May 1998
- Appointed by: Eduardo Frei Ruíz-Tagle
- Preceded by: Álex Figueroa Muñoz
- Succeeded by: Ernesto Velasco

Undersecretary of Public Works
- In office 11 March 1994 – 7 August 1996
- Appointed by: Eduardo Frei Ruíz-Tagle
- Preceded by: Juan Enrique Miquel
- Succeeded by: Guillermo Pickering

President of the University of Chile Student Federation
- In office 1986–1988
- Preceded by: Humberto Burotto
- Succeeded by: Andrés Lastra

Personal details
- Born: 1 May 1960 (age 66) Santiago, Chile
- Party: Christian Democratic Party
- Education: University of Chile (B.Sc)
- Occupation: Politician
- Profession: Civil engineer

Germán Pablo Quintana Peña (born 1 May 1960) is a Chilean politician who served as minister of State and as intendant.

In 2000, the Chilean government appointed him as its representative to the Inter-American Development Bank (IDB).

He subsequently became head of the Department of State Modernization and Governance at the Organization of American States (OAS).

In 2007, he was appointed Chief of Staff to the President of the Inter-American Development Bank, and in 2009 became the institution's secretary. He retired from the Bank in 2021 and remained based in Washington, D.C.. Following his departure, he launched a music-focused YouTube channel titled Mundo Análogo.

He has been named an Honorary Citizen of the La Cisterna commune.

== Career ==
In 1986, he was elected president of the University of Chile Student Federation (FECh), where he led one of the student movement's most significant victories during the military dictatorship: the successful campaign that resulted in the removal of government-appointed university rector José Luis Federici during the Federici protests. Earlier, he had served as president of the Christian Democratic Youth of Chile (JDC) chapter in La Cisterna and as president of the Engineering Students' Center (CEI) at the University of Chile Faculty of Physical and Mathematical Sciences]], from which he graduated as an electrical civil engineer.

In 1990, he became head of Information Technology at the Ministry of the Interior, and later served as executive secretary of the Interministerial Information Technology Group. He also coordinated the Prospective Studies Program at Corporación Tiempo 2000.

In 1994, he was appointed Undersecretary of Public Works, where he worked closely with Ricardo Lagos, then Minister of Public Works and later President of Chile.

In 1996, he succeeded Álex Figueroa as Intendant of the Santiago Metropolitan Region. Despite being one of the youngest officials in the government, he earned the nickname "Iron Intendant". During his tenure, he oversaw several major public policy initiatives, including the preparation and approval of the Air Pollution Prevention and Decontamination Plan for the Santiago Metropolitan Region, implementation of the Violence in Stadiums Act, and the maintenance of public order in the capital.

From 1998 to 2000, he served as Minister of Planning and Cooperation. In that capacity, he organized the Communal Dialogues with Chile's Indigenous communities, the first major government initiative to consult Indigenous peoples directly and incorporate their priorities into public investment planning. The process concluded with a ceremony at La Moneda Palace, attended by approximately one thousand Mapuche lonkos, senior representatives of all branches of government, academic leaders, and business organizations, during which participants signed the Pact of Mutual Respect.
