= Isidro Solís =

Chilean politician

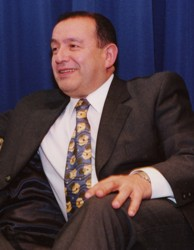

Minister of Justice
- In office 11 March 2006 – 27 March 2007
- President: Michelle Bachelet
- Preceded by: Luis Bates
- Succeeded by: Carlos Maldonado Curti

Personal details
- Born: 30 March 1954 (age 72) Santiago, Chile
- Other political affiliations: Radical Party (1970–1994; 2018–2022); Radical Social Democrat Party (1994–2018); Amarillos por Chile (2022–2025)
- Spouse: María Francisca Oliver
- Children: Four
- Education: University of Concepción (LL.B); University of Chile (LL.M)
- Occupation: Politician
- Profession: Lawyer

Isidro del Carmen Solís Palma (born 30 March 1954) is a Chilean politician and lawyer who served as Minister of Justice during the first government of Michelle Bachelet from 2006 to 2007.

== Biography ==
He completed his primary education at English High School and his secondary studies at the José Victorino Lastarria High School, from which he graduated in 1971.

He studied law for two years at the University of Concepción before completing his degree at the University of Chile in Santiago.

He practiced law privately between 1977 and 1990. Between 1987 and 1988, he served as secretary of the General Council of the Chilean Bar Association.

== Political career ==
He entered public service in 1990 as head of the Executive Division of the Ministry General Secretariat of the Presidency. From December 1990 to March 1993, he served as National Director of the Chilean Gendarmerie.

From March 1993 to May 1995, he served as Director of Public Security and Information, becoming the first person to hold that position.

Between 1995 and 2002, he returned to private legal practice before rejoining the central government during the administration of Ricardo Lagos, where he served as Undersecretary of Mining and later as Undersecretary of Aviation.

He served as Minister of Justice under President Michelle Bachelet from 11 March 2006 to 26 March 2007.

He was a member of the Radical Party for 52 years. He left the party in September 2022 to join the political movement Amarillos por Chile.
