= Gabriel Alemparte =

Chilean politician

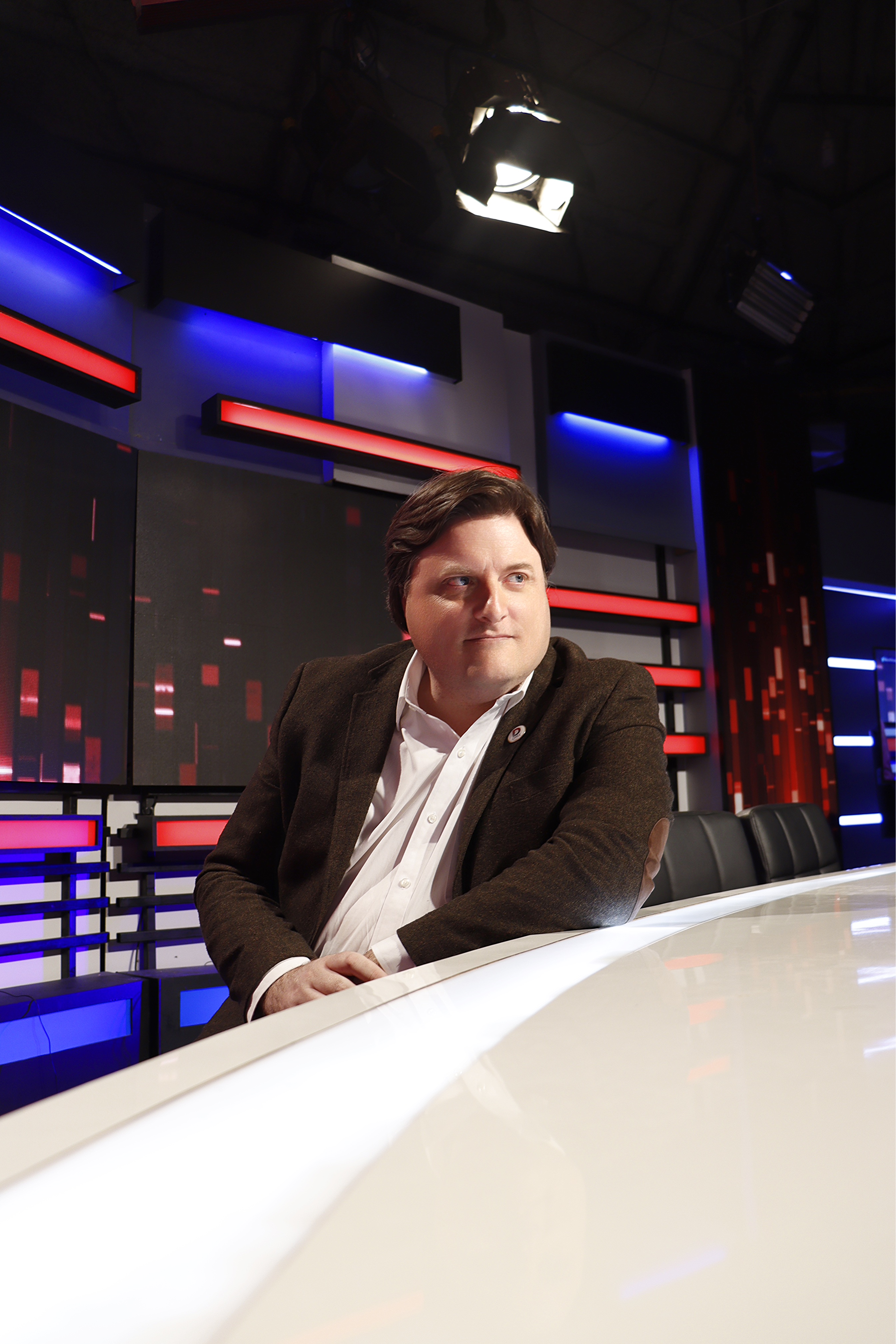

Personal details
- Born: 12 March 1981 (age 45) Santiago, Chile
- Party: Christian Democracy (DC) (2001–2020); Democrats (2022–2025)
- Children: 2
- Parent(s): José Gabriel Alemparte; Claudia Mery
- Relatives: José Antonio Alemparte (great-great-grandfather); Sergio Alemparte (grandfather)
- Education: Diego Portales University (LL.B); Pontifical Catholic University of Chile (Master's Degree)
- Occupation: Politician
- Profession: Lawyer; Political scientist

José Gabriel Alemparte Mery (born 12 March 1981) is a Chilean lawyer, political commentator, and former politician.

He was a founder and vice president of the Democrats party and previously held several positions in the Chilean public administration. He gained wider public prominence during the 2022 constitutional referendum as one of the spokespeople for the Rechazo ("Reject") campaign.

Alemparte began his political career in the Christian Democratic Party (PDC), which he left in 2018. He held government positions during the administrations of Michelle Bachelet.

From 2022, Alemparte adopted increasingly liberal political positions, first supporting the Rechazo option and later the presidential candidacy of Evelyn Matthei. After the first round of the 2025 Chilean presidential election, he endorsed José Antonio Kast in the runoff, although he did not formally join Kast's government after his victory.

Alemparte is a regular panelist on the political debate program Sin filtros, where he became known for his criticism of the Boric administration. He is also a columnist for La Tercera, a regular panelist on Radio Agricultura, and has served on the board of the Vicente Huidobro Museum Foundation in Cartagena, Chile.

== Early life and education ==
Alemparte was born in Santiago on 12 March 1981. He is the son of Claudia Mery Domeyko, a great-great-granddaughter of Ignacy Domeyko, and architect José Gabriel Alemparte Rojas. His grandfather was architect Sergio Alemparte Aldunate.

He attended the Alliance Française in Santiago and later Sagrados Corazones de Manquehue.

Alemparte studied law at Diego Portales University, where he qualified as a lawyer. He later pursued a master's degree in political science and international relations at the Pontifical Catholic University of Chile, where he received a scholarship from the Konrad Adenauer Foundation.

== Political career ==
Alemparte joined the Christian Democratic Party in 2001 and remained a member until 2018. During the first Bachelet administration, he worked at the Ministry of Transport and Telecommunications and the Ministry of Justice, where he served as chief of staff.

In April 2011, Alemparte joined the municipality of Maipú under mayor Alberto Undurraga, first as legal director and later as municipal administrator. After leaving Maipú in December 2012, he became director of community development (DIDECO) in Providencia under mayor Josefa Errázuriz.

During Bachelet's second administration, Alemparte served as chief of staff at the Ministry of Public Works under minister Alberto Undurraga and participated in the management of infrastructure concession plans.

In 2022, Alemparte became one of the spokespeople for the Rechazo campaign in the 4 September constitutional referendum, in which the proposed constitution was rejected by approximately 62% of voters. He later participated in the founding of the Democrats party and was elected one of its vice presidents.

In 2024, Democrats nominated Alemparte as its prospective candidate for governor of the Santiago Metropolitan Region. On 30 July, he withdrew his candidacy and endorsed National Renewal candidate Francisco Orrego, who was subsequently defeated in the election.

In 2025, the Electoral Service of Chile moved to dissolve Democrats after the party failed to reach the statutory electoral threshold in the parliamentary elections.

== Media career ==
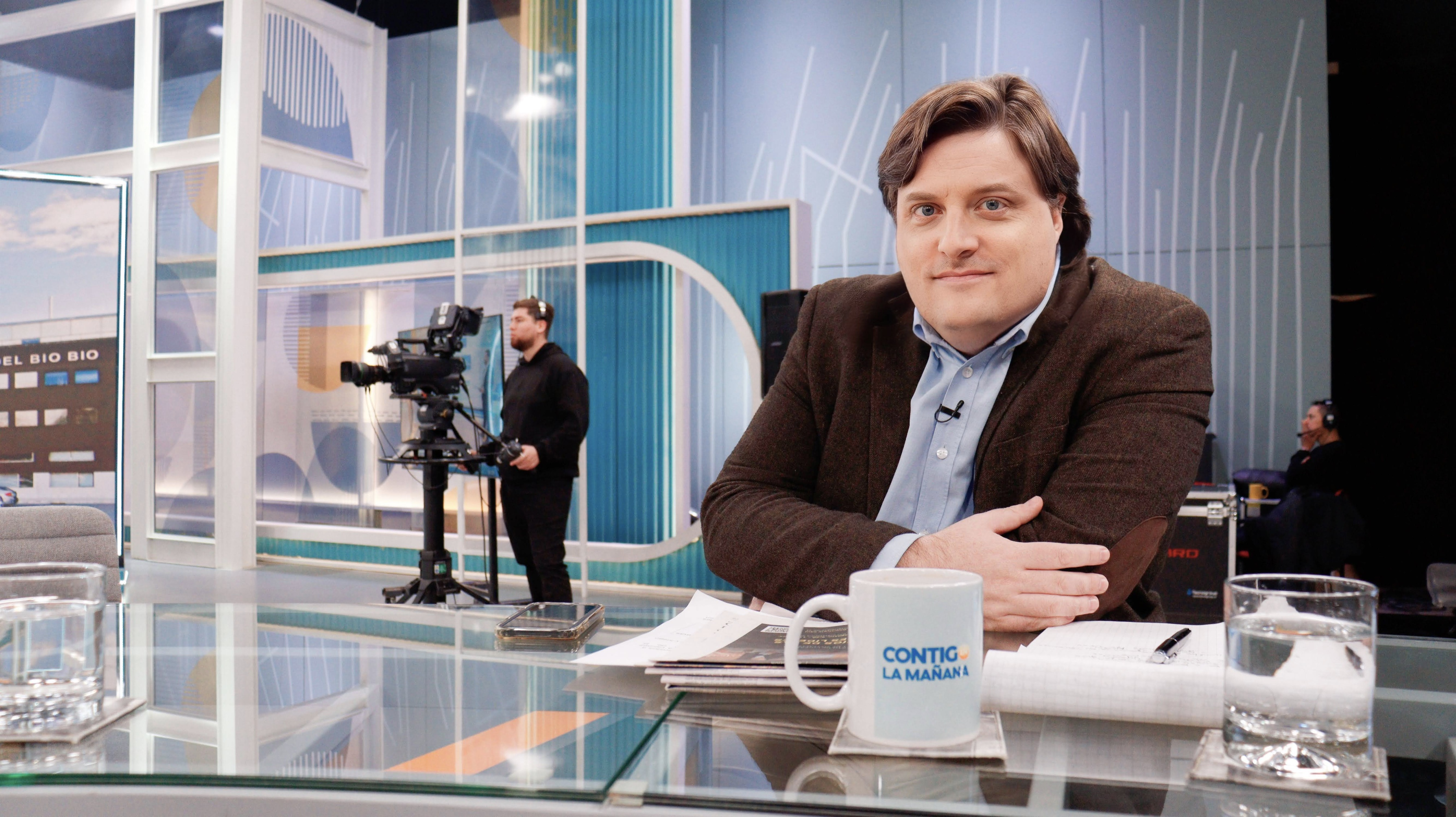
Alemparte on the Chilevisión morning show Contigo en la mañana in 2023

Alemparte began appearing on televised political debate programs in 2021, during the elections for Chile's Constitutional Convention. He later became a regular political commentator on the 2022 and 2023 constitutional processes and other domestic political issues. He also publicly supported Venezuelan opposition leader María Corina Machado and was among 120 Chilean signatories of an initiative supporting her nomination for the Nobel Peace Prize.

Alemparte's appearances on Sin filtros have received media attention for confrontations with other panelists and guests. In January 2024, he was criticized after an exchange with Valeria Cárcamo over comments about Carabineros de Chile during the 2019–2020 Chilean protests. Complaints were subsequently filed with the National Television Council (CNTV), which declined to sanction the broadcast.

In August 2024, Alemparte had a widely reported dispute with journalist Juan Cristóbal Guarello after criticizing minister Antonia Orellana over the dismissal of Isabel Amor from the regional leadership of SernamEG. Alemparte referred to the political background of Guarello's grandfather, prompting a public response from Guarello. Days later, the two had a tense confrontation on Sin filtros.

In August 2025, Alemparte had another heated exchange on the program, this time with lawyer Luis Mariano Rendón. The dispute continued during a commercial break, when production staff intervened as Rendón approached Alemparte. Their public disagreement continued into 2026, including an exchange over Rendón's challenge to the use of the national coat of arms on President José Antonio Kast's presidential sash.
