= Democrats (Chile) =

Defunct political party in Chile (2022–2026)

Democrats Demócratas
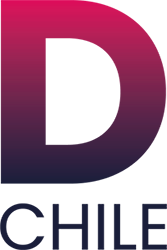
- Abbreviation: D
- President: Ximena Rincón
- General Secretary: Carlos Maldonado Curti
- Vice Presidents: Matías Walker; Marcelo Urrutia; María Paz Fuenzalida; Gabriel Alemparte; Jorge Tarud; Carolina Latorre; Jorge de la Carrera
- Founded: November 2, 2022
- Dissolved: February 16, 2026
- Split from: Christian Democratic Party; Party for Democracy; Radical Party
- Headquarters: Santiago
- Ideology: Moderate conservatism Christian humanism Christian democracy Social liberalism Third way
- Political position: Centre to centre-right
- National affiliation: Chile Grande y Unido (since 2025)
- Colours: Light red; Navy blue
- Chamber of Deputies: 1 / 155
- Senate: 2 / 50

Website
- www.democratas.cl

Democrats (D) (Spanish: Demócratas) was a Chilean political party positioned on the center-right of the political spectrum. In November 2025, it received an order of dissolution after failing to reach the minimum vote threshold in parliamentary elections.

The party was founded on November 2, 2022, by former members of the Christian Democratic Party (PDC), the Party for Democracy (PPD), and the Radical Party of Chile (PR). Official recognition by the Electoral Service (Servel) was granted on July 28, 2023.

The party’s creation occurred in the context of the 2022 constitutional referendum, in which the draft constitution proposed by the Constitutional Convention was rejected by a majority of voters.

Positioning itself as a guardian of institutional stability, republican values, and democratic pluralism, Democrats arose from a faction disenchanted with the ideological radicalization and alliance shifts within the historic center-left coalition Concertación and its successor parties.

Its founders—including experienced legislators such as former Senate president Ximena Rincón, deputies like Matías Walker, ex-ministers like Carlos Maldonado, and lawyers and commentators such as Gabriel Alemparte—advocate for a pragmatic political agenda focused on social dialogue, rule of law, and economic responsibility.

== History ==
=== 2022 Plebiscite ===
The movement emerged during the campaign for the constitutional plebiscite held on September 4, 2022. Several members of the Christian Democratic Party, the Party for Democracy, and the Radical Party of Chile chose to support the “Rechazo” (Reject) option, even though their parties had officially endorsed “Apruebo” (Approve) for the proposed constitution. Supporters of this stance created a platform named Centroizquierda por el Rechazo (“Center-Left for Rejection”).

Several of these figures were disciplined by their own parties. Senators Ximena Rincón and Matías Walker were referred to the Supreme Tribunal of the Christian Democrats, accused of “shifting the party to the right.” A similar case affected Carlos Maldonado, former presidential candidate of the Radical Party, whose membership was suspended.

After the “Rechazo” victory, centrist and center-left leaders who had supported that option sought to form a common platform. This led to a wave of resignations: Maldonado left the Radical Party on September 12, while Rincón and Walker left the Christian Democrats on October 27.

=== Foundation of the Party ===
On November 2, 2022, following the departure of Senators Rincón and Walker, a group of former center-left politicians announced the creation of a new collective named Demócratas.

The founders described the party as “democratic, humanist, pluralist, regionalist and secular,” aiming to occupy the centrist space left open after the decline of the Concertación. They also declared openness to alliances with other political forces and stated they would neither align with nor oppose the government of Gabriel Boric.

Among the founding members were former PPD deputy Jorge Tarud, constitutional convention member Miguel Ángel Botto, councilor of Pudahuel, Patricio Cisternas, councilor of Renca, Camila Avilés, and former director of the Sename, Marcela Labraña.

On November 4, the provisional leadership submitted documentation to the Electoral Service (Servel) to begin the formal registration process. The founding charter was officially published on November 21, 2022.

It joined the Chile Grande y Unido coalition for the 2025 Chilean general election.

== Ideology ==
Demócratas defines itself as a centrist party bringing together both center-left and center-right currents — reflecting the diverse origins of its founders from the PDC, PPD, and PR. Its platform combines Christian democratic, humanist, pluralist, and regionalist values, claiming the legacy of the Concertación, which stabilized Chilean democracy, fostered growth, and reduced poverty.

Rejecting ideological rigidity, the party seeks to be a pragmatic yet principled actor promoting moderation as an ethical stance against populism and extremism. Its doctrine is rooted in the “radical center” and republicanism, emphasizing civic virtue, rule of law, and institutional continuity. Demócratas rejects political maximalism but aspires to play a pivotal role by cooperating with liberals from Evópoli, provided basic principles such as Human rights, macroeconomic stability, public security, and Democracy are respected.

The party aims to revive a pragmatic and trustworthy culture of governance capable of overcoming polarization and restoring public confidence in institutions.

== International relations ==
Demócratas was invited, along with Amarillos por Chile and National Renewal (RN), to a meeting organized by the Konrad Adenauer Foundation, scheduled for January 13, 2024, in Berlin. The German foundation, linked to the Christian Democratic Union of Germany (CDU) — a well-known center-right party — excluded the Chilean Christian Democratic Party (DC) from the event, alleging that it had “moved away from the political center.”

== Election results ==
=== Congress elections ===
Election year	Chamber of Deputies			Senate			Status
Election year	# Votes	% Votes	Seats	# Votes	% Votes	Seats	Status
2025	212,930	1.99%	1 / 155	77,986	2.52%	2 / 50	Government

== See also ==
- List of political parties in Chile
