= Sergio Molina Silva =

Chilean politician

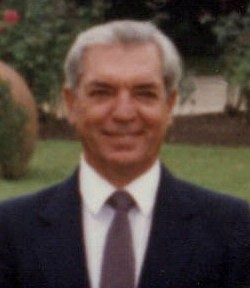

Minister of Education
- In office 20 September 1994 – 28 September 1996
- President: Eduardo Frei Ruíz-Tagle
- Preceded by: Ernesto Schifelbein
- Succeeded by: José Pablo Arellano

Minister of Planning
- In office 19 July 1990 – 11 March 1994
- President: Patricio Aylwin
- Preceded by: Creation of the office
- Succeeded by: Luis Maira

Head Minister of the National Planification Office of Chile (ODEPLAN)
- In office 11 March 1990 – 19 July 1990
- President: Patricio Aylwin
- Preceded by: Luis Larraín Arroyo
- Succeeded by: Office abolished

Minister Executive Vicepresident of the Corporación de Fomento de la Producción (CORFO)
- In office 1 May 1968 – 3 November 1970
- President: Eduardo Frei Ruíz-Tagle
- Preceded by: Raúl Sáez
- Succeeded by: Kurt Dreckmann

President of the Central Bank of Chile
- In office 3 November 1964 – 1967
- President: Eduardo Frei Montalva
- Preceded by: Luis Mackenna
- Succeeded by: Carlos Massad

Governor of the Inter-American Development Bank
- In office 1964–1967

Minister of Finance
- In office 3 November 1964 – 15 February 1968
- President: Eduardo Frei Montalva
- Preceded by: Luis Mackenna
- Succeeded by: Raúl Sáez

Head of Budgets of Chile
- In office 1960 – 3 November 1994
- President: Jorge Alessandri
- Preceded by: Creation of the office
- Succeeded by: Edgardo Boeninger

Head of the Budgets Office of Chile
- In office 1954–1960
- President: Carlos Ibáñez del Campo (1952−1958); Jorge Alessandri (1958−1964)
- Preceded by: Heraclio Martínez
- Succeeded by: Abolition of the office

Personal details
- Born: 6 December 1928 (age 97) Talca, Chile
- Party: Christian Democratic Party
- Spouse: Paulina Barros Holman
- Children: Three
- Parent(s): Violeta Silva Barros; Sergio Molina Borgoño
- Education: University of Chile (B.Sc)
- Occupation: Scholar
- Profession: Economist

Sergio Molina Silva (born 6 September 1928) is a Chilean politician who served as minister.

He is a member of the Chilean Academy of Political, Social, and Moral Sciences.

== Family and education ==
He was born in Talca on 6 December 1928, the eldest of four siblings of the marriage between Sergio Molina Borgoño and Violeta Silva Barros, daughter of former deputy and minister Matías Silva Sepúlveda and Ana Barros Jarpa (sister of Ernesto Barros Jarpa). He lived in the countryside until the age of twelve.

At the same time, he completed his primary education at the Liceo Blanco Encalada of Talca and later, from his second year of humanities, at the San Ignacio School of Santiago. Among his teachers was the priest Alberto Hurtado, later canonized as a saint. He married Paulina Barros Holman, with whom he had three daughters.

In 1946, he entered the University of Chile to study at the School of Economic Sciences, graduating in 1950.

== Political career ==
=== Governments of Ibáñez, Alessandri, and Frei ===
In 1949—during the presidency of Gabriel González Videla—while still a student, he joined the Ministry of Finance as part of the first group of economic advisers of the ministry, which later became the basis of the Financial Studies Department. The minister at the time was the future president Jorge Alessandri. Between 1954 and 1960, he served as director of the Budget Office under the administration of President Carlos Ibáñez del Campo. Subsequently, when the office was renamed the Budget Directorate, he assumed its leadership during the government of Alessandri, serving until 1964.

His close ties with senior Christian Democratic figures—he was initially an independent—enabled him to serve, from November 1964 to March 1968, as Minister of Finance, and until 1967 as president of the Central Bank of Chile, during the administration of President Eduardo Frei Montalva. Between 1968 and 1970, he served as executive vice president of the state-owned Corporation for the Promotion of Production (CORFO).

He served as governor of the Inter-American Development Bank between 1964 and 1967. Between 1962 and 1964, he was dean of the Faculty of Economics and Business, University of Chile.

He did not collaborate during the government of Salvador Allende (1970–1973), and following the coup d'état of 11 September 1973 led by General Augusto Pinochet, he went into exile.

=== Role in the Concertación ===
From 1985 to 1987, he served as coordinator of the National Agreement for the Transition to Full Democracy, under the auspices of Cardinal Juan Francisco Fresno, together with José Zabala and Fernando Léniz.

Between 11 March 1990 and 19 July of the same year, he served as minister-director of the National Planning Office (ODEPLAN), and between that date and 11 March 1994 as Minister of Planning and Cooperation under President Patricio Aylwin.

On 20 September 1994, he was appointed Minister of Education by the incoming president Eduardo Frei Ruiz-Tagle. He headed that ministry until 28 September 1996.

=== Later activities ===
During the first administration of President Michelle Bachelet (2006–2010), he collaborated at her request on the Commission on Work and Equity, together with several other experts not formally part of the government.

He participated in numerous private companies, most notably serving as vice president of the Banco del Desarrollo, a financial institution later owned by Scotiabank Sud Americano, the Chilean subsidiary of the Canadian bank Scotiabank.
