= Carmen Frei =

Chilean politician and teacher

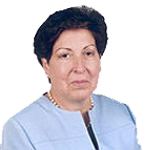

Member of the Senate of Chile
- In office 11 March 1990 – 11 March 2006
- Preceded by: District created
- Succeeded by: José Antonio Gómez
- Constituency: 2nd Circumscription

Personal details
- Born: 22 June 1938 (age 88) Santiago, Chile
- Party: Christian Democratic Party
- Spouse: Eugenio Ortega
- Children: 3
- Education: University of Chile
- Occupation: Politician
- Profession: Teacher

Carmen Frei Ruiz–Tagle (born 22 June 1938) is a Chilean politician and teacher. She served as Senator from 1990 to 2006.

Frei was born in Santiago, the eldest child to Eduardo Frei Montalva and María Ruiz-Tagle. She studied at the Colegio Universitario Inglés; and later graduated as a teacher (specializing in infants) from the Universidad de Chile.

She became a councilwoman for Santiago in 1970, and was elected Senator for Antofagasta in 1990, being reelected in 1998. She lost the position in 2006. She was married to Eugenio Ortega and has three children.

== Early life and education ==
Frei was born in Santiago on 22 June 1938. She is the daughter of former President of Chile Eduardo Frei Montalva and María Ruiz-Tagle Jiménez.

She is the sister of former President Eduardo Frei Ruiz-Tagle and a cousin of former parliamentarian and 1999 presidential candidate Arturo Frei Bolívar. She was married to Eugenio Ortega Riquelme, a former Christian Democratic deputy and party leader, who died in 2013. They had three children.

She completed her primary and secondary education at the English University School and later studied at the University of Chile, where she obtained the professional degree of early childhood educator.

She graduated in 1962 and subsequently traveled to West Germany and Belgium, where she pursued studies in child psychology at the Catholic University of Leuven.

== Political career ==
=== Beginnings ===
During her university years, Frei was a Christian Democratic student leader within the Student Federation of the University of Chile (FECH). She actively participated in the 1957 student movement in which the youth wing of her party achieved electoral victories across most student federations nationwide. In 1958, she accompanied her father during his first presidential campaign and toured the country.

After returning to Chile in 1966, she participated in the commission responsible for drafting legislation on nurseries and child care centers.

In 1967, she was appointed director of a private foundation dedicated to the promotion of child care services, which bears her name. In the 1971 municipal elections, she was elected councilor of the Municipality of Santiago, obtaining the highest national vote total among councilors.

Between 1971 and 1973, Frei served as a member of the National Council of the Christian Democratic Party of Chile (DC), representing party councilors.

=== Pinochet regime ===
In 1976, she settled in Larchmont, New York, where she worked for three years in the Federal Program for Assistance to Children of Latin American Origin. Upon her return to Chile in 1979, she was elected director of the Women's Department of the Christian Democratic Party.

From 1979 onward, Frei became actively involved in women's opposition movements against the military dictatorship. In 1982, she joined the National Executive Committee of the Christian Democratic Party led by Gabriel Valdés. During this period, she participated in multiple solidarity initiatives supporting victims of human rights violations and presided over commissions assisting marginalized communities, including the creation of the Family Solidarity Movement, through which she organized aid campaigns for persecuted workers and residents.

In 1985, Frei was appointed national councilor of the Christian Democratic Party and chaired the National Commission of former Democratic mayors and councilors. In 1987, she organized the International Meeting on Municipal Democracy, attended by more than forty European mayors and councilors.

=== Return to Democracy ===
Following the victory of the No option in the 1988 plebiscite, Frei ran for the Senate in the 1989 parliamentary elections representing the 2nd Senatorial District (Antofagasta Region). She was elected with the highest vote total, receiving 58,852 votes (28.84%). She was reelected in the 1997 parliamentary elections, again achieving the first majority with 58,492 votes (35.05%).

In 2005, she sought reelection for the Senate but was defeated by Radical Party leader and former Minister of Justice José Antonio Gómez. After leaving Congress, Frei continued her public activities, including serving as director of the Women's Project of the Eduardo Frei Montalva Foundation.

Between 6 May 2014 and 17 May 2018, she served as chair of the board of directors of Polla Chilena de Beneficencia. In May 2018, she was elected first vice president of the Christian Democratic Party under the leadership of Fuad Chahín.

On 3 January 2020, Frei was appointed coordinator of the Christian Democratic Party’s Command for the Approval of a New Constitution and later joined the Women for Approval coordination committee in the lead-up to the national plebiscite held on 25 October 2020. On 19 May 2021, she assumed the position of interim president of the Christian Democratic Party, a role confirmed by the party’s Supreme Tribunal until 2022.

In 2023, Frei ran as a candidate for the Constitutional Council representing the Christian Democratic Party on the Todo por Chile list in the Metropolitan Region. She was not elected, obtaining 2.74% of the vote.
