= José Antonio Gómez Urrutia =

Chilean politician

José Antonio Gómez
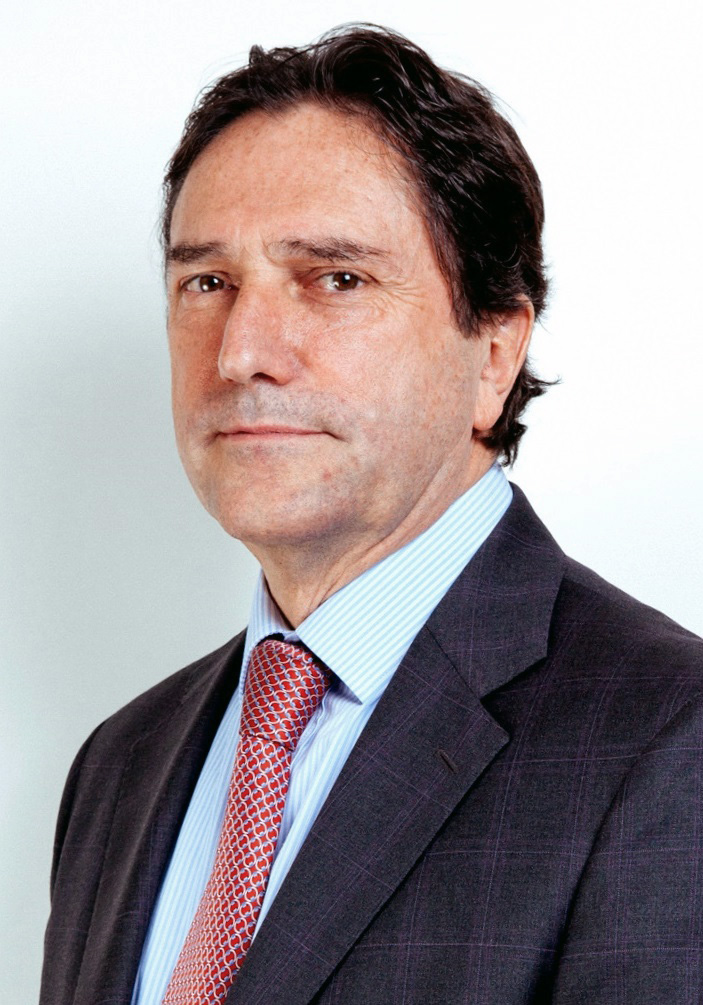

Minister of Defense
- In office 11 May 2015 – 11 March 2018
- President: Michelle Bachelet
- Preceded by: Jorge Burgos
- Succeeded by: Alberto Espina

Member of the Senate
- In office 11 March 2006 – 11 March 2014
- Preceded by: Carmen Frei
- Succeeded by: Alejandro Guillier
- Constituency: 2nd Circumscription

Minister of Justice
- In office 11 March 2014 – 11 May 2015
- President: Michelle Bachelet
- Preceded by: Patricia Pérez Goldberg
- Succeeded by: Javiera Blanco
- In office 16 December 1999 – 3 March 2003
- President: Eduardo Frei Montalva (1999–2000); Ricardo Lagos (2000–2003)
- Preceded by: Soledad Alvear
- Succeeded by: Luis Bates

Personal details
- Born: 18 December 1953 (age 72) Santiago, Chile
- Party: Radical Party of Chile
- Spouse: Ximena Passi
- Children: 4
- Education: University of Chile (LL.B)
- Profession: Lawyer

José Antonio Gómez Urrutia (born 18 December 1953) is a Chilean lawyer, Social Democrat Radical Party politician, and a former senator and president of his party. He is the former Minister of Defense and former Minister of Justice in the second Michelle Bachelet government.

A long-time member of the Radical Party (PR). He served as a Senator for the 2nd Senatorial District, representing the Antofagasta Region, between 2006 and 2014.

He also served as Minister of Justice and later as Minister of National Defense during the administrations of Presidents Eduardo Frei Ruiz-Tagle, Ricardo Lagos, and Michelle Bachelet.

== Early life and education ==
Gómez was born in Santiago on 18 December 1953. He is the youngest son of journalist José Gómez López and writer Cecilia Urrutia Concha. He is married to Ximena Passi and has four children: Matías, Joaquín, Sebastián, and Francisca.

He studied at the Instituto Nacional in Santiago and later entered the Faculty of Law of the University of Chile. In 1983, he obtained a degree in Legal and Social Sciences with a thesis titled Personal Liberty and Equality in the Chilean and Mexican Constitutions. He qualified as a lawyer on 23 January 1984.

He also completed specialization studies in Management Control, Public Policy Design, and Human Resources Development.

== Political career ==
Gómez began his political involvement in the Youth Wing of the Communist Party of Chile. Following the military coup of 11 September 1973, he was detained at several facilities, including the Air Force War Academy, the Military Academy, the National Stadium, and Santiago Penitentiary. At the age of 17, he organized a strike at the newspaper Puro Chile, which was directed by his father.

He later became a member of the Radical Party during the 1980s and joined its National Executive Committee in 1988.

In Chile's first municipal elections after the return to democracy, held on 28 June 1992, Gómez was elected municipal councilor of Las Condes for the 1992–1996 term, serving until 1994.

In 1995, he served as an advisor on penitentiary affairs to Minister of Justice Soledad Alvear. On 15 April 1996, President Eduardo Frei Ruiz-Tagle appointed him Undersecretary of Justice. On 15 December 1999, he was appointed Minister of Justice, serving until 11 March 2000. He was reappointed to the same position by President Ricardo Lagos on that date and served until 3 March 2003.

As undersecretary and later minister, Gómez was part of the team that promoted the legislative reforms that implemented Chile's Criminal Procedure Reform. He represented the Chilean government in several international forums, including the 1998 United Nations Diplomatic Conference in Rome establishing the International Criminal Court, meetings of the UN Commission on Crime Prevention and Criminal Justice in Austria, and the Inter-American Conference on Terrorism in Argentina.

=== Minister and Senator ===
During his tenure as Minister of Justice under President Lagos, Gómez led the implementation of the Criminal Procedure Reform, oversaw the enactment of the Law on Religious Freedom recognizing legal equality among religions, the abolition of the death penalty, and progress toward the new Civil Marriage Law introducing divorce with dissolution of marriage.

Gómez was elected president of the Radical Party in 2003 and served three consecutive terms (2003–2005, 2005–2007, and 2007–2009). On 26 September 2003, he was appointed a member of the National Commission on Political Imprisonment and Torture, serving until 3 March 2010.

In the 2005 parliamentary elections, Gómez was elected senator for the Antofagasta Region for the 2006–2014 term, obtaining the highest vote share with 74,572 votes (40.15%).

He ran as a presidential pre-candidate in the Concertación primaries in 2009 and again in the Nueva Mayoría primaries in 2013, on both occasions losing to Eduardo Frei Ruiz-Tagle and Michelle Bachelet, respectively.

On 24 January 2014, President Michelle Bachelet announced his appointment as Minister of Justice for her second term. He assumed office on 11 March 2014 and served until 11 May 2015, when he was appointed Minister of National Defense, a position he held until 11 March 2018.

In November 2020, Gómez was serving as a member of the Governing Council of Parliamentary Allowances for the 2018–2022 term.

In the 2021 parliamentary elections, he was a candidate for senator for the O'Higgins region, but was not elected.
