= Liceo José Victorino Lastarria, Santiago =

Coordinates: 33.4303°S 70.6208°W

Liceo José Victorino Lastarria
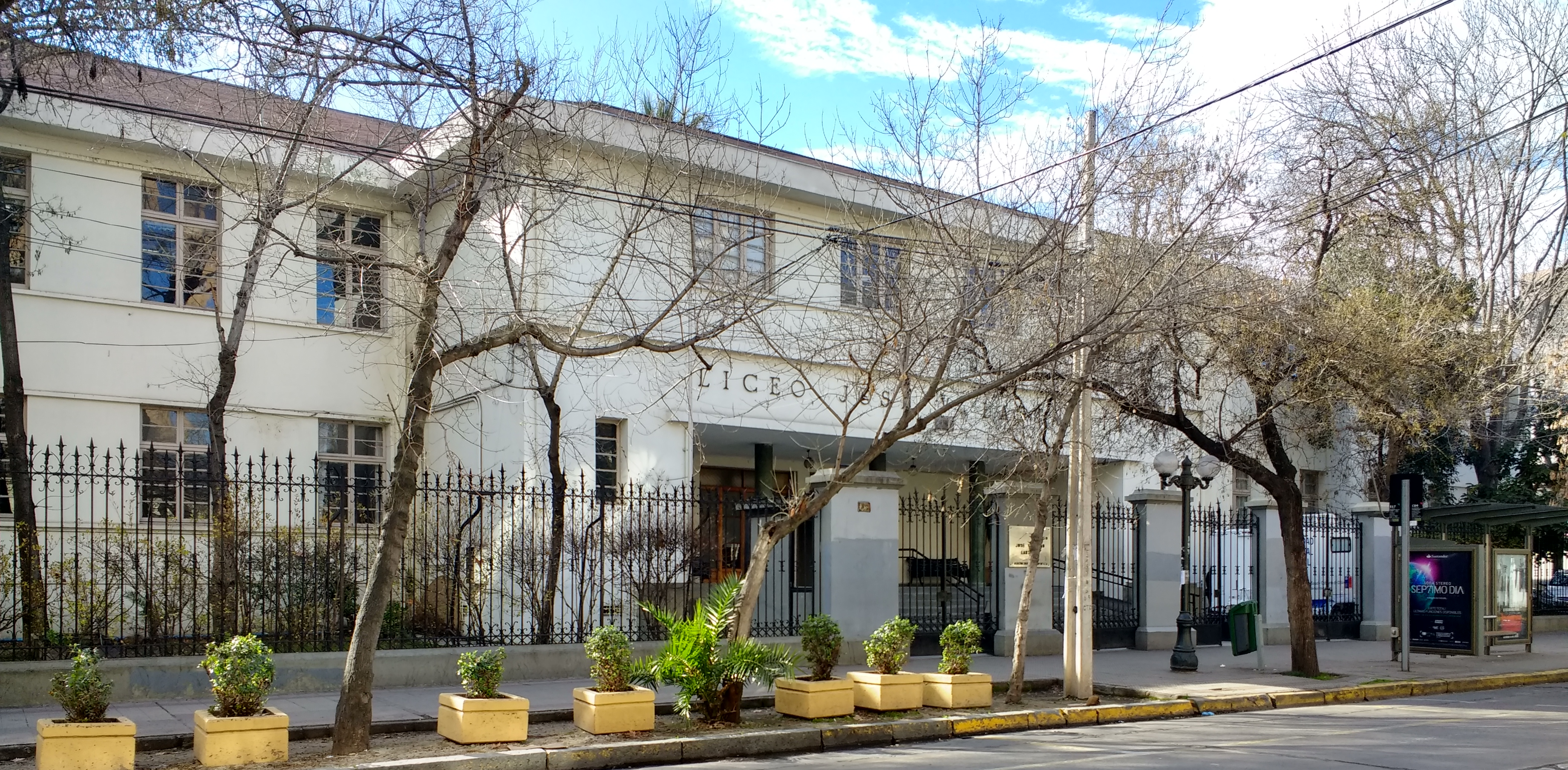
- Santiago, Chile

Information
- Type: High school
- Established: 1 June 1913

Liceo José Victorino Lastarria (English: José Victorino Lastarria High School) is a Chilean high school located in Santiago, Santiago Metropolitan Region, Chile. It was established in June 1913.
