= List of female cabinet ministers of Chile =

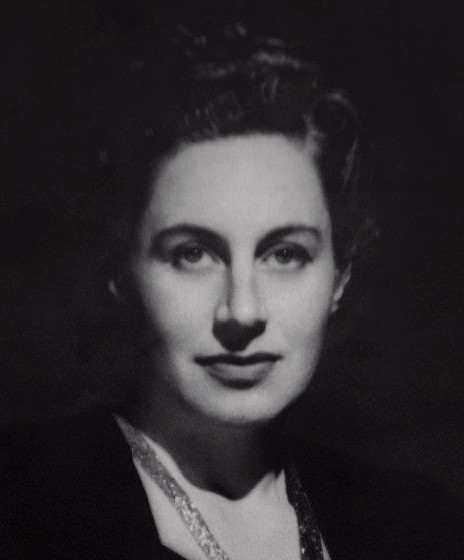
Adriana Olguín was sworn in as Minister of Justice in 1952, becoming the first female cabinet minister in Latin America.

The executive power in Chile is exercised by the president, who serves as both head of state and head of government, along with their cabinet. In 1952, Adriana Olguín became the first female cabinet minister in Latin America.

As of 2025, eighty-eight women have served as cabinet ministers in the governments of Chile. There has been at least one woman in every cabinet since March 2000, when Ricardo Lagos assumed the presidency.

Gabriel Boric's administration appointed Chile's first-ever majority-women cabinet upon taking office in 2022: fourteen women and ten men, with an average age of 49. The cabinet lost its gender parity in April 2023 but regained it in January 2025.

== List of women ministers ==
Numerical order represents the order of first appointment to the cabinet.

Denotes incumbent minister

#	Name	Office	Appointed	Left office	President / Head of Executive Power
1	Adriana Olguín	Minister of Justice	29 July 1952	3 November 1952	Gabriel González Videla
2	María Teresa del Canto	Minister of Education	3 November 1952	1 April 1953	Gabriel González Videla
3	Mireya Baltra	Minister of Labor and Social Welfare	17 June 1972	2 November 1972	Salvador Allende
4	Mónica Madariaga	Minister of Justice and Human Rights	20 April 1977	14 February 1983	Augusto Pinochet
5	Mónica Madariaga	Minister of Education	14 February 1983	19 October 1983	Augusto Pinochet
6	María Teresa Infante Barros	Minister of Labor and Social Welfare	17 August 1989	11 March 1990	Augusto Pinochet
7	Soledad Alvear	Minister of Justice and Human Rights	11 March 1994	16 December 1999	Eduardo Frei Ruiz-Tagle
8	Adriana Delpiano	Minister of National Assets	11 March 1994	13 April 1999	Eduardo Frei Ruiz-Tagle
9	Michelle Bachelet	Minister of Health	11 March 2000	7 February 2002	Ricardo Lagos
10	Mariana Aylwin	Minister of Education	11 March 2000	3 March 2003	Ricardo Lagos
11	Alejandra Krauss	Minister of Social Development and Family	11 March 2000	7 January 2002	Ricardo Lagos
12	Soledad Alvear	Minister of Foreign Affairs	11 March 2000	29 September 2004	Ricardo Lagos
13	Michelle Bachelet	Minister of National Defense	7 January 2002	29 September 2004	Ricardo Lagos
14	Cecilia Pérez Díaz	Minister of Social Development and Family	7 January 2002	3 March 2003	Ricardo Lagos
15	Sonia Tschorne (Note: Tschorne was appointed bi-minister («biministra»))	Minister of Housing and Urbanism	29 September 2004	11 March 2006	Ricardo Lagos
15	Sonia Tschorne	Minister of National Assets	29 September 2004	11 March 2006	Ricardo Lagos
16	Yasna Provoste	Minister of Social Development and Family	1 October 2004	11 March 2006	Ricardo Lagos
17	Marigen Hornkohl	Minister of Education	14 December 2005	11 March 2006	Ricardo Lagos
18	Vivianne Blanlot	Minister of National Defense	11 March 2006	26 March 2007	Michelle Bachelet
19	Patricia Poblete	Minister of Housing and Urbanism	11 March 2006	11 March 2010	Michelle Bachelet
20	Clarisa Hardy	Minister of Social Development and Family	11 March 2006	8 January 2008	Michelle Bachelet
21	Karen Poniachik	Minister of Mining	11 March 2006	8 January 2008	Michelle Bachelet
22	María Soledad Barría	Minister of Health	11 March 2006	28 October 2008	Michelle Bachelet
23	Paulina Veloso	Minister General Secretariat of the Presidency	11 March 2006	26 March 2007	Michelle Bachelet
24	Romy Schmidt	Minister of National Assets	11 March 2006	6 January 2010	Michelle Bachelet
25	Íngrid Antonijevic	Minister of Economy, Development, and Tourism	11 March 2006	14 July 2006	Michelle Bachelet
26	Yasna Provoste	Minister of Education	14 June 2006	17 April 2008	Michelle Bachelet
27	Paula Quintana	Minister of Social Development and Family	8 January 2008	11 March 2010	Michelle Bachelet
28	Marigen Hornkohl	Minister of Agriculture	10 January 2008	11 March 2010	Michelle Bachelet
29	Mónica Jiménez	Minister of Education	17 April 2008	11 March 2010	Michelle Bachelet
30	Claudia Serrano	Minister of Labor and Social Welfare	15 December 2008	11 March 2010	Michelle Bachelet
31	Carolina Tohá	Minister General Secretariat of Government	12 March 2009	14 December 2009	Michelle Bachelet
32	Pilar Armanet	Minister General Secretariat of Government	14 December 2009	11 March 2010	Michelle Bachelet
33	Jacqueline Weinstein	Minister of National Assets	6 January 2010	11 March 2010	Michelle Bachelet
34	Camila Merino	Minister of Labor and Social Welfare	11 March 2010	14 January 2011	Sebastián Piñera
35	Magdalena Matte	Minister of Housing and Urbanism	11 March 2010	19 April 2011	Sebastián Piñera
36	Ena von Baer	Minister General Secretariat of Government	11 March 2010	18 July 2011	Sebastián Piñera
37	Catalina Parot	Minister of National Assets	11 March 2010	5 November 2012	Sebastián Piñera
38	María Ignacia Benítez	Minister for the Environment	1 October 2010	11 March 2014	Sebastián Piñera
39	Evelyn Matthei	Minister of Labor and Social Welfare	16 January 2011	22 July 2013	Sebastián Piñera
40	Loreto Silva	Minister of Public Works	5 November 2012	11 March 2014	Sebastián Piñera
41	Cecilia Pérez	Minister General Secretariat of Government	5 November 2012	11 March 2014	Sebastián Piñera
42	Patricia Pérez	Minister of Justice and Human Rights	17 December 2012	11 March 2014	Sebastián Piñera
43	Carolina Schmidt	Minister of Education	22 April 2013	11 March 2014	Sebastián Piñera
44	Helia Molina	Minister of Health	11 March 2014	23 January 2015	Michelle Bachelet
45	Paulina Saball	Minister of Housing and Urbanism	11 March 2014	11 March 2018	Michelle Bachelet
46	Ximena Rincón	Minister General Secretariat of the Presidency	11 March 2014	11 May 2015	Michelle Bachelet
47	Fernanda Villegas	Minister of Social Development and Family	11 March 2014	11 May 2015	Michelle Bachelet
48	Javiera Blanco	Minister of Labor and Social Welfare	11 March 2014	11 May 2015	Michelle Bachelet
49	Natalia Riffo	Minister of Sports	11 March 2014	18 November 2016	Michelle Bachelet
50	Aurora Williams	Minister of Mining	11 March 2014	11 March 2018	Michelle Bachelet
51	Carmen Castillo	Minister of Health	23 January 2015	11 March 2018	Michelle Bachelet
52	Javiera Blanco	Minister of Justice and Human Rights	11 May 2015	19 October 2016	Michelle Bachelet
53	Ximena Rincón	Minister of Labor and Social Welfare	11 May 2015	18 November 2016	Michelle Bachelet
54	Patricia Silva (Note: Deputy minister («subrogante»))	Minister General Secretariat of the Presidency	7 June 2015	27 June 2015	Michelle Bachelet
55	Adriana Delpiano	Minister of Education	27 June 2015	11 March 2018	Michelle Bachelet
56	Claudia Pascual	Minister of Women and Gender Equality	3 June 2016	11 March 2018	Michelle Bachelet
57	Nivia Palma	Minister of National Assets	19 October 2016	11 March 2018	Michelle Bachelet
58	Alejandra Krauss	Minister of Labor and Social Welfare	18 November 2016	11 March 2018	Michelle Bachelet
59	Paula Narváez	Minister General Secretariat of Government	18 November 2016	11 March 2018	Michelle Bachelet
60	Paola Tapia	Minister of Transport and Telecommunications	14 March 2017	11 March 2018	Michelle Bachelet
61	Gloria Hutt	Minister of Transport and Telecommunications	11 March 2018	11 March 2022	Sebastián Piñera
62	Pauline Kantor	Minister of Sports	11 March 2018	28 October 2019	Sebastián Piñera
63	Alejandra Pérez	Minister of Cultures, Arts and Heritage	11 March 2018	9 August 2018	Sebastián Piñera
64	Marcela Cubillos	Minister for the Environment	11 March 2018	9 August 2018	Sebastián Piñera
65	Cecilia Pérez	Minister General Secretariat of Government	11 March 2018	28 October 2019	Sebastián Piñera
66	Susana Jiménez	Minister of Energy	11 March 2018	12 June 2019	Sebastián Piñera
67	Isabel Plá	Minister of Women and Gender Equality	11 March 2018	13 March 2020	Sebastián Piñera
68	Marcela Cubillos	Minister of Education	9 August 2018	28 February 2020	Sebastián Piñera
69	Carolina Schmidt	Minister for the Environment	9 August 2018	22 November 2021	Sebastián Piñera
70	Consuelo Valdés	Minister of Cultures, Arts and Heritage	13 August 2018	11 March 2022	Sebastián Piñera
71	María José Zaldívar	Minister of Labor and Social Welfare	28 October 2019	7 April 2021	Sebastián Piñera
72	Karla Rubilar	Minister General Secretariat of Government	28 October 2019	28 July 2020	Sebastián Piñera
73	Cecilia Pérez	Minister of Sports	28 October 2019	11 March 2022	Sebastián Piñera
74	Carolina Cuevas Merino	Minister of Women and Gender Equality	13 March 2020	6 May 2020	Sebastián Piñera
75	Macarena Santelices	Minister of Women and Gender Equality	6 May 2020	9 June 2020	Sebastián Piñera
76	Mónica Zalaquett	Minister of Women and Gender Equality	9 June 2020	11 March 2022	Sebastián Piñera
77	Karla Rubilar	Minister of Social Development and Family	28 July 2020	11 March 2022	Sebastián Piñera
78	María Emilia Undurraga	Minister of Agriculture	6 January 2021	11 March 2022	Sebastián Piñera
79	Carolina Valdivia (Note: Deputy minister («subrogante»))	Minister of Foreign Affairs	6 February 2022	11 March 2022	Sebastián Piñera
80	Maisa Rojas	Minister for the Environment	11 March 2022	11 March 2026	Gabriel Boric
81	Antonia Orellana	Minister of Women and Gender Equality	11 March 2022	11 March 2026	Gabriel Boric
82	Julieta Brodsky	Minister of Cultures, Arts and Heritage	11 March 2022	10 March 2023	Gabriel Boric
83	Alexandra Benado	Minister of Sports	11 March 2022	10 March 2023	Gabriel Boric
84	María Begoña Yarza	Minister of Health	11 March 2022	6 September 2022	Gabriel Boric
85	Jeannette Vega	Minister of Social Development and Family	11 March 2022	25 August 2022	Gabriel Boric
86	Camila Vallejo	Minister General Secretariat of Government	11 March 2022	23 December 2024	Gabriel Boric
87	Izkia Siches	Minister of the Interior	11 March 2022	6 September 2022	Gabriel Boric
88	Marcela Ríos	Minister of Justice and Human Rights	11 March 2022	7 January 2023	Gabriel Boric
89	Antonia Urrejola	Minister of Foreign Affairs	11 March 2022	10 March 2023	Gabriel Boric
90	Marcela Hernando	Minister of Mining	11 March 2022	16 August 2023	Gabriel Boric
91	Maya Fernández	Minister of National Defense	11 March 2022	10 March 2025	Gabriel Boric
92	Javiera Toro	Minister of National Assets	11 March 2022	16 August 2023	Gabriel Boric
93	Jeannette Jara	Minister of Labor and Social Welfare	11 March 2022	7 April 2025	Gabriel Boric
94	Paula Poblete	Minister of Social Development and Family	25 August 2022	6 September 2022	Gabriel Boric
95	Ximena Aguilera	Minister of Health	6 September 2022	11 March 2026	Gabriel Boric
96	Carolina Tohá	Minister of the Interior	6 September 2022	4 March 2025	Gabriel Boric
97	Ana Lya Uriarte	Minister General Secretariat of the Presidency	6 September 2022	19 April 2023	Gabriel Boric
98	Silvia Díaz	Minister of Science, Technology, Knowledge and Innovation	6 September 2022	10 March 2023	Gabriel Boric
99	Jessica López	Minister of Public Works	10 March 2023	11 March 2026	Gabriel Boric
100	Aisén Etcheverry	Minister of Science, Technology, Knowledge and Innovation	10 March 2023	22 July 2025	Gabriel Boric
101	Paula Poblete	Minister of Social Development and Family	11 August 2023	16 August 2023	Gabriel Boric
102	Marcela Sandoval	Minister of National Assets	16 August 2023	6 January 2025	Gabriel Boric
103	Aurora Williams	Minister of Mining	16 August 2023	11 March 2026	Gabriel Boric
104	Carolina Arredondo	Minister of Cultures, Arts and Heritage	16 August 2023	11 March 2026	Gabriel Boric
105	Javiera Toro	Minister of Social Development and Family	16 August 2023	11 March 2026	Gabriel Boric
106	Aisén Etcheverry (Note: Deputy minister («subrogante») as long as Camila Vallejo was on maternity leave)	Minister General Secretariat of Government	23 December 2024	9 July 2025	Gabriel Boric
107	Macarena Lobos	Minister General Secretariat of the Presidency	4 March 2025	11 March 2026	Gabriel Boric
108	Adriana Delpiano	Minister of National Defense	10 March 2025	11 March 2026	Gabriel Boric
109	Camila Vallejo	Minister General Secretariat of Government	9 July 2025	11 March 2026	Gabriel Boric
110	Ignacia Fernández	Minister of Agriculture	21 August 2025	11 March 2026	Gabriel Boric
111	Trinidad Steinert	Minister of the Interior	11 March 2026	19 May 2026	José Antonio Kast
112	Mara Sedini	Minister General Secretariat of Government	11 March 2026	19 May 2026	José Antonio Kast
113	Natalia Duco	Minister of Sports	11 March 2026	13 August 2026	José Antonio Kast
114	María Jesús Wulf	Minister of Social Development and Family	11 March 2026	Incumbent	José Antonio Kast
115	María Paz Arzola	Minister of Education	11 March 2026	Incumbent	José Antonio Kast
116	May Chomalí	Minister of Health	11 March 2026	Incumbent	José Antonio Kast
117	Catalina Parot	Minister of National Assets	11 March 2026	Incumbent	José Antonio Kast
118	Ximena Rincón	Minister of Energy	11 March 2026	Incumbent	José Antonio Kast
119	Judith Marín	Minister of Women and Gender Equality	11 March 2026	Incumbent	José Antonio Kast
120	Ximena Lincolao	Minister of Science, Technology, Knowledge and Innovation	11 March 2026	Incumbent	José Antonio Kast

== See also ==
- Women in Chile
- List of female Chilean presidential candidates
