= Loreto Seguel =

Chilean politician and civil engineer

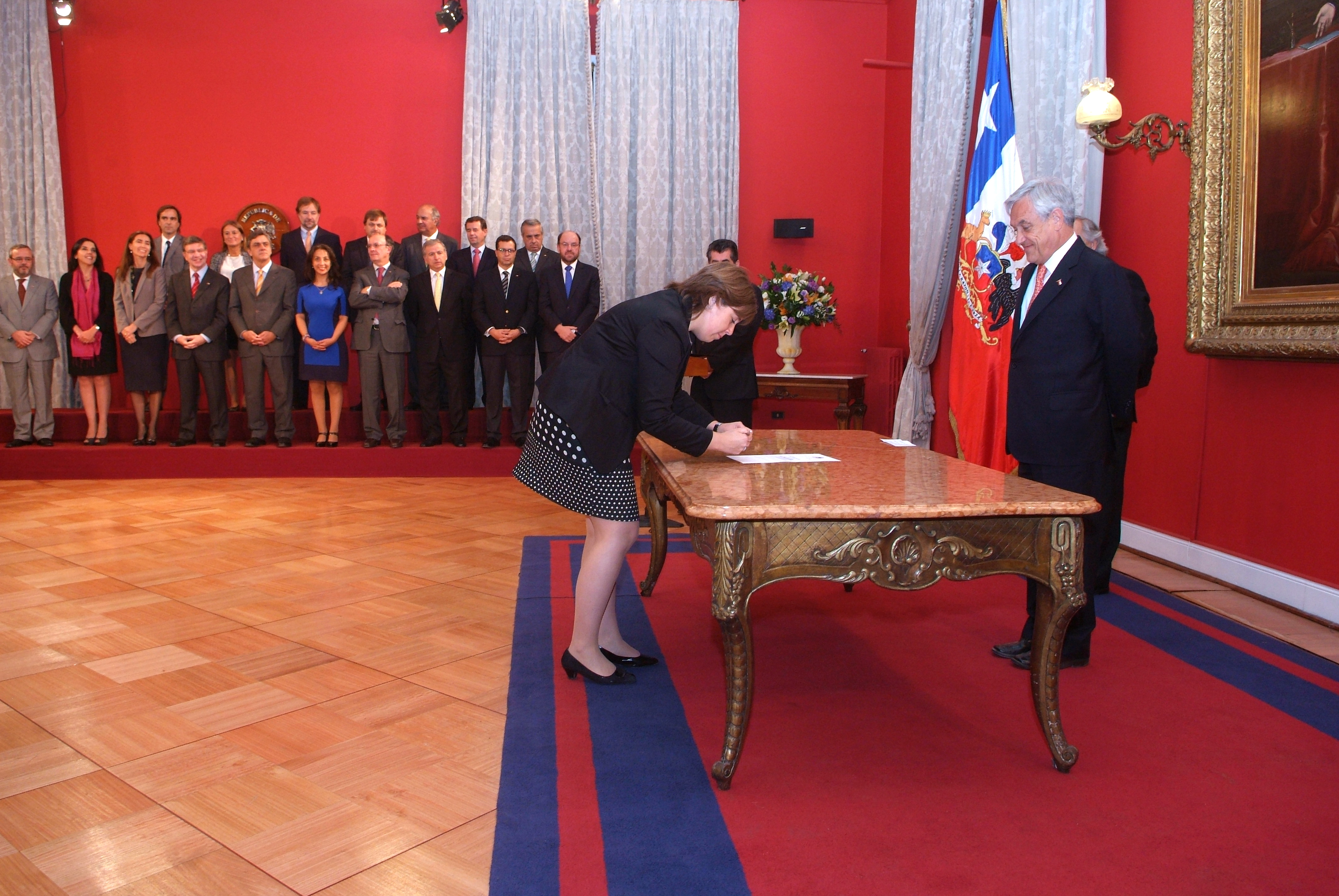
- Seguel assuming as Minister of Woman (2013)

Minister of Woman
- In office 22 April 2013 – 11 March 2014
- President: Sebastián Piñera
- Preceded by: Carolina Schmidt
- Succeeded by: Claudia Pascual

Undersecretary of Social Services
- In office 8 November 2011 – 22 April 2013
- President: Sebastián Pinera
- Preceded by: Office created
- Succeeded by: Luz Granier

Personal details
- Born: 25 October 1976 (age 49) Santiago, Chile
- Party: Independent, Close to centre-right (2002–present)
- Children: One
- Education: Pontifical Catholic University of Chile
- Occupation: Politician
- Profession: Civil engineer

Loreto Seguel King (born 25 October 1976) is a Chilean politician and civil engineer. She served as minister of woman during the first government of Sebastián Piñera.

Seguel was born in Santiago in 1976 and later lived for 12 years in Coyhaique. She holds a degree in Civil Engineering and a Master of Science in Engineering from the Pontifical Catholic University of Chile. Her professional focus has been on strategic public policy design and cross-sector coordination between the public sector, business, and trade associations.

She has developed a career in both the private and public sectors. In 2006, she was selected as an Endeavor Entrepreneur. She served as Seremi and later as Undersecretary of Social Services at the Ministry of Social Development. In 2013, she was appointed Minister Director of the National Women's Service (SERNAM).

== Public career ==
In the corporate sphere, she has served as director of both public and private companies, including Dictuc S.A., and as director and president of the Port Company of Arica.

In 2021, she was appointed by the President of the Republic as President of the Sistema de Empresas Públicas (SEP), the state holding entity that oversees strategic public companies in Chile.

Within government, she also served as advisor to the Metropolitan Regional Council (UDI caucus, 2002–2003), Regional Ministerial Secretary in the Santiago Metropolitan Region, and Executive Secretary of the Social Protection System (SEPS), both under the former Ministry of Planning and Cooperation (MIDEPLAN).

She joined the Independent Democratic Union (UDI) in 2010. On 8 November 2011, during the first administration of President Sebastián Piñera, she was appointed Undersecretary of the newly created Undersecretariat of Social Services within the Ministry of Social Development. She left that position on 22 April 2013, when she was appointed Minister Director of the National Women's Service, replacing Carolina Schmidt. She remained in office until the end of Piñera’s administration on 11 March 2014.

In 2015, she resigned from the UDI. She later ran as a mayoral candidate for the commune of Conchalí under the Chile Vamos coalition.

From 7 December 2018 until January 2021, she served as President of the Port Authority of Arica and as director of Dictuc S.A.
