= Laura Albornoz =

Chilean lawyer and politician (1946–2022)

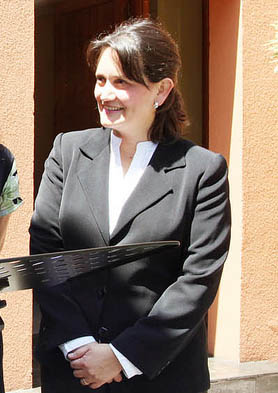

Head of the National Women's Service
- In office 11 March 2006 – 19 October 2009
- President: Michelle Bachelet
- Preceded by: Cecilia Pérez Díaz
- Succeeded by: Carmen Andrade

Personal details
- Born: 27 March 1958 (age 68) Santiago, Chile
- Party: Christian Democratic
- Spouse: Jorge Navarrete
- Children: Four
- Education: University of Chile (B.Sc)
- Occupation: Politician
- Profession: Economist

Elvira Laura Albornoz Pollmann (born 27 March 1968) is a Chilean lawyer, academic, researcher and politician.

She served as Minister of Women's Affairs (the National Women's Service) (May 2006-March 2010) during President Michelle Bachelet's first term as President of Chile. She has also served as president of the Inter-American Commission of Women.

== Family and education ==
She is the daughter of Santiago Albornoz Albornoz and Laura Elvira Pollmann Prado, both members of the Christian Democratic Party of Chile (PDC), and has three siblings. In 1992, she married Christian Democrat academic Jorge Torres Jara, who was a candidate for municipal councillor in Villa Alegre in the 2021 Chilean municipal elections.

She joined the Christian Democratic Party of Chile at the age of fourteen. She was an active participant in the Federation of Secondary Students of Santiago (FESES). She later studied at the University of Chile Faculty of Law, where she became involved with the Federation of Students of the University of Chile (FECh).

She earned a doctorate in civil law from the University of Seville, Spain, graduating summa cum laude. Her studies were funded through the Chilean Presidential Scholarship programme. She also holds a master's degree in human relations management and leadership from the Escuela Internacional de Negocios in Madrid.

== Political career ==
She served as an adviser to the national leadership of the National Women's Service (SERNAM) and later worked as technical secretary of the Disposal Commission of the Atacama Region Regional Government. Between 2002 and 2004, she returned to SERNAM as chief of staff to the institution's deputy director. She subsequently worked as a legal adviser to the National Service for Minors (SENAME).

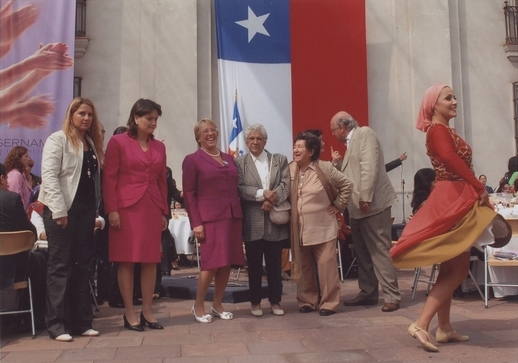
Albornoz (second from left) serving as Minister and Director of SERNAM in 2006.

On 11 March 2006, she assumed office as Minister and Director of SERNAM under President Michelle Bachelet. She also served for three years as President of the Inter-American Commission of Women (CIM/OAS). Following the 2010 Chile earthquake, she was appointed by President Bachelet as presidential delegate for the city of Constitución.

In 2012, she was a pre-candidate of the Concertación coalition for mayor of Santiago. In May 2014, during Bachelet's second administration, she was appointed to the board of directors of the state-owned National Copper Corporation of Chile (Codelco).

She was a candidate in the 2021 Constitutional Convention election for District No. 10 (Santiago, Ñuñoa, Macul, La Granja, Providencia and San Joaquín), as part of the Lista del Apruebo coalition.

On 6 August 2021, she ended nearly forty years of membership in the Christian Democratic Party, having previously chaired the party's most recent Ideological Congress. She stated that the new party leadership had disregarded more than two years of work invested in the participatory process that developed new political guidelines for addressing the challenges of a changing Chile. According to Albornoz, the leadership instead prioritised short-term electoral considerations while neglecting issues discussed by grassroots members, including abortion, feminism, the social right to housing, the circular economy, a second agrarian reform focused on water use, and other policy matters. She also cited frustration over the party's failure to condemn figures associated with corruption scandals or conduct affecting women's integrity.

In February 2023, President Gabriel Boric appointed her to the board of directors of the state-owned National Petroleum Company (ENAP).
