= Carmen Andrade =

Chilean politician

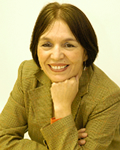

Minister of Women
- In office 20 October 2009 – 11 March 2010
- Preceded by: Laura Albornoz
- Succeeded by: Carolina Schmidt

Conucilor of Puente Alto
- In office 6 December 2012 – 6 December 2016

Personal details
- Born: 19 October 1954 (age 71) Santiago, Chile
- Party: Socialist Party (1970−present)
- Spouse(s): Juan Domingo Pavez (1980−2009)
- Children: Three
- Parent(s): Alberta del Carmen Andrade Lara; Osvaldo Andrade Andrade
- Relatives: Osvaldo Andrade (brother)
- Education: University of Chile (BA); University of Vienna (MA)
- Occupation: Politician
- Profession: Sociologist

Carmen Ximena Andrade Lara (born 19 October 1954) is a Chilean sociologist who served as minister during the first government of Michelle Bachelet (2006–2010).

== Family and education ==
She was born to Alberta del Carmen Lara Acevedo, a nursing assistant, and Osvaldo Andrade Andrade, a socialist worker who worked as a slaughterhouse inspector before serving as a municipal councillor in Puente Alto during the administration of President Eduardo Frei Montalva (1967–1970). She is the sister of Osvaldo Andrade, member of parliament and Minister of Labour and Social Welfare during the administration of Michelle Bachelet.

She studied sociology at the Pontifical Catholic University of Chile and later pursued studies in political sociology at the University of Vienna in Austria, where she lived in exile. She also holds a master's degree in government and public policy from the Latin American Faculty of Social Sciences (FLACSO).

She was married to politician Juan Domingo Pavez Hidalgo from 1980 to 2009, and is the mother of three children.

== Professional career ==
Throughout her professional career, she has worked as a consultant in various Latin American countries for the Inter-American Development Bank (IDB), the United Nations Development Programme (UNDP), and the Coordinadora de Organizaciones No Gubernamentales de Mujeres de Bolivia, focusing on gender issues and poverty reduction. She also worked at the Vicariate of Solidarity on programmes supporting social and human rights organizations.

She served as national coordinator of the Women Heads of Household programme of the National Women's Service (SERNAM) between 1991 and 2000. Until 2006, she was director of the Juvenile Criminal Responsibility Department of the National Service for Minors (SENAME), after which she joined the government as Deputy Director of SERNAM.

A member of the Socialist Party of Chile (PS) since 1970, she has participated in the party's Women's Vice-Presidency team and served on both its Central Committee and Political Commission. She became Minister and Director of the National Women's Service following the departure of Laura Albornoz in October 2009. She left the position at the end of the administration in March 2010.

In 2012, she was elected as a municipal councillor for the Santiago Metropolitan commune of Puente Alto for the 2012–2016 term.

She currently serves as Director of the Office for Equality and Gender at the University of Chile.
