= Ministry of Women and Gender Equality =

Chilean government ministry

Ministry of Women and Gender Equity
- Ministerio de la Mujer y la Equidad de Género
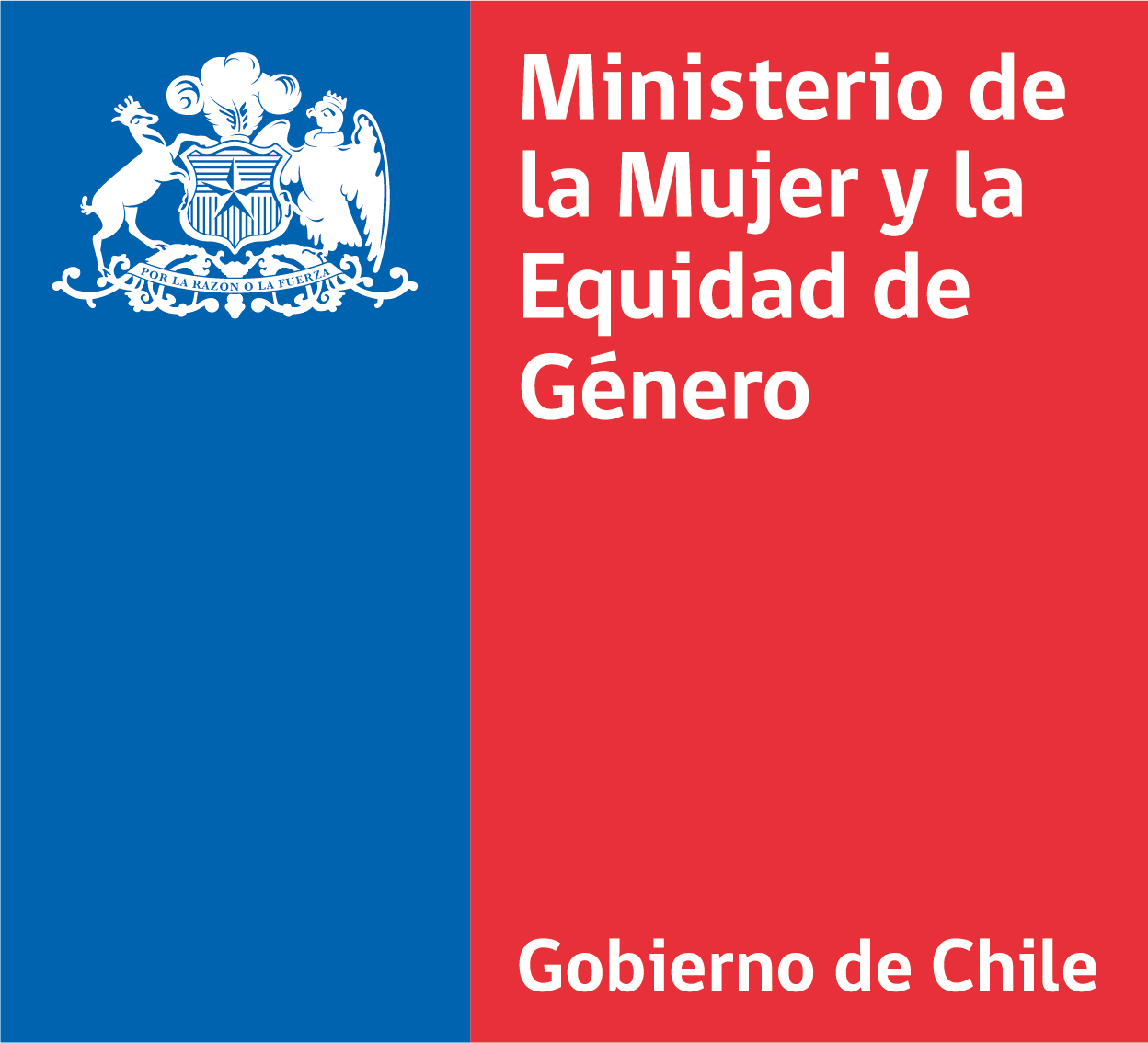

Agency overview
- Formed: 20 March 2015
- Type: Ministry
- Jurisdiction: Government of Chile
- Headquarters: Calle Cathedral, 3rd floor, Santiago
- Employees: 570 (2020)
- Annual budget: 59,656,335 CLP (2020)
- Ministers responsible: Judith Marín Morales, Minister of Women and Gender Equality; Marcia Raphael, Undersecretary of Women and Gender Equality
- Website: minmujeryeg.gob.cl

The Ministry of Women and Gender Equity (Spanish: Ministerio de la Mujer y la Equidad de Género) is a ministry of Chile responsible for assisting the President of the Republic in the design, coordination, and evaluation of policies, plans, and programs aimed at promoting gender equity, equality of rights, and the elimination of all forms of arbitrary discrimination against women. Since 11 March 2026, the minister in charge has been Judith Marín, while the corresponding undersecretary has been Marcia Raphael since 16 June 2026; both serve under José Antonio Kast's presidency.

It was created during the second government of Michelle Bachelet through Law No. 20,820, published in the Official Gazette on March 20, 2015. It began operating on June 1, 2016, in accordance with the provisions of Decree with the Force of Law (Decreto con Fuerza de Ley, DFL) No. 1, dated March 11, 2016. It did not replace the then National Women’s Service (Servicio Nacional de la Mujer, Sernam), which came under the authority of the new ministry and was renamed the National Women’s Service and Gender Equity (SernamEG).

== History ==
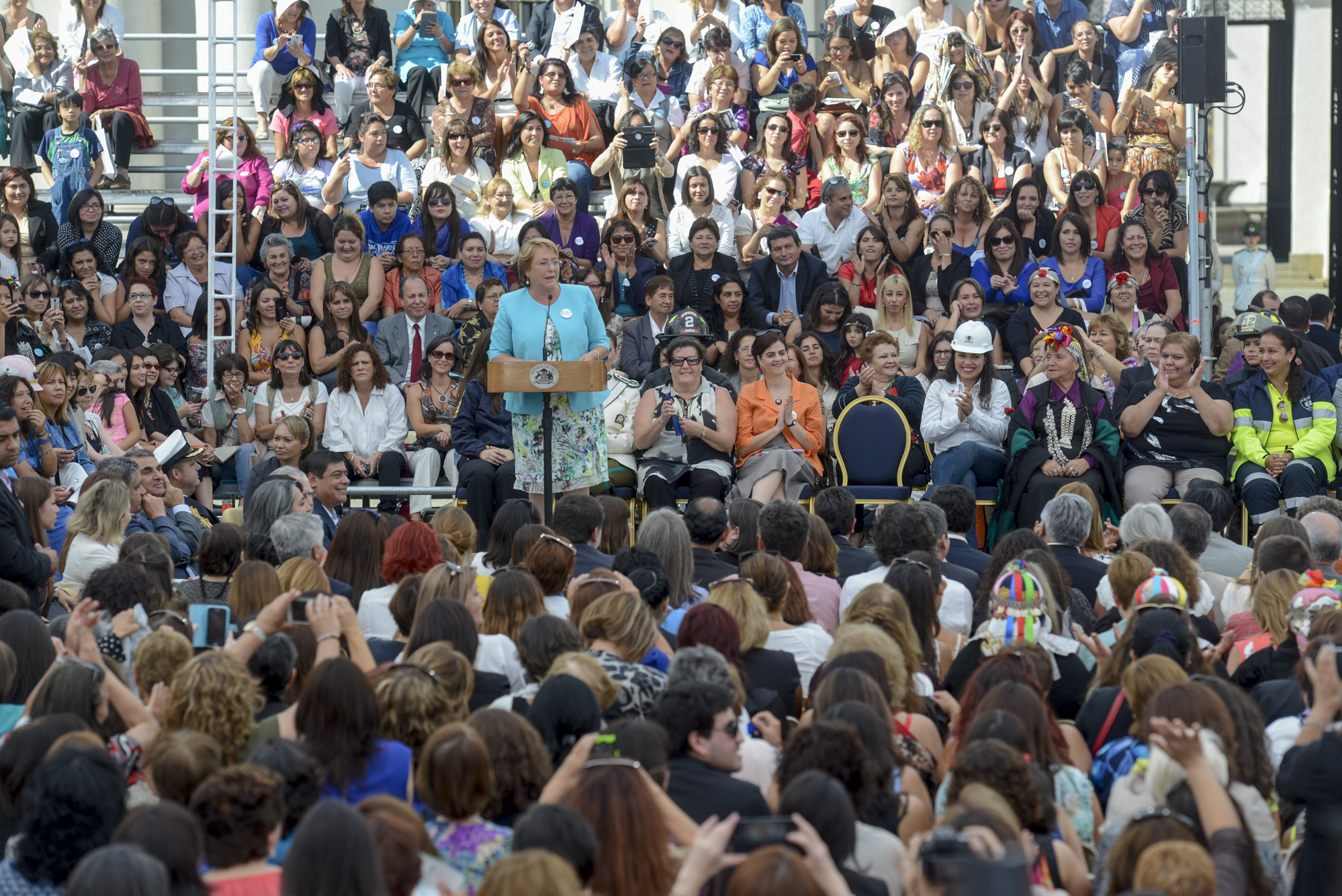
Promulgation of the law that created the ministry, by President Michelle Bachelet

The bill that led to the creation of this ministry originated as an initiative of the second government of Michelle Bachelet, who signed the message that gave rise to it on March 27, 2014, after which it was submitted to the National Congress and approved in January 2015.

This ministry was created by a law promulgated by President Michelle Bachelet on March 8, 2015, during a ceremony held in the context of International Women’s Day, and published in the Official Gazette as Law No. 20,820 on March 20, 2015. It did not replace the National Women’s Service, which came under the authority of the new ministry and was renamed the National Women’s Service and Gender Equity.

According to the transitional provisions of the law that created this ministry—Law No. 20,820— within one year from the date of its publication, the president was required to determine, by means of one or more decrees with the force of law (DFL), issued through the Ministry of Social Development and also signed by the Minister of Finance, the date or dates for the entry into force of the permanent provisions of the law, the staffing structures it established, the transfer and classification of personnel, and the commencement of activities of the Ministry of Women and Gender Equity. On March 11, 2016, DFL No. 1 was promulgated and published in the Official Gazette in April 2016, establishing that the date of entry into force of the permanent provisions of Law No. 20,820, the staffing structures set out in Articles 1 and 3 of said DFL, and the commencement of activities of the Ministry of Women and Gender Equity would be the first day of the month following its publication—namely, June 1, 2016.

The first Minister of Women and Gender Equity, Claudia Pascual—then director of Sernam was appointed by President Michelle Bachelet on June 3, 2016.

== Functions ==
This ministry, acting as the governing body, must ensure the coordination, consistency, and coherence of policies, plans, and programs on gender equity, which are to be incorporated transversally across the actions of the State. It is responsible for planning and developing policies and special measures with cultural relevance aimed at promoting equal rights and opportunities between men and women, seeking to eliminate all forms of arbitrary discrimination based on gender, ensuring the full participation of women in cultural, political, economic, and social spheres, as well as the exercise of their human rights and fundamental freedoms. It must also ensure compliance with the obligations contained in international treaties ratified by Chile on these matters and currently in force.

== Organisations ==
The ministry is organised as follows:

=== Minister of Women and Gender Equity ===
The Minister of Women and Gender Equity is in charge of the senior leadership of this ministry and the functions established in Article 3 of Law No. 20.820. The minister also exercises the political leadership of the Ministry and acts as the immediate collaborator of the President of the Republic in the development of policies, plans, and programs aimed at gender equity, equality of rights, and the elimination of arbitrary discrimination against women. In particular, the minister is responsible for:

- Proposing policies, plans, and programs within the areas of competence of the Ministry.
- Proposing and promoting legislative initiatives aimed at gender equity, equality of rights, and the elimination of arbitrary discrimination against women.
- Ensuring compliance with the regulations issued within the scope of the Ministry’s authority.
- Ensuring compliance with international treaties on women’s human rights and gender equity ratified by Chile and currently in force, especially those related to the elimination of all forms of arbitrary discrimination and violence against women.
- Leading cooperation actions with international organizations dedicated to women’s human rights and gender equity, without prejudice to the powers of the Ministry of Foreign Affairs; and presiding over the Interministerial Committee for Equality of Rights and Gender Equity.
- Appointing the members of the Advisory Council (AC), which provides advice on matters of equality of rights and gender equity.
- Delegating, by reasoned resolution, the exercise of its powers to the undersecretary, division heads, or other officials under its authority, in accordance with Article 41 of Law No. 18.575.
- Exercising permanent hierarchical control within its sphere of competence, through appropriate coordination with the undersecretary; and performing all other functions assigned by law.

=== Interministerial Committee ===
The Interministerial Committee is a body whose function is to collaborate in the implementation of policies, plans, and programs aimed at equality of rights between women and men, incorporating a gender perspective into the actions of the State.

The Committee serves as a mechanism for coordination, information-sharing, guidance, and agreement on public policies in this area. It is composed of: (Note: The Undersecretariat for Women and Gender Equity acts as the executive secretariat of the Committee)

- The Minister of Women and Gender Equity, who presides over it.
- The Minister of the Interior and Public Security.
- The Minister of National Defense.
- The Minister of Finance.
- The Minister Secretary-General of the Presidency.
- The Minister of Economy, Development, and Tourism.
- The Minister of Social Development and Family.
- The Minister of Education.
- The Minister of Justice and Human Rights.
- The Minister of Labor and Social Welfare.
- The Minister of Health.
- The Minister of Agriculture.
- The Minister of Housing and Urbanism.
- The Minister of Cultures, Arts, and Heritage.

=== Advisory Council ===
The Advisory Council (AC) brings together all officials of the Ministry. It is chaired by the Minister for Women and Gender Equity.

=== Undersecretariat for Women and Gender Equity ===
The Undersecretariat for Women and Gender Equity of Chile is a state undersecretariat under the Ministry for Women and Gender Equity, which is responsible for assisting the President of the Republic in the design, coordination, and evaluation of policies, plans, and programs aimed at promoting gender equity, equality of rights, and the elimination of all forms of arbitrary discrimination against women. As such, the head of the Undersecretariat is tasked with acting as the direct collaborator, advisor, and substitute (in the event of a vacancy) of the Minister of the portfolio. Since March 28, 2025, the Undersecretary has been Claudia Donaire Gaete.

=== Regional Secretariats ===
The Ministry oversees 16 Regional Ministerial Secretariats (Secretaría regional ministerial, SEREMIs) for Women and Gender Equity.

List by Region:

- Arica and Parinacota Region: Camila Andrea Roberts Azócar
- Tarapacá Region: Noemí Salinas Polanco
- Antofagasta Region: Hanna Goldener Callejas
- Atacama Region: Marcela Araya
- Coquimbo Region: María Fernanda Glaser Danton
- Valparaíso Region: Camila Constanza Lazo Molina
- Metropolitan Region of Santiago: Ana Raquel Martínez Camorro
- O’Higgins Region: Nicolle Astrid del Río Vilches
- Maule Region: Claudia Morales
- Ñuble Region: Information not available
- Biobío Region: Lorena Segura
- Araucanía Region: Information not available
- Los Ríos Region: Information not available
- Los Lagos Region: Macarena Gré Briones
- Aysén Region of General Carlos Ibáñez del Campo: Andrea Méndez Valenzuela
- Magallanes and Chilean Antarctic Region: Sylvia Ruiz

=== National Service for Women and Gender Equity ===
The National Service for Women and Gender Equity (SernamEG) is a functionally decentralized public service with its own legal personality and assets, responsible for implementing the policies, plans, and programs entrusted to it by the Ministry for Women and Gender Equity.

=== Departments ===
The Ministry includes the following departments:

- Communications Department (Departamento de Comunicaciones)
- Legal Reforms Department (Departamento de Reformas Legales)
- International Relations Department (Departamento de Relaciones Internacionales)
- Audit Department (Departamento de Auditoría)

=== Divisions ===
It also has five divisions under its authority:

- Legal Division (División Jurídica)
- Equality Policy Division (División de Política de Igualdad)
- Gender Studies and Training Division (División de Estudios y Capacitación en Género)
- Planning and Management Control Division (División de Planificación y Control de Gestión)
- Administration and Finance Division (División de Administración y Finanzas)

== List of representatives ==
Minister	Party	Term start	Term end	President
Claudia Pascual	PC	3 June 2016	11 March 2018	Michelle Bachelet
Isabel Plá	UDI	11 March 2018	13 March 2020	Sebastián Piñera
Carolina Cuevas Merino	RN	13 March 2020	6 May 2020	Sebastián Piñera
Macarena Santelices	UDI	6 May 2020	9 June 2020	Sebastián Piñera
Mónica Zalaquett	UDI	9 June 2020	11 March 2022	Sebastián Piñera
Antonia Orellana	CS	11 March 2022	11 March 2026	Gabriel Boric
Judith Marín	Ind.	11 March 2026	Incumbent	José Antonio Kast

== See also ==
- List of female cabinet ministers of Chile
