= Macarena Santelices =

Chilean politician and journalist

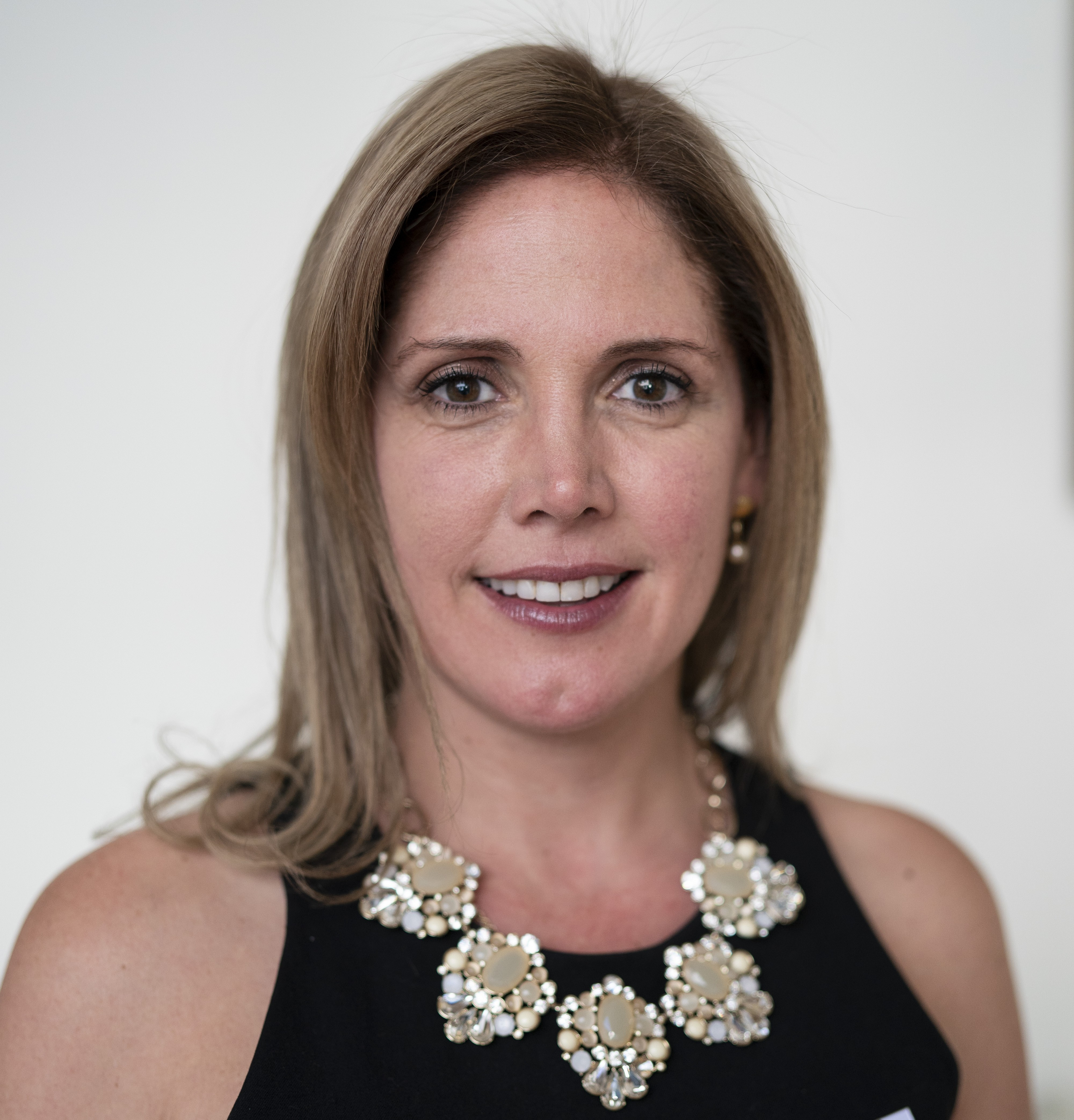
- Official portrait (2020)

Member of the Chamber of Deputies
- Incumbent
- Assumed office 11 March 2026

Minister of Woman
- In office 6 May 2020 – 9 June 2020
- President: Sebastián Piñera
- Preceded by: Carolina Cuevas Merino
- Succeeded by: Mónica Zalaquett

Mayor of Olmué
- In office 6 December 2012 – 25 October 2019
- Preceded by: Tomás Aranda Miranda
- Succeeded by: Jorge Jil

Councilwoman of Olmué
- In office 6 December 2008 – 6 December 2012

Personal details
- Born: 15 August 1977 (age 49) Vina del Mar, Chile
- Party: Republican
- Other political affiliations: UDI
- Spouse: Leonardo Prieto
- Children: 2
- Parent(s): Luis Santelices Barrera (father); Ana Eugenia Cañas Pinochet (mother)
- Relatives: Augusto Pinochet (great uncle)
- Education: University of Viña del Mar (BA); University of Alcalá (MA)
- Occupation: Journalist • Politician

Macarena Eugenia Santelices Cañas (Viña del Mar, Valparaíso Region, 15 August 1977) is a Chilean journalist, television presenter, and politician, and a member of the Republican Party of Chile (PRCh).

She served as Minister of Woman and Gender Equality during the second government of Sebastián Piñera, between 6 May and 9 June 2020. Previously, she served as mayor of Olmué (2012–2019) and as a municipal councillor of the same commune (2008–2012).

== Family and education ==
She is the daughter of Luis Santelices Barrera, who served as mayor of Los Andes between 1986 and 1989, and Ana Eugenia Cañas Pinochet. She is a great-niece of General Augusto Pinochet.

She studied for a bachelor's degree in Communication Sciences at the University of Viña del Mar, qualifying as a journalist. She later obtained a master’s degree in Communication from the University of Alcalá in Spain.

In 2012, she married screenwriter and director Leonardo Lalo Prieto, with whom she has two children.

== Professional career ==
The beginning of her television career dates back to 2000. While in her fourth year of journalism studies, she began as host of the program Interconsulta on the Viña del Mar-based channel QBC, which broadcast on the pay television platform of VTR.

In 2001, she completed her professional internship at Mega, collaborating in the coverage of the parliamentary elections held that year.

After graduating, she became a newsreader for Página Uno on UCV Televisión during January and February 2002, replacing journalist Andrea Canala-Echevarría. Months later, she joined La Red, where she was in charge of the closing edition of the newscast Telediario, a role she held until the end of 2002.

In 2003, she returned to Mega as a reporter for programs such as Hola Andrea, Morandé con compañía, Mekano, Siempre contigo, and Mucho gusto, among others. During the tour of the 2003 Teletón, she was crowned “Queen of the Tour”.

Her time at Mega lasted until 2005, when she moved to Canal 13 to become a permanent panelist on the program Tarde libre, where she hosted a health segment titled “From Head to Toe”, which ended in December 2005.

After a hiatus from television beginning in 2006, when she assumed office as a councillor, she returned in 2010 as anchor of the main newscast of UCV Televisión Noticias, remaining until 2012, when she took over the afternoon edition. Later that year, she left television to dedicate herself to her candidacy for mayor of Olmué.

== Political career ==
Santelices was a member of the Independent Democratic Union (UDI), a party she joined in 1995, motivated by her positive assessment of the former military dictatorship. In 2016, she stated in La Tercera that “one must recognize all the good that the military government did”.

In 2020, during a television program, she questioned the use of the term dictatorship, stating that “when people on the right, including those who participated in the military government and the Armed Forces, now speak of dictatorship, that already seems excessive to me (...) is there any dictatorship in the world that handed over power through a democratic process, which was the Yes and No?, is there any other dictatorship in the world that handed over power peacefully, through a plebiscite?”.

Within the UDI, she served as vice president and treasurer.

In the 2008 municipal elections, she ran as a councillor for Olmué, obtaining the highest vote share in the commune with 8.69%, and served until 6 December 2012, when the term ended. In the 2012 municipal elections, she was elected mayor of the same commune and was re-elected in the 2016 municipal elections. In that role, she was elected vice president of the Chilean Association of Municipalities (AChM) in March 2019.

On 13 October 2019, she resigned from her position as mayor to run for the office of regional governor in the then incoming election, with the resignation taking effect on 24 October. Nevertheless, on 5 May 2020, President Sebastián Piñera appointed her Minister of Women and Gender Equality, a post that had been vacant since 13 March following the resignation of Isabel Plá. She assumed office the following day.

Her appointment generated controversy within the opposition and civil society due to past statements in favor of the military dictatorship and others against migrants.

Additionally, complaints were filed against her alleging that she concealed a case of sexual harassment—during her tenure as mayor of Olmué—against a primary school teacher by the principal of a local school, as well as for mistreatment of female municipal workers and unlawful dismissals.

As minister, she was also criticized for a controversial advertising campaign that, according to critics, “relativized gender-based violence and favored the aggressor”.

She later appointed Jorge Ruz, former director of the newspaper La Cuarta and organizer of the so-called “piscinazo” of the Queen of the Viña del Mar International Song Festival, an activity considered sexist, as head of the Studies Division of the Ministry of Women and Gender Equality.

On 9 June 2020, after only 34 days in office, she submitted her resignation from the ministry, amid a wave of criticism summarized by the phrase “We have no minister”, which circulated in official media and social networks.

In August 2021, she joined the presidential campaign of José Antonio Kast as a spokesperson for the November 2021 election, rejecting offers from the UDI and National Renewal to run as a candidate for the Chamber of Deputies of Chile in the parliamentary elections.
