= Ximena Rincón =

Chilean politician

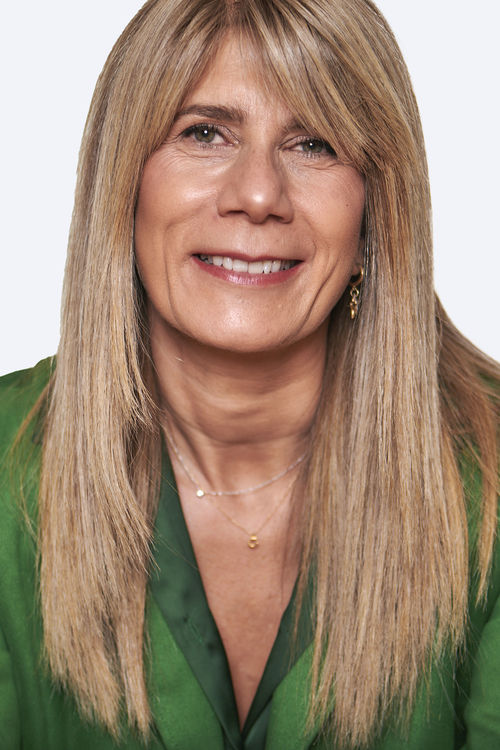

Minister of Energy
- Incumbent
- Assumed office 11 March 2026
- President: José Antonio Kast
- Preceded by: Álvaro García Hurtado

President of the Senate of Chile
- In office 25 August 2021 – 11 March 2022
- Preceded by: Yasna Provoste
- Succeeded by: Álvaro Elizalde

Minister of Labor and Social Providence
- In office 11 May 2015 – 18 November 2016
- President: Michelle Bachelet
- Preceded by: Javiera Blanco
- Succeeded by: Alejandra Krauss

Minister Secretary-General of the Presidency of Chile
- In office 11 March 2014 – 11 May 2015
- President: Michelle Bachelet
- Preceded by: Cristián Larroulet
- Succeeded by: Jorge Insunza

Member of the Senate of Chile
- In office 11 March 2018 – 11 March 2026
- Preceded by: Constituency established
- Succeeded by: Beatriz Sánchez
- Constituency: 9th District
- In office 11 March 2010 – 11 March 2014
- Preceded by: Jaime Naranjo
- Succeeded by: Manuel Matta Aragay
- Constituency: 11th District

Intendant of the Santiago Metropolitan Region
- In office 27 January 2005 – 11 March 2006
- President: Ricardo Lagos
- Preceded by: Marcelo Trivelli
- Succeeded by: Víctor Barrueto

Superintendent of Social Security of Chile
- In office 11 March 2000 – 26 January 2005
- President: Ricardo Lagos
- Preceded by: Luis Orlandini Molina
- Succeeded by: Javier Fuenzalida Santander

Personal details
- Born: 5 July 1968 (age 58) Concepción, Chile
- Party: Democrats (since 2022)
- Other political affiliations: PDC (1982–2022)
- Spouse: Juan Carlos Latorre (m. 1989; div. 2011)
- Children: 3
- Relatives: Ricardo Rincón González (brother); Mónica Rincón (sister)
- Education: University of Concepción; University of Chile
- Occupation: Lawyer • Politician
- Awards: Order of Isabella the Catholic (2014)

Ximena Cecilia Rincón González (born 5 July 1967) is a Chilean lawyer and politician. She served as a cabinet minister during the second government of President Michelle Bachelet, holding the positions of Minister Secretary-General of the Presidency (2014–2015) and Minister of Labor and Social Providence (2015–2016). Later, she was elected senator for the Maule Region (2018–2026) and served as President of the Senate from August 2021 to March 2022.

She began her political career at the age of fourteen by joining the youth leadership of the Christian Democratic Party (DC). She went on to hold positions in public administration, including Superintendent of Social Security (2000–2005) and Intendant of the Santiago Metropolitan Region (2005–2006). In the legislative sphere, she was senator for the 11th constituency (Southern Maule) between 2010 and 2014 before joining the cabinet. During her second term as senator, she has chaired key committees such as Economy, Finance, Science, and Budget.

Her break with the DC came in 2022, when she publicly declared her support for the "Reject" option in the constitutional plebiscite — contradicting the official stance of her party. The decision sparked strong internal controversy and led to her resignation after decades of membership.

She later co-founded the party Demócratas along with other centrist figures, establishing herself as a leading critic of the direction taken by the Gabriel Boric government and the constitutional process led by the Broad Front and Communist Party.

== Political career ==
=== Early years ===
Ximena Rincón began her political career at the age of 14 while still in high school, when she joined the youth leadership of the Christian Democratic Party (PDC). She also took part in opposition activities against Pinochet regime. During her university years, she emerged as a student leader.

In the 1988 Chilean national plebiscite, she participated in the campaign known as the "Crusade for Citizen Participation".

From 1998 to 2000, she served as Executive Vice President of the Foundation for the Promotion and Development of Women (Prodemu), during the presidency of Eduardo Frei Ruiz-Tagle. Under President Ricardo Lagos, she was appointed Superintendent of Social Security, a position she held from March 11, 2000, to January 26, 2005. During that time, she represented the Chilean government before the International Labour Organization (ILO) and took part in the Occupational Health Congress held in Rome in November 2004.

On January 27, 2005, she was appointed Intendant of the Santiago Metropolitan Region (RM), becoming the first woman to hold that position. She served until March 11, 2006. As Intendant, in May 2005, she represented the RM at the Metropolis Assembly held in Berlin, Germany.

She has served as Vice President of the PDC during Soledad Alvear's presidency in 2006. She was also president of the Center for Development Studies (CED) –a think tank aligned with the Concertación coalition– and a member of the Comunidad Mujer Council.

=== Senator (2010–2014) ===
In 2008, Rincón sought the PDC's nomination to run for mayor of Santiago; the candidacy ultimately went to party colleague Jaime Ravinet, who was defeated by Pablo Zalaquett (UDI).

In the 2009–10 Chilean general election, she ran for Senate representing the 11th District (Maule South) for the 2010–2018 term, and was elected with 31.03% of the vote. She served on the permanent committees for Agriculture; Future Challenges, Science, Technology and Innovation; Finance; Mining and Energy; Labor and Social Security; and the Joint Budget Committee, as well as several budget subcommittees.

She left her Senate seat in March 2014 upon her appointment as a cabinet minister. She was succeeded by Manuel Antonio Matta, following a PDC primary held on April 27, 2014.

=== Cabinet Minister (2014–2016) ===
On January 24, 2014, President-elect Michelle Bachelet appointed Rincón as Ministry General Secretariat of the Presidency. She assumed the position on March 11, 2014. In May 2015, during Bachelet's first cabinet Minister of Labor and Social Welfare, in the midst of the legislative debate on the Labor Reform. She held the position until November 18, 2016, when she was succeeded by Alejandra Krauss.

=== Senator (2018–2026) ===
In the 2017 parliamentary elections, she ran for Senate in the 9th District (Maule Region) for the 2018–2026 term, winning 38,750 votes (10.48% of valid votes cast).

Since March 21, 2018, she has served on the Economy Committee, which she chaired until March 13, 2019. She also sits on the Maritime Interests, Fisheries and Aquaculture Committee (which she has chaired since May 15, 2020) and the Agriculture Committee. Since April 11, 2018, she has served on the Joint Budget Committee.

Since April 3, 2018, she has also served on the Special Committee on Children and Adolescents, which she has chaired since March 12, 2019.

On December 23, 2020, Rincón registered her presidential pre-candidacy to represent the PDC in the internal primary held on January 24, 2021. She won that primary, but the party ultimately selected Yasna Provoste as its presidential candidate.

On August 25, 2021, following Provoste's resignation to run for president, the PDC board appointed Rincón as President of the Senate, making her the fourth woman in Chilean history to hold that office. She stepped down on March 11, 2022, the same day she began serving on the Future Challenges, Science, Technology and Innovation Committee, as well as the Foreign Relations Committee.

=== Leader of Demócratas ===
On October 27, 2022, she announced her resignation from the PDC, ending a 40-year affiliation. On November 2, 2022, she, along with fellow former senator Matías Walker and other ex-members of centrist parties, founded a new political party called Demócratas. In November 2025, the party received an order of dissolution after failing to reach the minimum vote threshold in parliamentary elections.
