= Enrique Krauss =

Chilean politician (1932–2026)

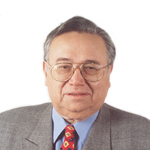

Member of the Chamber of Deputies
- In office 11 March 1998 – 11 March 2002
- Preceded by: Jorge Schaulsohn
- Succeeded by: Carolina Tohá
- In office 15 May 1973 – 11 September 1973
- Succeeded by: Dissolution of the charge
- Constituency: 21st Departmental Group (Temuco, Lautaro, Imperial, Pitrufquén and Villarrica)

Minister of the Interior
- In office 11 March 1990 – 11 March 1994
- President: Patricio Aylwin
- Preceded by: Carlos Cáceres Contreras
- Succeeded by: Germán Correa

Ministry of Economy, Development and Tourism
- In office 30 September 1968 – 5 September 1969
- President: Eduardo Frei Montalva
- Preceded by: Juan de Dios Carmona
- Succeeded by: Carlos Figueroa Serrano

Undersecretary of the Interior
- In office 10 August 1966 – 30 September 1968
- President: Eduardo Frei Ruíz-Tagle
- Preceded by: Juan Hamilton
- Succeeded by: Juan Achurra Larraín

Personal details
- Born: 8 January 1932 Valdivia, Chile
- Died: 10 July 2026 (aged 94) Santiago, Chile
- Party: National Falange; Christian Democratic Party
- Spouse(s): Gabriela Valle (divorced); Bárbara Cuadra
- Children: Four (including Alejandra)
- Parent(s): Ananías Krauss Ramos; Mercedes Rusque Adrián
- Education: University of Chile (LL.B)
- Profession: Lawyer

Juan Enrique Krauss Rusque (25 January 1932 − 10 July 2026) was a Chilean lawyer and politician who served as deputy, minister and ambassador of Chile to Spain, Ecuador and the Czech Republic.

In 1966, Krauss began his political career working for the State, which allowed him to rise once Eduardo Frei Montalva appointed him in 1968 as Ministry of Economy, Development and Reconstruccion. From 1971 to 1975, he was a member of the national board of his party as well as national councilor of it (1976−1989). The first office aforementioned helped him to be elected for the Chamber of Deputies for the period 1973−77, which was disrupted by the coup against Salvador Allende.

With democracy's return to Chile, in the early 1990s he was the Minister of Interior of Patricio Aylwin. Similarly, he was deputy (1998−2002) and failed to reach a seat the Senate in 2001. After that, both Ricardo Lagos and Michelle Bachelet appointed him as a diplomat in South American and European countries.

== Political career ==
=== Rising: 1966−1989 ===
Due to his career in the Ministry of the Interior during Eduardo Frei Montalva's Christian-democratic government (1964−1970), Krauss was appointed by him as Undersecretary of the Interior on 10 August 1966. Then, he rose when Frei appointed him as Minister of Economy, Development and Reconstruction, in which stayed for a brief period from 1968 to 1969.

In that way, in 1970, he was appointed national as head of Radomiro Tomic's presidential campaign, who was defeated by the Marxist candidate Salvador Allende. However, during Allende's government Krauss was a member of the National Television Council (CNTV; 1971−73) until his participation in the 1973 Parliamentary elections, where was elected as a deputy for the 21st Departmental Group of Temuco, Lautaro, Nueva Imperial, Pitrufquén and Villarrica for the legislative period 1973−77 (disrupted by Augusto Pinochet's coup d'état). Similarly, in that election he was elected with the third majority behind Rosendo Huenumán and Hardy Momberg.

After the 11 September coup, he was an opponent of Pinochet's military dictatorship and played a role as human rights lawyer in representation of the Vicariate of Solidarity (1976−90).

=== Concertación governments: 1990−2010 ===
Once the Pinochet dictatorship ended, he was appointed by Patricio Aylwin as Minister of the Interior, office he performed during the whole 1990−94 period. Nevertheless, he had to face such complex episodes as the assassination of UDI senator Jaime Guzmán or the "Boinazo": a "liaison exercise" that the Chilean Army realized near the Moneda Palace, which included commandos with war weapons surrounding the building.

After leaving the government, he worked in the legal area of Telefónica Chile, he was elected president of his party (1997) and also was elected deputy for the 1998−2002 period. However, in 1999, he resigned from the position after Andrés Zaldívar's crushing defeat in the Concertación primary elections, where the winner was Ricardo Lagos (PPD) with 71% of the votes.

With Lagos already elected, in the Congress Krauss was a member of the Permanent Commission of Constitution, Legislation and Justice as well as of the Economy, Development and Reconstruction Commission. Later, in the 2001 parliamentary election, he ran for a seat in the Senate in representation of the Tarapacá Region, but he failed to reach it after losing against the then PPD Fernando Flores and three other contenders.

During the rest of the 2000s, he was appointed ambassador by the presidencies of Lagos (2000−06) and Michelle Bachelet (2006−10), who respectively sent him to Spain and Ecuador. Likewise, in 2009, he was appointed by Bachelet as Ambassador of Chile to the Czech Republic.

== Personal life and death ==
Krauss was a supporter of Colo-Colo.

As of 2010, he was retired from active politics. He died in July 2026, at the age of 94.
