= Adriana Delpiano =

Chilean politician (born 1947)

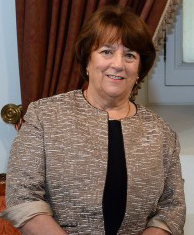

Minister of National Defense of Chile
- In office 10 March 2025 – 11 March 2026
- President: Gabriel Boric
- Preceded by: Maya Fernández
- Succeeded by: Fernando Barros

Minister of Education
- In office 27 June 2015 – 11 March 2018
- President: Michelle Bachelet
- Preceded by: Nicolás Eyzaguirre
- Succeeded by: Gerardo Varela

Intendant of the Santiago Metropolitan Region
- In office 22 January 2007 – 7 January 2008
- President: Michelle Bachelet
- Preceded by: Víctor Barrueto
- Succeeded by: Álvaro Erazo

Head Ministry of the National Women's Service
- In office 11 March 2000 – 7 January 2002
- President: Ricardo Lagos
- Preceded by: Josefina Bilbao
- Succeeded by: Cecilia Pérez Díaz

Minister of National Assets
- In office 11 March 1994 – 13 April 1999
- President: Eduardo Frei Ruíz-Tagle
- Preceded by: Luis Alvarado Constenla
- Succeeded by: Jorge Heine

Personal details
- Born: 27 February 1947 (age 79) Santiago, Chile
- Party: Popular Unitary Action Movement (1969–1973); Party for Democracy (1987–)
- Spouse(s): José Valenzuela (div.); Francisco Pérez
- Children: Two
- Education: Pontifical Catholic University of Chile
- Profession: Social worker

Adriana Delpiano Puelma (born 27 February 1947) is a Chilean politician. From 27 June 2015 to 11 March 2018 she was the Minister of Education of Chile in the cabinet of Michelle Bachelet. Formerly, she was Intendant of the Santiago Metropolitan Region (Intendenta de la Región Metropolitana). She received a degree in Social Work from the Pontifical Catholic University of Chile, and earned her Masters of Education Science from the Center for Advanced Studies (Centro de Estudios Avanzados) in Mexico. Delpiano serves since March 2025 as the Minister of National Defense of Chile.

Delpiano served as Researcher and Director of the Interdisciplinary Program of Research in Education and as professor at the Universidad Católica de Chile.

An activist for the Partido por la Democracia, in 1994 Delpiano was named Minister of National Assets (Ministra de Bienes Nacionales). She left the ministry in 1999 in order to work as the assistant executive director for the presidential campaign of Ricardo Lagos. Delpiano, a personal friend of President Ricardo Lagos, was named Director-Minister of the National Women's Service (SERNAM), making its primary work on the issues of divorce and domestic violence. She left the ministry in 2003, and later served as Undersecretary of Regional Development. Delpiano was called on to temporarily fill the position of Minister of the Interior from May 9 – May 24, when Francisco Vidal filled the post. In 2006, Delpiano was named by President Michelle Bachelet the Presidency Socio-Cultural Area Director (Directora del Área Socio Cultural de la Presidencia de la República). With this new post, she presided over the foundations and social organizations that depend on the president's cabinet.

In January 2007, Delpiano assumed the role of Intendant (governor) of the Santiago Metropolitan Region, replacing Víctor Barrueto. In this position, she was in charge of the Transantiago transportation project.
