= Clarisa Hardy =

Argentinian-born chilean politician, anthropologist and psychologist

Clarisa Rut Hardy Raskovan
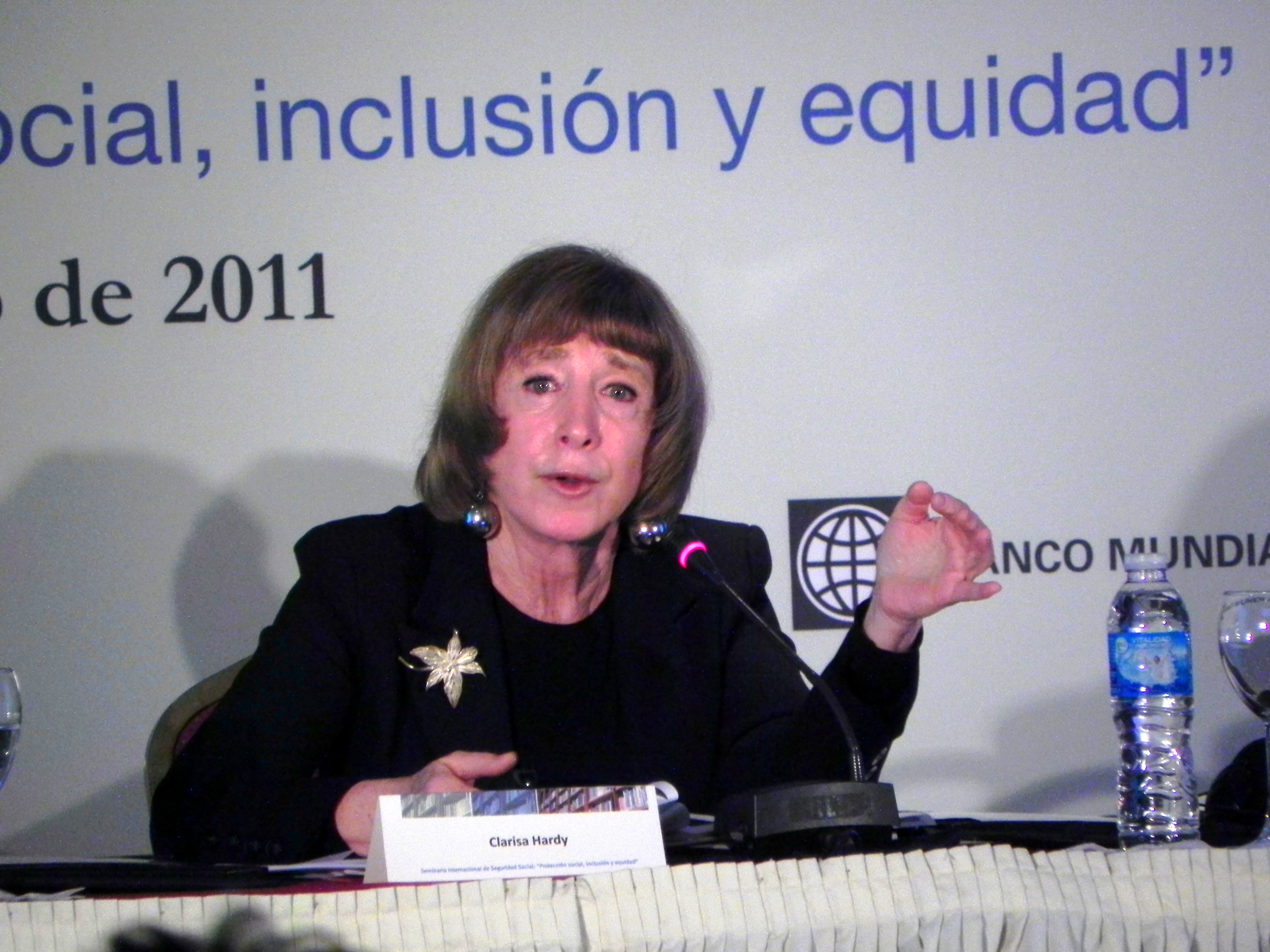
- Clarisa Hardy in 2011

Minister of Planning
- In office March 11, 2006 – January 8, 2008
- President: Michelle Bachelet
- Preceded by: Yasna Provoste
- Succeeded by: Paula Quintana

Personal details
- Born: December 15, 1945 (age 80) Buenos Aires, Argentina
- Party: Socialist Party
- Children: 2
- Education: University of Chile; Oxford University
- Occupation: Psychologist; anthropologist; writer; politician

Clarisa Rut Hardy Raskovan (born December 15, 1945, in Buenos Aires) is an Argentinian-born psychologist, anthropologist, writer and politician from Chile, Minister for Social Development and Planning during the first term of Michelle Bachelet.

== Biography ==
Born in a Jewish family that fled to South America to escape from the Nazis, arrived to Chile at the age of five. Her father was the Indian filmmaker Boris Hardy.

She studied at the Scuola Italiana of Santiago, and psychology at the University of Chile and later obtained a master's degree in social anthropology at the University of Oxford.

== Professional and public career ==
Her first job as a public servant was in 1972, when she was appointed Human Resources Manager of the state-owned Corporación de Fomento de la Producción (Corfo).

In 1974, Hardy left Chile to teach at the School of Psychology of the National Autonomous University of Mexico. Later, also in Mexico, between 1982 and 1983, she worked as a researcher for the Center for Social and Economic Studies of the Third World (Ceestem).

At the end of 1983 returned to Chile to work in social affairs. In 1990, she was appointed head of the Department of Social Affairs of the Ministry for Social Development and Planning. Later, she was appointed Executive Secretary of the Chilean government's inter-ministry Social Affairs Committee.

In 1994, she started working for Fundación Chile 21, a socialist think tank founded by the social democrat politician and later president Ricardo Lagos, responsible for the social affairs workshops. In 1996, she was appointed coordinator of the Social Affairs Department, while at the same time, working as an advisor to the Ministry of Labor and Social Affairs.

In 2000, Hardy was appointed Executive Director of Fundación Chile 21, and at the same time, she became part of the advisor committee of the National Women's Service (Sernam). She remained in the position until 2005.

In 2006, she was appointed Minister for Social Development and Planning by president Michelle Bachelet. She remained in office until 2008.

In 2014, she was named Executive Director of the progressive think tank Fundación Dialoga, after the resignation of Michelle Bachelet, who had just been elected president of Chile for a second term.

== Published works ==
- Derechos ciudadanos (co-authored with Pablo Morris), 2001
- Equidad y protección social. Desafíos de políticas sociales en América Latina, 2004
- Ideas para Chile, 2010
- Estratificación social en América Latina: retos de cohesión social, 2014
