= Alejandra Krauss =

Chilean politician

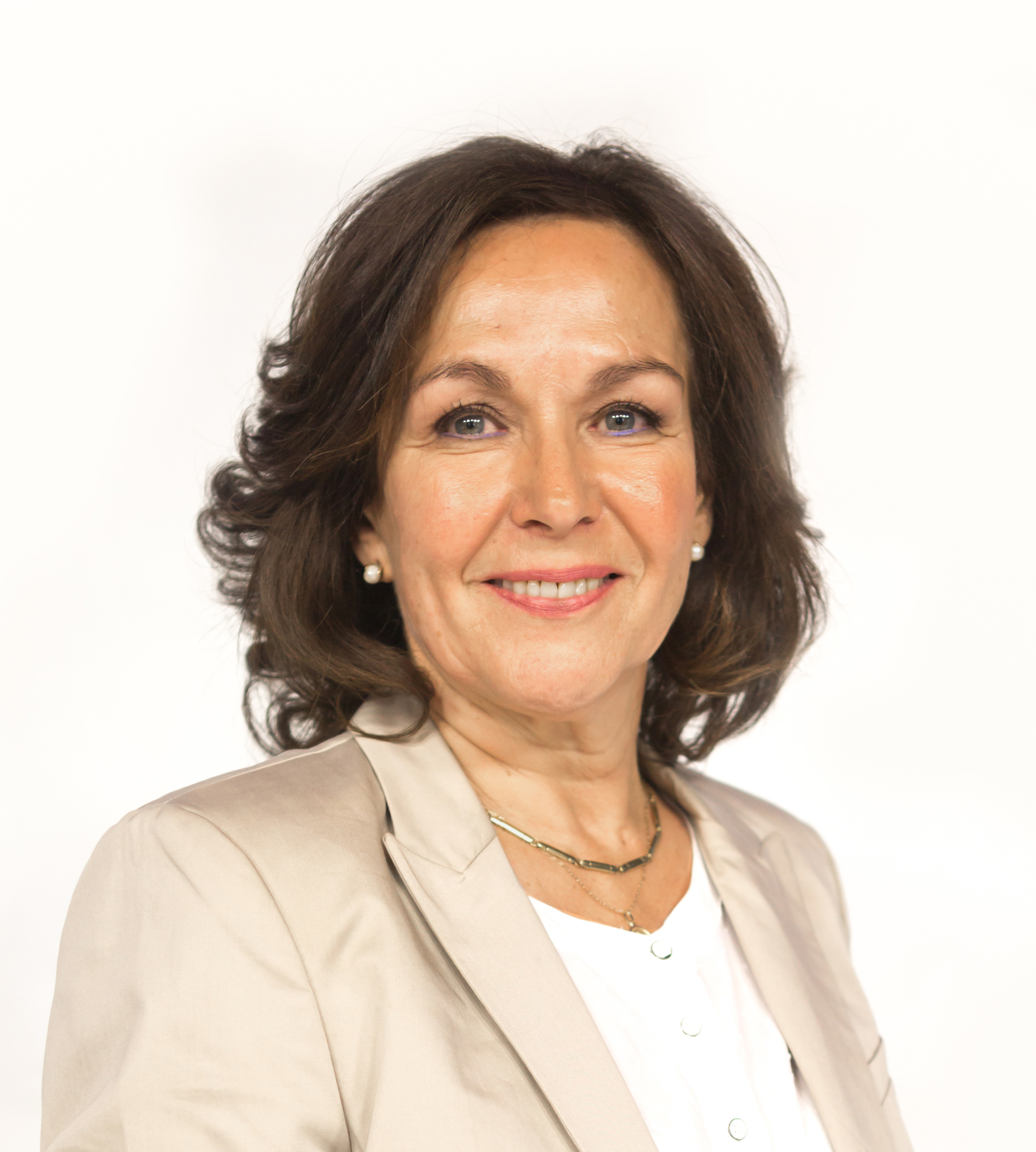

Expert Commissioner of the Constitutional Council
- In office 6 March 2023 – 7 November 2023

Minister of Labor
- In office 18 November 2016 – 11 March 2018
- President: Michelle Bachelet
- Preceded by: Ximena Rincón
- Succeeded by: Nicolás Monckeberg

Minister of Planning and Cooperation
- In office 11 March 2000 – 11 March 2002
- President: Ricardo Lagos
- Preceded by: Germán Quintana
- Succeeded by: Cecilia Pérez Díaz

Personal details
- Born: 17 June 1956 (age 70) Santiago, Chile
- Party: Christian Democratic Party
- Spouse: Andrés Donoso
- Children: 7
- Parent(s): Enrique Krauss; Gabriela Valle
- Education: University of Chile (B.Sc)
- Occupation: Politician
- Profession: Lawyer

Alejandra Krauss Valle (born 17 June 1956) is a Chilean politician and former minister.

She is the daughter of Enrique Krauss, who was the Minister of the Interior under Patricio Aylwin. She studied law at the Universidad de Chile. Krauss served as lawyer, social worker, and was the founding member of the law firm "Krauss y Donoso y Cía".

Krauss has promoted social causes in La Florida, creating "Family and Future," a social organization dedicated to family development, together with Mariana Aylwin. As a member of the Christian Democrat Party of Chile, Krauss was named Minister of Planning and Cooperation (MIDEPLAN) by President Ricardo Lagos, and she filled this post from 2000 to 2002. In 2004 Krauss stood as a candidate for town councillor for La Florida, and was elected with 10.93% of the vote.

== Early life and education ==
Krauss was born in Santiago on 29 December 1956, the daughter of Enrique Krauss, a former parliamentarian and cabinet minister, and Gabriela Valle.

She studied law at the University of Chile, graduating in 1982. After qualifying as a lawyer, she spent much of her career in private practice at the law firm KyD Abogados, founded by her father, where she specialized in civil law, labour law, commercial law, and family law. She has served on the council of the Chilean Bar Association and has taught law at the Diego Portales University, the University of Chile, and the San Sebastián University.

Krauss is a practising Catholic. In March 1981, she married lawyer Andrés Donoso Saint, son of former housing minister Andrés Donoso Larraín, who served during the administration of President Eduardo Frei Montalva. The couple have seven children: six sons and one daughter.

== Political career ==
Krauss joined the Christian Democratic Party (PDC) as a teenager, following in the footsteps of her father. She participated in the campaign for the "No" option in the 1988 plebiscite and later worked on the political campaigns of Mariana Aylwin in the 1993 parliamentary election and of her father in both internal party contests and the 1997 parliamentary election, in which he was elected deputy for Santiago.

On 11 March 2000, President Ricardo Lagos appointed her Minister of Planning and Cooperation, making her the first woman to hold the position. She served until 7 January 2002.

In the 2004 municipal elections, Krauss was elected to the municipal council of La Florida for the 2004–2008 term, receiving 10.93% of the vote. Ahead of the 2008 municipal elections, she sought the nomination of the centre-left Concertación coalition for mayor of the commune, but the coalition ultimately selected Socialist candidate Jorge Gajardo.

In addition to her elected and ministerial roles, Krauss served as legal counsel to the Integra Foundation, advised state-owned entities including the National Petroleum Company (ENAP) and BancoEstado, as well as the Undersecretariat of Social Security, and was a member of the board of the Metropolitan Judicial Assistance Corporation.

In November 2016, she was appointed chair of the board of the Iquique Free Trade Zone (ZOFRI). She held the position only briefly, however, as on 18 November President Michelle Bachelet appointed her Minister of Labour and Social Welfare, succeeding Ximena Rincón. She remained in office until the end of Bachelet's administration on 11 March 2018.

On 25 January 2023, the Senate appointed Krauss as one of the members of the Expert Commission, the body tasked with drafting a preliminary constitutional text for consideration by the Constitutional Council as part of the ongoing constitutional process.
