= Antonia Orellana =

Chilean politician

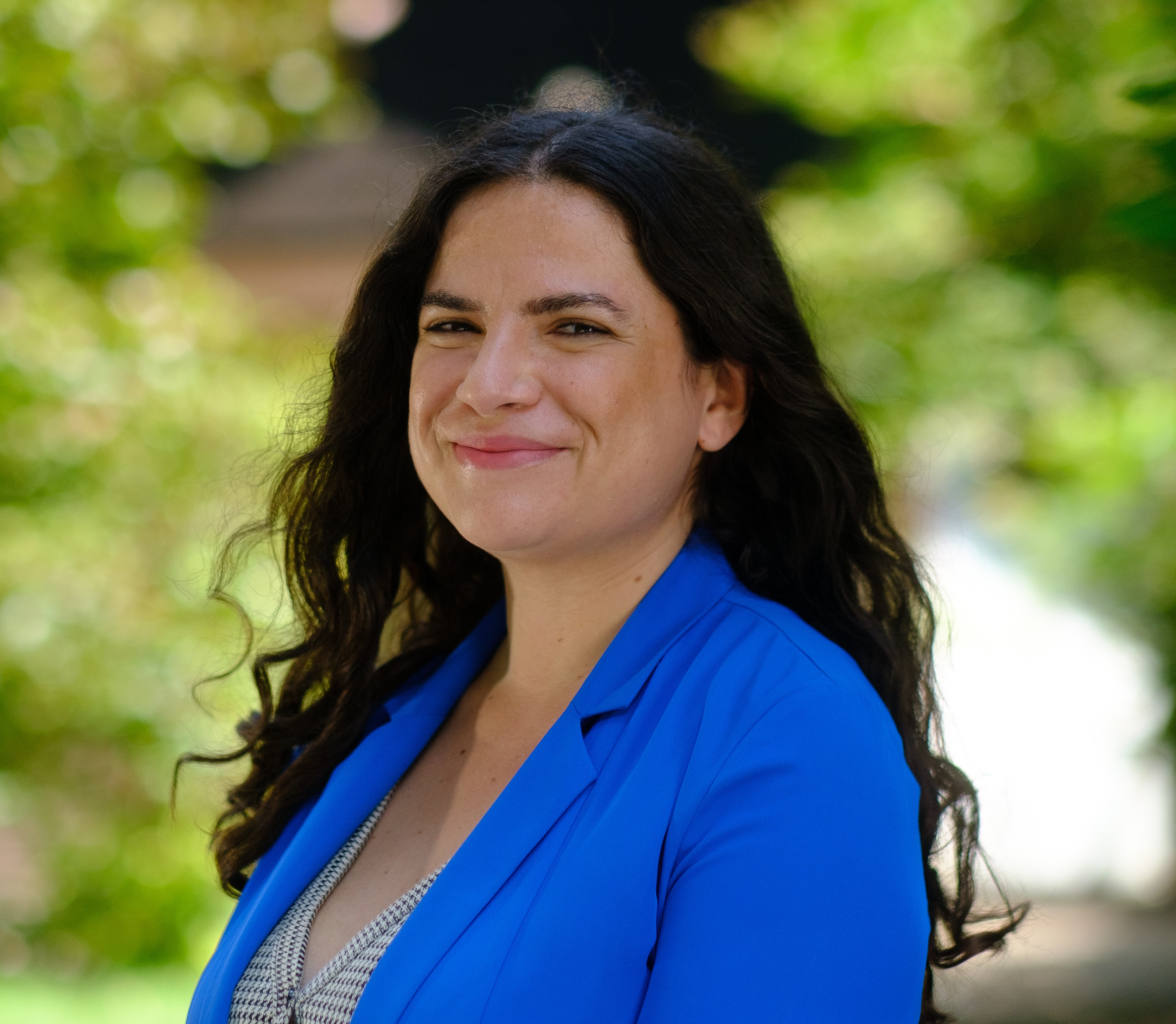
- Orellana in 2022

Minister of Women and Gender Equality
- In office 11 March 2022 – 11 March 2026
- President: Gabriel Boric
- Preceded by: Mónica Zalaquett
- Succeeded by: Judith Marín

Personal details
- Born: 21 December 1989 (age 36) Santiago, Chile
- Party: Social Convergence (2019–present)
- Other political affiliations: Libertarian Left (2015–2017); Socialism and Liberty (SOL) (2017–2019)
- Relatives: Juan Cristóbal Guarello (uncle)
- Education: University of Chile (BA)
- Occupation: Politician
- Profession: Journalist

Antonia Cósmica Orellana Guarello (born 21 December 1989) is a Chilean politician, journalist and Minister of Women and Gender Equality.

== Early life ==
Antonia Orellana, also known as "Toti" and "Candy" to friends, was born in Macul in 1989 to mother Margarita Guarello, an academic, and father Alfredo Orellana, a poet. Her father died when she was 5 years old, and she lived in La Florida with her brother and 3 sisters.

== Education ==
Orellana was a student of Journalism at the University of Chile where she completed her Bachelors and Master's degree in Gender studies.

== Career ==
Antonia Orellana is a well-recognized Journalist and activist. She worked for several media outlets in Chile, including Radio Cooperativa, La Tercera, and El Desconcierto. She also worked as a correspondent for BBC and Al Jazeera. Being a feminist activist, she has been involved in several movements including Ni una menos movement, and National Coordinator of the Feminist and Sexual Diversity Organization. She was a member of Communist party of Chile and served as a counselor for the Municipality of San Bernardo. She was a candidate for the 10th district but did not win the seat. She is one of Chilean President Gabriel Boric’s, main trusted advisors.

== Honors and awards ==
She was awarded the Raquel Correa Award and the Adriana Cousino award for her work in Journalism and Feminist Activism.
