= Paula Quintana =

Chilean sociologist and politician (1956–2023)

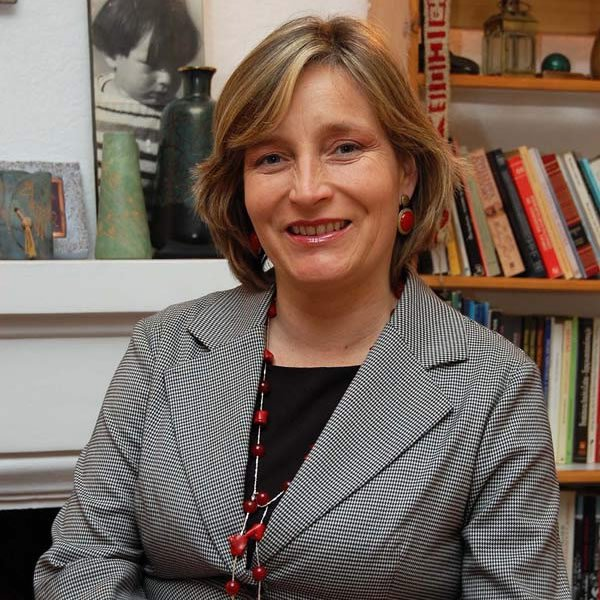

Councilor of Valparaíso
- In office 6 December 2012 – 6 December 2016

Minister of Planning
- In office 8 January 200 – 11 March 2010
- President: Michelle Bachelet
- Preceded by: Clarisa Hardy
- Succeeded by: Felipe Kast

Regional Ministerial Secretary of National Assets for Valparaíso Region
- In office 6 October 2003 – 2006
- President: Ricardo Lagos
- Preceded by: Edmundo Bustos Azócar

Regional Ministerial Secretary of Planning and Cooperation for Valparaíso Region
- President: Ricardo Lagos

Personal details
- Born: Paula Ximena Quintana Meléndez; 26 June 1956 Valparaíso, Chile
- Died: 6 January 2023 (aged 66)
- Party: Socialist
- Education: University of Chile
- Occupation: Sociologist, academic, politician

Paula Ximena Quintana Meléndez (26 June 1956 – 6 January 2023) was a Chilean sociologist, academic, and politician. From 2012 to 2016 she served as a councilor for Valparaíso commune. From 2008 to 2010 she was Minister of Planning in the first government of President Michelle Bachelet.

== Professional career ==
Paula Quintana was born in Valparaíso on 26 June 1956. She studied sociology at the University of Chile in Santiago, and later earned a master's degree in management and public policy at the same university.

In the private arena, she was director of the consulting firm Análisis, Planificación y Desarrollo, and worked as a research professional at the Casa de la Mujer of Valparaíso and the project Joven Valparaíso y Viña del Mar.

Quintana was a professor of sociology in Valparaíso, and director of the Public Interest Affairs Program at the University of Valparaíso.

== Political career ==
Quintana was a member of the Socialist Party of Chile (PS). She served as deputy director of the National Council of Culture and the Arts, regional ministerial secretary (Seremi) of National Assets, and head of the Department of Regional Development of the Regional Government of Valparaíso.

Quintana was appointed Minister of Planning of the first government of Michelle Bachelet on 8 January 2008, retiring with the end of the administration on 11 March 2010.

In early 2012, she was defeated in a primary election to choose the Concertación's candidate for mayor of Valparaíso in that year's municipal election. She was later elected councilor for the commune for the term 2012–2016.

In 2016, she announced that she would not seek another term as councilor, and in October of that year, she resigned her membership in the PS, and decided to support Movimiento Autonomista candidate Jorge Sharp for mayor of Valparaíso, who was eventually elected.

The University of Valparaíso announced that Quintana died on 6 January 2023, at the age of 66.
