= Judith Marín =

Chilean politician

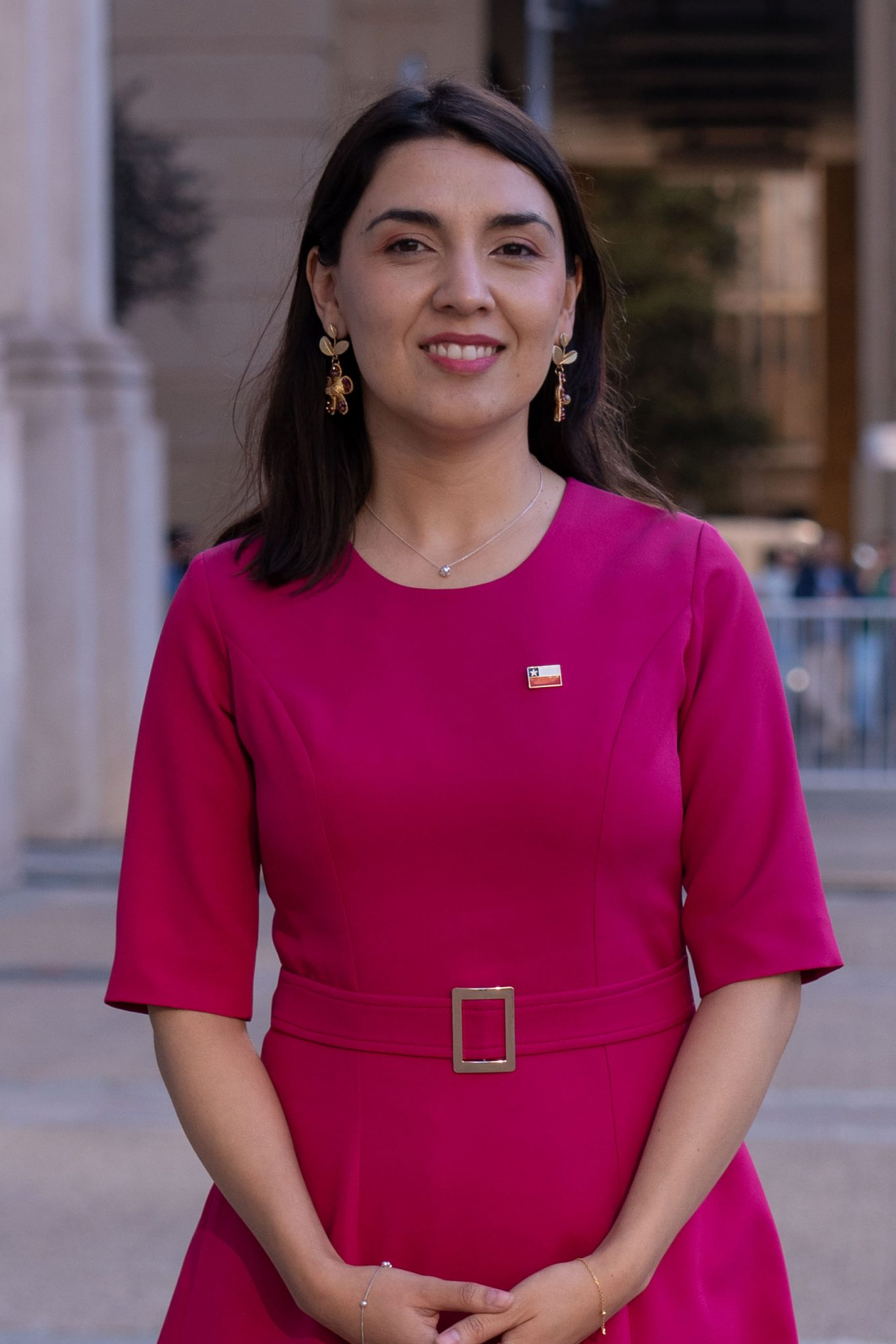

Minister of Women and Gender Equity
- Incumbent
- Assumed office 11 March 2026
- President: José Antonio Kast
- Preceded by: Antonia Orellana

General Secretary of the Christian Social Party
- Incumbent
- Assumed office 23 September 2022
- President: Sara Concha
- Preceded by: Position established

Member of San Ramón City Council
- In office 28 June 2021 – 6 December 2024

Personal details
- Born: Judith Makarena Marín Morales; December 24, 1995 (age 30) Santiago, Chile
- Party: PSC (since 2022)
- Other political affiliations: RN (2021–2022)
- Education: University of Santiago, Chile
- Occupation: Teacher • Politician

Judith Makarena Marín Morales (born 24 December 1995) is a Chilean teacher and politician. She is a member and secretary-general of the Christian Social Party (PSC) and served as a municipal councillor of San Ramón from 2021 to 2024. In January 2026, she was nominated as Minister of Women and Gender Equity in the government of President José Antonio Kast.

== Biography ==
Marín comes from an evangelical family from the La Bandera neighborhood in the Santiago Metropolitan Region. She completed her primary education at Escuela Ciudad de Lyon in El Bosque and her secondary education at an evangelical Christian school.

She pursued higher education in Spanish Language and Philosophy Teaching at the University of Santiago, Chile, where she was part of the leadership of the university's evangelical student group.

=== Social activism ===
She has been publicly active as a social activist linked to social conservatism, particularly in moral and bioethical debates. She has identified as a pro-life activist and has opposed the legalization of abortion in Chile.

In July 2017, she was removed from the National Congress of Chile by the Carabineros de Chile after failing to comply with an eviction order during a session debating the decriminalization of abortion under three circumstances.

=== Political career ===
She began her political career as a parliamentary adviser to congressman Eduardo Durán. She later joined National Renewal, through which she was elected municipal councillor of San Ramón in the 2021 Chilean municipal elections, as part of the Chile Vamos coalition. She ran for re-election in the 2024 Chilean municipal elections but was not re-elected.

After resigning from National Renewal, she participated in the founding of the Christian Social Party. In the 2025 Chilean parliamentary election, she ran as a candidate for the 12th electoral district of Chile but was not elected.

=== Cabinet appointment ===
In January 2026, she was nominated as Minister of Women and Gender Equity, becoming the only member of the Social Christian Party to join the presidential cabinet. Since her nomination, she has stated that her priorities include strengthening the family, preventing domestic violence, and promoting public policies supporting motherhood.

=== Controversies and public reception ===
Her appointment drew criticism from opposition sectors and feminist organizations, which expressed concern over potential breaches of the principle of state secularism and her positions on sexual and reproductive rights.

Some political figures described her as a "religious fanatic" or linked her to alleged exorcism practices, claims that were denied by her political party.

=== Personal life ===
She practices the evangelical faith, which she has acknowledged as influential in her personal and public life.

== Electoral history ==
Year	Election	Constituency	Coalition	Party	Votes	%	Result
2021	Municipal (Councillor)	San Ramón	Chile Vamos	RN	868	2.58	Elected
2024	Municipal (Councillor)	San Ramón	Christian Social Party	PSC	1,841	3.83	Not elected
2025	Parliamentary (Deputy)	12th district	Cambio por Chile	PSC	15,524	2.51	Not elected
