= Pablo Zalaquett =

Chilean politician (born 1963)

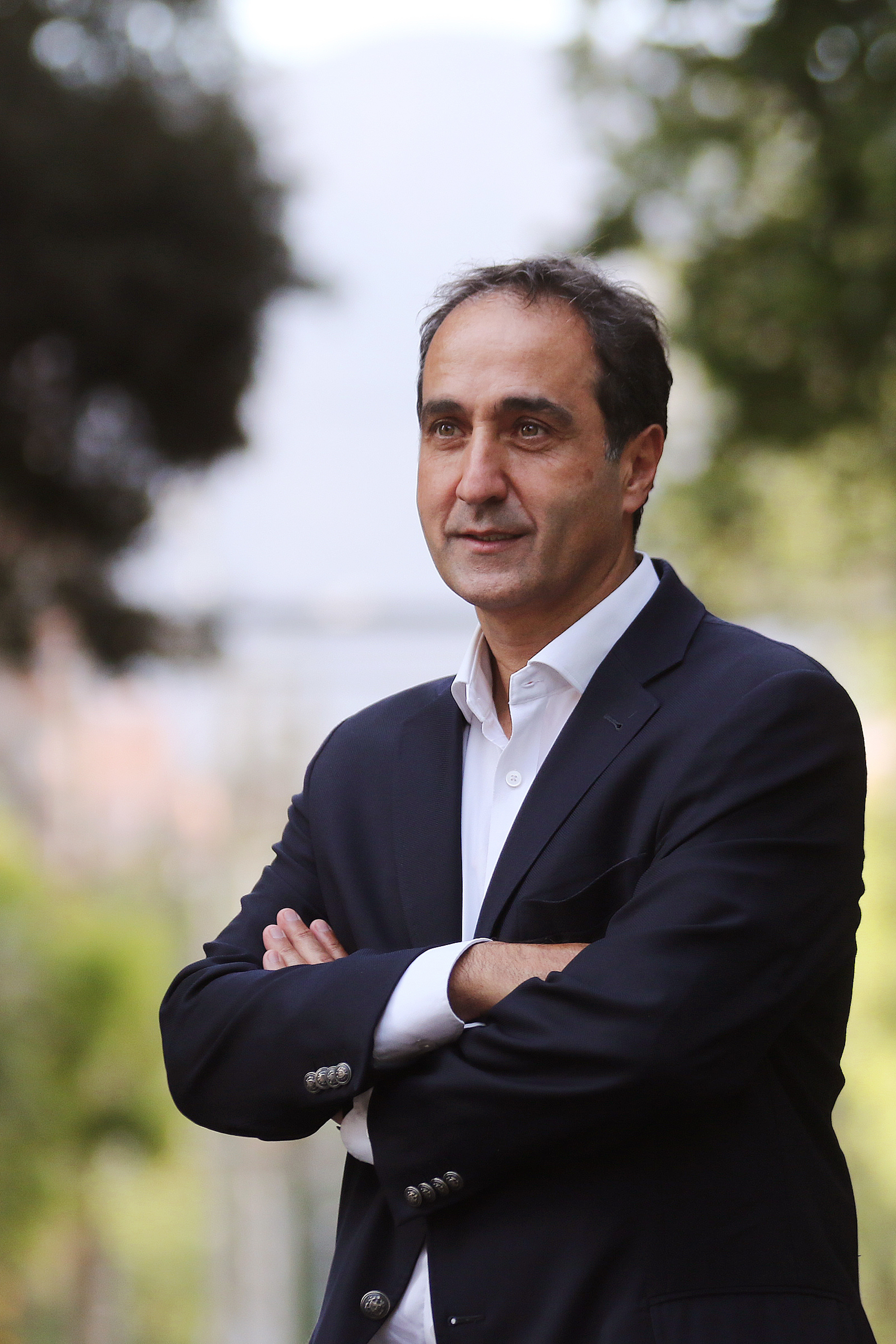

Mayor of Santiago Centro
- In office 6 December 2008 – 6 December 2012
- Preceded by: Raúl Alcaíno
- Succeeded by: Carolina Tohá

Mayor of La Florida
- In office 6 December 2000 – 6 December 2008
- Preceded by: Gonzalo Duarte
- Succeeded by: Jorge Gajardo

Personal details
- Born: 9 July 1963 (age 63) Santiago, Chile
- Party: Independent Democratic Union (UDI)
- Spouse: Sylvia Bustamante
- Children: Four
- Relatives: Mónica Zalaquett (sister)
- Education: Pontifical Catholic University of Chile; University of Navarra (MA)
- Occupation: Politician
- Profession: Economist

Pablo Antonio Zalaquett Said (born 9 July 1963) is a Chilean business administrator, lobbyist, and former mayor of the communes of Santiago and La Florida and member of the Independent Democratic Union.

Eisenhower Fellowships selected Pablo Zalaquett in 1999 to represent Chile.

== Political career ==
=== Mayor of La Florida ===
In 2000, Joaquín Lavín and Pablo Longueira from the UDI asked him to run for mayor of La Florida in the municipal elections of that year, despite having no previous political career. Zalaquett accepted, and in the elections he managed to take the mayoralty from Gonzalo Duarte of the PDC, who had led the commune since 1990.

Initially known as a "media-friendly mayor" due to his appearances on television programs and public events, after the 2004 municipal elections —where he was narrowly re-elected against Germán Correa of the PS— he decided to step away from television. Always aligned with the UDI and its leader Joaquín Lavín, his detractors criticized him as demagogic and populist, while others praised his progress in developing the commune.

=== Mayor of Santiago ===
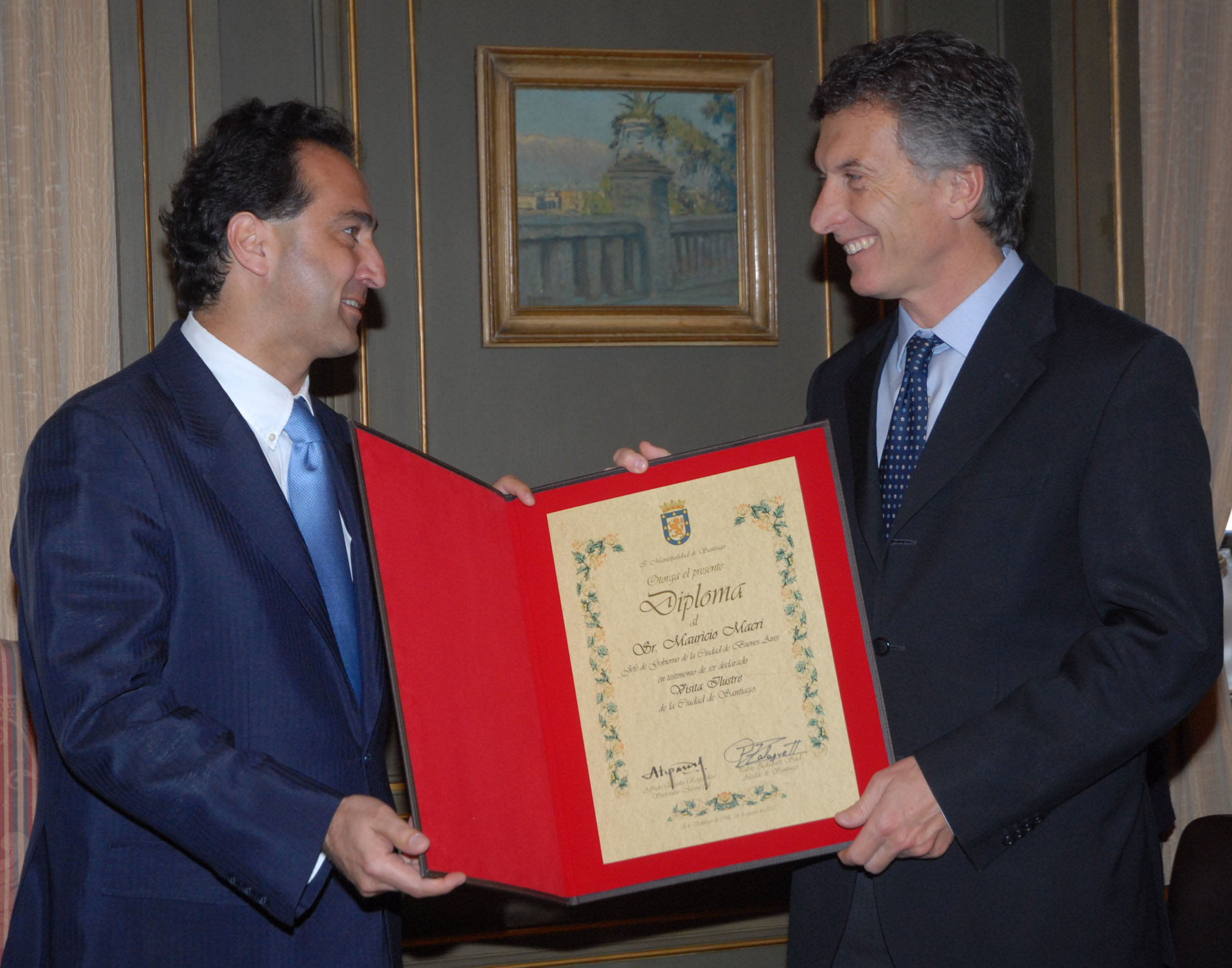
Zalaquett with Mauricio Macri in 2010.

In July 2008, for the municipal elections of that same year, he decided not to seek re-election in La Florida and instead launched his candidacy for the Santiago municipality, where he defeated former mayor Jaime Ravinet by obtaining 47.33% of the vote. He assumed office on 6 December of that year.

As mayor of Santiago, he frequently faced demonstrations held in the historic center of the capital, being openly opposed to them due to the violence in which some ended. During the 2011 student mobilizations, Zalaquett expressed criticism of the student occupations of schools under his administration and requested their eviction several times, also calling for the prohibition of marches organized by high school and university students. In August 2011, he announced that if the student movement continued until 11 September (the anniversary of the 1973 Chilean coup d'état) and there was insufficient police control, the Chilean Armed Forces should be called upon to control the demonstrations. His statements sparked strong criticism, with a group of students openly demanding his resignation.

He ran again for the mayoralty of Santiago in the 2012 elections, but failed to be re-elected, being defeated by former deputy Carolina Tohá of the PPD. This defeat marked the loss of the municipality for the center-right after three consecutive victories.

In 2011, he presented the keys to the city of Santiago to then President of the United States Barack Obama.

=== Senate candidacy and retirement from politics ===
He later participated in the 2013 parliamentary elections, running for senator for the Santiago Poniente constituency. However, Zalaquett obtained only 17.9% of the votes, so the Alliance’s seat was taken by Andrés Allamand of RN, who received 20.2% of the votes. It was the first time that the senatorial seat for that constituency was won by a candidate from RN.

After two consecutive electoral defeats, he announced his retirement from politics. In 2020, he attempted to run for mayor of the commune of Vitacura; however, he did not win the primary, finishing third behind the Evópoli and RN candidates.
