= Mónica Zalaquett =

Chilean businesswoman and politician

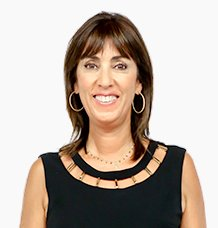

Minister of Women and Gender Equality
- In office 9 June 2020 – 11 March 2022
- President: Sebastián Piñera
- Preceded by: Macarena Santelices
- Succeeded by: Antonia Orellana

Member of the Chamber of Deputies
- In office 11 March 2010 – 11 March 2014
- Preceded by: Roberto Sepúlveda
- Succeeded by: Joaquín Lavín León
- Constituency: 20th District

Personal details
- Born: 4 May 1962 (age 64) Santiago, Chile
- Party: Unión Demócrata Independiente (UDI)
- Relatives: Pablo Zalaquett (brother)
- Education: Bolivian Catholic University San Pablo (BA); Universidad de Los Andes (PgD); University for Development (PgD); American University (PgD)
- Profession: Journalist

Mónica Beatriz Zalaquett Said (born 4 May 1962) is a Chilean business and political communicator. From 2010 to 2014, she was a deputy of the 20th District by the Independent Democratic Union (UDI).

Between 2020 and 2022, she served as Minister of Women and Gender Equity under the second government of Sebastián Piñera, replacing Macarena Santelices.

In the early 1980s, she moved to Bolivia, where in 1986 she founded the silver jewelry company Rafaella Pitti, which exports its products internationally. She also hosted family-oriented television programs on ATB-Red Nacional. Between 1984 and 1985, she served as commercial manager of the Sheraton Hotel, and between 1985 and 1986 as commercial manager of LAN Chile.

In 2003, she settled permanently in Chile. Two years later, she became host of the radio program Nosotras en Agricultura on Radio Agricultura, a position she held until June 2009.

== Biography ==
She is the daughter of the Chilean with Lebanese descent Antonio Zalaquett and the Peruvian of Palestinian descent Beatriz Said. Her brother is the former mayor of Santiago, Pablo Zalaquett. She is married to Bolivian businessman Dieter Garafulic and is the mother of four children: Nicole, Diego, Tomás and Matías.

She has degrees in journalism studies from the Bolivian Catholic University and political science from Universidad de Los Andes and Universidad del Desarrollo. She also has a Diploma in Management for Political Campaign from the American University of the United States.

== Political career ==
She has been a member of the Independent Democratic Union (UDI) since 2000. That same year, she worked on the campaign of Pablo Zalaquett, who was elected mayor of La Florida. In 2005, she joined the campaign team of Pablo Longueira, who was elected senator for the Santiago East constituency in the Santiago Metropolitan Region.

She was a candidate for deputy in the 2009 Chilean parliamentary election for District No. 20, which then comprised the communes of Cerrillos, Estación Central and Maipú, in the Santiago Metropolitan Region. She was elected with 20.99% of the vote and assumed office on 11 March 2010.

During her tenure as a deputy, she chaired the Chamber’s Tourism Commission in 2012 and 2013. In that role, she worked with various private-sector tourism organizations and participated in commission sessions held in different regions of the country. She supported the approval of a labor adaptability bill for the tourism sector.
