= Isabel Plá =

Chilean politician (born 1964)

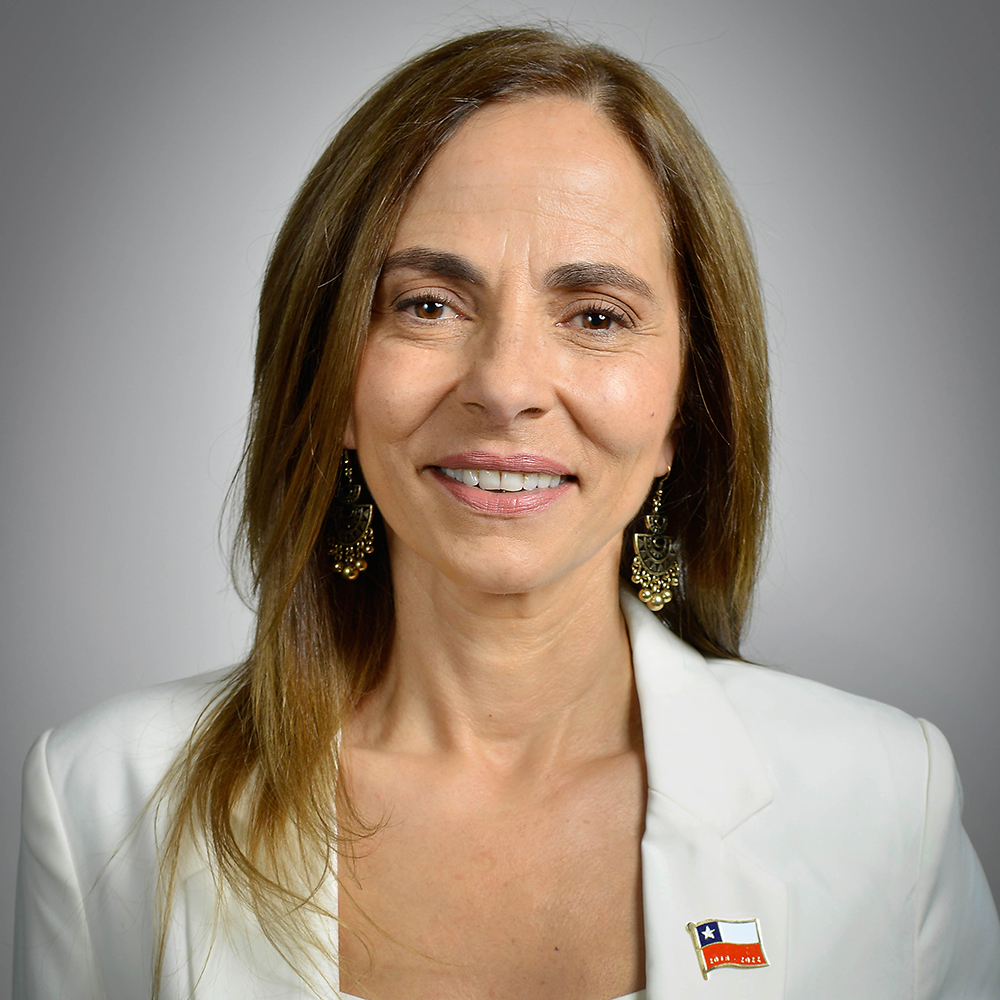
- Official portrait (2018)

Minister of Woman
- In office 11 March 2018 – 13 March 2020
- Preceded by: Claudia Pascual
- Succeeded by: Carolina Cuevas Merino

Counsilwoman of Peñalolén
- In office 6 December 2004 – 6 December 2008

Personal details
- Born: 31 January 1964 (age 62) Santiago, Chile
- Party: Unión Demócrata Independiente
- Spouse: Luis Felipe Olivares Quirós
- Parent(s): Ramón Plá; Joan Jarufe
- Education: Diego Portales University (BA); Alberto Hurtado University (MA)
- Occupation: Politician
- Profession: Public relations

Isabel Cecilia Plá Jarufe (born 31 January 1964) is a Chilean politician who served as minister of State and councilwoman in his country.

== Biography ==
She was born on 31 January 1964 in Quillota, the eldest daughter of Ramón Plá, a Spanish immigrant to Chile, and Joan Jarufe, of Arab descent. Together with her three siblings (Montserrat, Ramón and Karim), she was raised in Concepción after her family moved there and opened a bakery.

=== Education and professional career ===
She completed her primary education at Colegio Inmaculada Concepción. After finishing secondary school, she moved to Santiago and in 1983 enrolled in law at the Gabriela Mistral University, but left after two years for financial reasons. She then relocated to Viña del Mar to work in her cousins’ wool warehouse.

In 1987, she resumed higher education, enrolling in public relations at the IPEVE Professional Institute (now Diego Portales University), where she completed her coursework and presented her graduation project, although she did not formally obtain the degree, opting instead to work at the architectural firm of Emilio Arancibia, which at the time was organizing the 1991 Architecture Biennial. She later completed a diploma in Political Communication at the Alberto Hurtado University. Between 2014 and 2017, she served as coordinator of the Political and Current Affairs Unit at Fundación Avanza Chile.

She has been a panelist on Radio Cooperativa and Radio La Clave, and a weekly columnist for El Líbero since October 2014. She also participated as a panelist on the program Estado Nacional on Televisión Nacional de Chile between March and December 2011.

== Political career ==
Her political career began in 1992, when she served as chief of staff to deputy María Angélica Cristi. In 2004, she was elected councilor of Peñalolén, serving a four-year term. After completing her mandate as councilor, she became Vice President of the Independent Democratic Union (UDI).

From 2010 to 2014, she served as coordinator of the Political Analysis Unit at the Ministry General Secretariat of the Presidency.

On 23 January 2018, she was appointed by President Sebastián Piñera as Minister of Women and Gender Equality, assuming office on 11 March of that year. She resigned from the position on 13 March 2020.
