= Claudia Pascual =

Chilean politician and social anthropologist

Claudia Pacual
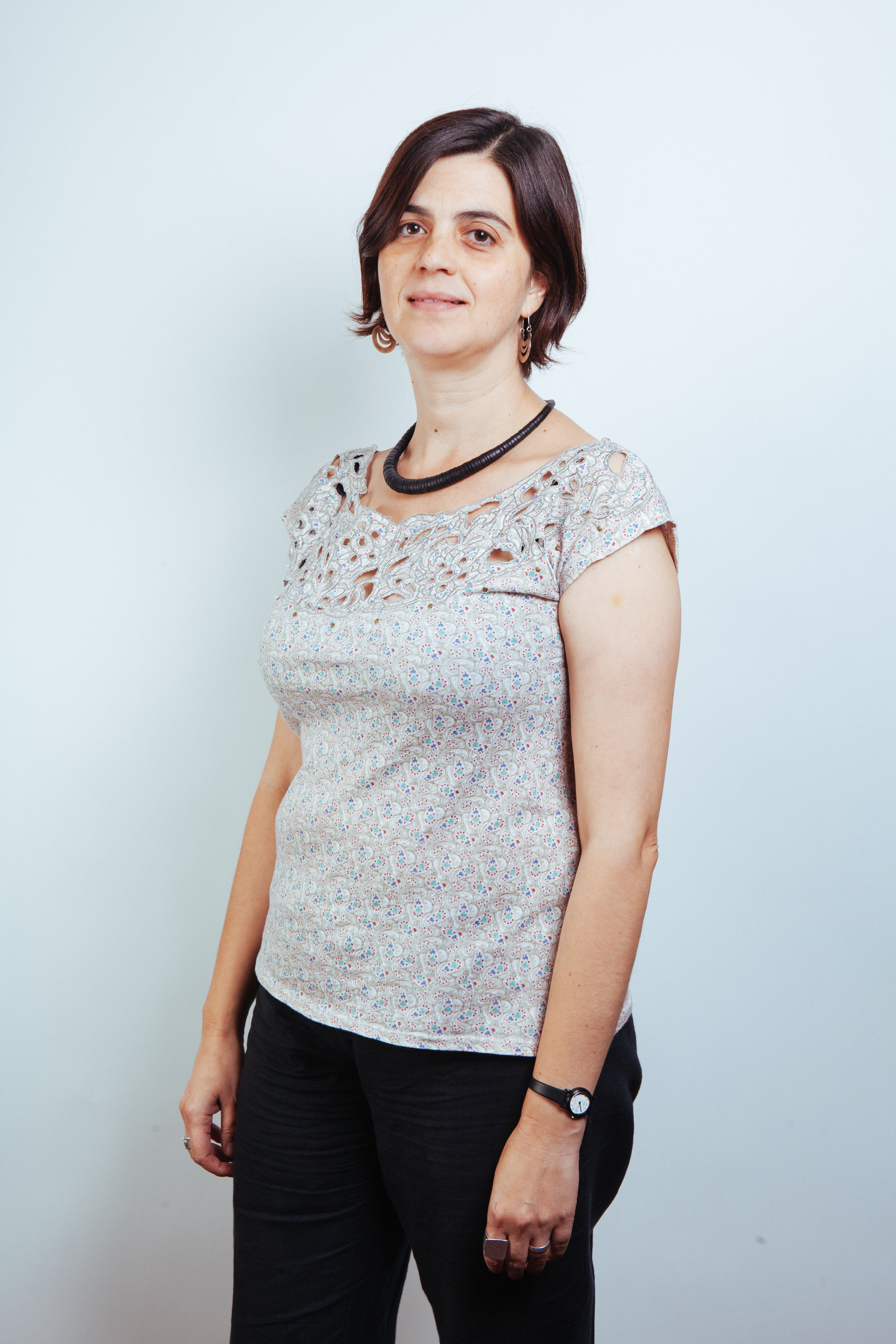
- Official portrait (2014)

Member of the Senate
- Incumbent
- Assumed office 11 March 2022
- Constituency: 7th Circunscription

Minister of Woman
- In office 3 June 2016 – 11 March 2018
- Preceded by: Creation of the position
- Succeeded by: Isabel Plá

Personal details
- Born: 14 December 1972 (age 53) Santiago, Chile
- Party: Communist Party
- Education: University of Chile (BA)
- Occupation: Politician
- Profession: Anthropologist

Claudia Pascual Grau (born December 14, 1972, in Santiago) is a social anthropologist and politician from Chile, a member of the Communist Party.

She started on March 11, 2014, as Minister Director of the National Service for Women, being the first communist in 41 years to be in the ministerial cabinet of her country. On June 3, 2016, she was officially appointed as Minister of Women and Gender Equality, portfolio created in March 2015, and which became operational in June 2016.

== Biography ==
Pascual studied social anthropology at the University of Chile. She has been a teacher in various educational institutions in her country, including universities, trade union schools and women's schools. She was coordinator of the Program for the Prevention of Drug and Alcohol Consumption of the Student Welfare Office of the University of Chile.

Pascual is a member of the Communist Party of Chile (CPC), where she has been a regional secretary, a member of the Central Committee, and a national commissioner of Women. In 2001 and 2005 she was a candidate for deputy for Santiago in representation of the CCP, not being elected on both occasions. Between 2002 and 2005 she was executive secretary of the Alejandro Lipschutz Science Institute (ICAL).

In the municipal elections of 2008 she was elected councilor for the commune of Santiago. In the 2012 elections she was re-elected with the first communal majority. She resigned from office on March 5, 2014. On January 24, 2014, she was announced as the Minister Director of the National Service for Women by President-elect Michelle Bachelet. She took office on March 11, 2014, with the start of the new government, and thus became the first communist member to join a cabinet since 1973, during the presidency of Salvador Allende.

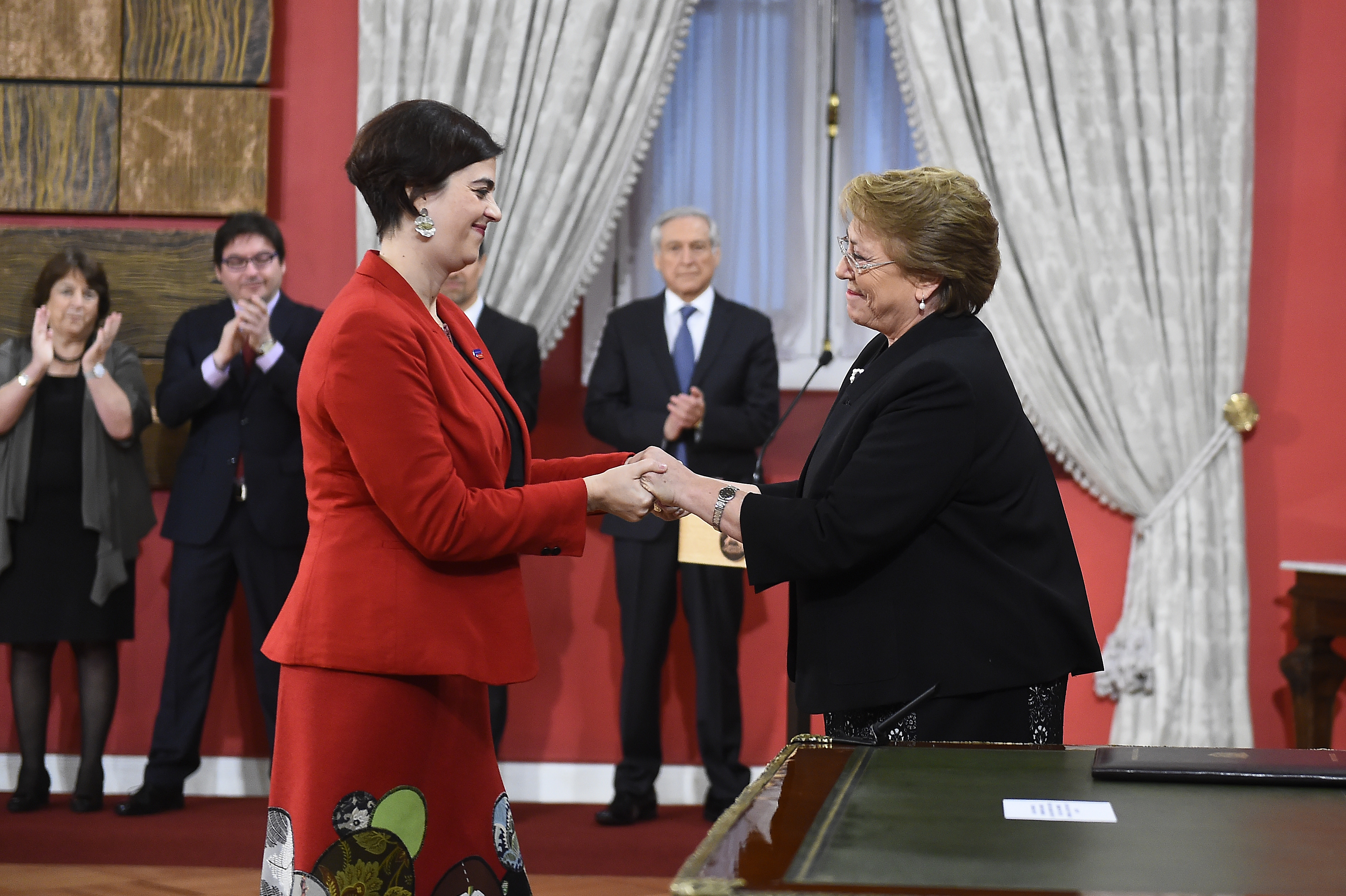
Claudia Pascual being appointed Minister of Women and Gender Equality, by President Michelle Bachelet, on 3 June 2016

On June 3, 2016, Pascual was appointed by President Michelle Bachelet as the first Minister of Women and Gender Equality, ministerial portfolio created by law 20820, of March 20, 2015, and which became operational on June 1, 2016.
