= Ministry of Labor and Social Welfare (Chile) =

Government ministry of Chile

- Ministerio del Trabajo y Previsión Social
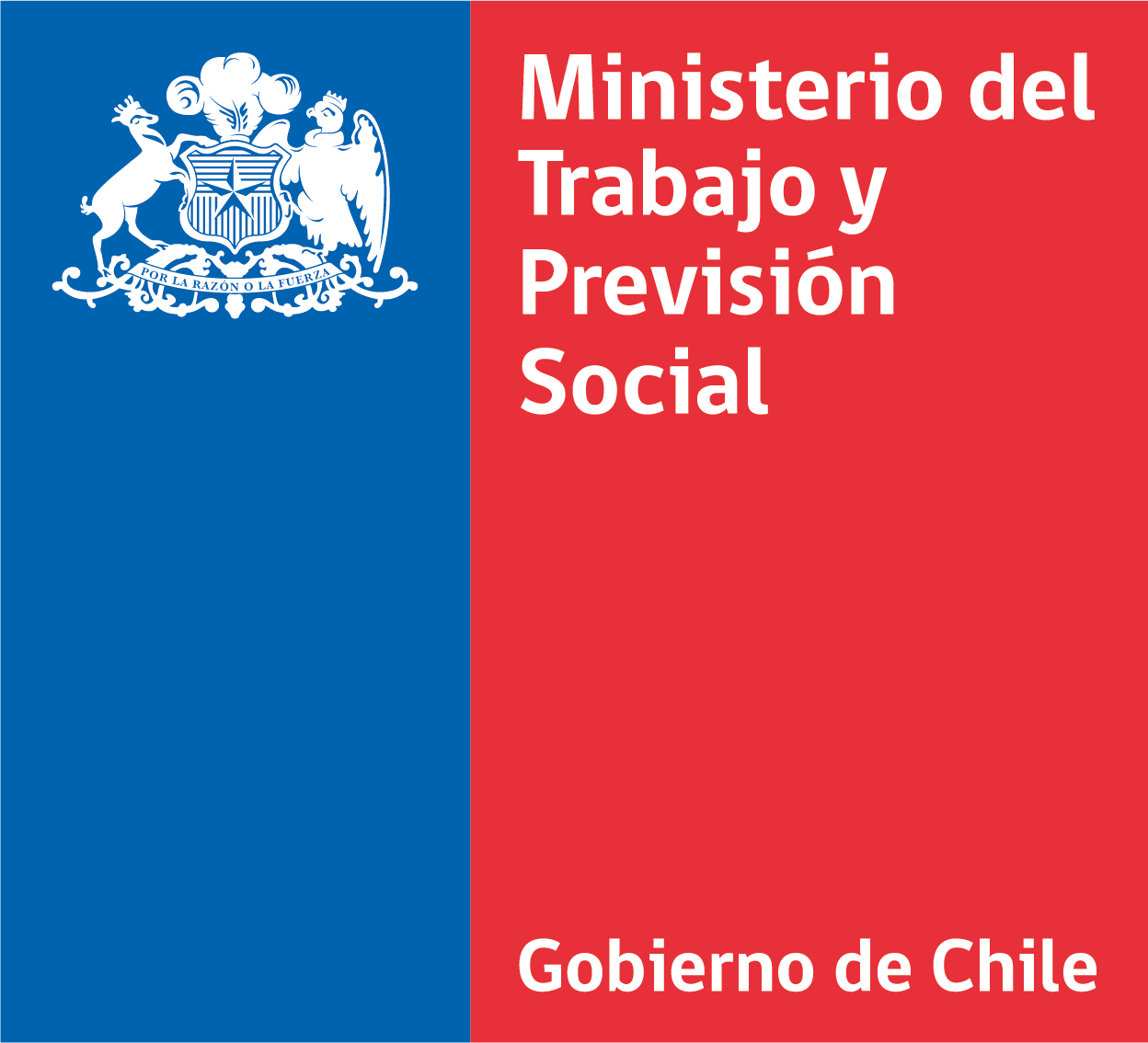

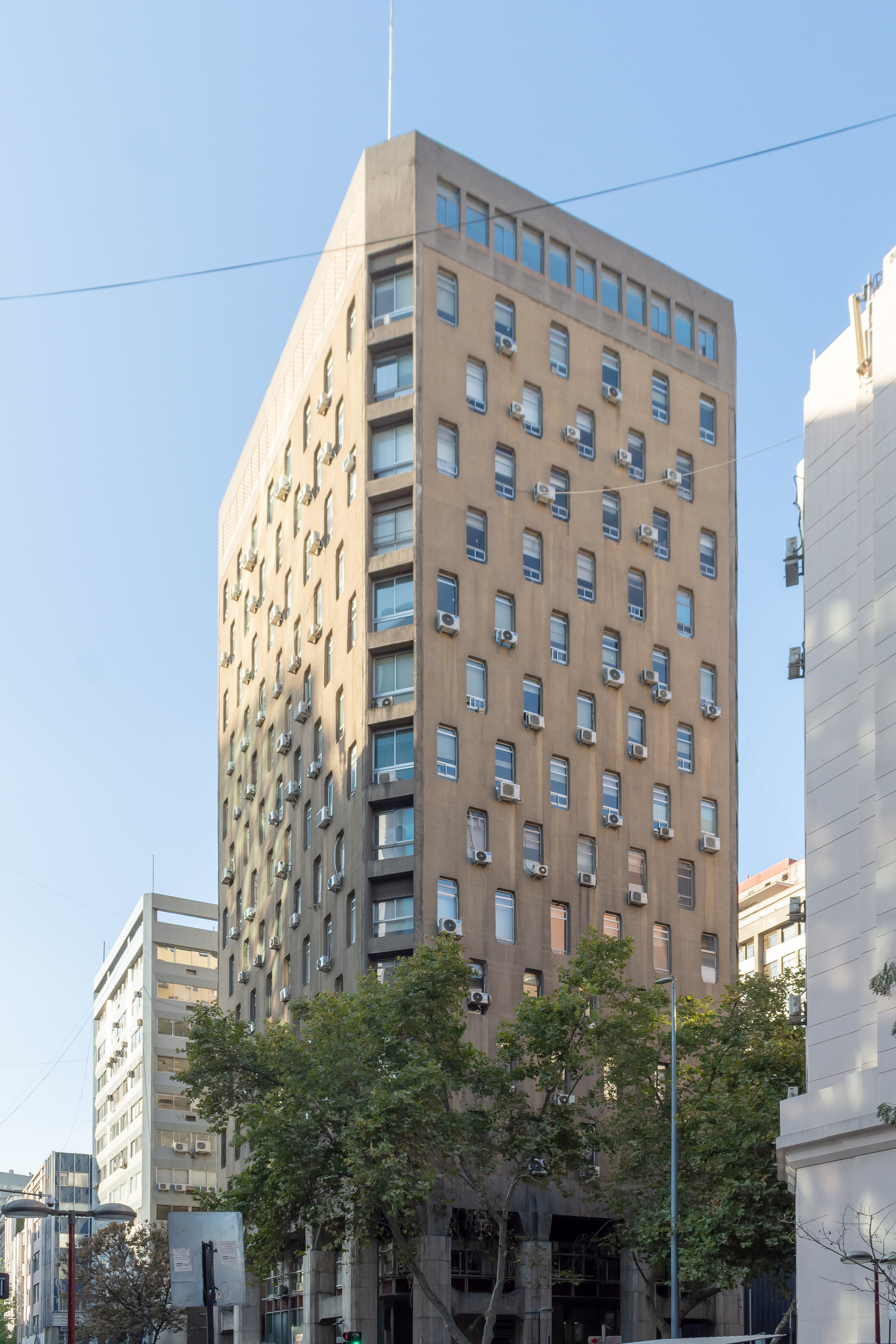
- Building of the Ministry of Labor and Social Welfare, Santiago, Metropolitan Region, Chile

Agency overview
- Formed: 5 June 1932 (as Ministry of Labor); 14 October 1959 (as the Ministry of Labor and Social Welfare)
- Preceding agencies: Ministry of Hygiene, Assistance and Social Welfare (1924–1927); Ministry of National Welfare (1927–1931)
- Jurisdiction: Government of Chile
- Headquarters: Huérfanos 1273, Santiago
- Employees: 8,419 (2025)
- Annual budget: 15,293,668,661 CLP (2026)
- Agency executives: Tomás Rau Binder, Minister of Labor and Social Welfare; Gustavo Rosende Salazar, Undersecretary of Labor; María Elisa Cabezón Otero, Undersecretary of Social Welfare; Sergio Santibáñez Catalán (s), Director of Labor
- Child agencies: Undersecretary of Labor (Subsecretaría del Trabajo, SUBTRAB); Undersecretary of Social Welfare (Subsecretaría de Previsión Social, Subprev); General Directorate of Pawn Credit (Dirección General del Crédito Prendario, DICREP); Labor Directorate (Dirección del Trabajo, DT); ChileValora; Social Security Institute (Instituto de Previsión Social, IPS); Labor Safety Institute (Instituto de Seguridad Laboral, ISL); National Training and Employment Service (Servicio Nacional de Capacitación y Empleo, Sence); Superintendency of Pensions ( Superintendencia de Pensiones, SP); Superintendency of Social Security (Superintendencia de Seguridad Social, SUSESO) (indirect)
- Website: mintrab.gob.cl (in Spanish)

The Ministry of Labor and Social Welfare (Spanish: Ministerio del Trabajo y Previsión Social) is a government ministry in Chile. It was established during the government of President Jorge Alessandri through Decree with the Force of Law No. 25, published in the Official Gazette on 29 October 1959, along with the Ministry of Public Health (MINSAL).

Since 11 March 2026, the Minister of Labor and Social Welfare is Tomás Rau. The Undersecretary of Labor is Gustavo Rosende, and the Undersecretary of Social Welfare is María Cabezón.

== Mission and objectives ==
Responsible for directing and coordinating the labor policies that govern the country, its main mission is to “identify the labor needs and problems of society so that, based on these, public efforts can be directed toward achieving a system of labor relations that prioritizes cooperation among all the actors involved.” Likewise, the Ministry must “allocate the resources necessary to carry out the policies, plans, programs, and regulations that will enable it to achieve its objectives, and oversee that the relevant legal regulations are respected and complied with.”

Its main priorities are the “promotion of public policies aimed at creating quality employment, with a strong focus on inclusion, social welfare and social security, which guarantee workers’ rights and contribute to the country’s growth.”

== Operations ==
=== Participatory Public Accountability Report ===
The Participatory Public Accountability Report (CPP) is the mechanism through which the Ministry, its subordinate undersecretariats, and related agencies annually report to the public on the management of their policies, plans, programs, actions, and budget execution, in accordance with Article 72 of Law No. 18,575.

The Minister of Labor and Social Security conducts a public accountability process between March and April each year, in a decentralized manner with direct citizen participation. The objectives of this mechanism are:

- Inform citizens about the performance of the management carried out by the Ministry and public institutions, assessing their progress, difficulties, and results regarding actions that have been undertaken and those planned for the future.
- Explain and justify to citizens the decisions made by the public institution concerning relevant aspects of its management.
- Gather the opinions and concerns of people participating in the participatory public accountability process and respond to the issues raised during the process.

== International relations ==
The Ministry maintains relationships with major international organizations involved in labor affairs and regional integration, with a strong focus on promoting labor inclusion, occupational safety and health, workforce training, and the protection of human rights. Its affiliated organizations include:

- International Labor Organization (ILO): Chile has been a member of the ILO since 1919. The country has ratified 63 conventions, of which 49 are currently in force.
- Pacific Alliance: The Ministry participates in the Pacific Alliance’s Labor Technical Group. This body is responsible for promoting coordination and cooperation with the aim of creating a more integrated, connected, and citizen-oriented regional labor market that contributes to job creation and economic development, with greater well-being and social inclusion for all.
- Organization of American States (OAS): The Ministry is also a member of this organization, a cooperation mechanism among the Ministries of Labor of the Americas that seeks to strengthen their human and institutional capacities.

== Organization ==
=== Undersecretariats ===
- Undersecretariat of Labor (Subsecretaría del Trabajo): Internally administers the functions of both Undersecretariats. Its responsibilities include implementing the Minister’s policies, ensuring compliance with labor laws, directing the administration of the Undersecretariat, and coordinating the Ministry’s actions on labor matters with those of other Ministries and government agencies.
- Undersecretariat of Social Security (Subsecretaría de Previsión Social): Oversees the development of Chile’s social security system, as well as compliance with social security programs.

=== Dependent and/or related agencies ===
Through its Undersecretariats, the Ministry of Labor and Social Security has eight dependent or related agencies.

==== Agencies dependent on or related to the Undersecretariat of Labor ====
- Labor Directorate (Dirección del Trabajo, DT): Its mission is to promote and ensure effective compliance with labor, social security, and occupational safety and health legislation; the full exercise of freedom of association; and social dialogue, fostering fair, equitable, and modern labor relations.
- National Training and Employment Service (Servicio Nacional de Capacitación y Empleo, SENCE): Its mission is to improve the employability of people seeking work or looking to advance their careers through an integrated range of quality policies, programs, and tools, while supporting them through the labor challenges they face. It places particular emphasis on supporting the employment entry and continued employment of vulnerable people.
- ChileValora: Its main function is to formally recognize people’s occupational competencies through certification, regardless of how they acquired their knowledge and whether or not they hold an academic degree or qualification. In this way, it seeks to promote people’s opportunities for lifelong learning, recognition, and appreciation of their skills through assessment and certification processes based on standards defined and validated by productive sectors.
- General Directorate of Pawn Credit (Dirección General del Crédito Prendario, DICREP): Its purpose is to provide pawn loans in a simple and timely manner while safeguarding the items provided as collateral. It also supports the State in government auctions and acts as an auxiliary body of the Judiciary in implementing actions assigned to it.

==== Agencies dependent on or related to the Undersecretariat of Social Security ====
- Labor Safety Institute (Instituto de Seguridad Laboral, ISL): Its mission is to provide occupational safety and health services to affiliated employers and protected workers, actively contributing to the development of a culture of prevention in occupational safety and health. It does this by promoting health and providing the medical and financial benefits resulting from occupational accidents and diseases.
- Social Security Institute (Instituto de Previsión Social, IPS): Its objective is to administer the solidarity pension system and the social security schemes previously administered by the former National Social Security Institute (INP). It is a public service governed by the Senior Public Management System (Sistema de Alta Dirección Pública) established under Law No. 19,882.
- Superintendency of Pensions (Superintendencia de Pensiones, SP): Its mission is to protect people’s pension rights, contributing to the proper functioning of the pension system and unemployment insurance through high-quality regulation and supervision, as well as the timely provision of clear and reliable information.
  - National Ergonomic Commission (Comisión Ergonómica Nacional, CEN)
- Superintendency of Social Security (Superintendencia de Seguridad Social, SUSESO): An autonomous government body responsible for overseeing compliance with social security regulations and ensuring respect for people’s rights, particularly those of workers, pensioners, and their families.

== List of ministers (2010-present) ==
Minister	Party	Term start	Term end	President
Camila Merino	Evópoli	11 March 2010	16 January 2011	Sebastián Piñera
Evelyn Matthei	UDI	16 January 2011	24 July 2013	Sebastián Piñera
Juan Carlos Jobet	RN	24 July 2013	11 March 2014	Sebastián Piñera
Javiera Blanco	Ind. DC	11 March 2014	11 May 2015	Michelle Bachelet
Ximena Rincón	DC	11 May 2015	16 November 2016	Michelle Bachelet
Alejandra Krauss	DC	16 November 2016	11 March 2018	Sebastián Piñera
Nicolás Monckeberg	RN	11 March 2018	28 October 2019	Sebastián Piñera
María José Zaldívar	Independent	28 October 2019	7 April 2021	Sebastián Piñera
Patricio Melero	UDI	7 April 2021	11 March 2022	Sebastián Piñera
Jeannette Jara	PCCh	11 March 2022	7 April 2025	Gabriel Boric
Giorgio Boccardo	FA	7 April 2025	11 March 2026	Gabriel Boric
Tomás Rau	Ind.	11 March 2026	Incumbent	José Antonio Kast
