= Cecilia Pérez Díaz =

Chilean politician

Cecilia Pérez

Minister of Planning
- In office 7 January 2002 – 3 March 2003
- President: Ricardo Lagos
- Preceded by: Alejandra Krauss
- Succeeded by: Andrés Palma Irarrázaval

Personal details
- Born: 8 September 1966 (age 60) Santiago, Chile
- Education: University of Concepción (BA); University of Bordeaux (MA)
- Profession: Social worker

Norma Cecilia Pérez Díaz (born 8 September 1966) is a Chilean social worker who served as minister.

She graduated in 1988 as a social worker, receiving the award for best student. She subsequently obtained a scholarship to undertake postgraduate specialization in regional and local development at the University of Bordeaux in France.

She worked in the public sector at the Municipality of Concepción, the Regional Ministerial Secretariat of Planning in Concepción, and the Social Policy Monitoring Programme of the Ministry of Planning and Cooperation (Mideplan).

== Political career ==
Born to Héctor Pérez García and Norma del Carmen Díaz Vivar, Pérez has described her family background as "very modest and humble". She and her two siblings attended public primary schools and secondary schools. Her father retired on disability due to blindness, while her mother was a homemaker. Because her family lacked the financial means to pay for university studies, she received the President of the Republic Scholarship, which enabled her to study social work at the University of Concepción.

From 1999 to 2002, she served as Executive Director of the Foundation for Overcoming Poverty.

In 2002, President Ricardo Lagos appointed her Minister of Planning and Cooperation as an independent aligned with the Christian Democratic Party.

During her tenure as Minister of Ministry of Planning and Cooperation (Mideplan), the Chile Solidario programme, one of the principal social initiatives of the Lagos administration, was launched to provide support for low-income households.

On 3 March 2003, she left Mideplan to become Minister and Director of the National Women's Service (SERNAM), a position she held until the end of the Lagos administration.

In March 2006, she joined the administration of President Michelle Bachelet as Executive Director of the Fondo de Solidaridad e Inversión Social (FOSIS).
