= National Women's Service (Chile) =

Chilean organization promoting gender equality

- Servicio Nacional de la Mujer
- Abbreviation: SERNAM
- Formation: 1991
- Founder: Soledad Alvear
- Type: GO
- Legal status: Service
- Purpose: Promoting the equality of men and women.
- Professional title: Servicio Nacional de la Mujer
- Location: Chile
- Region served: Chile

The National Women's Service (Spanish: Servicio Nacional de la Mujer; SERNAM) is a public service in Chile, a functionally decentralized organization, with its own funding, which is part of the cabinet-level Ministry of Planning and Cooperation under the President of Chile, created January 3, 1991 by the Law N° 19,023, with the goal of promoting the equality of men and women.

SERNAM's founding mission was to collaborate with the executive in the study and proposal of general plans and measures in order that women may enjoy equality of rights and opportunities with men, in the process of political, social, economic, and cultural development of Chile.

== Organization ==
The upper-level direction, technical and administrative, of SERNAM is charged to the Director of Service, who has the rank of Minister of State, like an Interior Minister or Finance Minister. Its first Director was Soledad Alvear.

In each of the regions in which Chile is divided a Regional Directorship of the National Women's Service exists with its headquarters in the capital city of each respective region. There are 13 regional directorships.

== Minister Directors ==
Minister-Director	Party	Period	President
Soledad Alvear Valenzuela	DC	3 January 1991	Patricio Aylwin Azócar
Josefina Bilbao	Ind	11 March 1994	Eduardo Frei Ruiz-Tagle
Adriana Delpiano Puelma	PPD	11 March 2000	Ricardo Lagos Escobar
Cecilia Pérez Díaz	Ind	11 March 2003	Ricardo Lagos Escobar
Laura Albornoz Pollman	DC	11 March 2006	Michelle Bachelet Jeria
Carmen Andrade Lara	PS	20 October 2009	Michelle Bachelet Jeria
Carolina Schmidt Zaldívar	Ind	11 March 2010	Sebastián Piñera Echenique
Loreto Seguel King	Ind	22 April 2013	Sebastián Piñera Echenique
Claudia Pascual	PC	11 March 2014	Michelle Bachelet Jeria

- DC: Christian Democrat Party of Chile
- PPD: Party for Democracy
- PS: Socialist Party of Chile
- PC: Communist Party of Chile
- Ind: Independent
