= Ministry of Science, Technology, Knowledge and Innovation =

Chilean ministry

- Ministerio de Ciencia, Tecnología, Conocimiento e Innovación
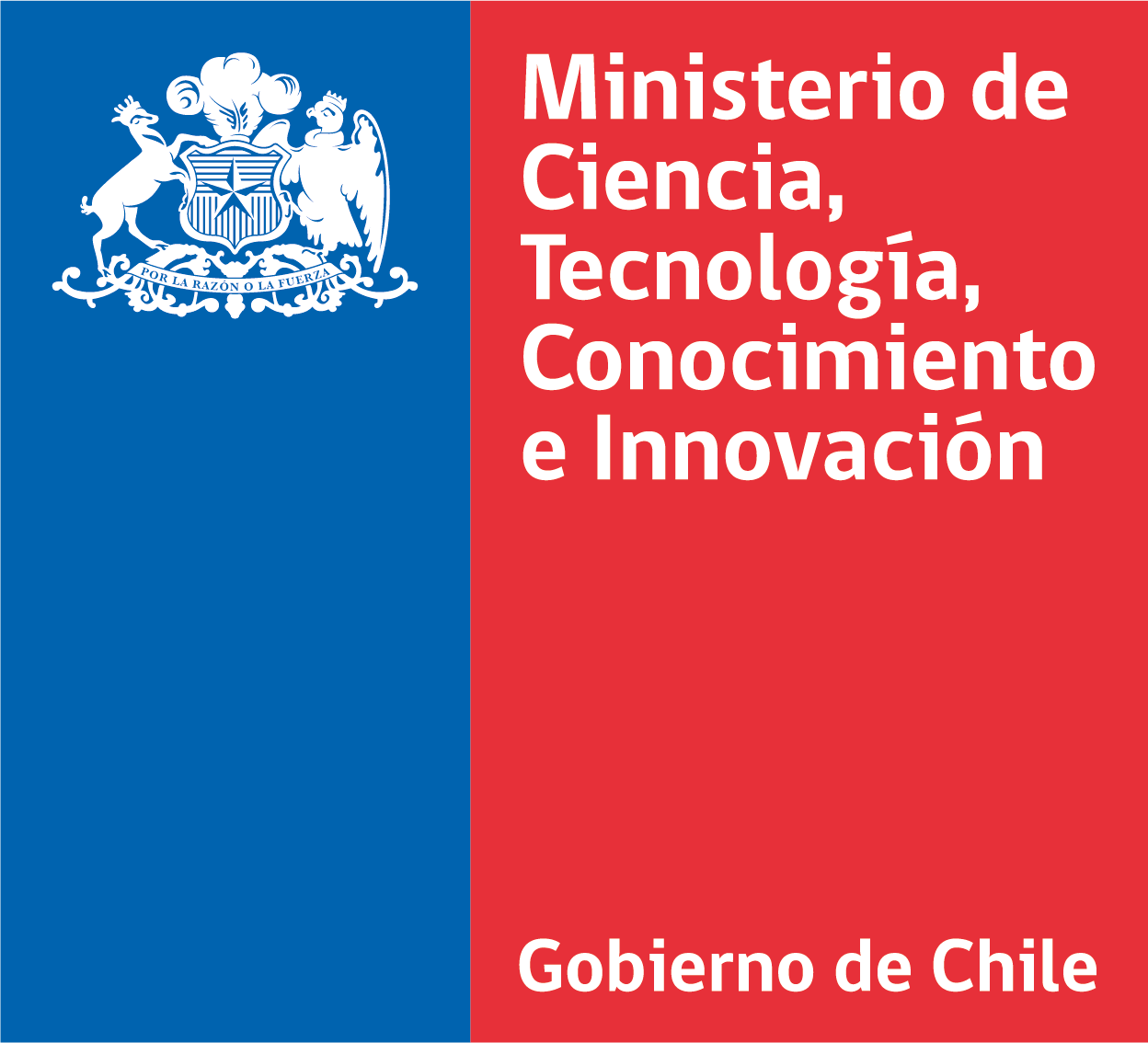

Ministry of Science overview
- Formed: 13 August 2018
- Jurisdiction: National
- Headquarters: Santiago, Chile
- Employees: 412 (2020)
- Annual budget: 430 704 553 thousands peso (2020)
- Minister responsible: Ximena Lincolao, Minister of Science, Technology, Knowledge and Innovation
- Child agencies: Subsecretary of Science, Technology, Knowledge and Innovation; National Research and Development Agency of Chile
- Website: www.minciencia.gob.cl
- Agency ID: MICITEC; MinCiencia

The Ministry of Science, Technology, Knowledge and Innovation (Spanish: Ministerio de Ciencia, Tecnología, Conocimiento e Innovación) is the Ministry of State of Chile in charge of structuring, promoting, coordinating and promoting science, humanities and technological development activities in all their stages, to contribute to the sustainable development and social welfare of the country. It was created as a replacement for the National Commission for Scientific and Technological Research, which was in charge of the Ministry of Education. The current minister is Ximena Lincolao, who was appointed by President José Antonio Kast on 11 March 2026.

It was created during the second government of President Sebastián Piñera promulgated on 27 July 2018, and published in the Official Journal on 13 August of the same year. According to the norm, the President of the Republic had one year to set the date on which the ministry began to operate and which replaced the National Commission for Scientific and Technological Research and the Superior Councils for Science and Technological Development.

== History ==
The ministry was implemented from a national need for an institution that manages to coordinate efforts in science and technology. Currently in Chile it is pointed out that there is a low scientific and social organization of science and technology, the low state economic investment (0.34% of GDP in 2018) and the political institutionality of knowledge generated by research in Chile. National researchers and scientists have marched in 2017 and 2018 demanding improvements to science and technology from part of the government.

On 1 October 2019, the ministry officially begins to function employing 45 permanent officials that include the Minister of Science, the Subsecretary of Science, the officials who helped form the ministry and the five SEREMIs that were appointed by the President of Chile; and by 2020 with nearly 100 employees, including those transferred from the Subsecretary of Economy and the Subsecretary of Education. Originally, their offices were at the Palacio de La Moneda; however, in June 2021, the ministry moves from its offices in the Palacio de la Moneda to its new location on Calle Morandé, one block from the presidential palace.

=== First minister's Announcement ===
After the announcement of the promulgation of the law that creates the ministry, there were many public comments about who could be the new minister of the portfolio; Among the most mentioned names were Hernán Cheyre, director of entrepreneurship at the Universidad del Desarrollo, Álvaro Fischer, member of the National Council of Innovation for Development, Mónica Rubio, Chilean astronomer at the University of Chile, and Mario Hamuy, president of CONICYT.

On 17 December 2018, during the second government of President Sebastian Piñera, the president announced at La Moneda Palace that the neurobiologist Andrés Couve Correa will be the first minister, while the biologist and executive director of the Millennium Scientific Initiative, Carolina Torrealba, was appointed as the Subsecretary of the portfolio.

== Overview ==
According to what is dictated by the law that creates the ministry, its main job is to advise and collaborate with the President of the Republic in the drafting and application of policies, plans and programs that promote and strengthen science, technology and innovation that arises from research, with the purpose of contributing to national development, strengthening cultural, educational, social and economic heritage at various territorial scales. In addition, the ministry must seek methods to coordinate national regulations that promote research as well as to incorporate the knowledge generated by scientific-technological innovation in the development of public policies and public-private initiatives.

On the other hand, it is also responsible for fostering the creation of infrastructure and institutions, the training of professionals and their insertion in the public and/or private environment, fostering the publication and linking of ongoing research with the environment, promoting the formation of scientific culture as well as its assessment and communication, promoting equitable gender participation, taking charge of international treaties, spatial research and development, preservation of the national scientific and technological heritage, among others.

To achieve this, the ministry can propose public regulations, request research, award awards, develop activities focused on scientific dissemination, maintain a database on scientific and technological production and financing in the country, develop national standards regarding infrastructure and research, among other attributions.

== Organization ==
- Ministry of Science, Technology, Knowledge and Innovation
- Subsecretary of Science, Technology, Knowledge and Innovation, on which they depend:
  - Regional Ministerial Secretaries of Science, Technology, Knowledge and Innovation.
    - The five macrozones are Antofagasta, Valparaíso, Concepción, Valdivia y Punta Arenas.
  - Advisory Council of the Ministry of Science, Technology, Knowledge and Innovation
- National Research and Development Agency of Chile
  - National Fund for Scientific and Technological Development (Fondecyt)
- National Council of Science, Technology, Knowledge and Innovation for Development
- Interministerial Committee for Science, Technology, Knowledge and Innovation

== Lists of ministers ==
N°.	Minister	Political party	Start date	Final date	President
1	Andrés Couve	Ind.	17 December 2018	11 March 2022	Sebastián Piñera
2	Flavio Salazar	PCCh	11 March 2022	6 September 2022	Gabriel Boric
3	Silvia Díaz	Ind.	6 September 2022	10 March 2023	Gabriel Boric
4	Aisén Etcheverry	RD	10 March 2023	22 July 2025	Gabriel Boric
4	Aisén Etcheverry	FA	10 March 2023	22 July 2025	Gabriel Boric
5	Aldo Valle	Ind./PS	25 July 2025	11 March 2026	Gabriel Boric
6	Ximena Lincolao	Ind.	11 March 2026	Incumbent	José Antonio Kast
