= Jessica López Saffie =

Chilean politician

Jessica López
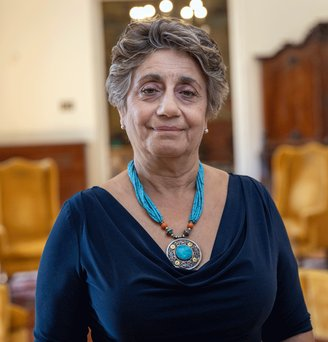
- Jessica López in 2023

Minister of Public Works
- In office 10 March 2023 – 11 March 2026
- President: Gabriel Boric
- Preceded by: Juan Carlos García
- Succeeded by: Martín Arrau

Head of Banco del Estado de Chile
- In office 27 April 2022 – 10 March 2023
- President: Gabriel Boric
- Preceded by: Ricardo de Tezanos
- Succeeded by: Daniel Hojman

Personal details
- Born: 16 December 1956 (age 69) Santiago, Chile
- Party: Communist Party (1970s); Socialist Party
- Parent(s): Armando López; Margarita Saffie
- Education: University of Chile
- Occupation: Politician
- Profession: Economist

Jessica Teresa López Saffie (born 18 December 1956) is a Chilean economist and politician who served as Chile's Minister of Public Works from 2023 to 2026, during the presidency of Gabriel Boric.

Between April 2022 and March 2023, she served as chair of the BancoEstado, becoming the first woman to hold that position.

== Family and education ==
She was born in Santiago on 16 December 1956, the daughter of Armando René López Flandes and Margarita Saffie Cauas, of Palestinian descent. She completed her primary education at Saint Gabriel's School and her secondary education at the Liceo N.º 1 Javiera Carrera. She later pursued higher education in business administration with a specialization in economics at the University of Chile between 1974 and 1978.

During that period, she was a member of the Communist Youth of Chile (JJ.CC), and later affiliated with the Socialist Party of Chile.

== Professional career ==
From 1981 to 1990, she worked at the Banco del Desarrollo —now Scotiabank Chile—, where she held various positions. She later joined the BancoEstado during the presidency of Andrés Sanfuentes. Over a period of 24 years, she served as risk manager, comptroller, and vice-chair of the board of directors.

After a period devoted to corporate advisory work and serving as a consultant for the Inter-American Development Bank (IDB), she returned to BancoEstado in 2014, when President Michelle Bachelet appointed her general manager. She became the first woman to hold that position within a Chilean bank.

She is also a partner and director of the Centro de Integración Cognitivo Corporal (CICC). In December 2018, she assumed the position of executive president of the National Association of Sanitary Services Companies (Andess), succeeding Víctor Galilea Page.

She has also served as a corporate director at Itaú Bank, as an advisor to Comunidad Mujer, and as a board member of the Foro Educativo and TIGRA foundations.

On 26 April 2022, she was appointed chair of BancoEstado by President Gabriel Boric, becoming the first woman to hold that position. She served in that role until 10 March 2023, when, during the second cabinet reshuffle of the Boric administration, she was appointed Minister of Public Works, replacing architect Juan Carlos García Pérez de Arce.
