= Juan Carlos García Pérez de Arce =

Chilean politician

Juan Carlos García
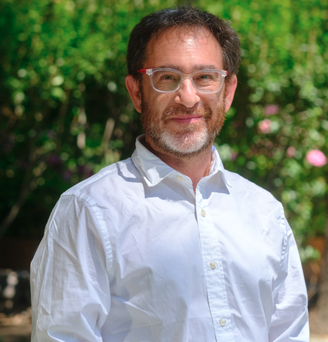
- Juan Carlos García in 2022

Ambassador of Chile to Canada
- In office 11 March 2022 – 11 March 2026
- Appointed by: Gabriel Boric
- Preceded by: Raúl Fernández Daza
- Succeeded by: Jaime Baeza Freer

Minister of Public Works
- In office 11 March 2022 – 9 March 2023
- President: Gabriel Boric
- Preceded by: Alfredo Moreno Charme
- Succeeded by: Jessica López Saffie

Personal details
- Born: 3 January 1971 (age 55) Santiago, Chile
- Party: Liberal Party
- Spouse: Xochitl Poblete
- Children: 2
- Parent(s): Carlos García Lazcano; María Isabel Pérez de Arce Antoncich
- Education: Pontifical Catholic University of Valparaíso (BA); École des ponts ParisTech (PhD)
- Occupation: Architect and politician

Juan Carlos García Pérez de Arce (born 3 January 1971) is a Chilean architect and politician who served as Chile's Minister of Public Works from 2022 to 2023.

== Biography ==
The son of Carlos Alberto García Lazcano and María Isabel Pérez de Arce Antoncich, Juan Carlos earned a BA in architecture at the Pontifical Catholic University of Valparaíso. Later, García completed an MA in urban management at the École Nationale des Ponts et Chaussées in Paris, France.

He worked in the Ministry of Housing and Urban Development, where he collaborated in the declaration of the Valparaíso commune as a UNESCO World Heritage Site.

He has also been an advisor to the Production Development Corporation, where he promoted programs that aimed to encourage private investment in the Valparaíso Region.

== Political career ==
He is a member of the Liberal Party. In 2020, he participated in the Broad Front gubernatorial primaries for the Valparaíso Region, in which he was not elected.

On 21 January 2022, he was appointed Minister of Public Works by President-elect Gabriel Boric. He took office on 11 March 2022. On 11 March 2023, he was succeeded by Jessica López Saffie.

== Personal life ==
He is married to Xochitl Poblete, with whom he has two children.
