= Ximena Lincolao =

Chilean-American educator and technology entrepreneur

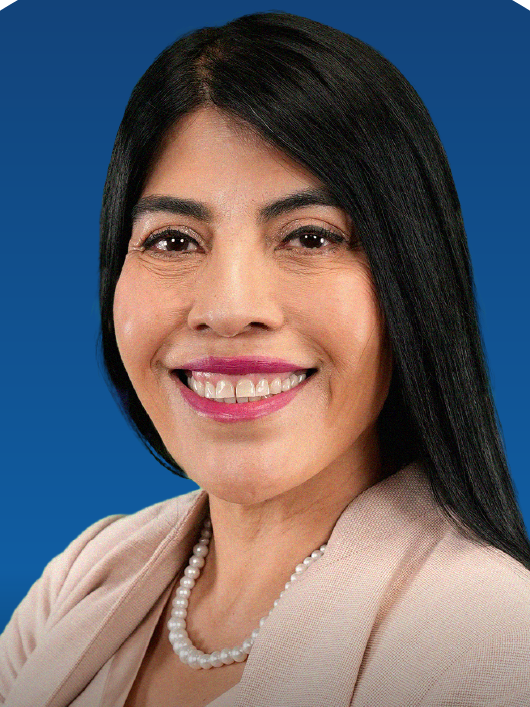

Minister of Science, Technology, Knowledge and Innovation
- Incumbent
- Assumed office March 11, 2026
- President: José Antonio Kast
- Preceded by: Aldo Valle

Personal details
- Born: Ximena Fabiola Lincolao Pilquián; September 15, 1968 (age 58) Santiago, Chile
- Citizenship: Chile; United States
- Party: Independent
- Education: University of La Serena; George Washington University
- Occupation: Educator, entrepreneur, politician

Ximena Fabiola Lincolao Pilquián (Note: Also known as Ximena Lincolao Hartsock, Ximena Lincolao Gates or Ximena Gates Hartsock during her years in the United States.) (born September 15, 1968) is a Chilean-American educator, technology entrepreneur, and civic innovation leader. She is known for her work in civic technology, digital platforms, education, and technology training. Since 11 March 2026, she has served as Minister of Science, Technology, Knowledge and Innovation of Chile under President José Antonio Kast. She is the first Mapuche woman to hold a ministerial position in the history of Chile.

== Early life and education ==
Lincolao was born on September 15, 1968 in Santiago, Chile, to a Catholic, working-class, Mapuche family. She grew up in the General Baquedano neighborhood of Maipú, where her father worked as a salesman at a hardware store and her mother was a homemaker.

She has credited her early exposure to political debate as a formative influence, noting that her family was divided during the Pinochet dictatorship — her mother was a supporter, her father was not — and that the resulting household arguments fueled her interest in politics.

She completed her secondary education at a public high school in Maipú and later moved to La Serena, where she pursued higher education at the University of La Serena, graduating with a degree in Spanish language and philosophy education in 1992.

In 1997, she emigrated to the United States with $500, settling in the Washington, D.C. area without speaking English. She has reflected on her decision to leave, saying that Chile is a very classist country where opportunities are closely tied to one's zip code, and that having indigenous and poor roots did not help. She rented a room from a Panamanian family and found her first job at a bar in Arlington, after searching Spanish-language newspapers. She later worked as a babysitter and domestic helper, averaging 16-hour workdays seven days a week, saving money first for English lessons and then to buy a car. She eventually found work as a government assistant in the district, which launched her professional career.

== Career ==
=== Early career in the United States ===
After completing a Doctor of Education (Ed.D.) at the Graduate School of Education and Human Development, George Washington University, in 2004, Lincolao continued her career in the District of Columbia Public Schools (DCPS), serving as assistant principal at Harriet Tubman Elementary School before becoming principal of Ross Elementary School, where her students posted gains in reading and mathematics on the DC Comprehensive Assessment System (DC CAS).

In 2007, following Mayor Adrian Fenty's reorganization of DCPS under mayoral control, she was selected to serve on Chancellor Michelle Rhee's inaugural transition team, working on school leadership, bilingual education, and foreign language access. She subsequently served as deputy chief of the Office of Teaching and Learning — a role equivalent to deputy superintendent of instruction — overseeing after-school, weekend, and summer school programs across more than 100 schools, with budget responsibility comparable in scale to the Department of Parks and Recreation. In this capacity she also led reforms including the expansion of online learning, International Baccalaureate and Dual Language programs, and a credit recovery program for students at risk of dropping out that contributed to improvements in the district's historically low graduation rates. Savings redirected from DCPS central office consolidation during the Rhee era were used to place out-of-school-time coordinators in every elementary and middle school in the district, enabling principals to remain focused on academic instruction during the school day.

=== Department of Parks and Recreation ===
In April 2009, Mayor Fenty appointed Lincolao as acting director of the Department of Parks and Recreation (DPR), replacing Clark Ray. Fenty selected her without interviewing any other candidate, stating that her programming expertise made her "the right person at the right time" to take the agency's programming "to the next level." In the role she managed a $41 million annual operating budget and more than 1,000 employees.

During her tenure as acting director, Lincolao oversaw renovations of DC public pools, including completion of the District's state-of-the-art aquatic facility Wilson Pool, and the construction of numerous athletic fields and parks across the city. She launched wellness programs for seniors, youth and families across the city's recreation centers.

In July 2009, Lincolao partnered with the United States Tennis Association (USTA), the Washington Kastles professional tennis team, and community nonprofit A-Team Tennis and Learning to launch the QuickStart Tennis program — a citywide initiative that expanded youth tennis enrollment from several hundred to between 3,000 and 4,000 children, reaching areas of the city where tennis had not previously been available through portable courts and equipment donated by the USTA. Tennis champion Venus Williams participated in the program launch. Lincolao stated of the initiative: "In the past, we have not really had a real program to teach our youth tennis across the city."

In August 2009, DPR secured a NikeGO Places grant of up to $50,000, in partnership with Nike and LeBron James, to refurbish an outdoor basketball court at the Barry Farm Recreation Center in Ward 8, one of the city's most underserved neighborhoods.

In October 2009, Lincolao joined Mayor Fenty for the groundbreaking of Justice Park, a new community garden park at 14th and Euclid Streets NW developed in partnership with Ward 1 residents.

Following her departure from DPR, Lincolao served as Chief of Staff to the City Administrator of Washington, D.C., completing her tenure in the Fenty administration.

==== Confirmation hearing and council rejection ====
Her nomination for the permanent director position was subject to a contentious confirmation hearing before the DC Council's parks committee on October 2, 2009. The hearing drew widespread condemnation for the racial and gender-based nature of questioning directed at Lincolao.

Council member Marion Barry (D-Ward 8) questioned her qualifications on cultural grounds, stating the parks department serves people who are "black and brown... that is who we are. We have a culture that is different. We have a subculture that is different," and questioned whether she could relate to African American residents. Barry also suggested that women have a different attitude toward athletics than men, and raised questions about why Lincolao, born in Chile and a legal permanent resident, was not a US citizen. Barry was unrepentant, telling reporters he had received only "compliments" about his remarks.

Committee chair Harry Thomas Jr. (D-Ward 5), who led the opposition to her confirmation, gave "short shrift to the testimony of supporters while fawning over her critics, mainly park department employees — or their relatives — who either were fired by Ms. Hartsock or disagreed with her policies." Speakers at the hearing called Lincolao "the devil and a liar."

The Washington Post editorial board condemned the hearing, calling the council's conduct "political spite" and identifying Barry as "the worst culprit." Thomas subsequently published a letter in the Washington Post defending the council's decision on procedural grounds, citing concerns about personnel practices during her tenure.

In an interview with NPR's Scott Simon, Lincolao responded to the hearing: "More than offended, I am disturbed and to some extent feel very embarrassed too that we are the nation's capital and that race and gender can become an issue on a confirmation hearing... as a resident of the District of Columbia, I feel disturbed and just deeply appalled and embarrassed about what happened."

The DC Council voted to formally disapprove her nomination — an unusual step that went beyond simply withholding confirmation — and Mayor Fenty subsequently appointed Jesús Aguirre as the new DPR director in December 2009. Several members of the DC Council who opposed or presided over Lincolao's confirmation subsequently faced federal criminal charges, reflecting what prosecutors described as a broader culture of corruption within the council during this period.

Harry Thomas Jr., who chaired the council committee that oversaw DPR and led the opposition to Lincolao's confirmation, was subsequently convicted on federal theft and tax charges. According to the FBI, Thomas had steered $353,500 in taxpayer funds earmarked for youth arts, youth baseball, and summer programs to entities he personally controlled, using the money to purchase a luxury SUV, a motorcycle, expensive clothing, and vacations. The scheme ran from July 2007 through August 2009 — the same period during which Thomas chaired the parks committee and presided over Lincolao's confirmation hearing. U.S. Attorney Ronald Machen stated: "He fostered a public persona as an advocate for underprivileged kids at the same time he was funneling tax dollars set aside for youth programs to his own bank accounts." Thomas pleaded guilty in January 2012 and was sentenced to 38 months in federal prison. He was the first sitting member of the DC Council to be charged with and convicted of a felony.

Marion Barry, whose racial and gender-based remarks at the hearing drew condemnation from the Washington Post editorial board, had a long history of legal difficulties, most notably his 1990 arrest on drug charges while serving as mayor, for which he served six months in federal prison.

Council member Michael A. Brown, who served on the council during the confirmation vote, was subsequently convicted on federal bribery charges after accepting $55,000 in cash payments from undercover FBI agents posing as government contractors seeking preferential treatment. He pleaded guilty in June 2013 and was sentenced to 39 months in prison — the third sitting DC Council member within three years to plead guilty to federal charges while in office.

Council chairman Kwame R. Brown, who presided over the council during the period of Lincolao's confirmation, was subsequently convicted on federal bank fraud charges after falsifying loan applications to obtain more than $200,000 in personal loans. He resigned from office and pleaded guilty in June 2012, becoming the second DC Council member that year to plead guilty to federal charges while in office.

=== Civic technology and entrepreneurship ===
In 2012, Lincolao co-founded Phone2Action, a digital advocacy and civic engagement software platform designed to connect citizens with elected officials and facilitate civic engagement in legislative and social processes. The platform, launched in 2013, enabled nonprofits, associations and corporations to mobilize supporters through text, email, phone and social media to contact policymakers at the local, state and federal level.

Phone2Action grew to become the leading grassroots advocacy software platform in the United States, at its peak contributing nearly 25 percent of all advocacy messages sent to Congress. By 2020, more than 25 million people had used the platform, and tools deployed for the 2020 election drew 10 million visits. Clients included Airbnb, Lyft, Patagonia, Ben & Jerry's, Walmart, eBay, Expedia, the National Restaurant Association, the American Nurses Association, and the Alzheimer's Impact Movement, among others.

The platform was used in a number of high-profile civic campaigns across the political and social spectrum. In 2017, outdoor retailer Patagonia used Phone2Action to mobilize thousands of supporters to contact Utah Governor Gary Herbert in defense of Bears Ears National Monument following the Trump administration's reduction of federal protected lands; Patagonia's advocacy page bore the banner "The president stole your land. Defend the land you have left. Powered by Phone2Action." The Women's March, which organized one of the largest single-day protests in US history following the 2017 presidential inauguration, used Phone2Action as part of its ongoing advocacy infrastructure. In 2018, nearly 150 major companies including Walmart, Patagonia and Lyft joined the nonpartisan "Time to Vote" campaign, using Phone2Action's SMS shortcode platform to help employees and customers check their voter registration status; Walmart alone reached tens of thousands of people through its stores and intranet. The NAACP used Phone2Action's text shortcode technology in a billboard campaign in New York City's Times Square to drive civic engagement at scale. In 2020, HeadCount used Phone2Action's software as the basis for a celebrity voter registration contest platform through which artists including Camila Cabello offered video chats with fans who verified their voter registration status; HeadCount's executive director described it as a "technology hack" that helped them register over 400,000 voters — more than double their previous record.

In 2017, Phone2Action hosted the inaugural Good Tech Summit at Carnegie Library in Washington, DC, convening government and industry leaders including Apple co-founder Steve Wozniak, Facebook's North America marketing director, and members of Congress to explore the future of civic technology and digital advocacy.

Lincolao was recognized as a thought leader in civic technology management, contributing to Entrepreneur magazine on the application of data-driven performance management to technology companies. In the article, she described adapting the CitiStat accountability system developed by Martin O'Malley during his tenure as Mayor of Baltimore — and later implemented in Washington, D.C. as CapSTAT under Mayor Fenty — into a management framework she called ActionSTAT at Phone2Action. O'Malley, who later ran for president and served as a speaker at Phone2Action's inaugural Good Tech Summit, credited the CitiStat system with saving Baltimore an estimated $350 million between 1999 and 2007.

In 2019, Frontier Growth, a Charlotte-based growth equity firm, invested in Phone2Action from its $700 million Frontier Fund V. In 2020, the company acquired GovPredict, a Y-Combinator-backed legislative and regulatory tracking platform, and KnowWho, described as the world's largest directory of public officials and policymakers. Jeb Ory, co-founder and president of the successor company Capitol Canary, described Phone2Action and competitor Quorum as having been "instrumental in creating the market for public affairs and digital advocacy." Lincolao departed the company in early 2021 to pursue a new venture. Phone2Action subsequently rebranded as Capitol Canary and was acquired by Quorum in 2022, creating a combined platform serving over 2,000 clients including more than 50 percent of the Fortune 100.

In 2016, Forbes recognized Lincolao as one of five women mobilizing the Latino community in the United States.

Following the sale of Phone2Action, Lincolao co-founded BuildWithin in 2022 with Michelle Rhee, former chancellor of DC Public Schools, launching with $2.4 million in pre-seed funding led by Dundee Venture Capital with participation from Black Capital, alongside approximately $8 million in government grants. BuildWithin is a technology company focused on workforce development, digital skills training, and apprenticeship programs aimed at expanding access to employment in the digital economy. The venture grew directly from Lincolao's experience at Phone2Action, where an internal apprenticeship program running for eight years became the pipeline for approximately 30 percent of the company's workforce, with alumni going on to work at companies including Google, Uber and Amazon.

BuildWithin received a $7.9 million grant from the US Department of Labor's Apprenticeship Building America program. In 2024, the company helped launch nearly 700 new registered apprenticeships connecting job-seekers with more than 70 employers, and secured DOL approval for 18 new registered apprenticeship occupations in fields including artificial intelligence, healthcare and startup leadership. Notable partnerships include the University of Tennessee's first-ever teacher apprenticeship program, United Airlines' tech apprenticeship program, and selection as convener of DC's Capital Workforce Innovation Consortium.

In 2024, Lincolao was featured on the Chilean public television program 10 chilenas que están cambiando el mundo, broadcast by Televisión Nacional de Chile, highlighting her international career and influence.

=== Minister of Science, Technology, Knowledge and Innovation ===
On January 20, 2026, President-elect José Antonio Kast announced Lincolao as his nominee for Minister of Science, Technology, Knowledge and Innovation. She assumed office on March 11, 2026 as an independent member of the cabinet. With her appointment, she became the first Mapuche woman to serve as a cabinet minister in Chilean history, and the third person of Mapuche descent to hold a ministerial position, after Venancio Coñuepán and Francisco Huenchumilla.

==== Assault at the Austral University of Chile ====
On April 8, 2026, Lincolao was assaulted during an official visit to the Austral University of Chile in Valdivia, during the inauguration of the academic year. The incident occurred amid student protests over science and higher education funding policies, including budget cuts, the suspension of graduate scholarship programs abroad, and criticism of the Crédito con Aval del Estado student loan system.

The protests escalated into physical attacks against the minister, forcing the suspension of the event and her evacuation. According to press reports, she remained sheltered inside the building for approximately two hours before being safely removed from the premises. President Kast condemned the incident and announced that the government would file criminal charges against those responsible for the attack on a government authority. Political figures across the spectrum publicly repudiated the incident.

== Personal life ==
Lincolao has been married twice. In accordance with U.S. custom, during her first marriage she used the surname Hartsock; following her second marriage, she adopted the surname Gates. She became a naturalized U.S. citizen and has lived the greater part of her adult life in the United States.
