= List of heads of government who have visited the South Pole =

The South Pole, located at the heart of the Antarctic continent, has been visited by three Heads of Government throughout history.

Image	Name	Country	Year of Visit	Details
	Helen Clark	New Zealand	2007	Prime Minister of New Zealand from 1999 to 2008. She was the first head of government to visit the South Pole, highlighting her country’s commitment to Antarctic research.
	Jens Stoltenberg	Norway	2011	Prime Minister of Norway in 2011. He visited the South Pole to celebrate the centenary of his compatriot Roald Amundsen’s achievement as the first explorer to reach the South Pole.
	Gabriel Boric	Chile	2025	First head of government from Ibero-America to visit the South Pole and first head of state of the World. His trip was part of the Polar Star Operation III, highlighting Chile’s role in the Antarctic Treaty System, the country’s sovereignty claim over Antarctic territory, and its commitment to scientific research and environmental protection.
