= Flavio Salazar =

Chilean politician (born 1965)

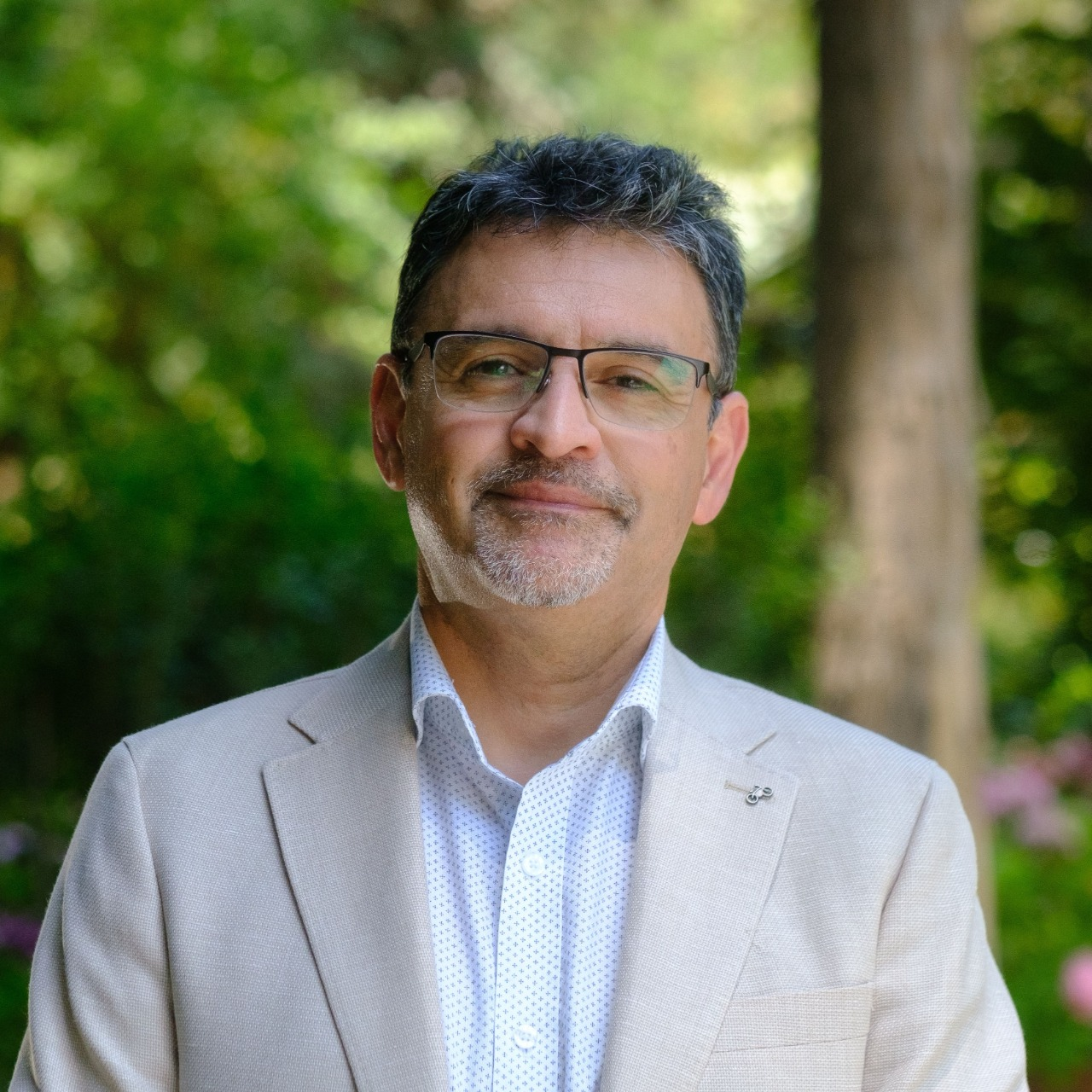

Minister of Science, Technology, Knowledge and Innovation
- In office 11 March 2022 – 6 September 2022
- President: Gabriel Boric
- Preceded by: Andrés Couve
- Succeeded by: Silvia Díaz

Personal details
- Born: 7 October 1965 (age 60) Buenos Aires, Argentina
- Party: Communist Party
- Education: Uppsala University (B.Sc); Karolinska Institute (Ph.D.)
- Occupation: Politician
- Profession: Biologist

Flavio Andrés Salazar Onfray (born 7 October 1965) is a Chilean politician who served as the minister of science, technology, knowledge and innovation from March to September 2022.

== Biography ==
=== Family and education ===
Flavio Andrés was born on 7 October 1965 in Buenos Aires, the capital of Argentina. He is the son of Manuel Segundo Salazar Maturana and Sonia del Carmen Onfray Gajardo.

He completed his primary education at Public School No. 247 in Quinta Normal and his secondary education at the Juan Bosco High School. He continued his higher education in Sweden, earning a Bachelor of Science in biotechnology at Uppsala University between 1988 and 1992, and later completed a PhD in immunology at the Karolinska Institute, graduating in 1998.

He is married to lawyer Elena María Francisca Valderas Fernández, who has worked at the Ministry of Public Works since February 2007.

=== Professional career ===
In 1999, he joined the Faculty of Medicine at the University of Chile as an assistant professor. He later became a full professor at the Institute of Biomedical Sciences. From 2014 to 2022, he served as Vice-Rector for Research and Development at the University of Chile.

In 2009, he assumed the position of alternate director of the Millennium Institute on Immunology and Immunotherapy. That same year, he served as president of the Latin American Association of Immunology. He left his duties in March 2022 following his appointment as a minister of state.

In parallel, in 2009 he was part of President Michelle Bachelet’s delegation during a state visit to India, and in 2007 and 2008 he was named a finalist for the Avonni Award by the Forum for Innovation of the Ministry of Economy, Development and Reconstruction and the private sector.

Among other activities, he served as president of the Chilean Society of Immunology and of the Latin American Association of Immunological Societies (ALAI). He also chaired the board of the technology cluster KnowHub Chile and is a member of the board of the International Human Phenome Consortium (IHPC).

In 2023, he was inducted as a corresponding member of the Chilean Academy of Sciences. Since 2024, he has been a member of the Strategic Advisory Group on Strengthening Regional Capacities for Innovation and Production of Medicines and Other Health Technologies of the Pan American Health Organization.
