= Gabriel Boric =

President of Chile from 2022 to 2026

His Excellency Gabriel Boric
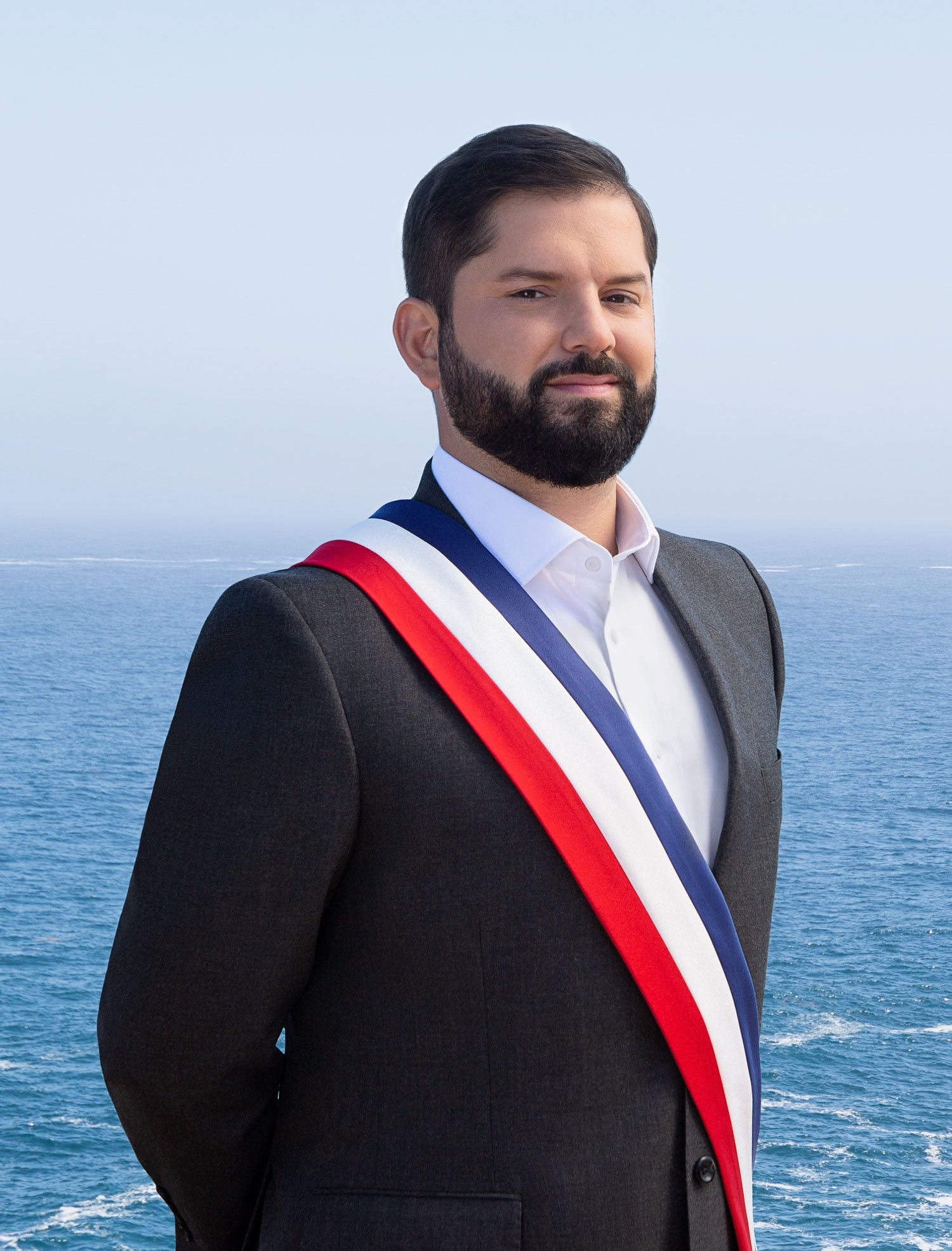
- Official portrait, 2022

38th President of Chile
- In office 11 March 2022 – 11 March 2026
- Preceded by: Sebastián Piñera
- Succeeded by: José Antonio Kast

Member of the Chamber of Deputies
- In office 11 March 2014 – 11 March 2022
- Preceded by: Miodrag Marinović
- Succeeded by: Javiera Morales
- Constituency: District 60 (2014–2018); District 28 (2018–2022)

President of the University of Chile Student Federation
- In office 19 December 2011 – 28 November 2012
- Preceded by: Camila Vallejo
- Succeeded by: Andrés Fielbaum

Personal details
- Born: Gabriel Borić Font; 11 February 1986 (age 40) Punta Arenas, Chile
- Party: Broad Front (2024–present)
- Other political affiliations: Autonomous Left (2008–2016); Autonomist Movement (2016–2018); Broad Front (2017–2024); Social Convergence (2018–2024); Apruebo Dignidad (2021–2023); Unidad por Chile (2022–present); Unity for Chile (2023)
- Domestic partner(s): Irina Karamanos (2019–2023); Paula Carrasco (2024–present)
- Children: 1
- Relatives: Vladimiro Boric Crnosija (grand-uncle)
- Education: University of Chile (no degree)

Gabriel Boric Font (Spanish: [ɡaˈβɾjel ˈβoɾitʃ ˈfont]; (Note: In isolation, Boric is pronounced [ˈboɾitʃ].); born 11 February 1986) is a Chilean politician who served as President of Chile from 2022 to 2026. He previously served two consecutive terms as a member of the Chamber of Deputies of Chile from 2014 to 2022.

Born in Punta Arenas to a family of Croatian and Catalan descent, Boric studied law at the University of Chile without completing his degree. He rose to national prominence as a student leader during the 2011–2013 Chilean student protests, heading the University of Chile Student Federation. First elected to the Chamber of Deputies as an independent in 2013, he was re-elected in 2017 under the Broad Front coalition. In 2018, he co-founded the Social Convergence party. During the 2019 civil unrest, he helped broker the agreement that led to the 2020 constitutional referendum.

In December 2021, Boric won the presidential election, defeating José Antonio Kast in the second round with 55.9% of the vote. Upon taking office on 11 March 2022, he became the youngest president in Chilean history. His cabinet was the first in the Americas with a female majority. A proposed new constitution supported by his government was rejected by voters in September 2022.

== Early life ==
=== Family ===
Gabriel Boric was born in Punta Arenas in 1986. On his father's side, Boric hails from a Croatian-Chilean family with roots in Ugljan, an island off the Adriatic coast of Croatia. Despite his ancestors' (Note: His great-grandfather Ive Borić, his great-grandmother Božica Crnošija, and his great-granduncle Šimo Borić.) migration from the Austro-Hungarian Empire to Chile in 1897, Boric maintains connections with his relatives residing in Ugljan. His great-grandfather, Juan Boric (Ive Borić Barešić), along with his brother Simón (Šime), arrived in Punta Arenas around 1885, being among the initial ten Croats to settle in Magallanes. They ventured into the Tierra del Fuego gold rush in the Magallanes region, spending time on the islands south of the Beagle Channel. Subsequently, Juan Boric briefly returned to Ugljan to marry, and brought his wife, Natalia Crnosija, back to Magallanes, where ten of their eleven children were born. Boric's grandfather, Luis Boric Crnosija, born in 1908, was one of them.

Gabriel Boric's father, Luis Boric Scarpa, is a chemical engineer who served as a government employee at Empresa Nacional del Petróleo for over 40 years. His mother, María Soledad Font Aguilera, is of Catalan descent. Gabriel Boric has two brothers, Simón and Tomás. In the Patagonian region of Magallanes, Boric's granduncle, Vladimiro Boric, became the first bishop of Punta Arenas. Another granduncle, Roque Scarpa Martinich, assumed the role of the first intendant of the Magallanes Region following the military dictatorship. Both Roque Scarpa and Gabriel Boric's father were members of the Christian Democratic Party. Yet another granduncle, Roque Esteban Scarpa, won the 1980 Chilean National Prize for Literature, and his granduncle Vicente Boric was also a writer.

=== Education ===
Boric studied at The British School in his hometown before moving to Santiago in 2004 to attend law school at the University of Chile. He completed his coursework in 2009, coinciding with his appointment as the President of the Law School students' union. Afterward, he focused on preparing for his final exam and fulfilling his mandatory internship. However, he did not pass the test in 2011 and chose not to retake it. Boric did not obtain a law degree and has expressed in interviews that he never intended to pursue a career as a lawyer, instead aspiring to become a writer.

During his university years, Boric had the opportunity to work as an assistant to Professor José Zalaquett in his human rights course. Zalaquett commended Boric for his inclination to question and doubt, as revealed in an interview.

== Political career ==
=== Student politics ===
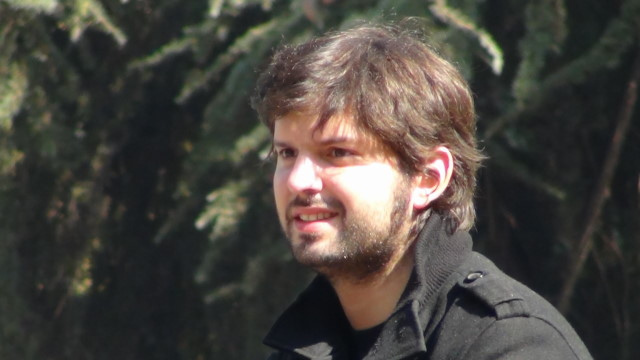
Boric as President of the University of Chile Students Federation, 2012

In 1999 and 2000, Boric played an active role in re-establishing the Federation of Secondary School Students of Punta Arenas. While attending university, he became a member of the political collective Autonomous Left (Izquierda Autónoma), originally known as Autonomous Students (Estudiantes Autónomos). In 2008, he served as an advisor to the Students' Union of the Law Department, and in 2009, he assumed the presidency. During his tenure, he led a 44-day protest against the dean, Roberto Nahum. From 2010 to 2012, Boric represented students as a university senator.

Boric ran for the presidency of the University of Chile Student Federation (FECh) in the 5–6 December 2011 elections, as part of the Creando Izquierda list. He won the election with 30.52% of the votes, defeating Camila Vallejo, who was the incumbent president of the federation and sought re-election as part of the Communist Youth of Chile list. As president of the FECh, Boric played a prominent role in the second phase of the student protests that originated in 2011, emerging as one of the primary spokespersons for the Federation of Chilean Students. In 2012, he was featured on the list of 100 young leaders of Chile, published by El Sábado magazine of the newspaper El Mercurio in collaboration with Adolfo Ibáñez University.

=== Member of Chamber of Deputies (2014–2022) ===
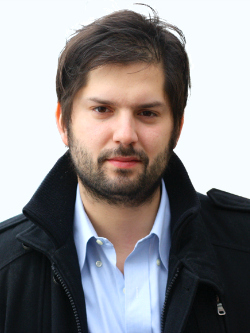
2014 (first)

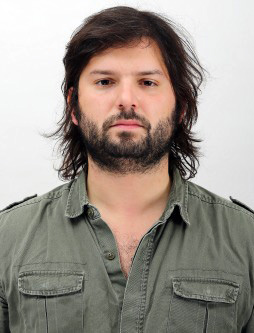
2014 (second)

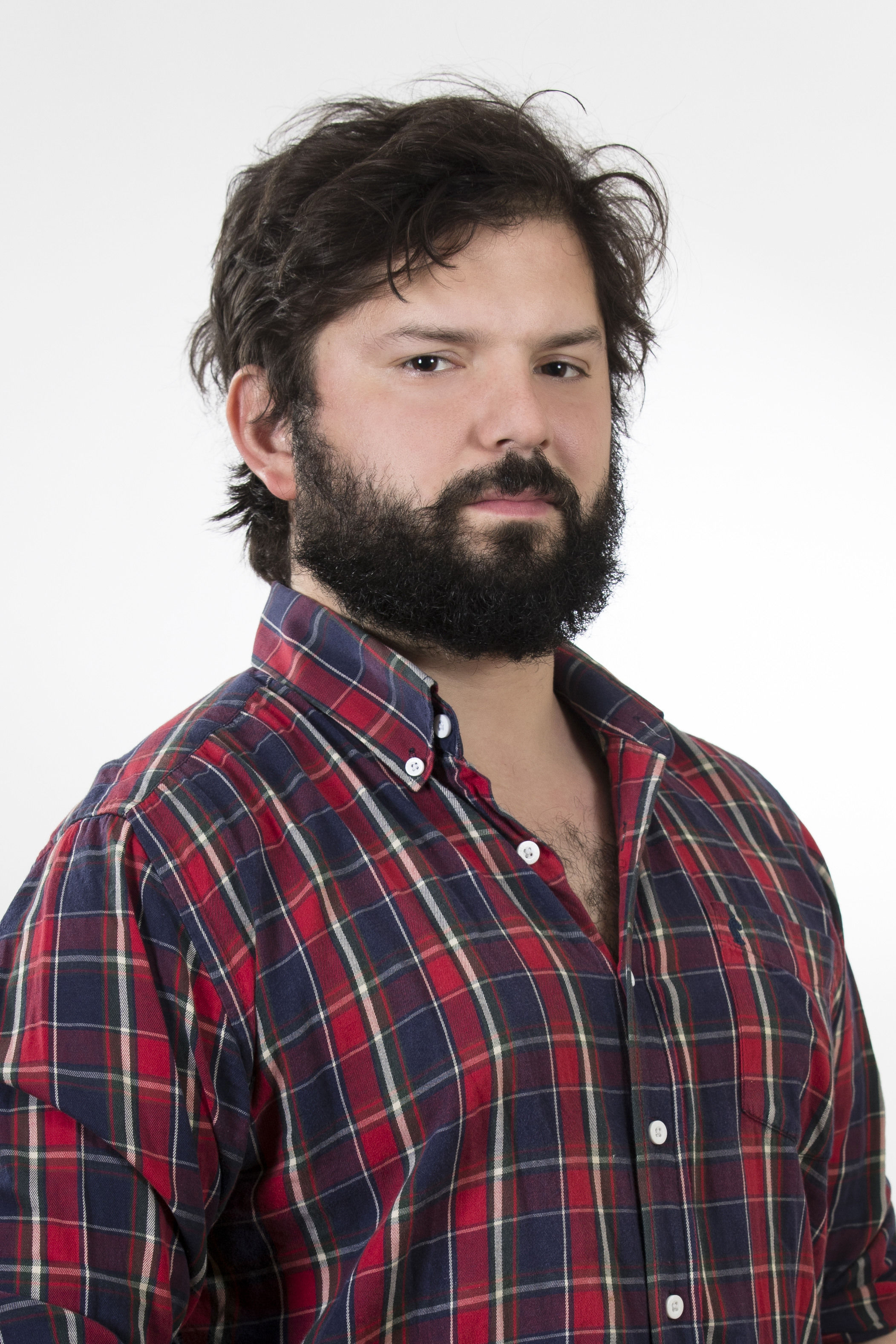
2018

Official portraits of Gabriel Boric as a deputy

Boric participated in the 2013 parliamentary elections as an independent candidate for District 60, currently District 28, representing the Region of Magallanes and the Chilean Antarctic (Región de Magallanes y de la Antártica Chilena, in spanish). He achieved a significant victory with 15,418 votes (26.2%), the highest number received by any candidate in the region. Notably, Boric's successful election outside of an electoral coalition was widely acknowledged by the media, as it broke through the Chilean binomial election system. On 11 March 2014, Boric was sworn in as a member of the Chamber of Deputies.

During his first term, Boric actively served on several commissions, including Human Rights and Indigenous Peoples; Extreme Zones and the Chilean Antarctic; and Labour and Social Security. He was part of the "student bench" (bancada estudiantil), which consisted of other young elected deputies, such as Camila Vallejo, Giorgio Jackson, and Karol Cariola. Together, they played a prominent role in debates concerning the educational reforms proposed by Michelle Bachelet's second government. Boric's popularity in Chile was reflected in various opinion polls.

In 2016, the Autonomous Left disbanded due to disagreements regarding the collective's future. Boric advocated for a more institutional approach and dialogue with Bachelet's center-left government. However, the leadership of the Autonomous Left preferred to focus on student politics. Boric and his allies, driven by a "compulsion for rapid rise," according to Carlos Ruiz of the Autonomous Left, founded the Autonomist Movement. They intended to collaborate with other political forces and establish a new leftist coalition similar to the Uruguayan Broad Front. The Autonomist Movement achieved favorable electoral results, as exemplified by Jorge Sharp, one of Boric's close friends, who was elected mayor of Valparaíso in the 2016 municipal elections.

In January 2017, Boric's movement, together with other new parties and collectives including Jackson's Democratic Revolution, launched the Chilean Broad Front (Frente Amplio). Boric played a leadership role in Beatriz Sánchez's campaign during the 2017 presidential election. After Sánchez placed third and failed to qualify for the second round, Boric reluctantly supported Alejandro Guillier as a means to defeat Sebastián Piñera, although Piñera ultimately emerged victorious.

In the 2017 general election, Boric sought re-election as an independent candidate supported by the Humanist Party, one of the founding members of the Broad Front. He received 18,626 votes (32.8%), an increase compared to 2013, making him the second most voted deputy in the country at that time. Boric served on the Commissions for Extreme Zones and the Chilean Antarctic, as well as Constitution, Legislation, Justice, and Regulation.

The Broad Front's commendable performance in the 2017 elections, where it became Chile's third largest political force, prompted the coalition and its members to undergo reorganization. In 2018, the Autonomist Movement, along with the Libertarian Left and other smaller movements, decided to merge and establish a political party called Social Convergence.

In 2019 Comisión de Ética sanctioned Boric for displaying a t-shirt with right-wing senator Jaime Guzmán gunned. As result of this Boric lost 5% of his salary.

=== Role in the Estallido social ===
On 18 October 2019, protests against the increased tariffs in the Santiago transport system sparked the Estallido social ("Social Outburst"), the largest civil unrest in the country since the end of the military dictatorship. As riots erupted in various parts of the capital, President Piñera declared a state of emergency in Santiago, which was later extended to all major cities as the protests escalated. The protesters incorporated demands concerning the high cost of living, corruption, and inequality, among other issues.

Boric emerged as a vocal critic of the government's response and strongly opposed the use of the Chilean Armed Forces to suppress the protests. He even confronted a group of soldiers deployed in Plaza Italia. Additionally, he played a significant role as one of the accusers in the impeachment trial against Interior Minister Andrés Chadwick. Chadwick was found guilty of serious constitutional violations and a failure to safeguard human rights during the state of emergency, resulting in a five-year ban from public office. Boric also supported the impeachment of President Piñera, although the attempt was ultimately rejected.

Despite being a prominent critic of the government's handling of the protests, Boric was willing to engage in dialogue with other political forces to find a solution to the crisis. Conversations between him and right-wing politicians contributed to an agreement that paved the way for the establishment of the Constitutional Convention, tasked with writing a new Constitution. On 15 November 2019, the "Agreement for Social Peace and the New Constitution" was signed by the presidents of the political parties represented in parliament, excluding the Communist Party and some members of the Broad Front, including Social Convergence. Boric signed the agreement as an individual, which led to accusations against him from some members of his party. As a result, several individuals, including his personal friend Jorge Sharp, resigned from the party. Other parties such as the Green Ecologist Party, the Humanist Party, the Equality Party, the Pirate Party, and the Libertarian Left also opposed the agreement and left the Broad Front.

On 20 December, Boric faced an attack at Parque Forestal where individuals threw spit and beer at him while calling him a "traitor" and "sell-out" due to his involvement in the "Agreement for Social Peace and a New Constitution" reached with traditional politicians. Despite the provocation, Boric remained composed and did not leave his position.

=== 2021 presidential candidacy ===
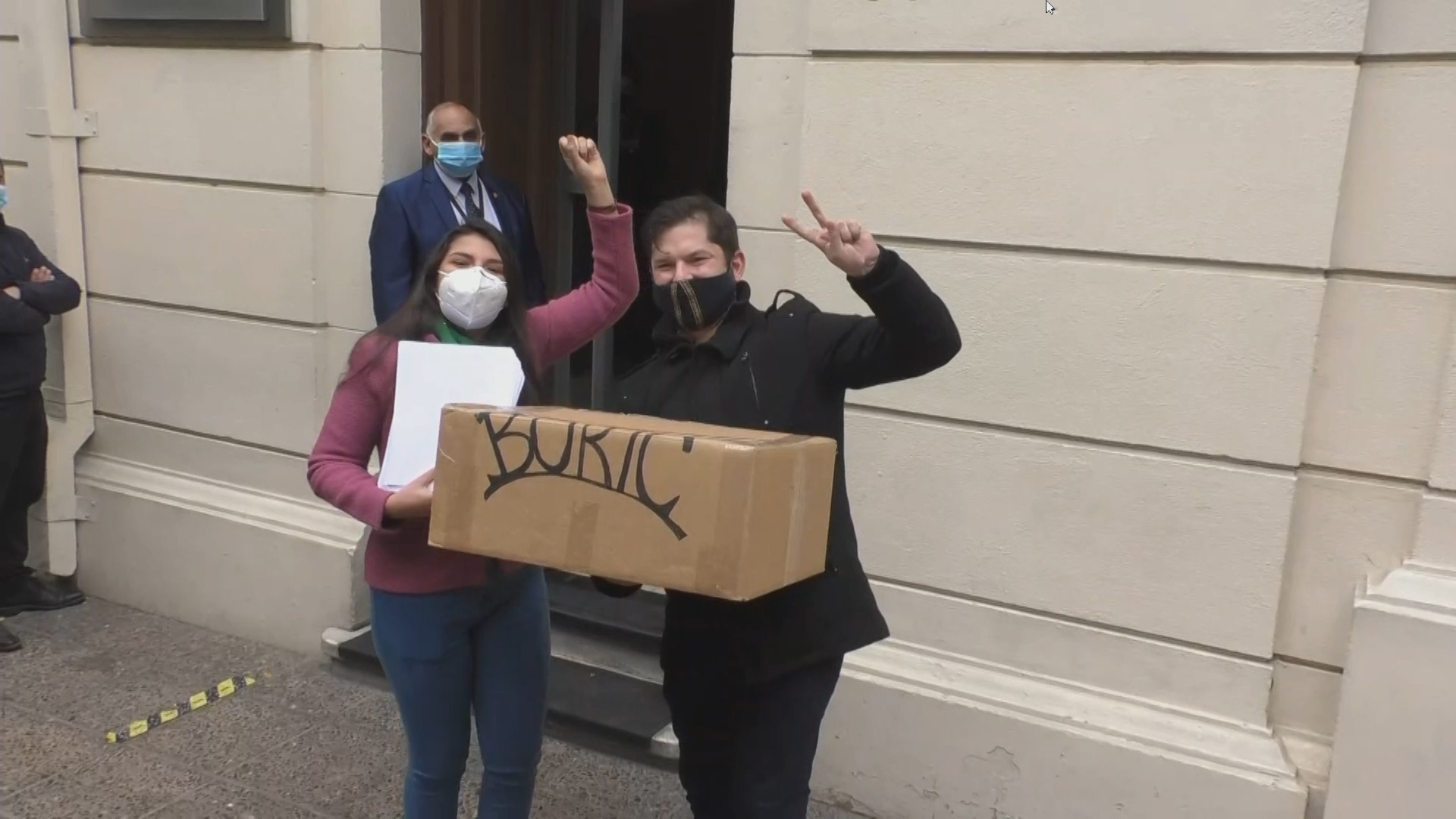
Boric presents the signatures required to run as a presidential candidate

During 2020, the conflict between the Chilean government and its citizens escalated due to the impact of the COVID-19 pandemic. While the country was under lockdown, civil unrest was temporarily suspended. This situation, coupled with the shared campaign for the constitutional referendum, helped to unite the left and center-left opposition, particularly the Broad Front and Chile Digno ("Chile of Dignity"), an alliance led by the Communist Party. In the October 2020 referendum, 78% of voters supported the idea of drafting a new Constitution, leading to discussions on how to form a united opposition for the May 2021 elections, which included mayors, regional governors, and members of the Constitutional Convention.

Gabriel Boric, a key figure, advocated for coordination among all parties and the formation of fewer electoral lists to prevent voter dispersion. Eventually, the Broad Front and Chile Digno reached an agreement and presented a joint list called Apruebo Dignidad ("I Approve of Dignity"), which became the second largest bloc in the Constitutional Convention, behind the united pact of the right called Vamos por Chile ("Let's Go for Chile"). Apruebo Dignidad also saw increased support in local and regional elections, positioning itself as a competitive option for the general election in November 2021.

Daniel Jadue, the Communist mayor of Recoleta, was initially the favored candidate to represent the left in the presidential election, according to preliminary opinion polls. The Broad Front initially supported Beatriz Sánchez, their former presidential candidate, to run again, but she declined and opted to run for the Constitutional Convention instead. With their main candidate out of the race, the Broad Front searched for alternatives, but most of their candidates lacked popularity or did not meet the minimum age requirement for presidential candidates.

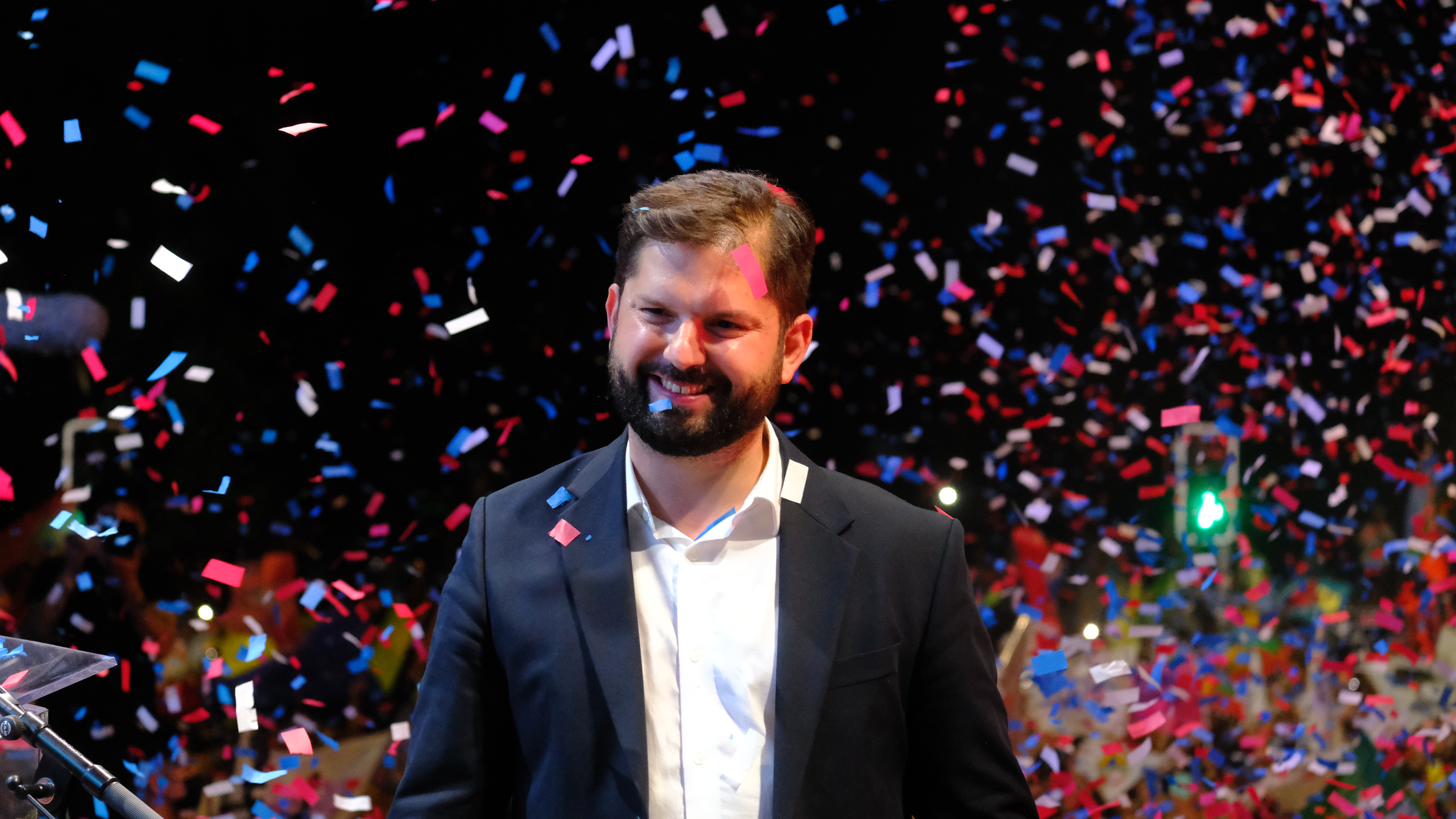
Boric in the celebrations after his victory in the 2021 presidential election

Eventually, Gabriel Boric, who was 35 years old at the time, emerged as an option to participate in a primary election against Jadue. However, Boric's party, Social Convergence, did not have the minimum number of members required to present a presidential candidate. In a remarkable turn of events, a campaign was quickly organized, allowing Boric to gather the necessary number of signatures just one day before the deadline.

Contrary to expectations, Boric won the Apruebo Dignidad primary election on 19 July 2021, receiving 1,059,060 votes (60.4%), while Jadue garnered 39.6%. Boric also emerged as the most voted candidate in the general primary, surpassing all candidates from the Chile Vamos coalition, whose primary was held simultaneously. Following his primary victory, Boric announced on Twitter that he would collaborate with Jadue during the general election to present a united front.

Initially, opinion polls indicated that Boric and Sebastián Sichel, the Chile Vamos candidate, were the frontrunners for the presidential election. However, Sichel's popularity declined in the following months, and he was overtaken in the polls by far-right candidate José Antonio Kast. In the first round of the election held on 21 November 2021, Boric obtained 25.82% of the vote, placing second behind Kast's 27.91%, which secured their spots in the second round. On 19 December 2021, Boric emerged victorious in the runoff with 55.85% of the vote. His inauguration took place on 11 March 2022.

== Presidency (2022–2026) ==
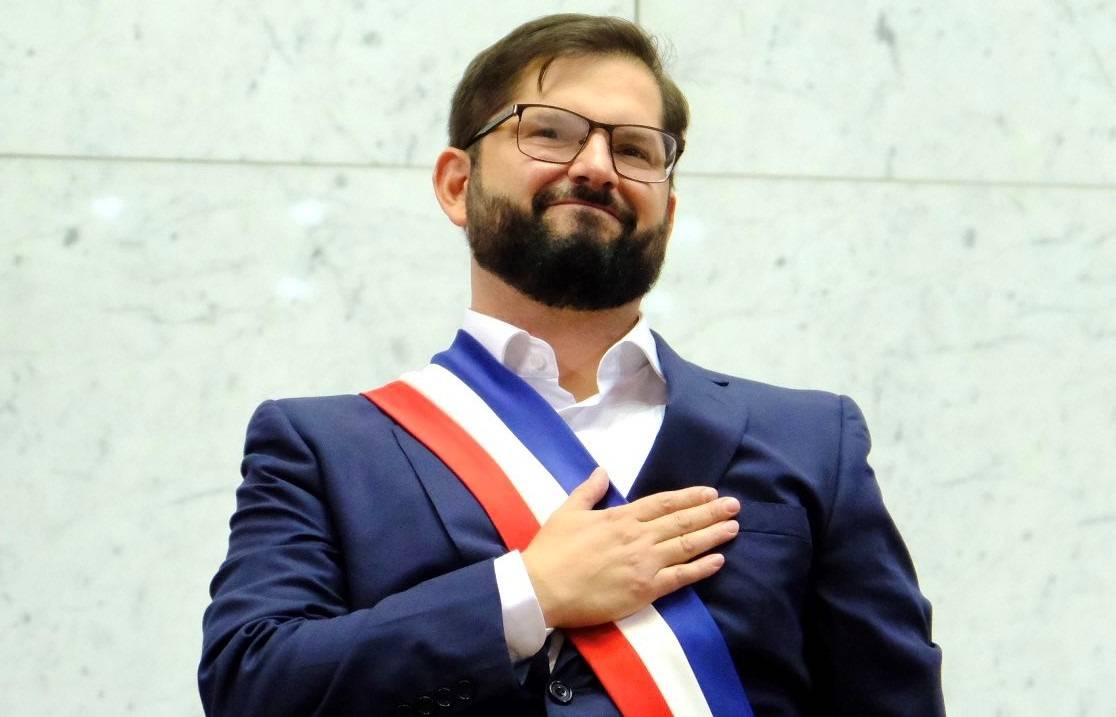
Gabriel Boric during his inauguration ceremony, on 11 March 2022

=== Cabinet ===
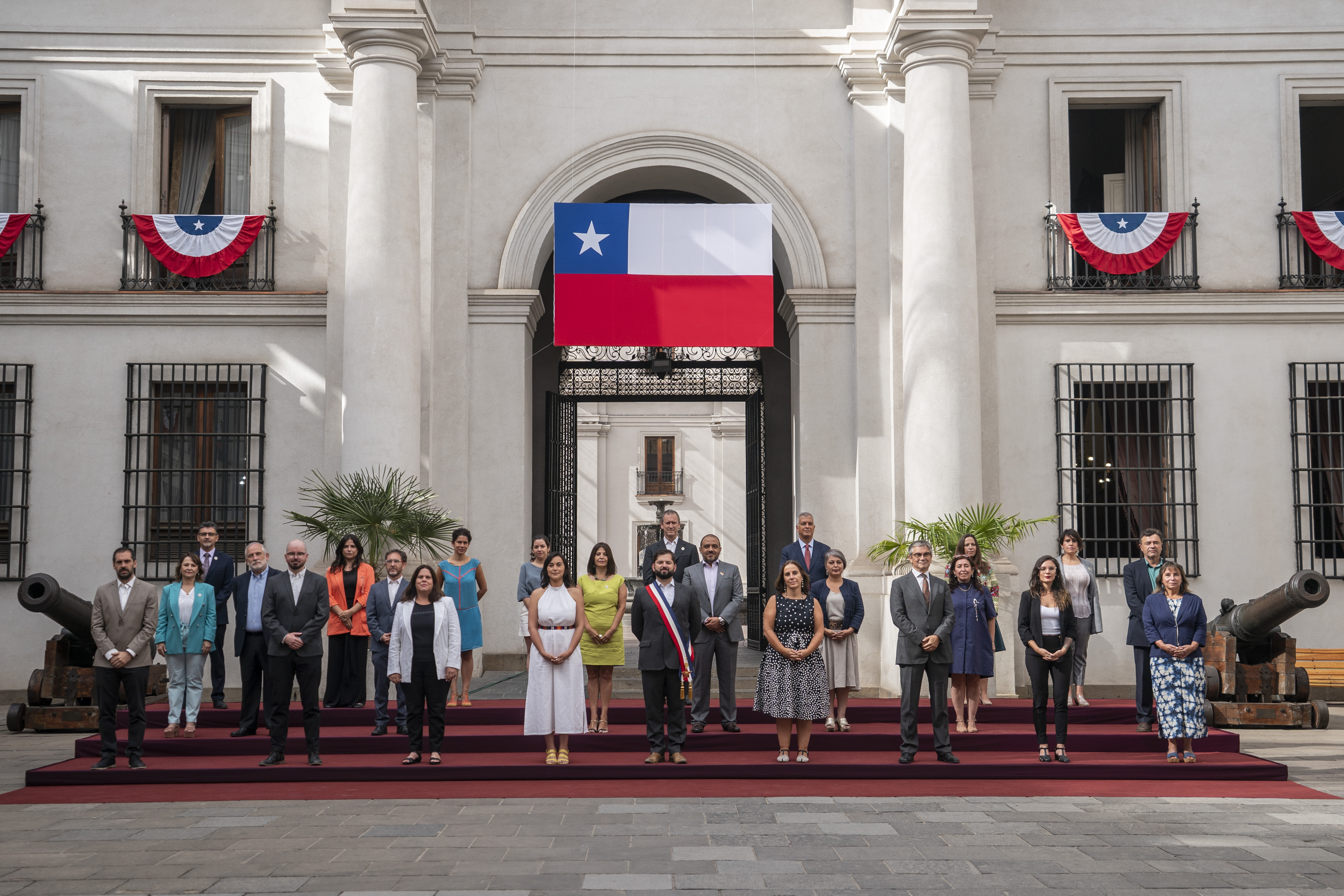
Official photograph of the first cabinet of the Boric government

In January 2022, Boric announced his cabinet, which included members from the Apruebo Dignidad and Democratic Socialism coalitions, as well as independents. Fourteen of the 24 ministers were women, making it the first cabinet in the Americas with a female majority. (Note: In Canada, the cabinet of Prime Minister Justin Trudeau has been described as "gender-balanced", where half of the positions are taken up by women. Excluding Trudeau, the current cabinet consists of 17 women and 17 men.) The cabinet also featured Chile's first openly LGBT ministers, Alexandra Benado and Marco Antonio Ávila, along with Maya Fernández, the granddaughter of former president Salvador Allende.

Boric also appointed three fellow former student leaders to his cabinet. Camila Vallejo, who became the government spokesperson, Giorgio Jackson, who assumed the role of secretary-general of the presidency, and Nicolás Grau, who became the Minister of Economy, Development, and Tourism.

Ricardo Ffrench-Davis, amidst speculation of being appointed as Minister of Finance, explained that, at the age of 85, he considered himself too old to fulfill the task but expressed his willingness to provide advice. When Mario Marcel was announced as the future finance minister in January 2022, the Santiago Stock Exchange reacted positively, with the IPSA rising by 2.35%.

In August 2023, amid low approval ratings, voter concerns over crime and inflation, and a corruption probe focused on graft accusations, Boric reorganized his Cabinet for the third time in one-and-a-half years.

The Boric Cabinet
Office	Name	Party	Term
President	Gabriel Boric	FA	11 March 2022–11 March 2026
Interior	Izkia Siches	Ind.	11 March 2022–6 September 2022
Carolina Tohá	PPD	6 September 2022–4 March 2025
Álvaro Elizalde	PS	4 March 2025–11 March 2026
Foreign Affairs	Antonia Urrejola	Ind.	11 March 2022–10 March 2023
Alberto van Klaveren	Ind.	10 March 2023–11 March 2026
Defense	Maya Fernández	PS	11 March 2022–10 March 2025
Adriana Delpiano	PPD	10 March 2025–11 March 2026
Finance	Mario Marcel	Ind.	11 March 2022–11 March 2026
Gen. Sec. of the Presidency	Giorgio Jackson	RD	11 March 2022–6 September 2022
Ana Lya Uriarte	PS	6 September 2022–19 April 2023
Álvaro Elizalde	PS	19 April 2023–4 March 2025
Macarena Lobos	Ind.	4 March 2025–11 March 2026
Gen. Sec. of Government	Camila Vallejo	PCCh	11 March 2022–23 December 2024
Aisén Etcheverry (act.)	Ind.	23 December 2024–8 July 2025
Camila Vallejo	PCCh	9 July 2025–11 March 2026
Economy, Development & Tourism	Nicolás Grau	FA	11 March 2022–21 August 2025
Álvaro García Hurtado	PPD	21 August 2025–
Social Development & Family	Jeannette Vega	PPD	11 March 2022–25 August 2022
Paula Poblete	RD	25 August 2022–6 September 2022
Giorgio Jackson	RD	6 September 2022–11 August 2023
Javiera Toro	FA	16 August 2023–11 March 2026
Education	Marco Antonio Ávila	RD	11 March 2022–15 August 2023
Nicolás Cataldo	PCCh	16 August 2023–11 March 2026
Justice & Human; Rights	Marcela Ríos	CS	11 March 2022–7 January 2023
Luis Cordero	Ind.	11 January 2023–17 October 2024
Jaime Gajardo Falcón	PCCh	17 October 2024–11 March 2026
Labor & Social Welfare	Jeannette Jara	PCCh	11 March 2022–7 April 2025
Giorgio Boccardo	FA	7 April 2025–11 March 2026
Public Works	Juan Carlos García	PL	11 March 2022–10 March 2023
Jessica López	PS	10 March 2023–11 March 2026
Health	María Begoña Yarza	Ind.	11 March 2022–6 September 2022
Ximena Aguilera	Ind.	6 September 2022–11 March 2026
Housing & Urbanism	Carlos Montes	PS	11 March 2022–11 March 2026
Agriculture	Esteban Valenzuela	FRVS	11 March 2022–11 March 2026
Mining	Marcela Hernando	PR	11 March 2022–16 August 2023
Aurora Williams	PR	16 August 2023–
Transport & Telecommunications	Juan Carlos Muñoz	Ind.	11 March 2022–11 March 2026
National Assets	Javiera Toro	COM	11 March 2022–16 August 2023
Marcela Sandoval	FA	16 August 2023–6 January 2025
Sebastián Vergara (act.)	PPD	6 January 2025–9 January 2025
Francisco Figueroa	FA	9 January 2025–11 March 2026
Energy	Claudio Huepe	CS	11 March 2022–6 September 2022
Diego Pardow	FA	6 September 2022–16 October 2025
Álvaro García Hurtado	PPD	16 October 2025–
Environment	Maisa Rojas	Ind.	11 March 2022–11 March 2026
Women & Gender; Equality	Antonia Orellana	FA	11 March 2022–11 March 2026
Culture & the Arts	Julieta Brodsky	CS	11 March 2022–10 March 2023
Jaime de Aguirre	Ind.	10 March 2023–15 August 2023
Carolina Arredondo	Ind.	16 August 2023–11 March 2026
Sports	Alexandra Benado	Ind.	11 March 2022–10 March 2023
Jaime Pizarro	Ind.	10 March 2023–11 March 2026
Science, Technology, Knowledge & Innovation	Flavio Salazar	PCCh	11 March 2022–6 September 2022
Silvia Díaz	PPD	6 September 2022–10 March 2023
Aisén Etcheverry	Ind.	10 March 2023–22 July 2025
Aldo Valle	Ind.	22 July 2025–11 March 2026
Public Security	Luis Cordero	Ind.	1 April 2025–11 March 2026

=== Violence against government officials ===
During the initial months of the Boric government, both the president and individuals associated with his administration have faced threats, violent crimes, and physical aggression. In mid-March, Minister of Interior and Public Security Izkia Siches encountered gunfire during a visit to Temucuicui and had to be evacuated for her safety. In April, President Boric himself was targeted in an attack by a man who tried to throw a stone at him. On the night of 13 May, one of Boric's bodyguards was kidnapped and shot in the arm by unidentified assailants. Additionally, on the same day, the residence of Minister of National Defense Maya Fernández was burglarized. The Chilean police have stated that these latter two incidents are unrelated.

=== Mapuche conflict ===
In May 2022, Boric made the decision to deploy troops to the southern part of the country due to escalating violence in the Mapuche conflict. According to the Argentine newspaper Clarín, this move caused Boric to lose support from the Communist Party. Previously, Boric had distanced himself from similar measures taken by his predecessor, Piñera. Prior to Boric's decision, Héctor Llaitul, the leader of one of the Mapuche militias, had called for "preparing forces and organizing armed resistance". In response to Llaitul's statement, Boric's government initially dismissed the idea of filing a formal lawsuit against him, stating that the state "does not persecute ideas." Instead, they planned to incorporate these statements into existing complaints rather than initiating new ones.

=== Vote on proposed constitution ===
In September 2022, the Constitutional Convention presented a draft constitution described as progressive. The drafting process spanned from 4 July 2021—during the administration of former President Sebastián Piñera—to 4 July 2022, four months into President Gabriel Boric's term. The proposed constitution was rejected in a national plebiscite, with 62% voting against and 38% in favor. Critics described the draft as excessively lengthy, overtly left-leaning, and overly radical.

=== Economy ===
When Boric assumed the presidency, Chile's inflation rate had reached its highest level in nearly 30 years. In April 2022, Boric announced a $3.7 billion economic recovery plan, which included a minimum wage hike to alleviate the impact of rising prices. Although year-over-year inflation briefly rose to a high of 14.1% in August 2022, representing the highest level in 28 years, it then decreased dramatically during Boric's leadership, dropping to 5.1% as of September 2023.

Boric's government reduced the statutory working week to 40 hours, though this reform will be phased in over 5 years. His government also secured free public healthcare for the poorest Chileans, raised the monthly minimum wage to around CLP$500,000, and passed a mining tax to support underfunded municipalities.

=== Foreign relations ===
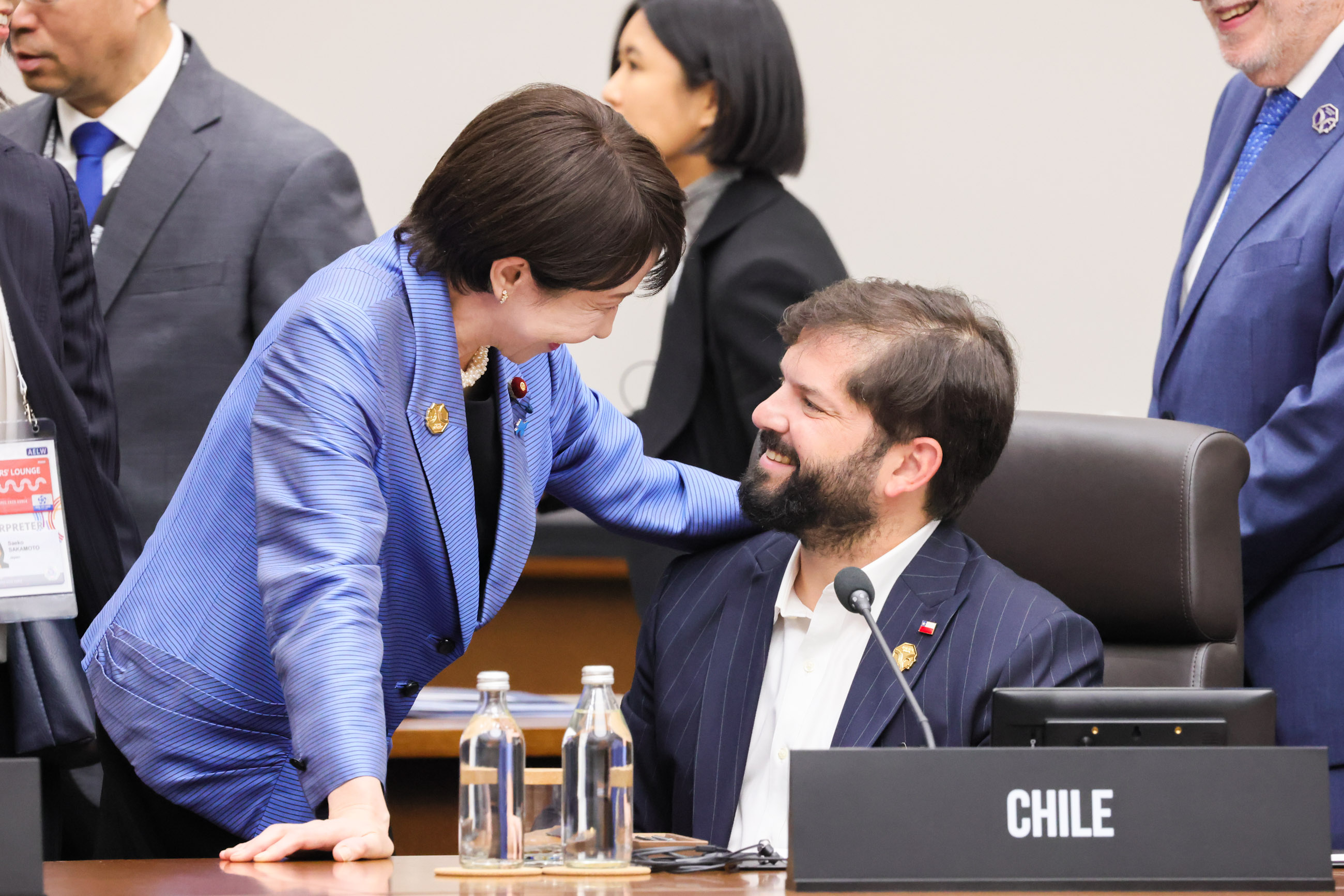
Gabriel Boric with Japanese prime minister Sanae Takaichi at the APEC South Korea 2025 summit on 1 November 2025

President Boric condemned the 2022 Russian invasion of Ukraine, stating in a tweet: "Russia has chosen war as a means of resolving conflicts. From Chile, we condemn the invasion of Ukraine, the violation of its sovereignty, and the illegitimate use of force. We stand in solidarity with the victims and will strive for peace through our humble efforts."

Boric's first international trip as president took place in April 2022, with a visit to Argentina, where he met with President Alberto Fernández. During the visit, Boric emphasized the importance of resolving outstanding territorial disputes and fostering a sense of fraternity between the two nations, irrespective of the administrations in power. He also reiterated Chile's support for Argentina's claim of sovereignty over the Falkland Islands.

On 15 September 2022, Boric declined to receive the credentials of Israeli Ambassador Gil Artzyeli in protest of child casualties during the 2022 Gaza–Israel clashes. The decision, made when Artzyeli had already arrived at Chile's presidential palace, triggered a diplomatic crisis between Chile and Israel. In response, the Jewish Community of Chile criticized Boric's actions, while Chilean Foreign Minister Antonia Urrejola apologized to Israel and rescheduled Artzyeli's credential ceremony for later that month. Boric, however, refrained from issuing a personal apology, stating that no individual in Chile would face persecution or intimidation for their beliefs unless they contravened the law.

=== Antarctic policy ===
In January 2025, President Gabriel Boric became the first head of state to visit the South Pole and the third head of government to do so.

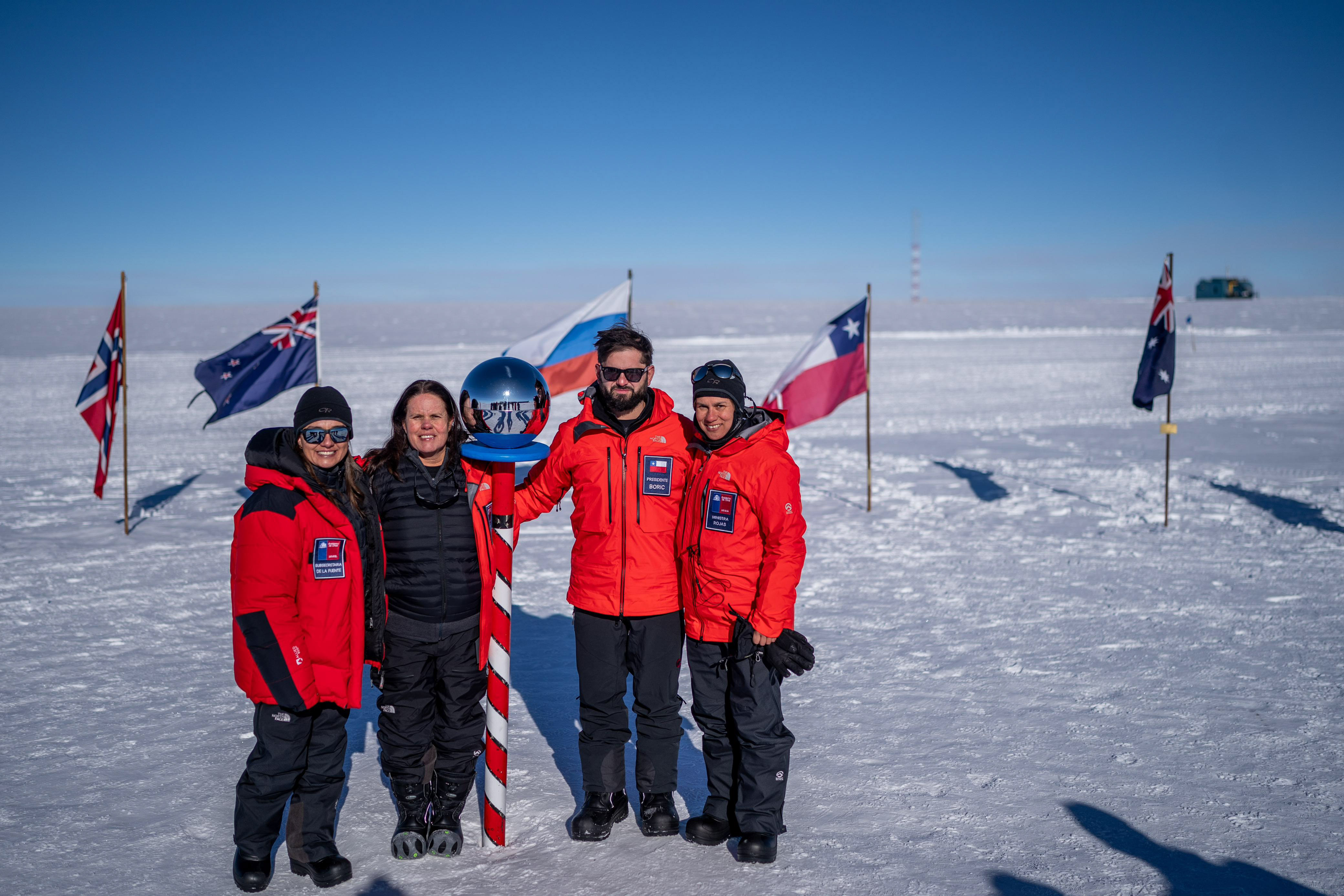
Chilean President Gabriel Boric and his entourage visiting the South Pole in 2025

=== Reparations related to the 2019–2020 protests ===
The government of Gabriel Boric has established grace pensions of up to 515,672 Chilean pesos for individuals who endured human rights violations during the 2019–2020 protests. Those who suffered such violations between 18 October 2019, and 30 June 2020, are eligible for these pensions. However, the National Institute of Human Rights (INDH) has raised concerns about the uncertainty regarding the compatibility of these pensions with disability pensions. Additionally, some members of Congress have expressed concerns that grace pensions have been granted to individuals whose trials have not yet concluded, thereby leaving the possibility that their injuries were caused by severe acts of violence unresolved.

=== Chile Abortion Rights Bill (2025) ===
In May 2025, the Chilean government introduced a bill to decriminalize abortion up to 14 weeks of pregnancy for any reason, fulfilling a campaign promise by President Gabriel Boric. The proposal, led by Minister of Women and Gender Equity Antonia Orellana, aims to expand reproductive rights and reduce unsafe abortions. Currently, abortion is only permitted under three circumstances: risk to the mother's life, non-viability of the fetus, or rape.

The bill faces strong opposition from conservative and religious groups, and legislative leaders have stated they will not prioritize its debate. As of June 2025, there is no scheduled date for a parliamentary vote, and the bill's future is uncertain due to limited support in Congress and the 2025 Chilean general election.

=== Approval ratings ===
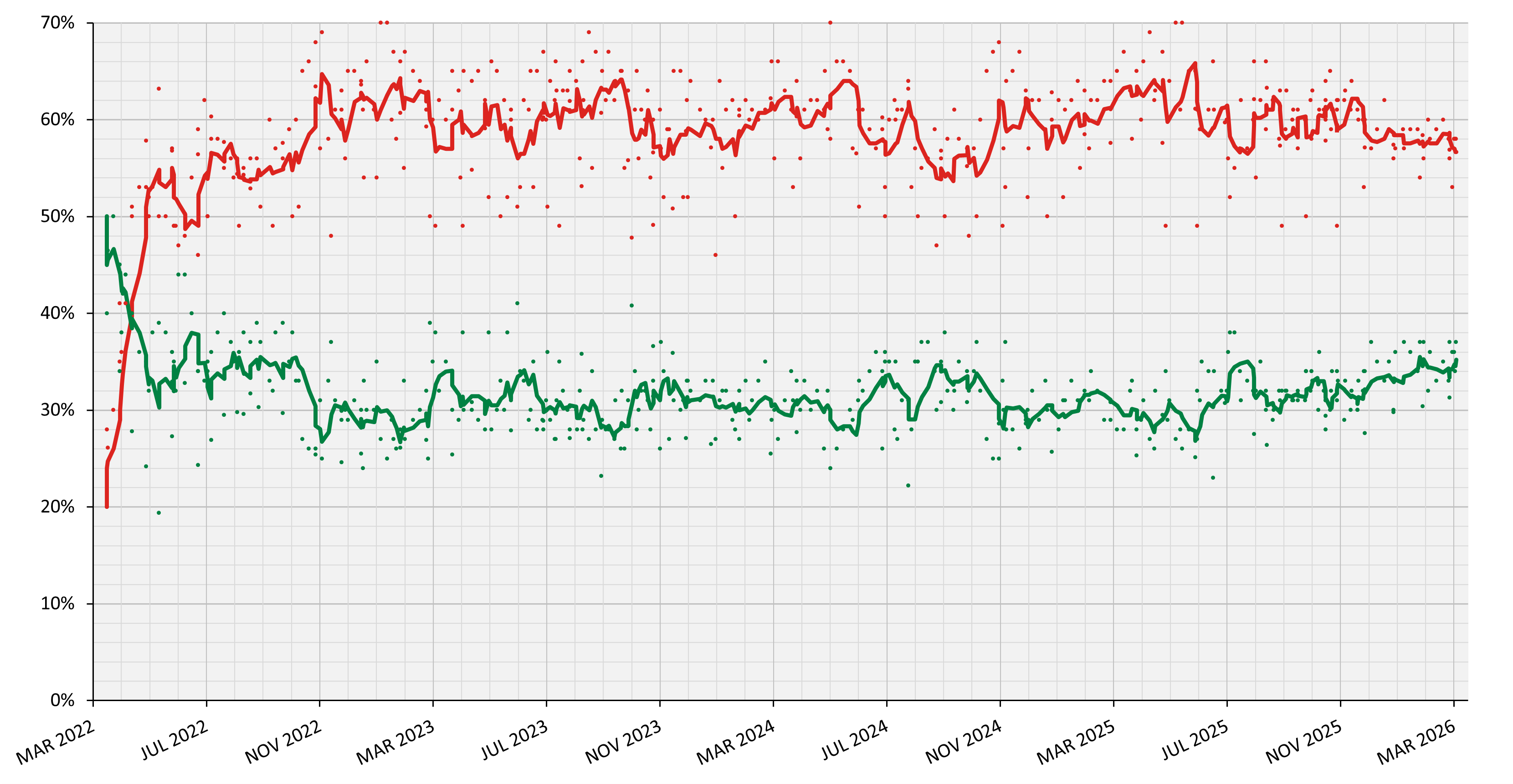

Boric took office with a 50% approval rating. After his first 100 days, his approval rating plummeted to 32.8%, marking the most significant decline in popularity for a Chilean President during their initial 100 days since 1990. By the end of 2022, his approval rating remained persistently low, hovering around 33%, while nearly six out of ten people expressed disapproval of Boric's performance. Factors such as increasing crime, economic challenges, and instability within his Cabinet contributed to the decline in public support. Consequently, Boric's approval rating dropped even further to 25% by January 2023. By May 2023, Boric's approval rating among the public was 28% and his disapproval rating was at 66%. Following a State of the Nation address in early June 2023, Boric's approval rating rose from 31% to 41%, improving across all population segments; due to the Democracia Viva case, it fell back to 28% in late June according to weekly polls by Cadem. In August 2023, Boric's approval rating hovered around 30%, with still a majority of disapproval.

By May 2025, Boric's approval rating declined to its lowest level of his presidency, falling to 27% approval.

=== Harassment allegations ===
On 26 November 2024, prosecutors announced a criminal case against Boric after a woman made allegations of sexual harassment that occurred in 2013 and 2014 when he was an intern in Punta Arenas. Boric denied the charges and said that he was being sent explicit messages by the complainant through email at the time.

== Political positions ==
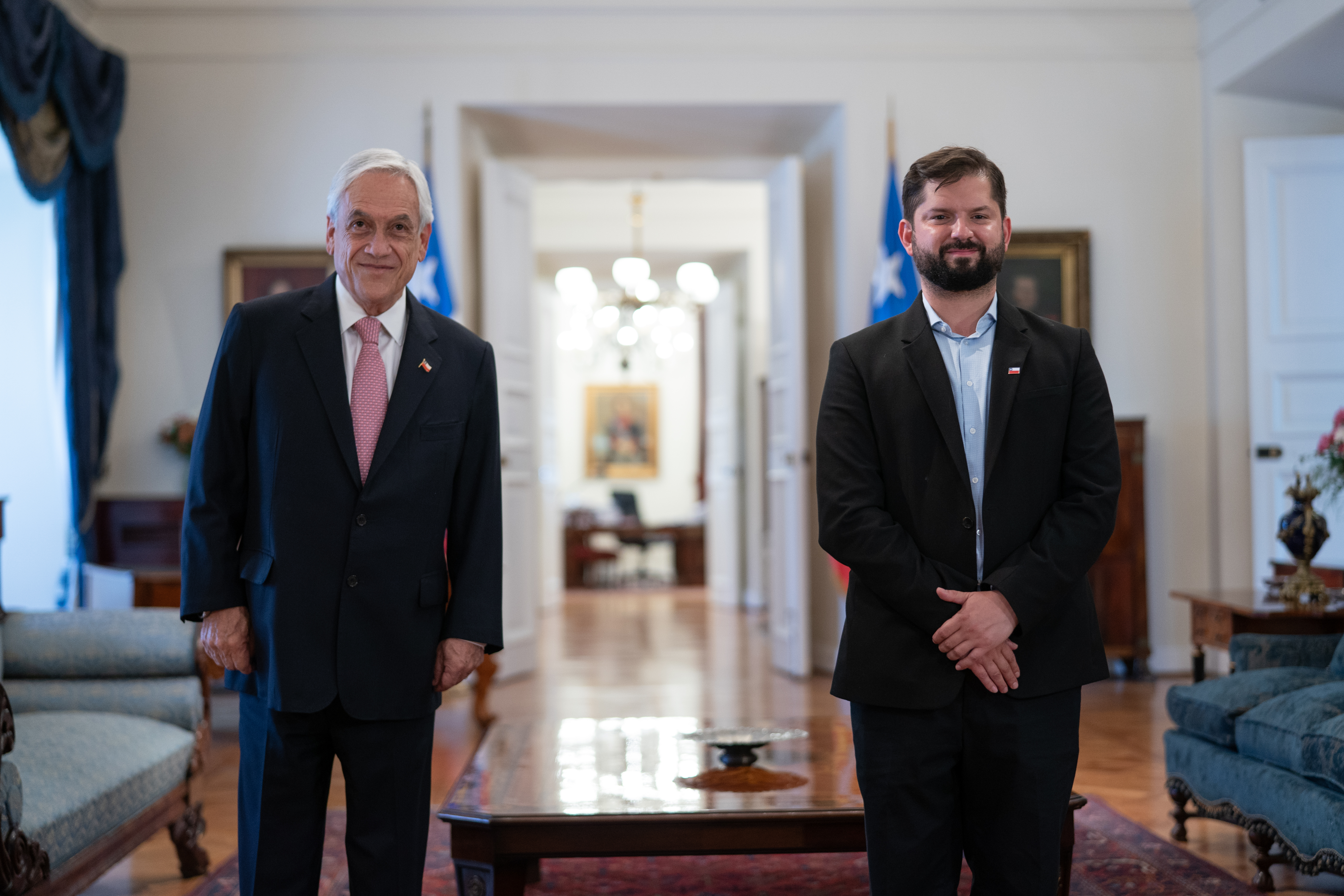
President Sebastián Piñera receives President-elect Boric in La Moneda Palace after his election, December 2021

Boric is a left-wing politician, who has been associated with various positions, including socialism and social democracy. But his advisor is Guillermo Tellier, President of the Communist Party. Important ministries such as the Interior, Government Spokesperson, and Education are in the hands of Communists. The Broad Front (FA) party was created imitating the Podemos party of Spain. In this regard, Boric has said, "I come from the Chilean libertarian socialist tradition, that is my ideological space of reference. I am a democrat, and I believe that democracy has to change and adapt and not petrify." He has expressed some "ideological proximity" with Álvaro García Linera, the former vice president of Bolivia.

Boric has been described by The Economist as "woke" and as part of the millennial left, "with a program focused on social justice, human rights, the environment and feminism". Both Cristián Warnken and Carlos Peña characterize Boric as a "postmodern leader". Peña credits Boric and the Broad Front for successfully uniting diverse demands that have emerged as Chilean society has modernized.

Boric has been critical of the social and economic model established in Chile during the dictatorship, arguing that it has continued even after the transition to democracy. During the 2021 election, he pledged to dismantle the country's neoliberal economic model, stating that, "if Chile was the cradle of neoliberalism, it will also be its grave." Boric has said "there were successes and things that didn't go well."

After the failure of the 2022 constitutional proposal, Boric adopted a more moderate position, which drew criticism from his initial supporters who felt he was trying to appease right-wing groups disconnected from the average Chilean. Throughout his presidential campaign, Boric supported the recognition of LGBT rights in Chile, advocating for legal recognition of non-binary identities and the expansion of gender identity laws.

In 2016, Boric defended a program to put 400 convicts in Valparaíso on probation due to overcrowding in Chilean prisons. He criticized what he saw as penal populism and opposed other deputies who were against probation measures. During a debate in the 2021 Apruebo Dignidad primaries, Boric once again criticized the shortcomings of penal populism in providing effective solutions.

Boric has been critical of pine and eucalyptus plantations, which he believes have contributed to drought among indigenous Mapuche communities in "Wallmapu." He pledged in 2021 to impose restrictions on large forestry companies during his presidency. In a May 2022 interview on Televisión Nacional de Chile, Boric reiterated his concerns about the forestry industry.

In a 2023 interview, Boric argued that a part of him wants to overthrow capitalism and expressed his belief that capitalism "is not the best way to solve our problems in society." He described his view on the feasibility of overthrowing capitalism, stating, "I don't think it can be overthrown without further ado if an alternative is not proposed that is viable and that is better for the people. One of the things that I have learned in office, not only in office, it is something obvious, but now it is as clear as crystal, is that you cannot re-found a country. All changes that last over time must be progressive and must be with strong majorities. And you have to build those strong majorities and those strong majorities are not easy to build."

=== Economic policy ===
Boric has criticized the Crédito con Aval del Estado (CAE), a student loan program created during Ricardo Lagos's government. Throughout his political career, Boric has consistently emphasized that education should be a right and not a profit-driven endeavor. He has pledged to forgive student loans and put an end to the program if elected as president. Additionally, Boric has advocated for reducing private involvement in critical sectors.

Concerning the healthcare system, Boric has called for the establishment of a universal publicly funded healthcare system, citing the British National Health Service (NHS) as an example. He has also advocated for the abolition of the AFP pension system, proposing a public autonomous entity to administer pension funds instead. Boric has further supported a law to implement a 40-hour working week and increase the minimum wage. Additionally, he has proposed the inclusion of workers' representatives and gender equality in the composition of boards of large companies.

Given that mining is Chile's largest industry, Boric has put forth proposals such as creating a state-owned company for lithium extraction, increasing the royalties paid by mining companies, and prioritizing environmental protection. Addressing the impact of climate change and promoting a green economy are key pillars of Boric's presidency.

On 8 March 2023, Gabriel Boric suffered a setback: by just one vote, the Chamber of Deputies refused to open a debate on the major tax reform he had promised during his presidential campaign to finance his social reforms. Following this setback, he had to wait a year before being able to present a similar text again. Presented to deputies in July 2022, it included a tax on large estates, a tax on the mining sector, and the reinforcement of the fight against fraud. This setback jeopardizes the pension reform project, which was intended to introduce a pay-as-you-go pension system, whereas the current system is privately funded, and to raise the value of the basic solidarity pension for elderly people who are not entitled to any pension at all.

=== Foreign policy ===
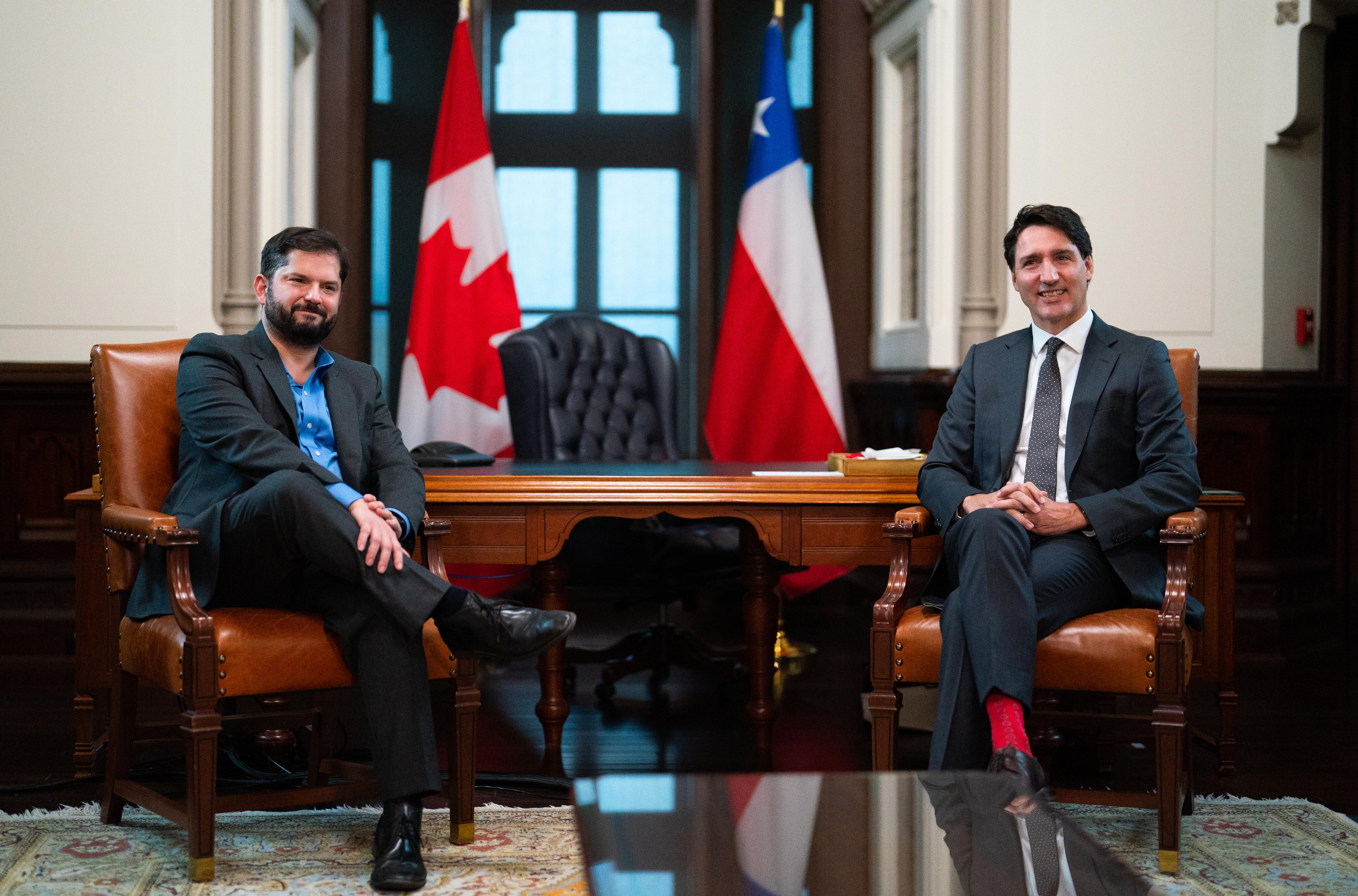
Boric with Prime Minister of Canada Justin Trudeau, June 2022

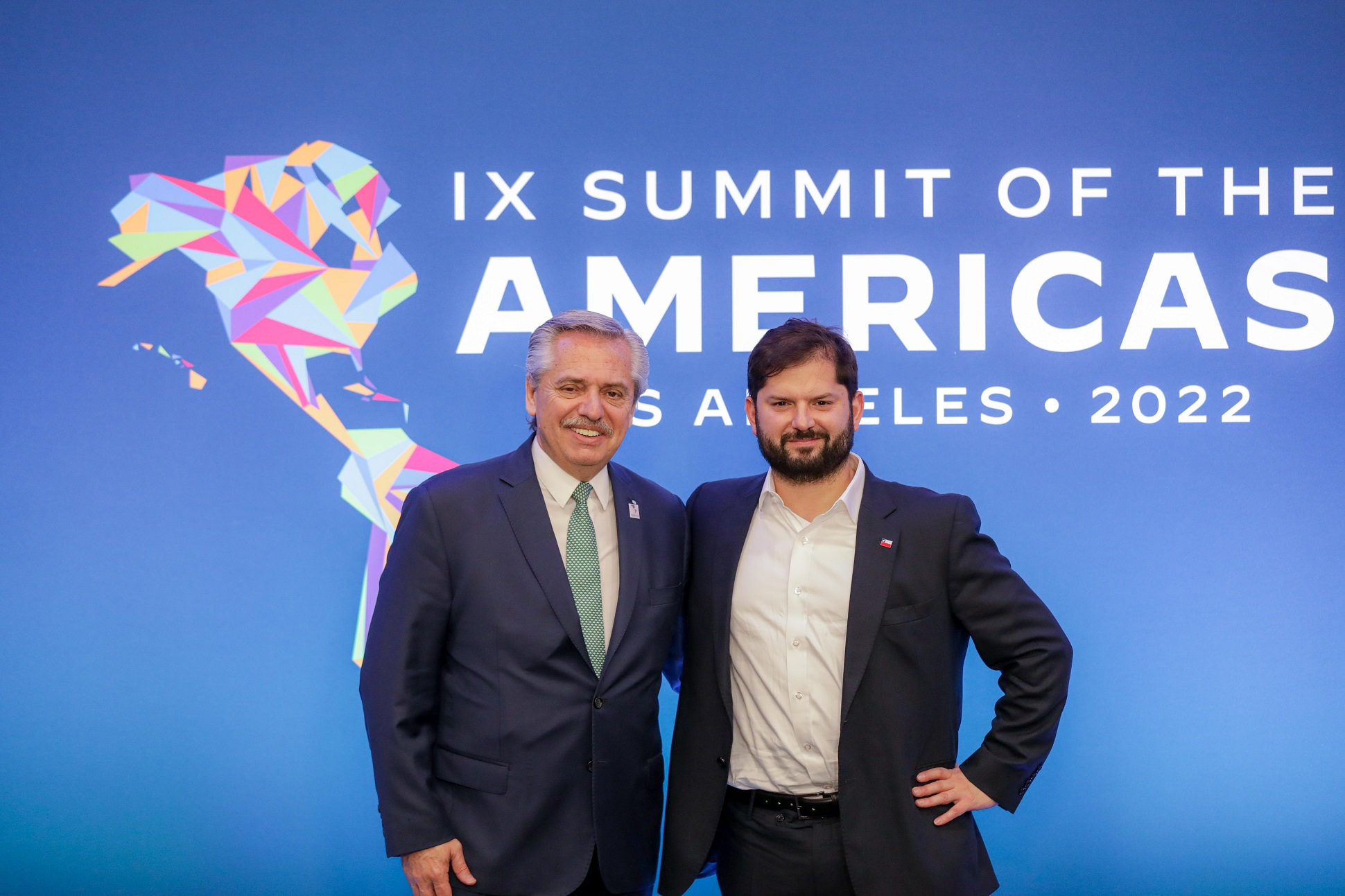
Boric with President of Argentina Alberto Fernández at the 9th Summit of the Americas, June 2022

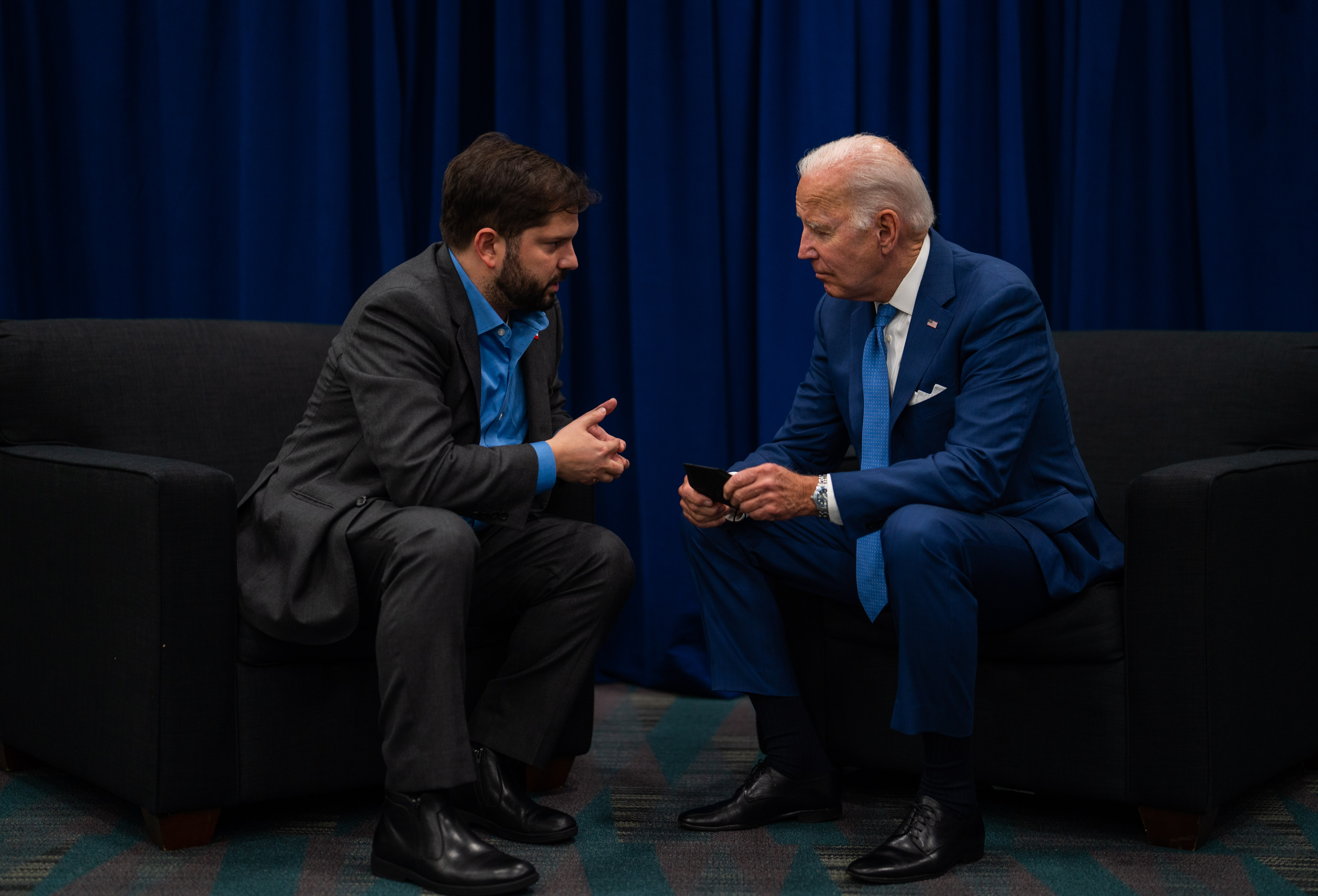
Boric with President of the United States Joe Biden, 2022

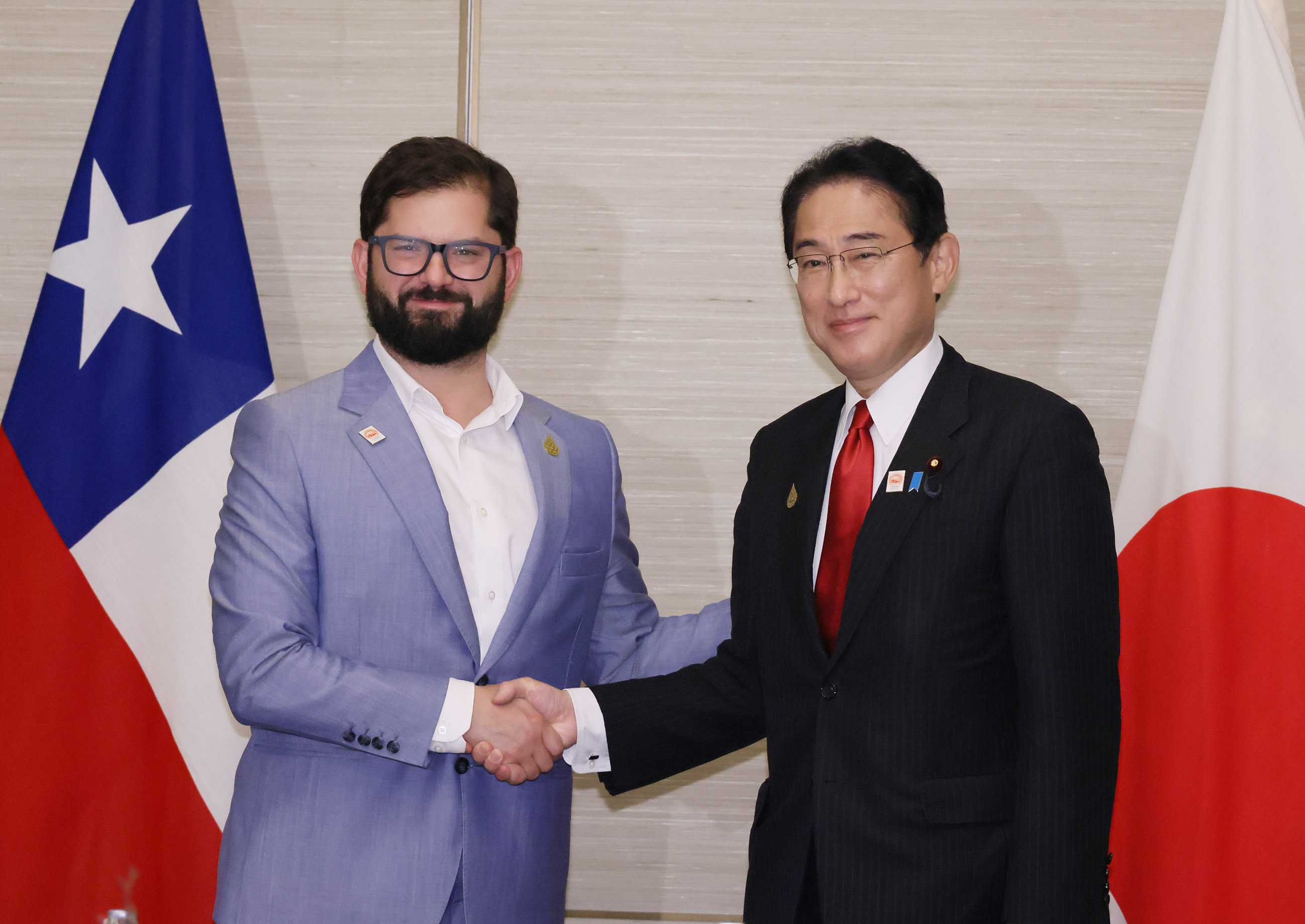
Boric with Prime Minister of Japan Fumio Kishida in Bangkok, November 2022

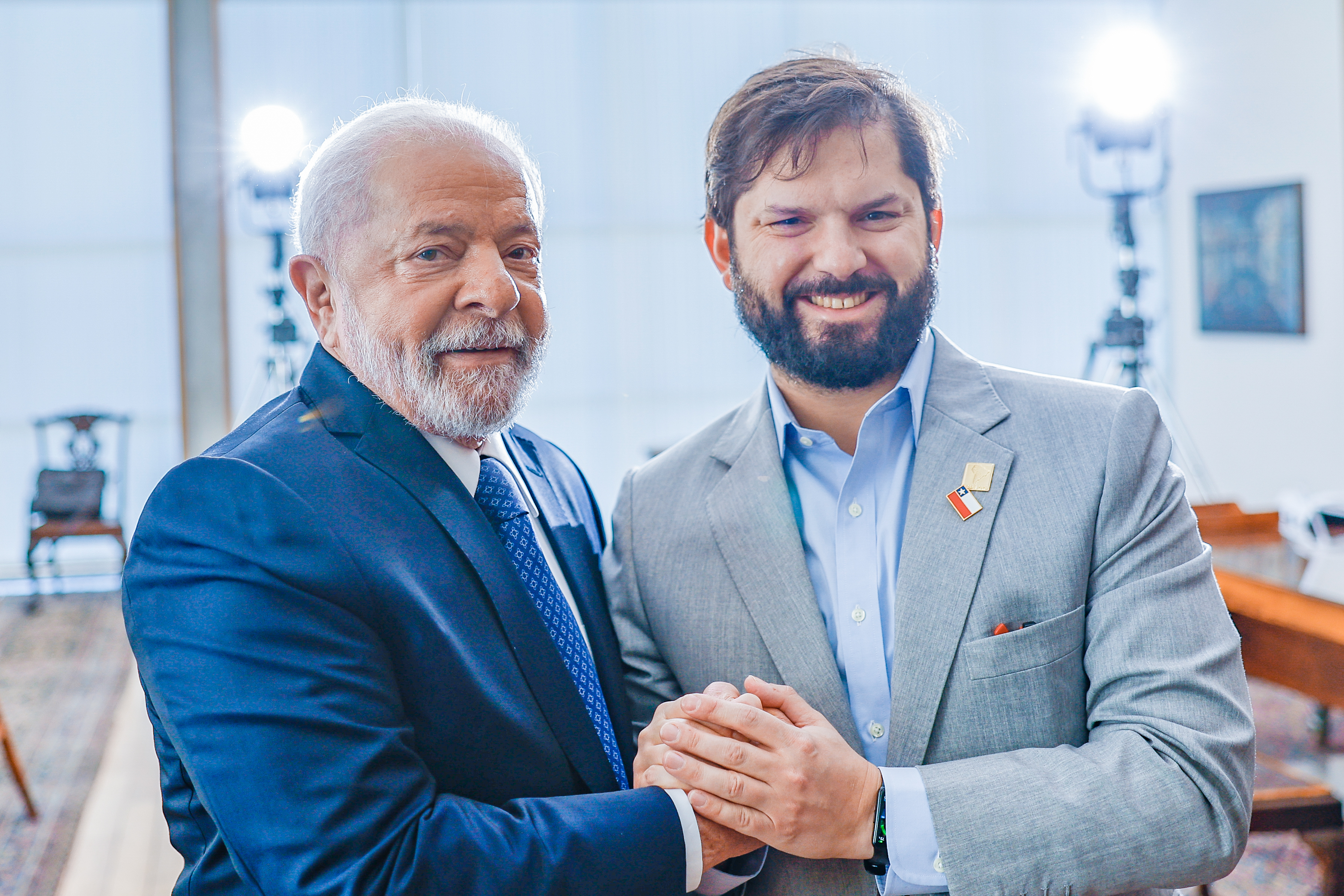
Boric with President of Brazil Luiz Inácio Lula da Silva in Brasília, May 2023

Boric stated that the democratic left should not uphold a double standard when it comes to human rights or employ the principle of self-determination to justify violations of human rights. He believes that, "just as the left must condemn the violation of human rights in Chile during the dictatorship and also today, the soft coups in Brazil, Honduras and Paraguay, the Israeli-occupied territories, or the interventionism of the United States, we must from the left with the same force condemn the permanent restriction of freedoms in Cuba, the repressive government of Ortega in Nicaragua, the dictatorship in China and the weakening of the basic conditions of democracy in Venezuela".

After assuming the presidency, Boric asserted that Venezuela serves as a failed example, with the six million Venezuelans in diaspora being a significant demonstration of this failure. During his presidential campaign in 2021, he labeled the Nicaraguan general election as fraudulent and called upon the Communist Party of Chile, one of his allies, to retract its initial statement supporting Daniel Ortega's government.

Boric criticized Brazilian President Jair Bolsonaro and Bolsonaro's stance regarding the crimes committed during Brazil's military dictatorship from 1964 to 1985. He referred to Bolsonaro as "a danger to the environment and humanity." In response, Bolsonaro showed a cold attitude towards Boric since his election in December 2021, announcing in January 2022 that he would not attend Boric's inauguration as president.

Regarding Bolivia, Boric expressed his intention to re-establish diplomatic relations between Chile and Bolivia, which were severed in 1978. He voiced support for Argentina's position on the Falkland Islands and extended sympathy towards the government of Alberto Fernández. Boric pledged to assist Argentina during its debt restructuring process and negotiations with the International Monetary Fund.

Boric stated that if Lula da Silva and Gustavo Petro were to win the presidential elections in their respective countries, an "interesting axis" could be formed. He strongly condemned the 2022 Russian invasion of Ukraine as an "unacceptable war of aggression." During his presidency, Chile supported United Nations resolutions demanding the immediate withdrawal of Russian troops from Ukraine and offered assistance to the Ukrainian government in clearing landmines left by Russian forces. Boric declined requests to supply Ukraine with weapons. The United States offered to replace any equipment donated by the Chilean Armed Forces to support the Ukrainian armed forces, an offer which Boric rejected.

With regard to the Israeli occupied territories, Boric has expressed support for the State of Palestine on multiple occasions. In 2019, after receiving a gift from the Jewish Community of Chile, he called for Israel to return the occupied Palestinian territories in a tweet. He described Israel as a "genocidal and murderous state" that violates international treaties, stressing the importance of defending international principles and human rights regardless of a country's power. Boric rejected accusations of antisemitism, asserting his opposition to all forms of discrimination. He considers the Israeli occupation of territories beyond the 1967 borders as a violation of international law. In October 2021, Boric and other deputies introduced a bill to prohibit the import of products originating from Israeli settlements, which are considered illegal by the international community. In October 2023, Boric stated that Israel's attacks in the Gaza war "primarily" affected unarmed civilians, and were a potential war crime.

== Personal life ==
Boric has been vocal about mental health issues and his personal struggles with obsessive–compulsive disorder, a condition he was diagnosed with as a child. In 2018, he took a leave of absence from Congress after being hospitalized due to his condition. The improvement of mental health services, particularly in the aftermath of the COVID-19 pandemic, was one of the central themes of his presidential campaign.

Raised in a devout Catholic family, with his mother actively involved in the Schoenstatt Apostolic Movement, Boric now identifies as agnostic. Between 2019 and 2023, he was in a relationship with anthropologist and sociologist Irina Karamanos. During Boric's presidential campaign, Karamanos expressed her belief that the role of the First Lady should be reevaluated to better suit modern times. Karamanos assumed the role of First Lady and worked to dissolve the institutional prerogatives of the role, which happened in December 2022. In November 2023, Boric and Karamanos announced the end of their relationship.

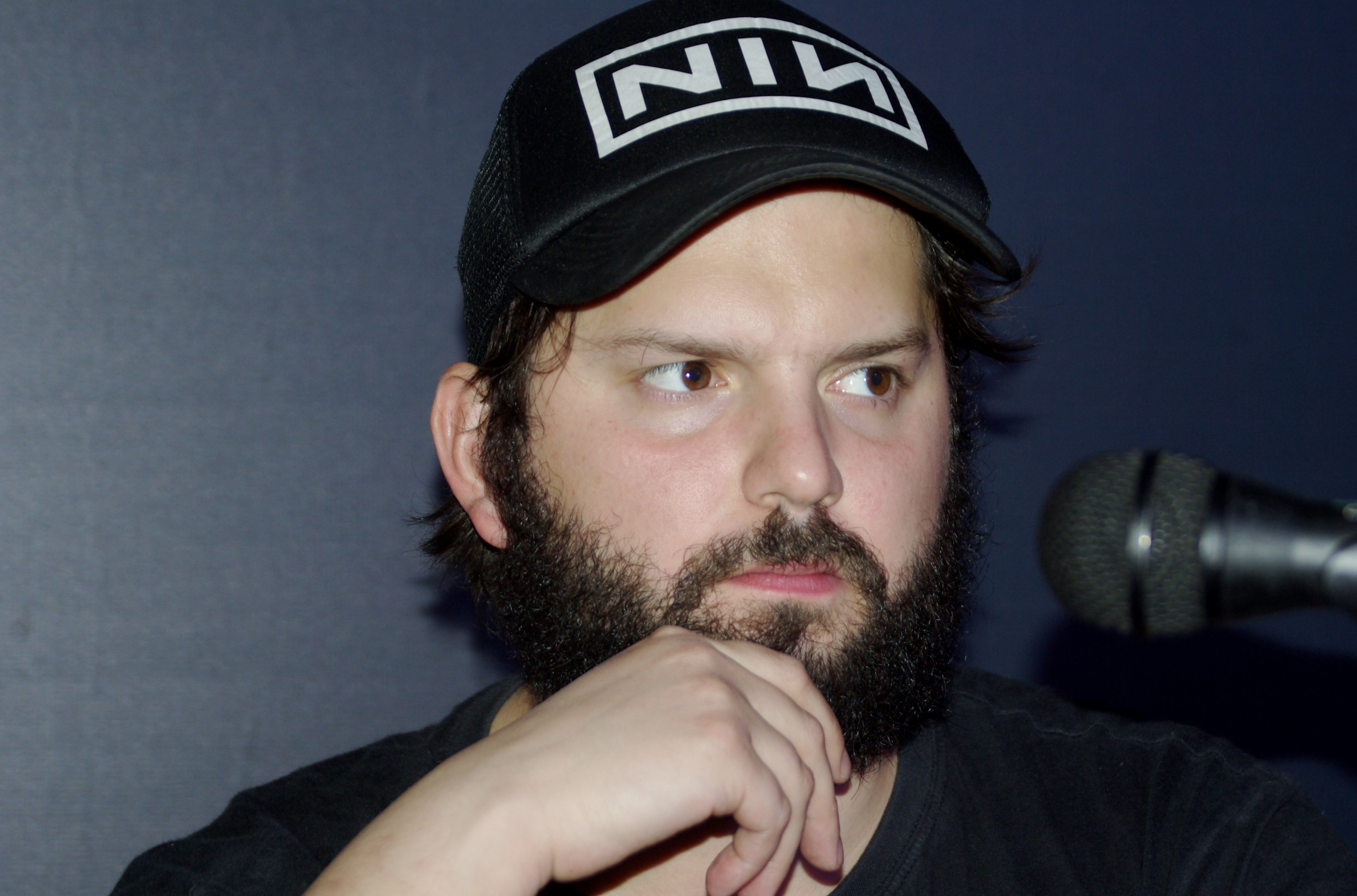
Boric wearing a Nine Inch Nails hat, 2015

Boric's love for rock and metal music gained widespread attention during his presidential campaign. He frequently shared posts on social media about some of his favorite bands, such as Deftones, Tool, Nine Inch Nails, and Rammstein. However, he has also mentioned enjoying musicians from other genres, such as Laura Pausini, Taylor Swift and Jeongyeon. Additionally, Boric is a supporter of the football team Universidad Católica and a Magic: the Gathering player.

Boric's appearance and style have faced scrutiny since his election as a deputy. As one of the youngest members of the Chamber of Deputies, he often wore casual attire, including jeans and t-shirts, during sessions of Congress. At one point, he even sported a mohawk hairstyle for several months. In 2014, controversy arose when Boric entered the Chamber without wearing a tie or formal jacket, prompting a public complaint from a right-wing deputy. During his presidential campaign, Boric adopted a more formal look, though he continued to abstain from wearing ties. Notably, he is also the first Latin American head of state to have visible tattoos. The designs on his arms and back represent his home region and include a map of the Magallanes Region, a lenga tree, and a lighthouse.

On 2 December 2024, Boric announced via Instagram that he and his partner, Paula Carrasco – a member of the Chilean women's national basketball team – were expecting their first child together. Carrasco has a child from a previous relationship. In February 2025, Boric revealed that they were expecting a daughter. Their daughter, Violeta Boric Carrasco, was born on 25 June 2025, at the Clinical Hospital of the University of Chile in Santiago. She is the first child born to a sitting Chilean president in 95 years.

== Honours ==
=== National honours ===
- Grand Master (2022) and Collar of the Order of Merit
- Grand Master (2022) and Collar of the Order of Bernardo O'Higgins

=== International honours ===
Ribbon	Distinction	Country	Date	Location	Notes	Reference
	Grand Order of King Tomislav	Croatia	12 December 2022	Santiago	Highest civil decoration in Croatia	
	Grand Collar of the Order of Boyacá	Colombia	9 January 2023	Santiago	Highest civil decoration in Colombia	
	Grand Collar of the Order of the Southern Cross	Brazil	7 August 2024	Santiago	Highest civil decoration in Brazil	

== Electoral history ==
=== 2013 parliamentary elections ===
2013 parliamentary elections for deputy of District 60 (Río Verde, Antártica, Laguna Blanca, Natales, Cabo de Hornos, Porvenir, Primavera, Punta Arenas, San Gregorio, Timaukel and Torres del Paine)

Candidate	List	Party	Votes	%	Result
Gabriel Boric Font	Independent (No list)	IND	15,417	26.18	Elected
Juan Enrique Morano Cornejo	New Majority	PDC	10,760	18.27	Elected
Domingo Rubilar Ruiz	New Majority	PPD	8,122	13.79	
Karim Bianchi Retamales	Independent (No list)	IND	7,999	13.59	
Sandra Amar Mancilla	Alianza	ILJ	6,581	11.18	
Gloria Vilicic Peña	Alianza	RN	6,541	11.11	
Rodrigo Utz Contreras	Independent (No list)	IND	2,619	4.45	
Margarita Novakovic Kalasich	Partido Regionalista de los Independientes	PRI	545	0.93	
Jorge Patricio Ivelic Suárez	Partido Regionalista de los Independientes	PRI	295	0.50	

=== 2017 parliamentary elections ===
2017 parliamentary elections for deputy of District 28 (Río Verde, Antártica, Laguna Blanca, Natales, Cabo de Hornos, Porvenir, Primavera, Punta Arenas, San Gregorio, Timaukel and Torres del Paine)

Candidate	List	Party	Votes	%	Results
Gabriel Boric Font	Broad Front	IND-PH	18,626	32.82	Elected
Sandra Amar Mancilla	Chile Vamos	IND-UDI	6,871	12.11	Elected
Nicolás Cogler Galindo	Chile Vamos	RN	4,810	8.47	
Juan José Arcos Srdanovic	Chile Vamos	PRI	4,220	7.43	
Karim Bianchi Retamales	The Force of the Majority	IND-PRSD	4,190	7.38	Elected
Vladimiro Mimica Cárcamo	The Force of the Majority	IND-PS	3,807	6.71	

=== 2021 presidential elections ===
Candidate	Party	First round		Second round	
Candidate	Party	Votes	%	Votes	%
Gabriel Boric Font	Apruebo Dignidad (CS)	1,815,024	25.82	4,620,890	55.87
José Antonio Kast	Christian Social Front (PLR)	1,961,779	27.91	3,650,088	44.13
Franco Parisi	Party of the People	900,064	12.81		
Sebastián Sichel	Chile Podemos Más	898,635	12.79		
Yasna Provoste	New Social Pact (PDC)	815,563	11.60		
Marco Enríquez-Ominami	Progressive Party	534,383	7.60		
Eduardo Artés	Patriotic Union (PC-AP)	102,897	1.46		
Total		7,028,345	100.00	8,270,978	100.00
Valid votes		7,028,345	98.79	8,270,978	98.89
Invalid/blank votes		85,973	1.21	92,932	1.11
Total votes		7,114,318	100.00	8,363,910	100.00
Registered voters/turnout		15,030,974	47.33	15,030,974	55.64
Source: Election Certification Court (final first round results), Servel (final second round results); Note: First round: Invalid votes: 55,480 (0.79%), blank votes: 30,493 (0.43%). Second round: Invalid votes: 68,802 (0.82%), blank votes: 24,130 (0.29%).

== See also ==
- Leaders of the 2011 Chilean protests
- List of current heads of state and government
- List of state leaders by age#Youngest serving state leaders
- List of heads of government that have visited the South Pole
- Education in Chile
- Notable AFS exchange students

== Explanatory notes ==
Civic offices
Preceded by Camila Vallejo	President of the University of Chile Student Federation; 2011–2012	Succeeded by Andrés Fielbaum
Chamber of Deputies of Chile
Preceded by Miodrag Marinović	Member of the Chamber of Deputies for Magallanes' 60th district 2014–2018	District suppressed
District established	Member of the Chamber of Deputies for Magallanes' 28th district 2018–2022	Succeeded by Javiera Morales
Party political offices
New political party	Social Convergence nominee for President of Chile; 2021	Most recent
New alliance	Apruebo Dignidad nominee for President of Chile; 2021	Most recent
Political offices
Preceded by Sebastián Piñera	President of Chile; 2022–2026	Succeeded by José Antonio Kast
