= Aldo Valle =

Chilean politician

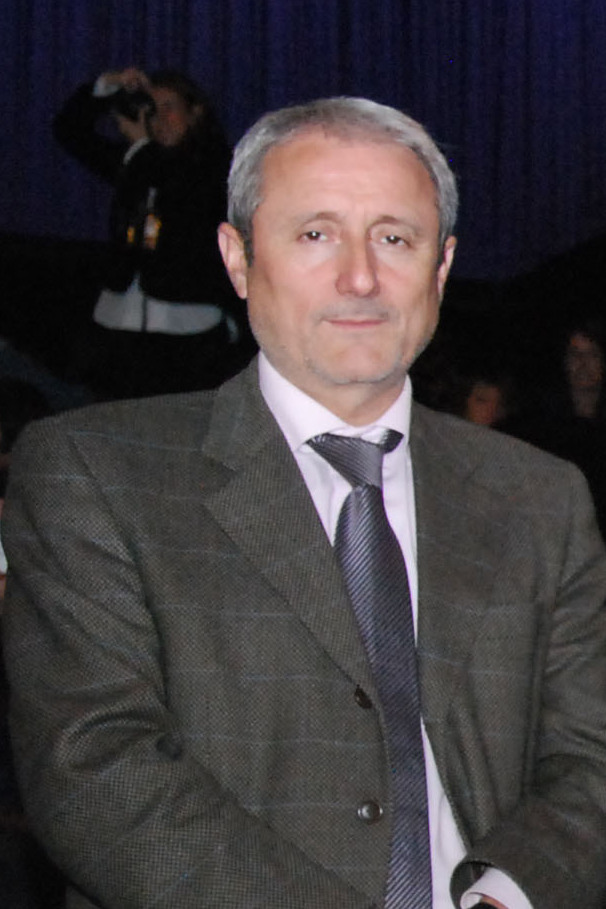

Ministry of Science, Technology, Knowledge and Innovation
- In office 25 July 2025 – 11 March 2026
- President: Gabriel Boric
- Preceded by: Aisén Etcheverry
- Succeeded by: Ximena Lincolao

Vice president of the Constitutional Council
- In office 7 June 2023 – 7 November 2023
- President: Beatriz Hevia

Member of the Constitutional Council
- In office 7 June 2023 – 7 November 2023
- Constituency: 6th Circumscription

Head of the University of Valparaíso
- In office 2 July 2008 – 2 July 2020
- Constituency: 6th Circumscription

Personal details
- Born: 12 November 1955 (age 70) Til-Til, Chile
- Party: Socialist Party (PS); Party for Democracy
- Education: University of Valparaíso; Autonomous University of Madrid
- Occupation: Scholar
- Profession: Lawyer

Aldo Salvador Valle Acevedo (born 12 November 1955) is a Chilean lawyer, politician and vice president of the Constitutional Council.

Valle completed his primary education in Quillota and his secondary studies at Liceo Eduardo de la Barra in Valparaíso. He studied law at the University of Valparaiso (UV) and was admitted to the bar on April 25, 1983.

In 1999, he earned a Master’s degree in Philosophy of Science, with a specialisation in Logic, from the same institution. He later obtained a PhD in Public Law and Legal Philosophy from the Autonomous University of Madrid.

== Biography ==
Valle was born on November 12, 1955, in Santiago, Chile. He is the son of Juan Andres Valle and Adelina Acevedo Cirano.

His academic career has been closely associated with the University of Valparaiso, where he served in several senior roles. Between 1994 and 2008, he was deputy director of the Journal of Social Sciences of the Faculty of Law and Social Sciences, and from 1996 to 1998, he served as Secretary General of the university. He was also a member of the board of the Chilean Society of Legal and Social Philosophy from 1994 to 2012. Valle has taught at both the University of Valparaiso and Diego Portales University and participated as an evaluator for Chilean higher education accreditation bodies.

He was the head of the University of Valparaíso from 2008 to 2020. During the period from 2015 to 2020, he also held the position of Vice President of the Council of Rectors of Chilean Universities.

== Politics and public service ==
In public life, Valle was previously affiliated with the Socialist Party of Chile and the Party for Democracy. He served as Head Legal Counsel of the Legal Division of the Undersecretariat for Fisheries and was part of Chilean delegations to several international conferences on fisheries governance in Rome, New York, Bogotá, and Lima during the mid-1990s.

In 2021, he ran as an independent candidate for Regional Governor of Valparaiso Region, receiving 20.06% of the valid votes.

In 2023, he was elected to the Constitutional Council representing the Valparaiso Region as an independent candidate supported by the Socialist Party, and he serves on the Commission on Economic, Social, Cultural, and Environmental Rights.

== Personal life ==
Valle is married to Vilma Correa Rojas.
