= Silvia Díaz =

Chilean politician (born 1987)

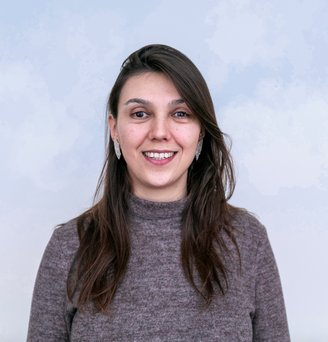

Minister of Science, Technology, Knowledge and Innovation
- In office 6 September 2022 – 10 March 2023
- President: Gabriel Boric
- Preceded by: Flavio Salazar
- Succeeded by: Aisén Etcheverry

Personal details
- Born: 1 January 1987 (age 39) Ovalle, Chile
- Party: Party for Democracy
- Education: Pontifical Catholic University of Chile (PhD)
- Occupation: Politician
- Profession: Chemical

Silvia Díaz Acosta (born 1987) is a Chilean politician who served as Minister of Science, Technology, Knowledge and Innovation appointed by President Gabriel Boric.

== Biography ==
She studied at the Colegio Santa María in Ovalle between the 3rd grade of elementary school until she graduated from high school.

She has a doctorate in Chemistry from the Pontifical Catholic University of Chile, graduated in 2015. Between 2018 and 2022 she served as deputy director and scientific director of the Fundación Encuentros del Futuro, entity in charge of «Congreso Futuro.»

== Political career ==
It is an independent close to the Party for Democracy (PPD).

She was appointed as Minister of Science, Technology, Knowledge and Innovation by President Gabriel Boric on September 6, 2022, replacing Flavio Salazar. She is the first woman to hold the position since the creation of the ministry in 2018.
