= Aisén Etcheverry =

Chilean politician

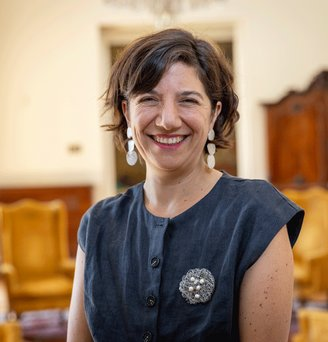

Ministry of Science, Technology, Knowledge and Innovation
- In office 16 August 2023 – 25 July 2025
- President: Gabriel Boric
- Preceded by: Silvia Díaz
- Succeeded by: Aldo Valle

Personal details
- Born: 24 March 1980 (age 46) Santiago, Chile
- Party: Democratic Revolution
- Education: University of Chile; University of San Francisco (MD)
- Occupation: Politician
- Profession: Lawyer

Aisén Amelia Etcheverry Escudero (born 24 March 1980) is a Chilean lawyer and politician, member of Democratic Revolution (RD). Since March 10, 2023, she has been serving as Minister of Science, Technology, Knowledge and Innovation under the government of Gabriel Boric. Previously she served as president of the National Council of Science, Technology, Knowledge and Innovation.

== Biography ==
Aisén Etcheverry is the daughter of Pedro Esteban Etcheverry Miranda and María Alejandra Escudero Justiniano. She studied at the Colegio Alianza Francesa in Santiago and later obtained her law degree from the University of Chile. After that, she pursued a master's degree in law from the University of San Francisco in the United States.

She worked in companies such as Oracle Corporation and Amazon where she formulated and implemented investment projects, sectorial regulation, human capital, and research and development.

She was director of the CORFO committee on digital transformation. In 2019 she took over as director of the national research and development agency. Later on, she was appointed as the head of the Interministerial Coordination division of the Ministry of General Secretary of the Presidency.
