= Matías Walker =

Chilean politician

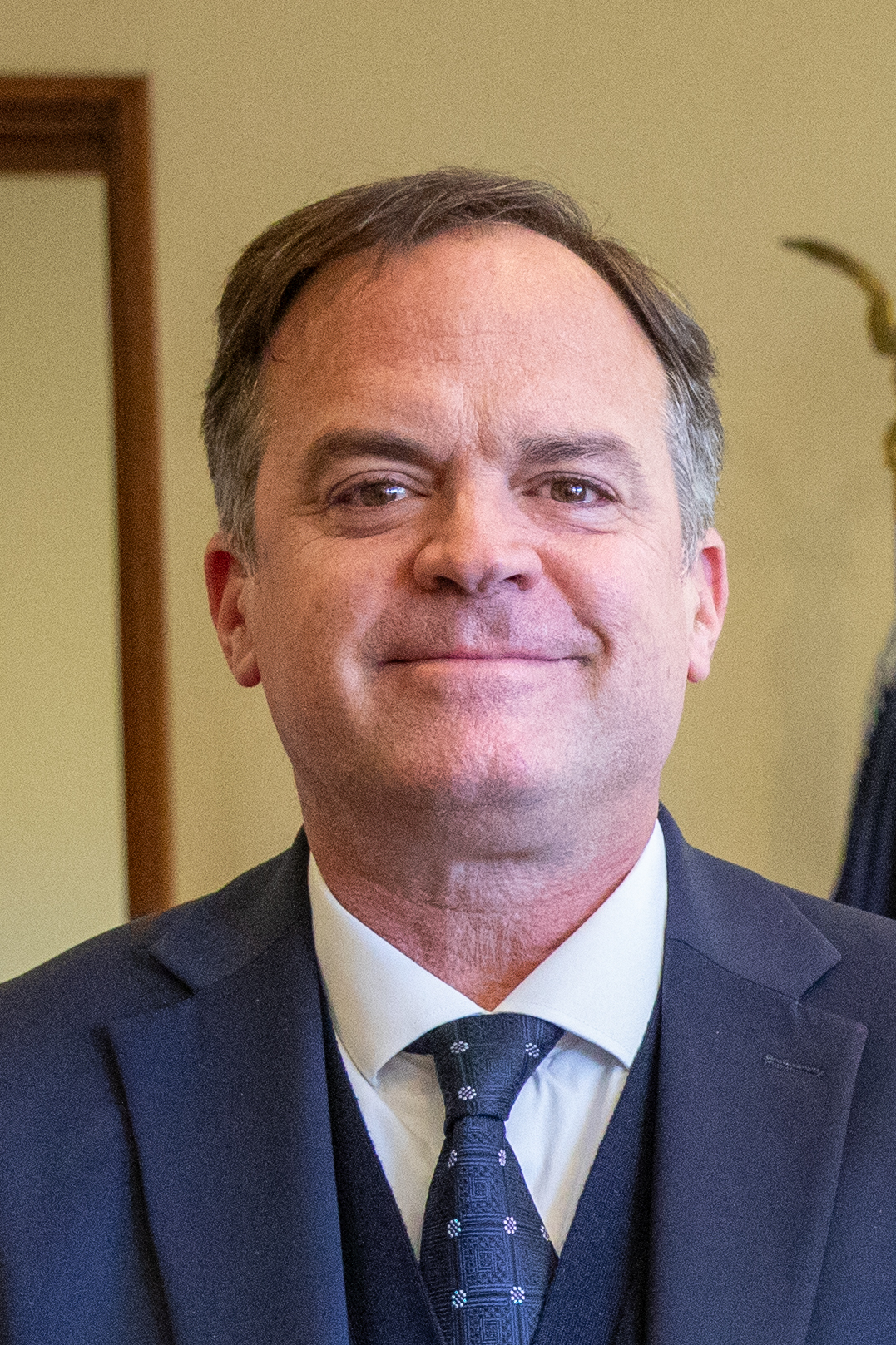

Member of the Senate
- Incumbent
- Assumed office 11 March 2022
- Preceded by: Jorge Pizarro
- Constituency: Coquimbo Region

Member of the Chamber of Deputies
- In office 11 March 2018 – 11 March 2022
- Preceded by: Creation of the district
- Constituency: District 5
- In office 11 March 2010 – 11 March 2018
- Preceded by: Patricio Walker
- Succeeded by: Office abolished
- Constituency: 8th District (Coquimbo, Ovalle and Río Hurtado)

Governor of the Cordillera Province
- In office 29 November 2000 – 28 December 2001
- President: Ricardo Lagos
- Preceded by: Teresa Montrone Plá
- Succeeded by: Macarena Carvallo Silva

Councilmen of Lo Barnechea
- In office 6 December 1996 – 6 December 2000

Personal details
- Born: 19 July 1973 (age 53) Santiago, Chile
- Party: Democrats (2022); Christian Democratic Party (1993−2022)
- Spouse: Manuela Fanjul
- Children: Two
- Parent(s): Ignacio Walker Concha; Isabel Prieto
- Education: Diego Portales University (LL.B); University for Development (LL.M)
- Occupation: Politician
- Profession: Lawyer

Matías Vicente Walker Prieto (born 19 July 1973) is a Chilean politician who currently serves as a member of the Chilean Senate.

On 27 October 2022, Walker resigned from the Christian Democratic Party after being a member for nearly 30 years. This stemmed from Walker's decision to support the Reject option in the 2022 Chilean national plebiscite, contrary to his party which decided to support the Approve option.

He has served as a municipal councillor and as a member of the. He was previously affiliated with the Christian Democratic Party of Chile (PDC) and later became a founding member and vice president of the Democrats party.

== Biography ==
Walker was born in Santiago on 19 July 1973, the son of Ignacio Walker and Isabel Margarita Prieto, who was the first Christian Democratic municipal councillor of Pirque. His grandfather was Horacio Walker Larraín and his great-grandfather Joaquín Walker Martínez.

He is the brother of Patricio Walker, Ignacio Walker, and Antonio Walker, who served as Minister of Agriculture during the administration of President Sebastián Piñera.

He is married to Manuela Fanjul and is the father of two children, Matías and Lucas.

== Education and professional career ==
Walker completed his primary and secondary education at Saint George’s College, graduating in 1992. He later studied law at the Universidad Diego Portales, graduating in 1999. In 2001, he obtained the academic degree of Licentiate in Legal and Social Sciences, with a thesis titled Protection of Minority Shareholders in the Law (La protección a los accionistas minoritarios en la ley). He qualified as a lawyer on 26 August 2002.

In 2005, he completed a postgraduate diploma on the New Criminal Procedure at the Universidad del Desarrollo.

Between 2001 and 2009, Walker was a member of the law firm Walker y Valdivia, practicing primarily in labor law and collective bargaining, as well as providing legal advice to small and medium-sized enterprises (SMEs).

From 2006 to 2009, he served as executive director of the San Esteban Mártir Educational Foundation, which provides education to more than 1,000 children and adolescents from low-income backgrounds.

== Political career ==
Walker joined the Christian Democratic Party of Chile in 1993. In 1996, he was elected as a municipal councillor (concejal) of the Municipality of Lo Barnechea, serving for the term 1996–2000.

From 2005 onward, he was a member of the National Board of the Christian Democratic Party, and between August and November 2017, he served as president of the party.

In the parliamentary elections of November 2017, Walker ran as a candidate for the Chamber of Deputies of Chile representing the Christian Democratic Party within the Convergencia Democrática coalition. He was elected deputy for the 5th District of the Coquimbo Region, obtaining 15,468 votes (6.67% of the valid votes).

In August 2021, Walker registered his candidacy for the Senate of Chile representing the Christian Democratic Party for the 5th Senatorial District, as part of the Nuevo Pacto Social coalition. In November 2021, he was elected senator with 26,186 votes, corresponding to 10.75% of the valid votes cast.

In late October 2022, Walker resigned from the Christian Democratic Party. On 2 November 2022, together with former members of the Christian Democratic Party, other parties of the former Concertación coalition, and the 50+UNE movement, he co-founded the Democrats party, becoming its first interim vice president.

== Honors ==
In February 2022, the Municipality of Vicuña awarded Walker the Joaquín Vicuña Larraín Prize in recognition of his contribution to community development, on the occasion of the municipality’s 201st anniversary.
