= Horacio Walker =

Chilean politician (1887–1974)

Horacio Walker Larraín
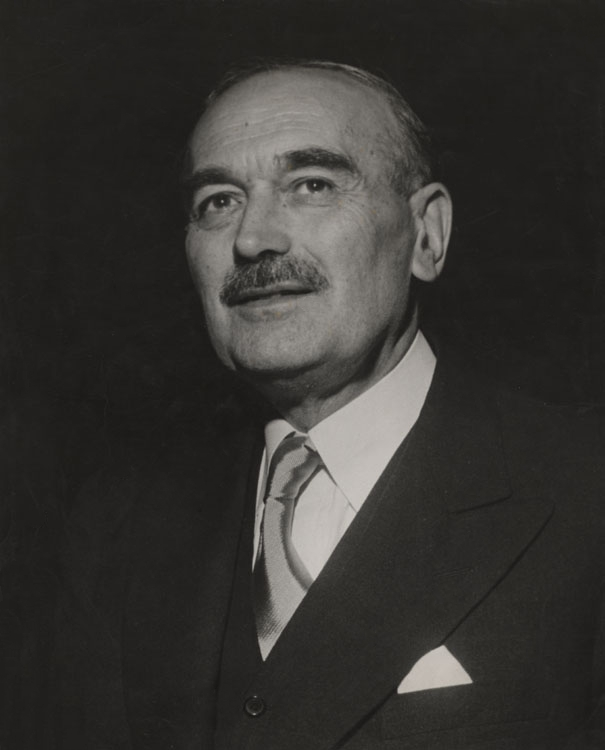

Ambassador of Chile to Peru
- In office 1965–1968
- Preceded by: Jorge Errázuriz
- Succeeded by: Sergio Larraín

Minister of Foreign Affairs
- In office February 20, 1950 – June 19, 1951
- Preceded by: Germán Riesco
- Succeeded by: Eduardo Yrarrázaval

Senator of the Republic of Chile Representing the 4th Provincial Group, Santiago
- In office May 15, 1933 – May 15, 1949

Minister of Justice
- In office September 3, 1931 – November 15, 1931
- Preceded by: Luis Gutiérrez
- Succeeded by: Luis Gutiérrez

Councilor of Ñuñoa
- In office 1907–1910

Personal details
- Born: July 12, 1887 Santiago, Chile
- Died: July 17, 1974 Santiago, Chile
- Party: PDC (1957–1974); PCSC (1949–1957); PCon (1908–1949)
- Awards: Legion of Honour; Order of the Cedar; Order of the Sun

Horacio Walker Larraín (Santiago, July 12, 1887 — July 17, 1974) was a Chilean politician who served as Chile's Foreign Affairs Minister from 1950 to 1951 for President Gabriel González Videla, and as Justice Minister (briefly in 1931) for President Juan Esteban Montero. A lawyer and member of the Christian Democratic Party, he also served as a Senator from 1933 to 1949, and as the ambassador to Peru (1965 to 1968).

== Early life ==
Walker was born in Santiago on July 12, 1887. His father was the jurist Joaquín Walker Martínez and his mother, Elisa Larraín Alcalde. He was the paternal grandfather of former chancellor and former senator Ignacio Walker, former senator Patricio Walker, senator Matías Walker and former minister Antonio Walker; and maternal grandfather of former senator Ignacio Pérez Walker. His studies were completed in Chile and the United States, graduating as a lawyer from George Washington University in 1907; while in 1910, he obtained his degree from the University of Chile. In said North American country he resided accompanying his father, who served as ambassador in that country.

In the professional field, he specialized in banks and wholesale trading houses and dedicated himself to teaching; He was a professor of public and private international law at the Pontifical Catholic University of Chile (PUC). Among other professional activities, he served as a member lawyer of the Court of Appeals of Santiago and the Supreme Court of Chile.

He married Teresa Concha Cazotte, with whom he had eight children.

== Political career ==
He began his political career at the age of twenty, as a councilor for the commune of Ñuñoa in Santiago, representing the Conservative Party (PCon), of which he would become president in different periods, such as in 1935 and 1951.

After the division of the Conservative Party in 1949, he joined the Social Christian Conservative Party (PCSC) and then the Christian Democratic Party (PDC), a group in which he would become vice president.

On September 2, 1931, he was appointed by the administration of the then vice president of the Republic and Minister of the Interior, Manuel Trucco Franzani; as Minister of Justice, serving until November 15 of that year. Two decades later, he was appointed as Minister of Foreign Affairs, serving in that capacity from February 27 to April 11, 1950, under the administration of the radical president Gabriel González Videla; He briefly resumed work on May 8, 1950.

As chancellor, he attended the Conference of Chancellors in Washington, D.C. and accompanied President González Videla on the international visits he made to Brazil and the United States.

He went to Congress for the first time in the parliamentary elections of 1932, being elected as senator representing the 4th "Provincial Group of Santiago", for the legislative period 1933–1941. In his parliamentary management he was a member of the Permanent Commission of the Constitution, Legislation, Justice and Regulation and was a replacement senator in the Permanent Commission of Foreign Relations and Trade and in the Labour and Social Welfare Commission.

For the parliamentary elections of 1941, he was reelected as senator for the period 1941–1949. He was a replacement senator on the Permanent Commission on Foreign Relations and Trade; in that of Labour and Social Security and in that of Finance and Budgets. Likewise, he once again joined the Permanent Commission on Constitution, Legislation and Justice, of which he was its president for the last four years. Also during this period, he was a member of the Permanent Commission on Foreign Relations and Trade.

In the government of Christian Democrat president Eduardo Frei Montalva, he was appointed political ambassador of Chile in Lima, Peru. He served between 1965 and 1968, this being one of his last public activities. As ambassador he was decorated as a Knight of the Legion of Honour of France; Grand Cross of the Order of the Sun of Peru; the Military Order of Christ in the Degree of Grand Cross of Portugal and Grand Cordon of the Order of the Cedar of Lebanon.

For more than forty years, he was in charge of the Legal Department of the Bank of London and South America. He was a member of the Santiago Bar Association and a member of the Club de la Unión.

He died in Santiago due to heart complications, on July 17, 1974, at the age of 87.

== See also ==
- Ignacio Walker
- Patricio Walker
- Matías Walker
- Antonio Walker
- Ignacio Pérez Walker
