= Francisco Javier Cuadra =

Chilean lawyer, academic, and politician

Minister Secretary General of Government
- In office 6 November 1984 – 11 July 1987
- President: Augusto Pinochet
- Preceded by: Alfonso Márquez de la Plata
- Succeeded by: Orlando Poblete

Personal details
- Born: Francisco Javier Cuadra Lizana; 23 June 1954 (age 72) Rancagua, Chile
- Party: Independent; National Renewal (1987–1995)
- Spouse: Francisca Montero Matta
- Education: Pontifical Catholic University
- Occupation: Lawyer, politician, academic

Francisco Javier Cuadra Lizana (born 23 June 1954) is a Chilean lawyer, academic, and politician. He was a minister under the military dictatorship of General Augusto Pinochet, dean of the Faculty of Law, and later rector of Diego Portales University.

== Biography ==
The son of Francisco Javier Cuadra Cornejo – lawyer of El Teniente mine – and María Cristina Lizana Alvear, Francisco Javier Cuadra spent his childhood and adolescence in his hometown of Rancagua with his brothers Cristián, Juan Pablo, Gonzalo, and José Miguel. There he studied at the Instituto O'Higgins and then went to university in Santiago: he first entered Adolfo Ibáñez University, where he took five semesters of Commercial Engineering, but after the coup of 1973 he changed to Law at the Pontifical Catholic University, where he received a degree in that discipline.

Recently graduated, he worked at the now-defunct Banco Continental, the only one to be the subject of an intervention by the Superintendency of Banks at the time. One of the delegates of this era was Pablo Piñera, but on 31 January 1983, he was dismissed after a conflict related to the manner in which negotiations with the entity's workers were handled.

== Public life ==
That same year Cuadra began to work in the Office of Special Affairs of Government – which was in charge of relations with the Holy See and which provided political analysis to Pinochet – led by Sergio Rillón. To the latter, Pinochet offered the Ministry General Secretariat of Government in November 1984, a post that he refused, but for which he recommended Cuadra, his second-in-command. He thus obtained his first important position in the military dictatorship, which he held from 1984 to 1987. He was then ambassador of Chile to the Holy See until the end of the regime (1987–1990).

After the return to democracy, he devoted himself mainly to the academic field and political analysis.

In an interview with the magazine Qué Pasa, in its 13 January 1995 issue, Cuadra said that there were "parliamentarians and other people who exercise public functions who use drugs." For this he was prosecuted under the Law on Security of the State, and was eventually sentenced to 540 days in prison. The incident led him to renounce National Renewal (RN), the party to which Andrés Allamand had brought him (and in doing so, he had appointed him director of the Liberty Institute).

In 2004 Cuadra was appointed rector of Diego Portales University, where he had worked sporadically as a teacher since 1983, and where two of his eight children, José Francisco and José Antonio, had studied. On 14 November 2005, he was forced to resign that position due to pressures exerted by certain sectors of Chilean society, especially by the student community of that house of studies. His departure came after some statements Cuadra made to Diario Siete, in which he claimed that under Pinochet, for whom he was minister, some people were detained - particularly Ricardo Lagos, after the 1986 attack on the general – to save them from falling into the hands of the feared Central Nacional de Informaciones (CNI, successor to the DINA).

The statements that detentions were made under dictatorship to prevent other repressive agencies from eliminating opponents of the regime meant that those representatives, the authors of such preventive detentions, were aware of the human rights violations that were taking place at that time. Hence, Judge Hugo Dolmestch, who was in charge of the investigation into the killings of four leftist militants committed by the CNI, ordered the interrogation of several of the members of Pinochet's cabinet, including Cuadra.

Cuadra was an advisor to Horacio Cartes, elected president of Paraguay in 2013, since he was a precandidate to lead the country for the Colorado Party.

== Cultural references ==
Cuadra was featured as the main character of the novels Baila hermosa Soledad (1991) by Jaime Hales and La patria (2012) by Marcelo Leonart.

Political offices
Preceded by Alfonso Márquez de la Plata	Minister Secretary General of Government; 1984–1987	Succeeded by Orlando Poblete
Diplomatic posts
Preceded by Héctor Riesle	Ambassador of Chile to the Holy See; 1987–1990	Succeeded by Sergio Ossa
Academic offices
Preceded by Manuel Montt Balmaceda	Rector of Diego Portales University; 2004–2005	Succeeded by Manuel Montt Balmaceda (interim)
