= Carlos Mladinic =

Chilean politician (born 1954)

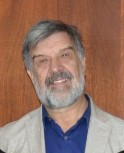

Minister General Secretariat of Government
- In office 29 June 1999 – 11 March 2000
- President: Eduardo Frei Ruíz-Tagle
- Preceded by: Jorge Arrate
- Succeeded by: Claudio Huepe

Minister of Agriculture
- In office 28 September 1996 – 22 June 1999
- President: Eduardo Frei Ruíz-Tagle
- Preceded by: Emiliano Ortega
- Succeeded by: Ángel Sartori

General Director of International Economic Relations
- In office 19 April 1995 – 27 September 1996
- President: Eduardo Frei Ruíz-Tagle
- Preceded by: Juan Salazar Sparks
- Succeeded by: Juan Gabriel Valdés

Undersecretary of Economics of Chile
- In office 11 March 1994 – 19 April 1995
- President: Eduardo Frei Ruíz-Tagle
- Preceded by: Álvaro Briones
- Succeeded by: Ángel Maulén

Personal details
- Born: 25 October 1954 (age 71) Illapel, Chile
- Party: Christian Democratic Party
- Spouse: Flor Draguicevic
- Children: Three
- Education: University of Chile (B.Sc)
- Occupation: Politician
- Profession: Economist

Carlos Rodrigo Mladinic Alonso (born 25 October 1954) is a Chilean politician who served as minister of State. He was a political panelist and columnist at Radio Cooperativa.

Mladinic graduated with a degree in business administration (ingeniería comercial) from the University of Chile in 1976 and subsequently completed postgraduate coursework in macroeconomics, monetary policy, fiscal policy, and economic demography.

Mladinic has served as president of the Foundation for the Development of Magallanes, member of the Chilean–Argentine Binational Commission for Southern Integration, president of the Technical Cooperation Service (SERCOTEC), chairman of the EuroChile Foundation, and member of the board of Fundación Chile.

He has also served on the boards of several corporations, including Empresa Eléctrica Pilmaiquén, the National Coal Company of Chile (ENACAR), Arauco, and Aguas Andinas, Chile's largest water utility.

== Biography ==
Mladinic attended the Salesian High School of Saint Joseph (Liceo Salesiano San José) in his hometown of Punta Arenas. While still a student, he joined the Christian Democratic Party (PDC) and later became the party's regional president in the Magallanes Region during the early 1980s.

During the military regime, he organized the first public protest against General Augusto Pinochet in Pinochet's presence, an event that became known as the Puntarenazo. As a result, he was sentenced to 541 days in prison.

That same year, he began his professional career at the consulting firm Gemines. After a brief period in the public sector, he continued his career in finance as regional manager of Banco Concepción (later Corpbanca). He later entered the healthcare sector as general manager of Clínica Imega in the Magallanes Province.

He is married to social worker Flor Draguicevic, with whom he has three children: Rodrigo, Vesna, and Nicolás.

== Political career ==
=== Early career ===
Mladinic began his public service career in 1977 as an external credit adviser at the Central Bank of Chile. In 1990, he was appointed regional director of the Production Development Corporation (CORFO) in the Magallanes Region. The following year, he moved to Santiago to join CORFO's Financial Restructuring Commission.

After the commission completed its work, CORFO's chief executive officer, Ernesto Tironi, was appointed ambassador to Geneva, Switzerland. Mladinic's performance and the absence of an obvious successor led to his appointment as chief executive officer. At the same time, he served as executive secretary of the Small and Medium-sized Enterprises Support Program. During his tenure, CORFO developed its so-called "second-tier lending" programs, designed to provide Chilean banks with long-term financing for domestic businesses, as well as the Technological Innovation Fund (FONTEC).

In 1993, he joined Juan Villarzú in preparing the government program of presidential candidate Eduardo Frei Ruiz-Tagle, chairing its economic policy commission.

=== Minister under Frei Ruiz-Tagle ===
In March 1994, Mladinic became Undersecretary of Economy under Economy Minister Álvaro García Hurtado. One year later, President Frei appointed him secretary of the Interministerial Committee on International Economic Negotiations and Director General of International Economic Relations (DIRECON) at the Ministry of Foreign Affairs, while José Miguel Insulza served as foreign minister.

In September 1996, he was appointed Minister of Agriculture. In office, he was responsible for managing relations with agricultural producers who had strongly opposed Chile's association agreements with Mercosur and Canada, agreements that had been negotiated during his tenure at DIRECON.

During Frei's final cabinet reshuffle in mid-1999, Mladinic was appointed Minister Secretary-General of Government, while Edmundo Pérez Yoma became Minister of National Defense and Insulza was transferred to the Ministry General Secretariat of the Presidency.

=== Lagos and Bachelet administrations ===
In 2001, Mladinic sought election to the Chamber of Deputies from Magallanes Province, but was defeated by his coalition running mate, Socialist candidate Pedro Muñoz Aburto.

After a brief return to the private sector, he re-entered public service during the administration of President Ricardo Lagos. He first served as a member of the board of BancoEstado before being appointed chairman of the State-Owned Enterprises System (SEP) in 2002, and chairman of the board of Televisión Nacional de Chile (TVN) in 2004.

In 2007, President Michelle Bachelet appointed him manager of the Pro Inversión program at the Ministry of Finance. During the final year of Bachelet's administration, he returned to La Moneda Palace as chief of staff to the Minister of the Interior, serving until March 2010.

In April 2010, while serving as vice chairman of the board of the Santiago Metro, Mladinic was recruited by José Miguel Insulza, then Secretary General of the Organization of American States, to work at the organization's headquarters in Washington, D.C., where he served as secretary of the Inter-American Committee on Ports.
