= María Emilia Undurraga =

Chilean journalist and politician

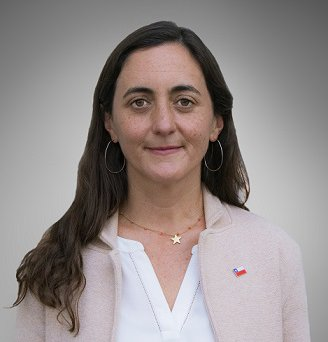
- Official portrait (2018)

Minister of Agriculture
- In office 6 January 2021 – 11 March 2022
- President: Sebastián Piñera
- Preceded by: Antonio Walker
- Succeeded by: Esteban Valenzuela

Personal details
- Born: 1975 (age 50–51) Santiago, Chile
- Party: Evópoli
- Spouse: Cristián Matetic
- Children: Four
- Education: Pontifical Catholic University of Chile (BA); Duke University (MA)
- Occupation: Politician
- Profession: Sociology, Agronomist

María Emilia Undurraga Marimón (born 1975) is a Chilean politician, sociologist and agronomist. She has served as minister of agriculture in the government of Chilean President Sebastián Piñera.

== Family and education ==
She is one of seven children of Pío Alfonso Franco Undurraga Mackenna and Rebeca de la Asunción Amalia Marimón Cousiño. She is married to businessman Cristián Matetic, with whom she has four children. She is a member of the political party Political Evolution (Evópoli).

She completed her higher education in agricultural engineering with a specialization in agricultural economics at the Pontifical Catholic University of Chile. She later obtained a master's degree in sociology from the same institution and a master's degree in international development policy from Duke University in the United States.

== Professional career ==
She lived and worked in the Valparaíso Region for more than eight years. Later, during the first administration of Sebastián Piñera (2011–2014), she worked at the Institute for Agricultural Development (INDAP), where she oversaw territorial programs serving more than 100,000 farmers across Chile through technical and investment support. In that role, she led the drafting of the National Rural Development Policy.

She represented the Ministry of Agriculture in negotiations with indigenous peoples regarding the decree regulating indigenous consultation, which operationalizes Convention No. 169 of the International Labour Organization (ILO). She also participated as a representative of Chile in international cooperation missions to Peru and Costa Rica. She served as Chile’s delegate to the Organisation for Economic Co-operation and Development (OECD) on rural territorial policies.

Until March 2018, she was an associate researcher and part-time professor at the Faculty of Agronomy and Forest Engineering of the Pontifical Catholic University of Chile, participating in various projects, including a “Strategic Territorial Hub” funded by FIA.

From August 2018 to January 2021, she served as National Director of the Office of Agricultural Studies and Policies (ODEPA). She was the first director appointed through Chile’s Senior Public Management System (ADP).

On 6 January 2021, President Sebastián Piñera carried out a cabinet reshuffle, removing Antonio Walker as Minister of Agriculture and appointing Undurraga to the position, becoming the second woman to hold the office after Marigen Hornkohl in 2008. She remained in office until the end of the administration in March 2022. Thereafter, she returned to university teaching.
