= Teodoro Ribera =

Chilean politician

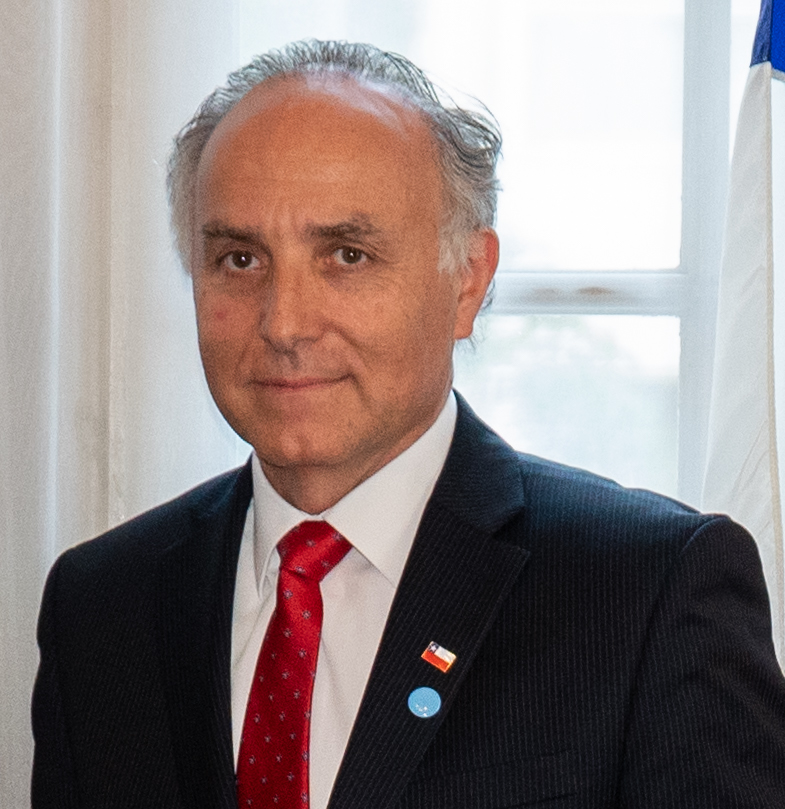

Minister of Foreign Affairs of Chile
- In office 13 June 2019 – 28 July 2020
- President: Sebastián Piñera
- Preceded by: Roberto Ampuero
- Succeeded by: Andrés Allamand

Head of the Autonomous University
- In office 1998 – 29 July 2011
- Preceded by: Office established
- Succeeded by: Ernesto Schiefelbein
- In office 29 July 2015 – 1 August 2019
- Preceded by: Ernesto Schiefelbein
- Succeeded by: José Antonio Galilea

Minister of Justice
- In office 18 July 2011 – 17 December 2012
- President: Sebastián Piñera
- Preceded by: Felipe Bulnes
- Succeeded by: Patricia Pérez Goldberg

Member of the Chamber of Deputies
- In office 11 March 1990 – 11 March 1998
- Preceded by: District created
- Succeeded by: Eduardo Díaz del Río
- Constituency: 51st district

Personal details
- Born: 25 May 1958 (age 68) Temuco, Chile
- Party: National Renewal
- Spouse: María Loreto Concha Valderrama
- Children: Four
- Education: University of Chile
- Occupation: Politician
- Profession: Lawyer

Teodoro Javier Ribera Neumann (born 25 May 1958) is a National Renewal politician and the former Minister of Foreign Affairs of Chile.

He was the Minister of Justice from 2011 to 2012, and head of the Autonomous University of Chile from 1998 to 2011 and 2015 to 2019.

== Early life and family ==
He was born in Temuco on 25 May 1958. He is the son of Teodoro Ribera Beneit and Edith Neumann Rodríguez.

He is married to María Loreto Concha Valderrama and is the father of four children.

== Education and academic career ==
He completed his primary and secondary education at the German School of Temuco. He later studied Law at the University of Chile and was admitted to the bar on 9 June 1986.

He received a scholarship to Germany, where he obtained the degree of Doctor iuris utriusque from Julius Maximilian University of Würzburg on 31 December 1985.

Beginning in 1998, he served as rector of the Universidad Autónoma de Chile until 2011. He also worked as Professor of Constitutional Law at the Faculty of Law of the University of Chile.

In 2015 he resumed his duties as rector of the Universidad Autónoma de Chile, leaving the position upon being appointed Minister of Foreign Affairs. In September 2020 he again assumed the office of rector at the same institution.

== Political career ==
In 1986 he began his political activities as advisor to the Minister of the Interior, Ricardo García, and participated in the drafting of the Political Parties Law.

The following year he was accredited as Minister Counselor and Legal Advisor at the Embassy of Chile in the Federal Republic of Germany.

In 1989 he joined National Renewal (RN) and ran for deputy for District No. 51 in the IX Region (Carahue, Nueva Imperial, Saavedra, Teodoro Schmidt, Freire, and Pitrufquén). He was elected in December with 13,273 votes (20.96% of the valid votes).

He was re-elected in 1993 with 17,800 votes (27%).

Between 2000 and 2003 he served as director of Televisión Nacional de Chile and as alternate justice of the Constitutional Court of Chile between 2006 and 2009.

On 18 July 2011 he assumed office as Minister of Justice during the first administration of President Sebastián Piñera. He resigned on 17 December 2012.

In June 2019 he assumed as Minister of Foreign Affairs during Piñera's second administration, serving until 28 July 2020.

In January 2023 he was appointed by the Senate, pursuant to Law No. 21,533, as a member of the Expert Commission responsible for drafting a preliminary proposal for a new Constitution to be submitted to the Constitutional Council.
