= Darío Valenzuela Van Treek =

Chilean politician

Darío Valenzuela

Mayor of Rancagua
- In office 6 December 1996 – 6 December 2000
- Preceded by: Esteban Valenzuela Van Treek
- Succeeded by: Pedro Hernández Garrido

Personal details
- Born: 1 January 1961 (age 65) Rancagua, Chile
- Party: Popular Unitary Action Movement (1985−1988); Party for Democracy (1988−2007); Socialist Party (2011−present)
- Relatives: Esteban Valenzuela Van Treek; Greny Valenzuela Van Treek
- Education: Pontifical Catholic University of Valparaíso (BA)
- Profession: Engineer

Darío Valenzuela Van Treek (born 1961) is a Chilean engineer and politician who served as mayor of Rancagua.
