= Luis Mayol =

Chilean politician and businessman

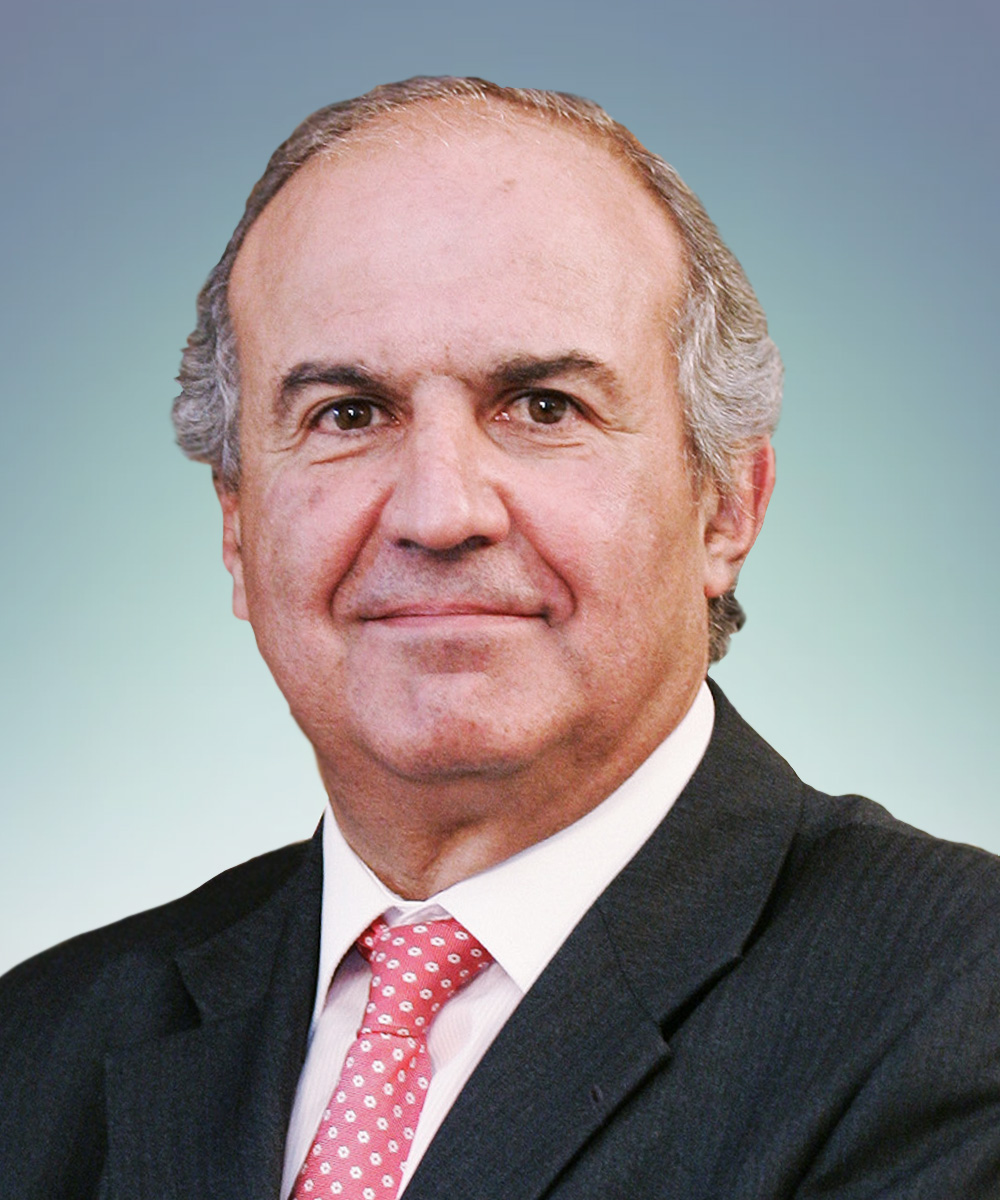
- Official portrait (2018)

Member of the Constitutional Convention
- In office 4 July 2021 – 4 July 2022
- Preceded by: office established
- Constituency: 23rd District

Intendant of the Araucanía Region
- In office 11 March 2018 – 28 November 2018
- Preceded by: Nora Barrientos
- Succeeded by: Jorge Atton Palma

Minister of Agriculture
- In office 29 December 2011 – 11 March 2014
- President: Sebastián Piñera
- Preceded by: José Antonio Galilea
- Succeeded by: Carlos Furche

Personal details
- Born: 27 November 1952 (age 73) Santiago, Chile
- Party: Renovación Nacional
- Spouse: Catalina Recordón
- Children: Five
- Parent(s): Luis Alejandro Mayol; Berta Bouchon
- Education: University of Chile (LL.B)
- Occupation: Politician, businessman
- Profession: Lawyer

Luis Alejandro Abel Mayol Bouchon (born 27 November 1952) is a Chilean lawyer and politician.

A member of National Renewal (RN), he was elected as a member of the Constitutional Convention in 2021, representing the 23rd District of the Araucanía Region.

He previously served as a cabinet minister from 2011 to 2014.

== Early life and family ==
Mayol was born in Santiago on 27 November 1952. He is the son of Luis Alejandro Mayol Bravo and Berta Sonia Bouchon González. He is married to Catalina Christiane Recordon Martin, with whom he has five children: Luis Felipe, Catalina Francisca, Maximiliano José, Amalia María, and Mario Eduardo.

Mayol completed his secondary education at The Grange School. He studied law at the University of Chile, graduating in 1978.

Linked to the agricultural sector through his family, he became a prominent figure as an owner and senior executive of the company Copeval and as president of the Sociedad Nacional de Agricultura. In 1979, together with Andrés Allamand, he co-founded the law firm Allamand, Barros, Mayol, Varela, Wagner y Cía. in Santiago. In 2019, he was appointed a member of the board of directors of Aguas Andinas.

== Political career ==
In December 2011, he was appointed Minister of Agriculture during the first administration of President Sebastián Piñera, a position he held until the end of that government in 2014.

On 11 March 2018, he assumed office as Intendant of the Araucanía Region, serving until 20 November of the same year.

In the elections held on 15–16 May 2021, Mayol ran as a candidate for the Constitutional Convention representing the 23rd District of the Araucanía Region as part of the Vamos por Chile electoral pact. He obtained 15,451 votes, corresponding to 9.5% of the valid votes cast, and was elected as a member of the Convention.
