= Emiliano Ortega =

Chilean politician

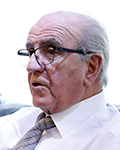

Minister of Transport and Telecommunications
- In office 11 March 1994 – 28 September 1996
- President: Eduardo Frei Ruíz-Tagle
- Preceded by: Juan Agustín Figueroa
- Succeeded by: Carlos Mladinic

National Director of the Agricultural and Livestock Service of Chile (SAG)
- In office 28 July 1967 – 3 November 1970
- President: Eduardo Frei Montalva
- Preceded by: Creation of the office
- Succeeded by: Juan Diemer Johanssen

Personal details
- Born: 7 April 1937 (age 89) Santiago, Chile
- Party: Christian Democratic Party
- Spouse: Patricia Correa (second wife)
- Children: Four
- Education: University of Chile (BA); University of Montpellier (MA)
- Occupation: Politician
- Profession: Agricultural engineer

Emiliano José Ortega Riquelme (born 7 April 1937) is a Chilean politician who served as minister of State under Eduardo Frei Ruíz-Tagle's government (1994–2000).

He has developed the most part of his political career in the agricultural area.

== Biography ==
He earned a degree in agronomy from the University of Chile and later completed postgraduate studies at the National Agronomic Institute in Montpellier, France. He subsequently received a doctorate in rural economics from the University of Montpellier.

After being widowed following the death of his first wife, Isabel Margarita Casassus, he married Patricia Correa. He was the father of four children and the brother of former deputy Eugenio Ortega, husband of former senator Carmen Frei, and of the late priest Miguel Ortega.

== Professional career ==
His career also included numerous leadership positions in professional associations, including serving as president of the Chilean Association of Agronomists.

He authored several books on agriculture and rural development, as well as numerous articles published in Chilean and international academic journals.

== Political career ==
He participated in the agricultural policy program of the Ministry of Agriculture during the administration of President Eduardo Frei Montalva (1964–1970).

During the same administration, he served as Director of Technical Assistance and Credit at the Institute for Agricultural Development (INDAP); Director General of Agriculture and Fisheries at the Ministry of Agriculture; organizer and first Executive Director of the Agricultural and Livestock Service (SAG); and founder of what is now the National Forestry Corporation (CONAF), originally established as the Reforestation Corporation (COREF).

He also worked for the state-owned Production Development Corporation (CORFO), contributing to the preparation of the National Livestock Program and the Agricultural Mechanization Program.

In 1994, while serving as head of the Agricultural Development Unit at the Economic Commission for Latin America and the Caribbean (ECLAC), he was appointed Minister of Agriculture by President Eduardo Frei Ruiz-Tagle. He remained in office until 1996.

He later became president of the Rural Education Institute.
