= Pedro Hidalgo =

Chilean politician (1936–2025)

Minister of Agriculture
- In office 27 January 1973 – 5 July 1973
- President: Salvador Allende
- Preceded by: Rolando Calderón
- Succeeded by: Ernesto Torrealba

Personal details
- Born: Pedro Hidalgo Ramírez; 1936 Antofagasta Region, Chile
- Died: 3 May 2025 (aged 88–89) Talca, Chile
- Party: PS
- Education: Austral University of Chile
- Occupation: Agricultural engineer

Pedro Hidalgo Ramírez (1936 – 3 May 2025) was a Chilean politician. A member of the Socialist Party, he served as Minister of Agriculture under President Salvador Allende from January to July 1973.

Hidalgo died in Talca on 3 May 2025.
