= Jaime Campos =

Chilean politician

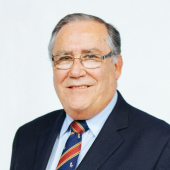

Minister of Agriculture
- Incumbent
- Assumed office 11 March 2026
- President: José Antonio Kast
- Preceded by: Ignacia Fernández Gatica
- In office 11 March 2000 – 11 March 2006
- President: Ricardo Lagos
- Preceded by: Ángel Sartori
- Succeeded by: Álvaro Rojas

Minister of Justice and Human Rights
- In office 19 October 2016 – 11 March 2018
- President: Michelle Bachelet
- Preceded by: Javiera Blanco
- Succeeded by: Hernán Larraín

Member of the Chamber of Deputies
- In office 11 March 1990 – 11 March 1994
- Preceded by: Constituency established
- Succeeded by: Romy Rebolledo
- Constituency: 38th District

Personal details
- Born: 19 February 1953 (age 73) Constitución, Chile
- Party: PR (since 2018)
- Other political affiliations: PR (1965−1971); SDCH (1971−1994); PRSD (1994−2018)
- Spouse: Yazmín Abad (m. 1984)
- Children: 3
- Education: University of Concepción
- Occupation: Lawyer • Politician

Jaime Alfonso Campos Quiroga (born 19 February 1953) is a Chilean lawyer and politician. He was minister during the governments of Ricardo Lagos (2000−2006) and Michelle Bachelet (2014−2018).

In the academic field, he has served as Professor of Criminal Law at the Faculty of Legal and Social Sciences of the University of Concepción, as Director of the Department of Criminal Law, and as a member of the Faculty Council of that institution.

He is a member of the International Association of Penal Law Professors and has participated in numerous national and international seminars and conferences.

== Biography ==
He was born in Constitución on 16 February 1953. He is the son of Olga Rosa Quiroga Henríquez and José del Carmen Campo Díaz.

In 1984, he married Jazmín Abad, with whom he has three children.

=== Professional career ===
He completed his primary education at Public School No. 1 of Constitución and his secondary education at the Liceo de Hombres de Constitución and at the boarding school of the Liceo de Hombres de Talca. After finishing secondary school, he enrolled at the Faculty of Law of the University of Concepción, where he obtained a licentiate degree in Legal and Social Sciences.

His undergraduate thesis was titled The Political Constitution of the State of Chile, in light of the amendments introduced by decree laws enacted during the years 1973 and 1974. He was admitted to the bar on 29 December 1975.

He practices law independently in the cities of Concepción and Constitución and is a partner at the law firm Zúñiga–Campos Abogados, founded in 1994.

== Political career ==
He began his political activity at an early age, joining the Radical Party (PR) at the age of twelve. During his university years, he served as president of the Radical University Group at his university. He later acted as the communal representative in Constitución for the No campaign during the 1988 plebiscite, subsequently serving as regional vice president for the Maule Region and as a leader within the Concertation of Parties for Democracy.

In the 1989 parliamentary elections, he was elected to the Chamber of Deputies representing District No. 38—comprising the communes of Curepto, Constitución, Empedrado, Maule, San Clemente, Pelarco, and Río Claro—in the Maule Region, for the 1990–1994 term, as a member of the Radical Party within the Concertation list. He obtained the highest vote share in the district with 34,538 votes, equivalent to 50.43% of the valid votes cast.

In 2000, President Ricardo Lagos appointed him Minister of Agriculture, a position he held until 11 March 2006. Later, on 19 October 2016, President Michelle Bachelet appointed him Minister of Justice and Human Rights, a post he held until 11 March 2018.
