= Ignacia Fernández Gatica =

Chilean sociologist and politician

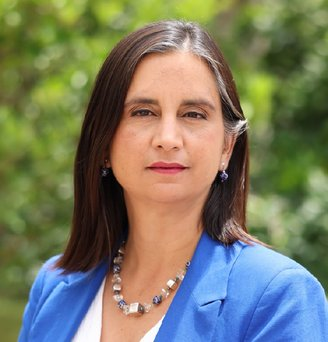

Minister of Agriculture
- In office 21 August 2025 – 11 March 2026
- President: Gabriel Boric
- Preceded by: Esteban Valenzuela
- Succeeded by: Jaime Campos

Personal details
- Born: 31 July 1973 (age 53) Santiago, Chile
- Education: Pontifical Catholic University of Chile; University of Chile; University of Barcelona
- Occupation: Politician
- Profession: Sociologist

María Ignacia Fernández Gatica (Santiago, July 31, 1973) is a Chilean sociologist, academic and politician. Since August 21, 2025, she has served as Chile's Minister of Agriculture under President Gabriel Boric.

== Biography ==
Fernández graduated in Sociology from the Pontifical Catholic University of Chile. She also holds a master's degree in Political Science from the University of Chile and a doctorate in Sociology from the University of Barcelona.

She began her professional career as a research assistant at the Latin American Studies Corporation (CIEPLAN). During Michelle Bachelet’s first term (2006–2010), she served as Head of the Policy and Studies Division at the Undersecretary of Regional and Administrative Development (SUBDERE), within the Ministry of the Interior. In this role, she contributed to the creation of the Los Ríos and Arica y Parinacota regions, helping to develop their first regional development strategies.

From 2010 to 2023, she worked at the Latin American Center for Rural Development (RIMISP), initially as a senior researcher and later as its Executive Director from 2015 to 2021.

In 2023, she was appointed Undersecretary of the Ministry of Agriculture during Gabriel Boric's administration. In May 2025, she resigned to join the campaign team of presidential candidate Carolina Tohá. Three months later, she was named Minister of Agriculture, becoming the third women to hold the position.
