= Nora Barrientos =

Chilean politician

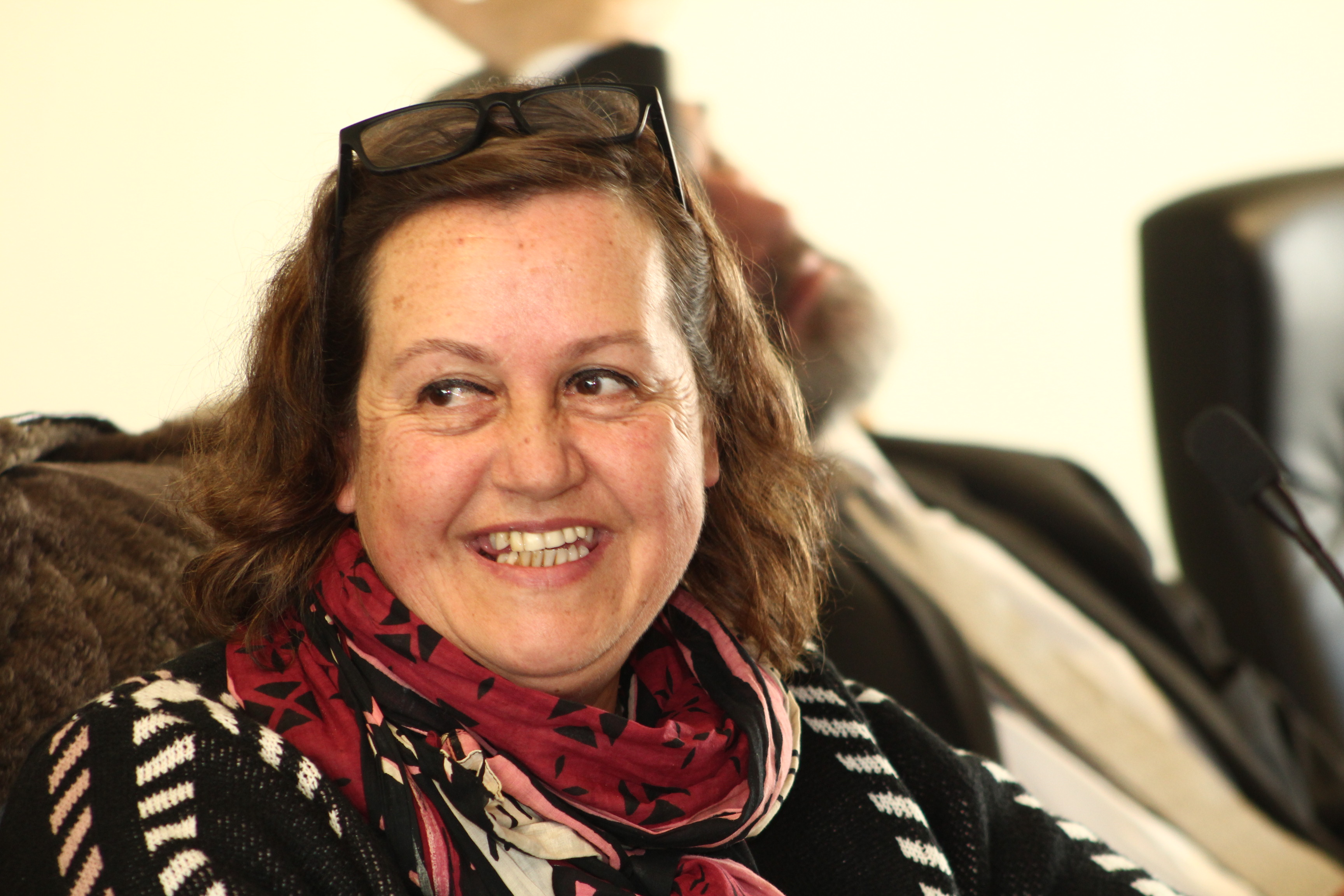

Intendant of the Araucanía Region
- In office 21 July 2017 – 11 March 2018
- President: Michelle Bachelet
- Preceded by: Miguel Hernández Saffirio
- Succeeded by: Luis Mayol
- In office 4 January 2008 – 11 March 2010
- President: Michelle Bachelet
- Preceded by: Oscar Eltit
- Succeeded by: Andrés Molina Magofke

Personal details
- Born: 1 January 1960 (age 66) Temuco, Chile
- Party: Socialist Party
- Education: Pontifical Catholic University of Valparaíso (BA)
- Profession: Agricultural engineer

Nora Barrientos Cárdenas (born 1960) is a Chilean agricultural engineer and politician who served as Intendant of the Araucanía Region.

== Political career ==
=== Early life ===
Barrientos studied agricultural engineering at the Pontifical Catholic University of Valparaíso. Since her university period she joined the Socialist Party.

=== As public official ===
In the state, Barrientos worked at CONADI (1997−2006) and at CORFO (2006−2008). In January 2008, she was appointed Intendant of the Araucanía Region by the president Michelle Bachelet. Her term ended together with the end of Bachelet's first government on 11 March 2010.

On 10 July 2017, she assumed as manager of the Recognition and Development Plan for Araucanía, created by Bachelet in her second government. However, she only lasted a few days in that position because then, on 21 July, she was appointed for second time as Intendant of La Araucanía, replacing Miguel Hernández Saffirio.
