= Esteban Valenzuela =

Chilean politician (born 1964)

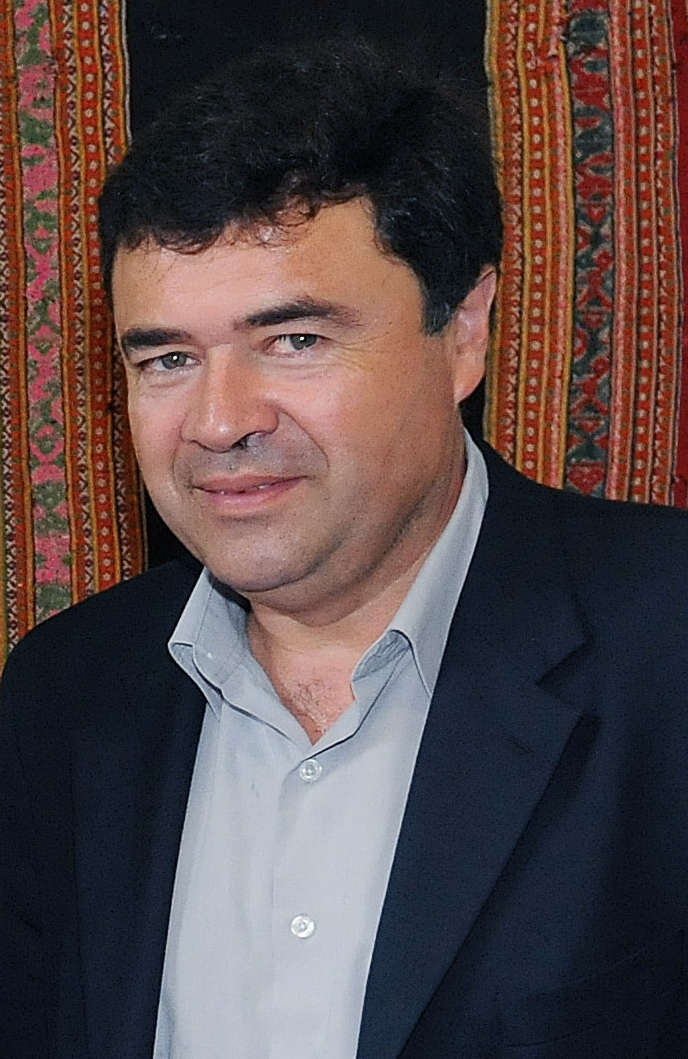

Minister of Agriculture
- In office 11 March 2022 – 20 August 2025
- President: Gabriel Boric
- Preceded by: María Emilia Undurraga
- Succeeded by: Ignacia Fernández Gatica

Member of the Chamber of Deputies
- In office 11 March 2002 – 11 March 2010
- Preceded by: Aníbal Pérez
- Succeeded by: Juan Luis Castro

Mayor of Rancagua
- In office 26 September 1992 – 6 December 1996
- Preceded by: Rodolfo Cortés Ferrada
- Succeeded by: Darío Valenzuela Van Treek

Personal details
- Born: 12 March 1964 (age 62) Rancagua, Chile
- Party: Party for Democracy (1987−2007); Chile Primero (2007−2009); Social Green Regionalist Federation (2017−present)
- Relatives: Darío Valenzuela Van Treek; Greny Valenzuela Van Treek
- Education: Pontifical Catholic University of Chile (BA in Journalism) (MA in Political Sciences); University of Wisconsin-Madison (MA in Public Management); University of Valencia (Ph.D in Contemporary History)
- Profession: Journalist; Political Scientist; Historian

Esteban Valenzuela Van Treek (born 12 March 1964) is a Chilean journalist, politician and writer, born in Rancagua. Since 11 March 2022, he has served as Chile's Minister of Agriculture. Mayor of Rancagua from 1992 to 1996, and Deputy from 2002 to 2010.

His brother Darío also was mayor of Rancagua.

Since January 2021, he is vice-president of the Social Green Regionalist Federation.

== Biography ==
He was born on 12 March 1964 in Rancagua. He is the son of Darío Valenzuela Carreño and Ema Van Treek Carrasco, and the brother of Darío Valenzuela, who also served as mayor of the Municipality of Rancagua.

He is married to Alejandra Pallamar Azúa and is the father of Amanda, Gregorio and Joaquín.

=== Professional career ===
He completed his primary education in Rancagua at the República Argentina Public School and Moisés Mussa School, and his secondary education at the Instituto O’Higgins of the Marist Brothers, graduating in 1981.

Between 1985 and 1991, he studied journalism at the Pontifical Catholic University of Chile (PUC), where he obtained his professional degree. He later completed a master's degree in political science at the same university (1999–2002) and a master's degree in public development and management at the University of Wisconsin in the United States (1996–1998).

In the professional field, he served as head of communications at the Labour Advisory Centre (CEDAL). He was also a contributing journalist for the newspaper Fortín Mapocho, a member of the editorial council of Mensaje magazine, and a co-founder of the digital newspaper El Rancahuaso. Together with Gastón Rojas, he founded the consultancy firm Instituto CRECES Capacitación Ltda., where he worked as a consultant. He also worked at the Friedrich Ebert Foundation in the areas of environment and local development.

He completed postgraduate diplomas in Communication for Action with Fernando Flores, the advanced training course “REDCOM”, and Situational Strategic Planning with Carlos Matus and the Friedrich Ebert Foundation of Germany. He served as manager and advisor of the Pro O’Higgins Corporation; was a member of the board of directors and professor at the University of Rancagua; and taught at ARCIS University and Diego Portales University. He collaborated in the Chile 2000 Programme at the Ideas Foundation, alongside Francisco Estévez, and served as an advisor to the German Technical Cooperation (GTZ) in public management improvement programmes for Colombia, Guatemala, Paraguay and the Dominican Republic.

In 2011, he obtained a PhD in Contemporary History from the University of Valencia, Spain, with the dissertation “Christianity, revolution and renewal in Chile: the Popular Unitary Action Movement (MAPU), 1969–1989”. He has also served as an academic at Alberto Hurtado University in Chile.

== Political career ==
He began his public activity as a coordinator of youth pastoral work during the military regime of Augusto Pinochet. In 1980, he was detained for the first time for promoting the cultural event Canto y Verdad. During his university years, he served as a class delegate, president of the student council, and in 1985 as vice-president of the first democratically elected Federation of Students of the Pontifical Catholic University of Chile (FEUC). During this period, he was detained on five occasions for leading peaceful protests and was held at Santiago Penitentiary.

He served as president of the Youth Wing of the Popular Unitary Action Movement (MAPU) and as a member of its Political Commission, as well as vice-president of the Union of Youth for Socialism (UJS). He was also national sub-coordinator of the Youth Command for the “No” campaign in the 1988 referendum.

In 1987, he participated in the founding group of the Party for Democracy (PPD), and in 2000 he was elected secretary general of the party.

In 1992, at the age of 28, he was elected mayor of Rancagua, a position he held until 1996. His administration focused on addressing infrastructure deficits in rural and working-class sectors, improving access to drinking water, street lighting, paving and green areas, and promoting urban modernisation projects such as new road openings, the bus terminal and the Paseo Independencia.

In early 2007, he resigned from the PPD and, together with Fernando Flores and Jorge Schaulsohn, founded the political movement Chileprimero, where he served as vice-president. After the movement expressed support for the presidential candidacy of Sebastián Piñera, he withdrew and joined an independent parliamentary list supporting the presidential candidacy of Marco Enríquez-Ominami.

In December 2009, he failed to be re-elected for a third term as a deputy for the O'Higgins Region.

Between April and October 2014, he chaired the Presidential Advisory Commission for Decentralisation and Regional Development, convened by President Michelle Bachelet. The commission's work contributed to advances in regional autonomy and territorial equity.

In 2017, he participated in the founding of the Social Green Regionalist Federation (FREVS), serving as its first vice-president. In January 2021, he was nominated in the primaries of the Broad Front (FA) and Chile Digno coalition as a candidate for Regional Governor of O’Higgins Region, but was not elected in the elections held on 15 and 16 May.

On 21 January 2022, he was appointed Minister of Agriculture by President-elect Gabriel Boric, assuming office on 11 March 2022.

== Works ==
- Fragmentos de una generación (1987)
- Cómo ganarle a la rabia (1988)
- Matilde espera carta de Alemania (1994)
- Pichilemu Blues (1996)
- La fecundidad de un gobierno local (1997)
- Alegato histórico regionalista (1999)
- El fantasma federal en Chile: la potencia de la reforma regional (2003)
- Soborno sour (2005)
- La voz terrible: Infante y el valdiviano federal (2008)
- Nahual Maya: los días con sentido (2012)
- Dios, Marx... y el MAPU (2014)
