= Antonio Walker =

Chilean politician (b. 1961)

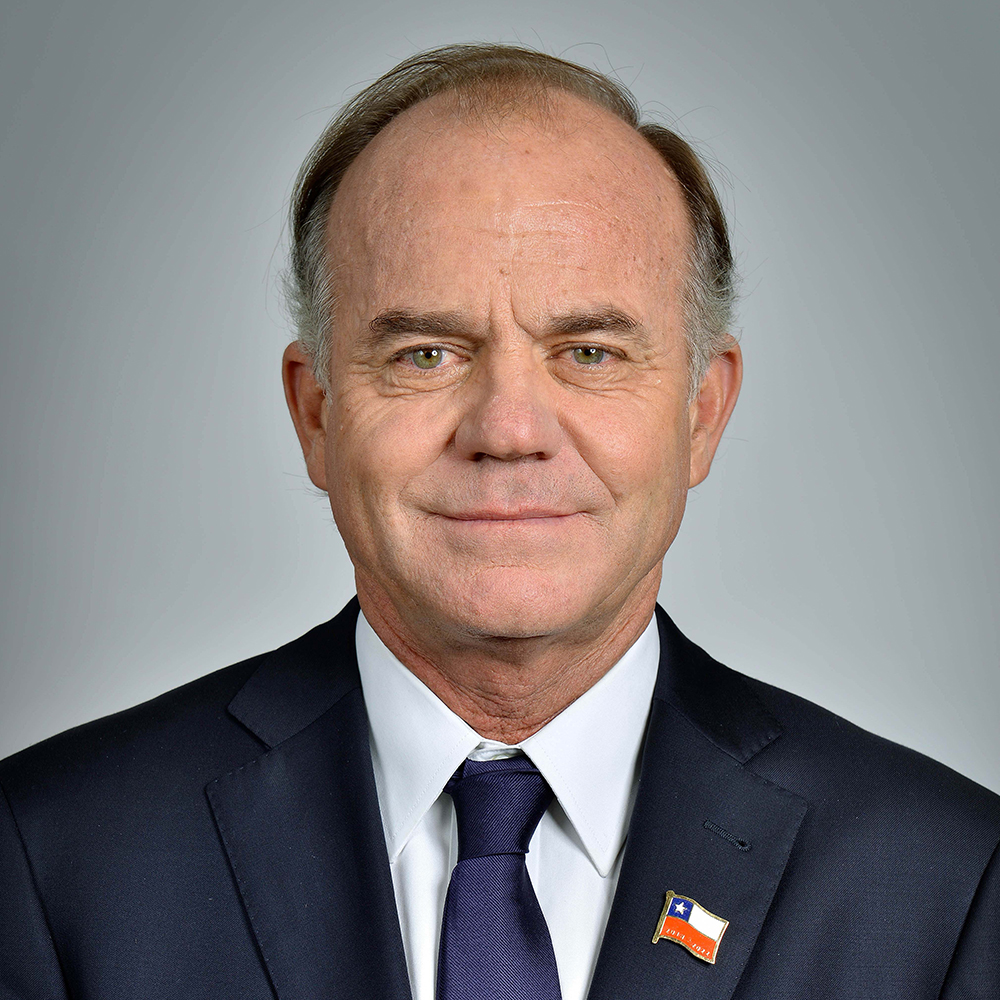
- Official portrait (2020)

Minister of Agriculture
- In office 11 March 2018 – 6 January 2021
- President: Sebastián Piñera
- Preceded by: Carlos Furche
- Succeeded by: María Emilia Undurraga

Personal details
- Born: 28 June 1961 (age 65) Santiago, Chile
- Spouse: Andrea Lecaros
- Children: 6
- Parent(s): Ignacio Walker Concha; Isabel Margarita Prieto Vial
- Relatives: Matías, Patricio and Ignacio (brothers)
- Education: Inacap (B.Sc); California Polytechnic State University (M.Sc)
- Occupation: Politician

José Antonio Walker Prieto (born 28 June 1961) is a Chilean politician and lawyer.

== Biography ==
He is the son of Ignacio Walker Concha and Isabel Margarita Prieto Vial, and the fifth of nine siblings of the Walker Prieto family. He is the brother of former senators Patricio Walker and Ignacio Walker, and of senator Matías Walker. He has been married since 1991 to Andrea Lecaros, with whom he has six children: Antonio, Andrés, Vicente, Martín, Raimundo and Matías.

He studied at Saint George's College and Colegio San Ignacio El Bosque in Santiago. He later graduated from INACAP as an agricultural technician and subsequently completed a Fruit Science major at the California State Polytechnic University.

== Professional career ==
He devoted his career to agriculture and is the founder of the agricultural company Wapri, dedicated to fruit production and export for more than two decades. He served as its general manager and, in 2004, reached the milestone of exporting its 200 millionth box of fruit.

He was also a prominent trade association leader in the Maule Region and nationally. In 2010, he was elected president of Fedefruta, serving until 2012, and was also president of Fruséptima, a trade association representing fruit producers in Maule.

He served as director of the National Agriculture Society (SNA) and is a member of the Productivity Commission of the Confederation of Production and Commerce (CPC).

== Political career ==
An independent politician close to Political Evolution (Evópoli).

He was invited to join the first administration of President Sebastián Piñera, which he declined. During Piñera’s second administration, however, he accepted the proposal and became Minister of Agriculture.

He has been recognized for promoting cooperativism among small-scale farmers and for supporting legislative initiatives, including the so-called “Ley Arbolito,” a bill aimed at protecting urban trees in Chile.

He resigned from office on 6 January 2021 in order to run for a seat in the Constitutional Convention representing District No. 17 in the April 2021 election, but was not elected.
