= Rolando Calderón =

Chilean politician

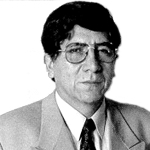

Governor of the Elqui Province
- In office 1 March 2005 – 11 March 2010
- Preceded by: Celso López
- Succeeded by: Pablo Argandoña

Member of the Senate of Chile
- In office 11 March 1990 – 11 March 1998
- Preceded by: District created
- Succeeded by: Sergio Fernández Fernández
- Constituency: 19th Circumscription

Minister of Agriculture
- In office 2 November 1972 – 27 March 1973
- President: Salvador Allende
- Preceded by: Jacques Chonchol
- Succeeded by: Pedro Hidalgo

Personal details
- Born: 17 September 1944 (age 81) Santiago, Chile
- Party: Socialist Party
- Spouse: Ana María Leyton
- Occupation: Politician

Rolando Calderón Aránguiz (born 17 September 1944) is a Chilean politician who served as minister of State and as a senator.

== Biography ==
=== Family and youth ===
He was born in Paine on 17 September 1944. He is the son of Pedro Juan Calderón Puebla and Lucía del Tránsito Aránguiz Ulloa. In 1990, he married Ana María Leyton.

=== Education and professional career ===
He completed his secondary education at the Industrial School of Rancagua, where he was elected president of the student council for two consecutive terms. In 1959, he was elected a leader of the Federation of Students of O’Higgins Province, and in 1960 he became a leader of the National Federation of Technical and Industrial Students of Chile.

== Political career ==
He began his political career by joining the Youth of the Socialist Party of Chile, where he served as Regional Secretary General for the O’Higgins Region.

He later participated in the founding of the Confederation of Peasants and Indigenous Peoples of Chile. In 1964, he was elected Secretary General of the Ranquil Peasant Confederation, and between 1965 and 1968 he served as a National Councillor of the Central Workers’ Union (CUT).

In 1967, he was elected a member of the Central Committee of the Socialist Party and collaborated with its National Agrarian Commission. In 1971, he assumed the position of National Secretary of the CUT and was appointed Deputy Secretary General of the Mass Front.

On 2 November 1972, President Salvador Allende appointed him to the Civic–Military Cabinet as Minister of Agriculture, a position he held until 27 March 1973. He later assumed the role of Minister of Labor, serving as biminister until 11 September 1973.

The military coup of 1973 took place while he was serving as minister. The Military Junta ordered him to report to the Ministry of National Defense through Bando No. 19. He sought asylum at the Embassy of Sweden.

In 1974, he went into exile in Sweden and later moved to France, Germany, and finally Argentina, where he founded the “Casa del Pueblo” to organize support for Chileans in exile. That same year in Paris, he became part of the External Committee of the CUT (CEXCUT), serving as its Secretary General, following the dissolution of the CUT by Decree Law No. 12 of the Military Junta.

He returned to Chile in 1988, one month before the plebiscite, having previously entered the country clandestinely on two occasions from Argentina. Upon his return, he was elected a member of the Central Committee and the Political Commission of the Socialist Party.

In the 1989 parliamentary elections, he ran as an independent candidate within the Concertación coalition for the 19th Senatorial District (12th Region). He was elected senator with 16,165 votes, representing 27.54% of the valid votes cast. On 8 March 1990, he formally joined the Socialist Party of Chile.

In 1997, he ran for re-election to the Senate for the same district, obtaining 16,165 votes (27.54%), but was not re-elected despite achieving the second-highest vote share in the district.

On 11 March 2006, President Michelle Bachelet appointed him Governor of the Province of Elqui, in the Coquimbo Region, a position he held until 11 March 2010. In July 2016, he served as Chief of Staff to the Intendant of the Coquimbo Region.
