= José Ruiz de Giorgio =

Chilean politician (born 1936)

José Ruíz de Giorgio
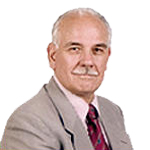

Member of the Senate of Chile
- In office 11 March 1990 – 11 March 2006
- Preceded by: Circumscription created
- Succeeded by: Pedro Muñoz Aburto
- Constituency: Magallanes Region (19th Circumscription)

Personal details
- Born: 7 April 1936 (age 90) Punta Arenas, Chile
- Party: Christian Democratic Party
- Spouse: Silva dos Santos
- Children: Four
- Education: Arturo Prat Naval Academy
- Occupation: Politician
- Profession: Merchant Sailor

José Ruíz de Giorgio (born 7 April 1936) is a Chilean politician who was a member of the Senate of Chile.

== Biography ==
He was born in the city of Punta Arenas on 7 April 1936, the son of José Atilio Ruiz Saraos and Ema de Giorgio. On 21 March 1958, José Ruíz de Giorgio married Silvia Dos Santos Fernández, with whom he had four children.

He completed his primary and secondary education in Punta Arenas and continued his studies at the Arturo Prat Naval Academy. In 1953 he embarked as a cadet in the Merchant Navy, earning with distinction the title of Regional Master for the Fifth Zone.

He later joined the Empresa Nacional del Petróleo (ENAP) in 1955, where he held various positions until 1988. He became head of the Maritime Transport Section in 1961, taking responsibility for the command of all ENAP-Magallanes vessels. He is among the trade union leaders who have received the Manuel Bustos Huerta Award.

== Political career ==
Ruiz began his political activity in 1958, when he joined the Christian Democratic Party (Chile), eventually serving as its National Vice President. In 1964, he led the establishment of a party branch in his hometown, where he served as its president. He also founded and presided over the Christian Democratic Party in the municipality of Primavera, on Tierra del Fuego, and on several occasions served as Provincial President of the party in the Magallanes Region.

Alongside his party activity, Ruiz promoted initiatives linked to social justice and Catholic social doctrine. He played a key role in the creation of a Workers’ Pastoral and a Justice and Peace Commission within the Diocese of Punta Arenas. Together with Cardinal Raúl Silva Henríquez and other prominent figures, he also participated in the formation of the South American Peace Commission.

His professional and union activities were closely connected to the defense of workers’ rights and national interests. In 1967, he was elected President of the National Command of Petroleum Workers, a position he held until 1987. He was also a founding member and Vice President of the National Workers’ Command (Comando Nacional de Trabajadores, CNT). In 1982, he became president of the ENAP–Magallanes Workers’ Union, and was subsequently reelected for two consecutive terms.

In the parliamentary elections of 14 December 1989, Ruiz ran for the Senate as a candidate of the Christian Democratic Party for the 19th Senatorial District (Magallanes and Chilean Antarctica Region) for the 1990–1998 term. He was elected with 35,220 votes, representing 44.61% of the valid ballots, obtaining first place in the district. In 1997, he sought reelection in the same district and was again elected with a first majority, securing 18,003 votes (30.67%). In 2005, he chose not to seek a third consecutive term in the Senate.
