= Autonomous University of Chile =

Private university in Santiago, Chile

Universidad Autónoma de Chile
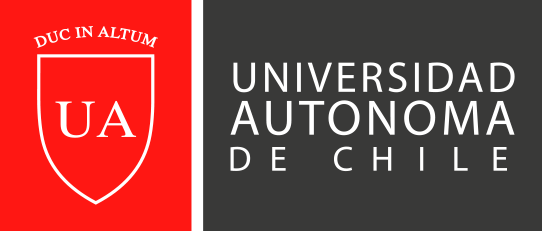
- Motto: Duc in altum
- Type: Private
- Established: August 11 de 1989 (37)
- Affiliations: Corporación de Universidades Privadas
- Rector: Teodoro Ribera Neumann
- Students: 25.605 (2019)
- Location: Av. Alemania 1090; Temuco 5 Poniente 1670; Talca; Av. Pedro de Valdivia 425 Providencia Av. Ricardo Morales 3369; El Llano, Santiago, Talca, Temuco
- Website: uautonoma.cl

The Universidad Autónoma de Chile (UAutónoma) is a private Chilean university. It has campuses in Temuco, Talca and Santiago (Providencia and Llano Subercaseaux).

It is affiliated to SUA (Single Admission System of Rector's Council of Chilean Universities).

The university is accredited by CNA-Chile (National Accreditation commission) for a term of 4 years (a maximum of seven years), from October 2019 to October 2023. UA ranks as the 23rd best university in Chile according to webometric classification of CSIC (June 2017), 61st in Latin America according to the Times Higher Education Latin American University Rankings. Among Chilean universities is currently among the top 14 of Scimago Institution Rankings (SIR) 2020, 19th at national level and 747 at international level.

== History ==
UAutónoma was founded on August 11, 1989 in Temuco city, capital of Araucanía region of Chile, under the name of "Universidad Autónoma de Sur", and subsequently, in 2006 changed its name to "Universidad Autónoma de Chile".

The university has full autonomy, which allows it to directly grant degree and diplomas. After its autonomy certification by High Education Board of Chile, the university has continued to maintain its institutional quality, for which has continued the process of homologation and the recognition of its degree plans and programs with Spanish universities of high tradition, such as those of Universidad de Barcelona, Universidad de Salamanca and Universidad de Sevilla, inter alia.

In January 2003, UAutonoma inaugurated its Talca campus in the facilities of Instituto Profesional Valle Central. By May of the same year El Llano Subercaseaux campus was settled in San Miguel commune, in the facilities of the former San Andrés University.

By 2009, Providencia campus was open, and a year later the university bought INCACEA's Institute of Sciences and Arts -which was in bankruptcy- to reinforce the brand and launch technical and professional studies academic offer, with headquarters in Las Condes and Viña de Mar. In 2012, after CAN-Chile refusal of accreditation, INCACEA closed down Viña del Mar campus.

In 2005, the university incorporated the new Providencia campus, with over 33,000 square meters.

== Administration ==
=== Presidents ===
- Teodoro Ribera Neumann (1998–2011)
- Ernesto Schifelbein (2011-2015)
- Teodoro Ribera Neumann (2015–2019)
- José Antonio Galilea (2019 - 2020)
- Teodoro Ribera Neumann (2020 - Present)

== Campuses ==
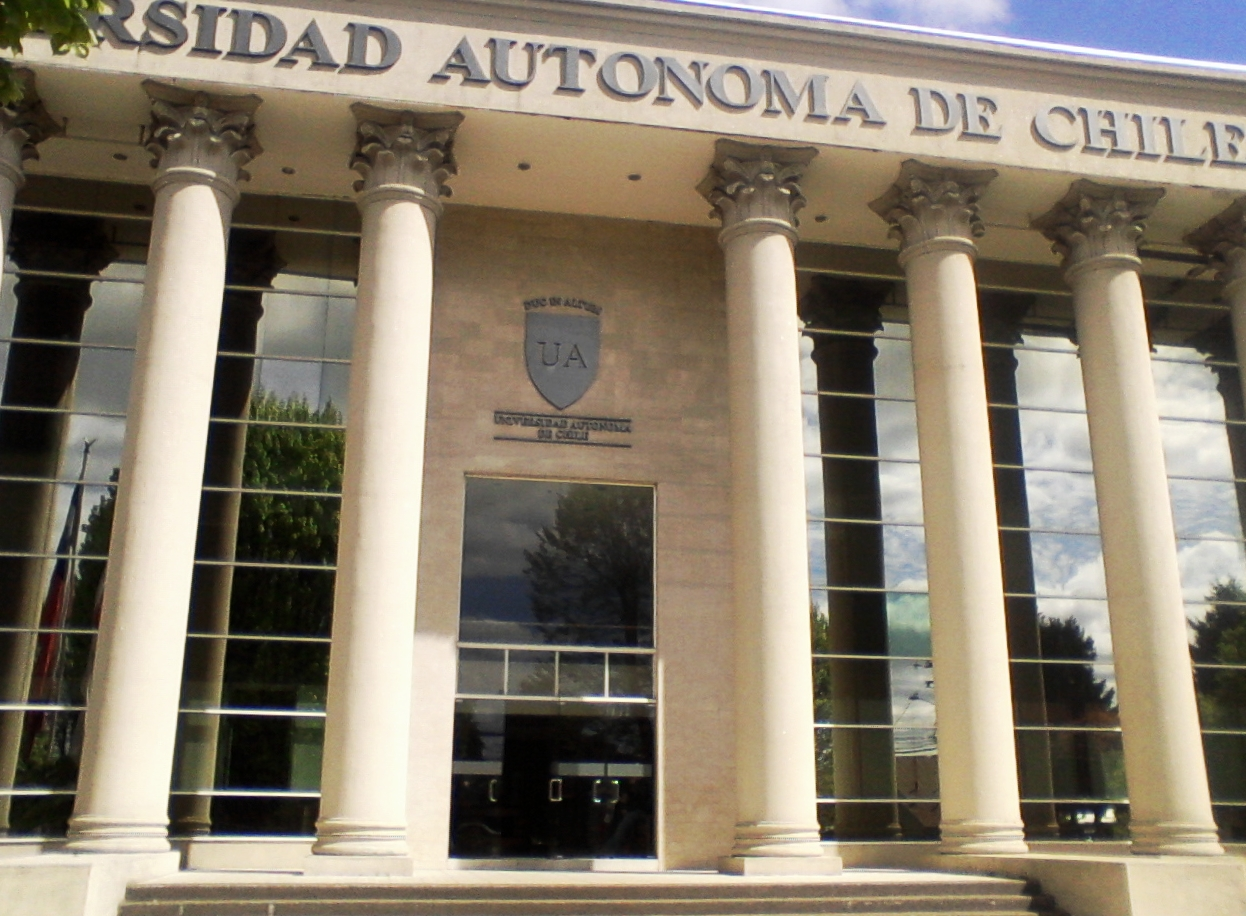
Campus Temuco en 2014.

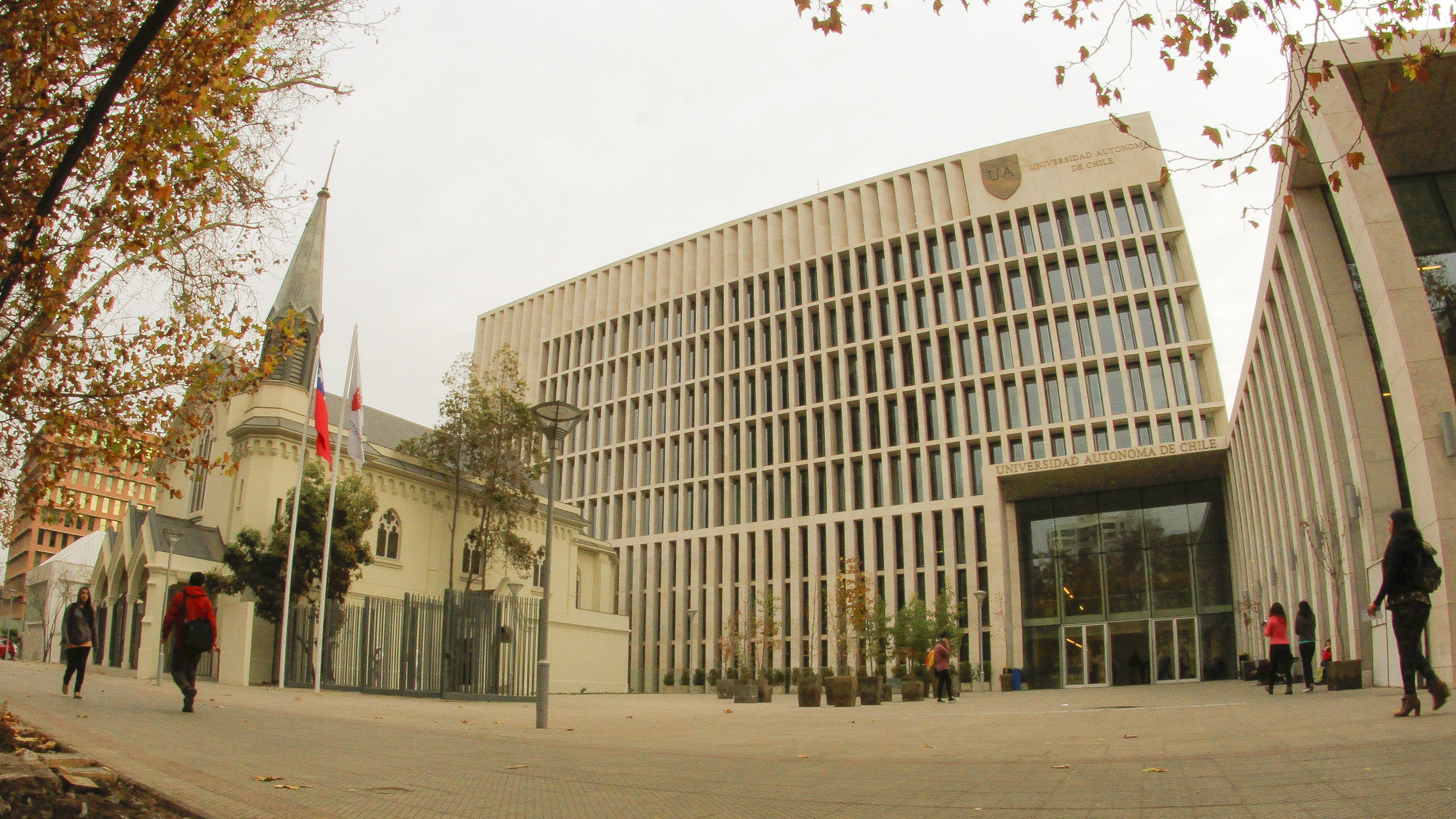
Campus Providencia.

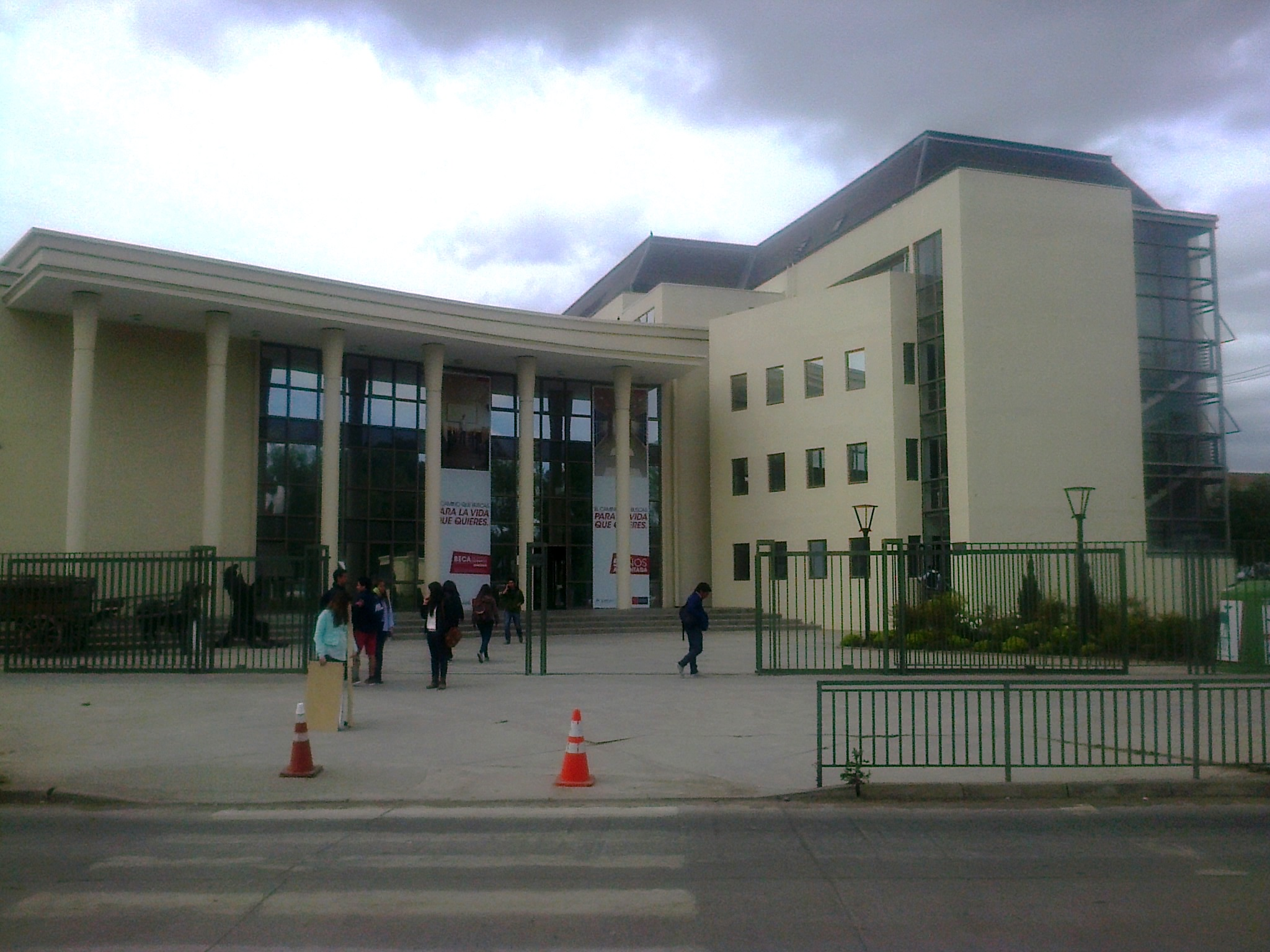
Campus Talca.

- Santiago:
  - Campus Providencia: Av. Pedro de Valdivia #425 - Av. Pedro de Valdivia #641
  - Campus El Llano Subercaseaux: Ricardo Morales #3369 (San Miguel).
- Temuco:
  - Campus Temuco: Av. Alemania #01090.
- Talca: 5 poniente #1670.

== Undergraduate Programs ==
UAutónoma offers undergraduate and postgraduate programs; courses, diploma courses, magister and doctoral studies. 88.5% of its degrees are accredited and 90.4% of its students are enrolled in certificated degrees that have this quality certification granted in 2016.

It is also affiliated with SUA (Single Admission System of Rector's Council of Chilean Universities).

=== Faculty of Health Sciences ===
- Nursing
- Phonoaudiology
- Kinesiology
- Medicine
- Nutrition and Dietetics
- Obstetrics and Pediatrics
- Odontology
- Occupational Therapy
- Chemistry and Pharmacy

=== Faculty of Architecture and Construction ===
- Architecture
- Construction or Civil Construction Engineering

=== Faculty of Business and Administration ===
- Audit and Management Control Engineering
- Business Administration Engineering
- Commercial Engineering

=== Faculty of Social Sciences and Humanities ===
- Public Administration
- Psychology
- Advertising and Comprehensive Communication
- Social Work
- Journalism

=== Faculty of Law ===
- Law

=== Faculty of Education ===
- Bachelor in Visual Arts
- Pedagogy in Elementary Education
- Pedagogy in Physical Education
- Pedagogy in Early Childhood Education
- Pedagogy in History, Geography and Social Sciences
- Pedagogy in English
- Pedagogy in Spanish Language and Communication
- Bachelor of Special Education

=== Faculty of Engineering ===
- Civil Computer Engineering
- Civil Industrial Engineering
- Chemical Engineering

== Postgraduate Studies ==
=== PhD Programs ===
- PhD Biomedical Science
- PhD Law
- PhD History

=== Master Degrees ===
For further info refer to: https://www.uautonoma.cl/postgrados/magisteres/

== Research ==
- Institute of Municipal Studies (ICHEM)
- Institute of Biomedical Sciences
- Institute of Applied Chemical Sciences
- Habitat Studies Institute
- Institute of Social and Humanistic Studies
- Law Research Institute
- Institute of Studies in Educational Sciences
