= Ángel Sartori =

Chilean politician

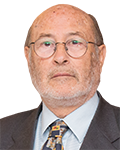
- Sartori as National Director of the SAG

National Director of the Agricultural and Livestock Service of Chile (SAG)
- In office 11 March 2014 – 11 March 2018
- President: Michelle Bachelet
- Preceded by: Horacio Bórquez Conti
- Succeeded by: Horacio Bórquez Conti

Minister of Agriculture
- In office 22 June 1999 – 11 March 2000
- President: Eduardo Frei Ruíz-Tagle
- Preceded by: Carlos Mladinic
- Succeeded by: Jaime Campos

Personal details
- Born: 6 February 1948 (age 78) Santiago, Chile
- Party: Christian Democratic Party
- Spouse: María Soledad Schuda Godoy (1973−present)
- Children: Two
- Parent(s): Ángel José Sartori Arellano; María Carolina Arellano Mardones
- Education: University of Chile
- Occupation: Politician
- Profession: Veterinary

Ángel José del Tránsito Sartori Arellano (born 6 February 1948) is a Chilean politician who served as minister of State. He was national director of the Agricultural and Livestock Service of Chile (SAG).

== Family and education ==
He is the son of Ángel José Sartori Arellano and María Carolina Arellano Mardones. He completed his higher education at the Liceo Manuel Barros Borgoño in Santiago, and later studied veterinary medicine at the University of Chile. He subsequently completed several postgraduate programs, including studies in agricultural economics.

He has been married since 1973 to nurse María Soledad Schuda Godoy, with whom he has two children: Carolina, a preschool educator, and Nicolás Andrés.

== Political career ==
In his early political career, he worked at Socoagro, a subsidiary of the state-owned Production Development Corporation (Corfo), which managed cold-storage facilities, dairy plants, and processed-meat factories in the Magallanes Region, in southern Chile. He later worked for an extended period in various units of the Agricultural and Livestock Service (SAG).

During the administration of President Patricio Aylwin, he collaborated with the National Commission for Drought at the Ministry of Agriculture.

He assumed office as a minister during the presidency of Eduardo Frei Ruiz-Tagle, serving until the end of that administration in 2000. He subsequently moved to Rome, Italy, where he served as ambassador of Chile’s Permanent Mission to the Food and Agriculture Organization (FAO).

In March 2014, during the second government of Michelle Bachelet, he was appointed National Director of the SAG, a position he held until the end of the administration in March 2018.
