= Carlos Furche =

Chilean politician

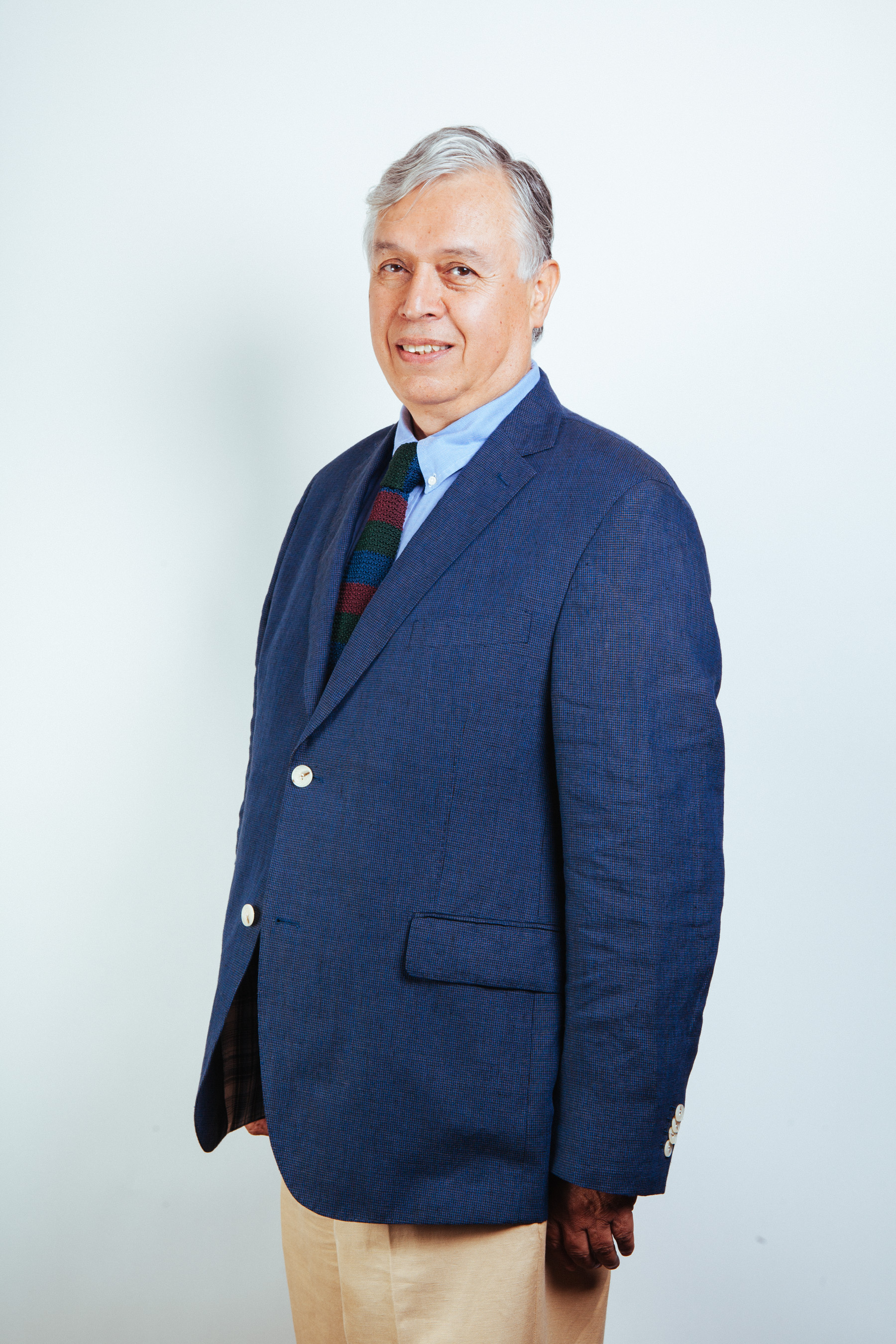

Minister of Agriculture
- In office 11 March 2014 – 11 March 2018
- President: Michelle Bachelet
- Preceded by: Luis Mayol
- Succeeded by: Antonio Walker

Personal details
- Born: 24 December 1950 (age 75) Punta Arenas, Chile
- Party: Socialist Party
- Education: Austral University of Chile (B.Sc); Latin American Council of Social Sciences (M.D)
- Occupation: Scholar; Politician
- Profession: Agricultural engineer

Carlos Furche Guajardo (born 24 September 1950) is a Chilean agricultural engineer and politician who served as minister during the second government of Michelle Bachelet (2014−2018).

During his professional career, Furche has provided different international services specialized in agricultural trade negotiations and the management of the free trade agreements of Chile. By the other hand, he worked for the Ministry of Agriculture from 1994 to 2004, where he served as the national director of the Office Agrarian Studies and Policies (ODEPA). From 2004 to 2010, he was director of the International Economic Relations.

He has provided services for the World Bank and the International Monetary Fund (IMF) advising the Republic of Georgia. In 2011, he worked as an advisor to the Ministry of Commerce, Industry and Tourism of Colombia.

== Early life ==
Born in Punta Arenas, he is the son of Carlos Domingo Furche Fernández and Julia Guajardo Gómez, an agricultural engineer by profession. Then, in 1973, Furche married the matron Olga María Veloso Yáñez, with whom he has two children. Nevertheless, they divorced in 2013.

Furche studied agronomic engineering with a major in agrarian economics at the Austral University in Valdivia. Likewise, he has a master's degree in sociology for the Latin American Council of Social Sciences (CLACSO).

== Political career ==
In his youth, he was a member of Christian Left and later of the Socialist Party (PS).

In January 2014, he was appointed by President-elect Michelle Bachelet as Minister of Agriculture in her second government. He took office on 11 March, remaining in office until the end of the government in March 2018.
