= Juan Agustín Figueroa =

Chilean politician

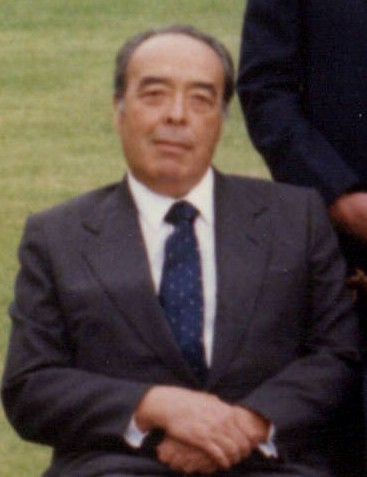

Minister of Agriculture
- In office 11 March 1990 – 11 March 1994
- President: Patricio Aylwin
- Preceded by: Juan Ignacio Domínguez
- Succeeded by: Emiliano Ortega

Personal details
- Born: 25 November 1933 Santiago, Chile
- Died: 7 July 2016 (aged 82) Santiago, Chile
- Party: Radical Party (1952−1994); Radical Social Democratic Party (1994−2016)
- Spouse: Marcela Paz Elgueta
- Children: Four
- Parent(s): Rafael Figueroa; Aida Yávar
- Education: University of Chile (LL.B)
- Occupation: Politician
- Profession: Lawyer

Juan Agustín Figueroa Yávar (25 November 1933 − 7 July 2016) is a Chilean politician who served as minister of State.

== Biography ==
The son of Rafael Figueroa González and Aida Yávar, he completed his primary and secondary education at the German School of Santiago and his university studies at the Faculty of Law of the University of Chile, where he obtained his degree as a lawyer in 1958.

At that institution, he met and became friends with local businessman Ricardo Claro (1934–2008), who went on to lead business groups spanning sectors ranging from industry to transport, including wineries and the media.

In the academic field, he was a full professor of procedural law at the Faculty of Law, University of Chile and president of the Governing Board of the University of Santiago.

Due to his friendship with Claro, he served as a director of various companies, including Compañía Electro Metalúrgica (Elecmetal), Marítima de Inversiones S.A. (Marinsa), Cristalerías de Chile, and Viña Santa Rita. Following the latter's death in October 2008, he was appointed president of that winery.

In his professional career, he practiced law together with Alberto Coddou and Juan Esteban Correa in a law firm founded in 1923 by his father, in which Vicente Monty and Sergio Insunza had also previously worked, and which is currently headed by his son Ignacio Figueroa. In his professional practice, he took part in criminal cases; corporate, commercial, and mining arbitration; defense of public bodies against claims by private parties; partition proceedings in matters of inheritance; civil and commercial compensation lawsuits before the ordinary courts; and the handling of appeals in cassation in civil and criminal matters before the Supreme Court. He was also one of the founding partners of the digital newspaper El Mostrador and a member of its first board of directors.

== Political career ==
In his political activity, in 1952, at the age of 18, he joined the Radical Party. During the military dictatorship, he helped form the Group of 24, working alongside figures such as Enrique Silva Cimma, Patricio Aylwin, Edgardo Boeninger, Fernando Castillo Velasco, and Alejandro Silva Bascuñán, among others, laying the foundations of what would later become the Concertation of Parties for Democracy. He was one of the founders of the Unitary Social Democratic Movement, created in 1986 by dissidents from the Social Democracy Party and later integrated into the Radical Party.

=== Minister of State: 1990–1994 ===
Between 1990 and 1994, he served as Minister of Agriculture under President Patricio Aylwin, where he played a fundamental role in the so-called “New Imperial Pact”, a document that gave rise to the Indigenous Law, which created the National Corporation for Indigenous Development. His intervention in the Meat Law was also significant.

He was president of the Pablo Neruda Foundation, which had been created at the initiative of Matilde Urrutia by a group of individuals that also included his spouse, Marcela Elgueta.

He was a member of the Constitutional Court of Chile. He was appointed to this position by President Ricardo Lagos, who was also a close associate.

After his ministerial tenure, he appeared in the media due to conflicts with individuals mainly identified with the Mapuche cause or ethnicity in the area of Traiguén, in the Araucanía Region, an area where his family has owned land directly since the early, lands that have been the target of arson attacks, as a result of which the courts have had to intervene.

His close personal ties and friendship with several justices of the Supreme Court, such as Marcos Libedinsky, José Luis Pérez, and Urbano Marín, led some, toward the end of his professional activity, to refer to him as the “twenty-second minister”.

He died in Santiago on 7 July 2016. His remains were laid out in the Hall of Former Grand Masters of the Grand Lodge of Chile.
