= Álvaro Rojas =

Chilean politician, diplomat and academic

Rector of the University of Talca
- In office 24 March 2010 – 4 May 2022
- Preceded by: Juan Antonio Rock
- Succeeded by: Carlos Torres
- In office 1991–2006
- Preceded by: Guillermo Monsalve
- Succeeded by: Juan Antonio Rock

Minister of Agriculture
- In office 11 March 2006 – 8 January 2008
- President: Michelle Bachelet
- Preceded by: Jaime Campos
- Succeeded by: Marigen Hornkohl

Ambassador of Chile to Germany
- In office 8 January 2008 – 11 March 2010
- Preceded by: Marigen Hornkohl
- Succeeded by: Jorge O'Ryan

Personal details
- Born: 25 September 1953 (age 73) Santiago, Chile
- Party: Christian Democratic
- Spouse: Clara Henríquez
- Children: Two
- Parent(s): Manuel Hipólito Rojas Acevedo; Marta Victoria Marín
- Education: University of Chile (BA); Technical University of Munich (MA)
- Occupation: Academic
- Profession: Veterinary medicine

Álvaro Manuel Rojas Marín (born 9 May 1953) is a Chilean politician, diplomat and academic who served as the Minister of Agriculture from 2006 to 2008.

== Biography ==
He is the son of Manuel Rojas Acevedo and Marta Marín. He graduated from the German School of Santiago and later studied veterinary medicine at the University of Chile. Between 1972 and 1974, representing his political party, he served as president of the student association of his degree program.

He taught macroeconomics, rural development, and agricultural economics at the same university and at other higher education institutions. He later obtained a doctorate in agricultural sciences from LMU Munich, Germany.

He received scholarships from the Konrad Adenauer Foundation and the Alexander von Humboldt Foundation, and has served as a consultant to the ECLAC and the FAO.

From 1991 to 2006, he served as rector of the University of Talca, a state-owned institution. Altogether, he has held the position for 25 non-consecutive years.

Between 2002 and 2004, he chaired the Association of Regional Universities.

== Political career ==
Between 1994 and 1997, he chaired the Agricultural Innovation Council of the Ministry of Agriculture, and from 1997 to 2000 he served as national coordinator of the Chile–Germany Scientific Cooperation Program of Chile's Ministry of Foreign Affairs.

Michelle Bachelet appointed him Chilean ambassador to Germany. After completing his diplomatic assignment, he returned to Chile and was re-elected rector of the University of Talca for the 2010–2014 term The election was decided in the first round on 23 March, with Rojas receiving 62% of the vote, and again for the 2014–2018 term. The election was decided in the first round on 19 March, with Rojas receiving 77% of the vote as the sole candidate.

He has been married since 1977 to educator Clara Victoria Henríquez de la Jara, and they have two daughters, Carolina Fernanda and Francisca Catalina.

In 2022, he was elected Executive Director of CINDA (Centro Interuniversitario de Desarrollo, the Inter-University Development Center).
