= Pichilemu Blues =

- Cover of the book.
- Author: Esteban Valenzuela
- Language: Spanish
- Subject: Pichilemu
- Genre: Novel
- Publisher: Editorial Los Andes
- Publication date: 1993
- Publication place: Chile
- ISBN: 956-7014-39-6

Pichilemu Blues is a 1993 book written by Chilean politician Esteban Valenzuela. A movie based on the book was also released, starring Peggy Cordero, Ximena Nogueira and Evaristo Acevedo.

== Plot ==
The Pichilemu Blues story is situated in Pichilemu during the summer of 1973. The main characters are a group of teenagers that are discovering a world abounding with hippies, sexual revolutions, ideological transformations, its own language (Chilean Spanish) and anxiety to change the world.
