= Marigen Hornkohl =

Chilean politician

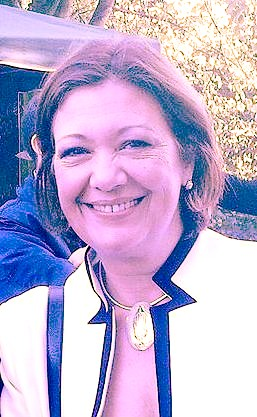

Minister of Agriculture
- In office 8 January 2008 – 11 March 2010
- President: Michelle Bachelet
- Preceded by: Álvaro Rojas
- Succeeded by: José Antonio Galilea

Ambassador of Chile at Germany
- In office March 2006 – 8 January 2008
- President: Michelle Bachelet
- Preceded by: Mariano Fernández
- Succeeded by: Álvaro Rojas

Minister of Education
- In office 14 December 2005 – 11 March 2006
- President: Ricardo Lagos
- Preceded by: Sergio Bitar
- Succeeded by: Martín Zilic

Undersecretary of Education
- In office 11 March 2003 – April 2005
- President: Ricardo Lagos
- Preceded by: José Weinstein
- Succeeded by: Pedro Montt Leiva

Undersecretary of Social Prevision
- In office 11 March 2000 – 11 March 2003
- President: Ricardo Lagos
- Preceded by: Patricio Tombolini
- Succeeded by: Macarena Carvallo

Personal details
- Born: 25 September 1953 (age 73) Santiago, Chile
- Party: Christian Democratic
- Spouse: Jorge Salas
- Children: Five
- Education: University of Chile (B.Sc); Heidelberg University (M.Sc)
- Occupation: Researcher and Scholar
- Profession: Social worker

Marigen Ariadna Julia Hornkohl Venegas (born 25 September 1953) is a Chilean social worker and politician who served as minister during the first government of Michelle Bachelet (2006–2010).

She has a Master of Arts in History at the Heidelberg University.

She served as Minister of Education during Ricardo Lagos' government, and later as Minister of Agriculture during the first administration of President Michelle Bachelet. She also served as Chilean ambassador to Germany.

== Biography ==
She completed her secondary education at the Liceo A-1 Javiera Carrera. She qualified as a social worker at the University of Chile and subsequently pursued graduate studies in history at the Heidelberg University, Germany.

During the administration of Patricio Aylwin, she served as Head of Public Relations and a member of the senior management team of the National Women's Service (SERNAM). During the administration of Eduardo Frei Ruiz-Tagle, she worked as chief of staff and communications adviser (1995–1999) to Minister of Justice Soledad Alvear.

During the administration of President Ricardo Lagos, she served as Undersecretary of Social Security between 2000 and 2003, a period in which unemployment insurance, the multifund pension system, and regulations governing the annuity market were introduced.

She subsequently served as Undersecretary of Education from March 2003 to April 2005, resigning to join the presidential pre-campaign team of Soledad Alvear.

After Alvear withdrew from the Concertación presidential primary race, Hornkohl ran for a seat in the Chamber of Deputies representing the communes of La Reina and Peñalolén in the 2005 Chilean parliamentary election, finishing third with 18.04% of the vote.

Following the resignation of Education Minister Sergio Bitar to join Michelle Bachelet's presidential campaign, she was appointed Minister of Education by President Ricardo Lagos in December 2005, serving during the final three months of his administration.

Between 2006 and early 2008, she served as Chilean ambassador to Germany.

As one of the closest collaborators of Soledad Alvear, she was appointed Minister of Agriculture on 8 January 2008, becoming the first woman to hold the office. Her appointment was widely interpreted as a gesture by the government toward the then-president of the Christian Democratic Party during a period of internal tensions caused by the expulsion of Senator Adolfo Zaldívar.

During the second administration of Michelle Bachelet, she was appointed Executive Director of the National Television Council (CNTV) for the 2014–2022 term.

Since 2023, she has served as rector of the Miguel de Cervantes University.
