= José Antonio Galilea =

Chilean businessperson and politician

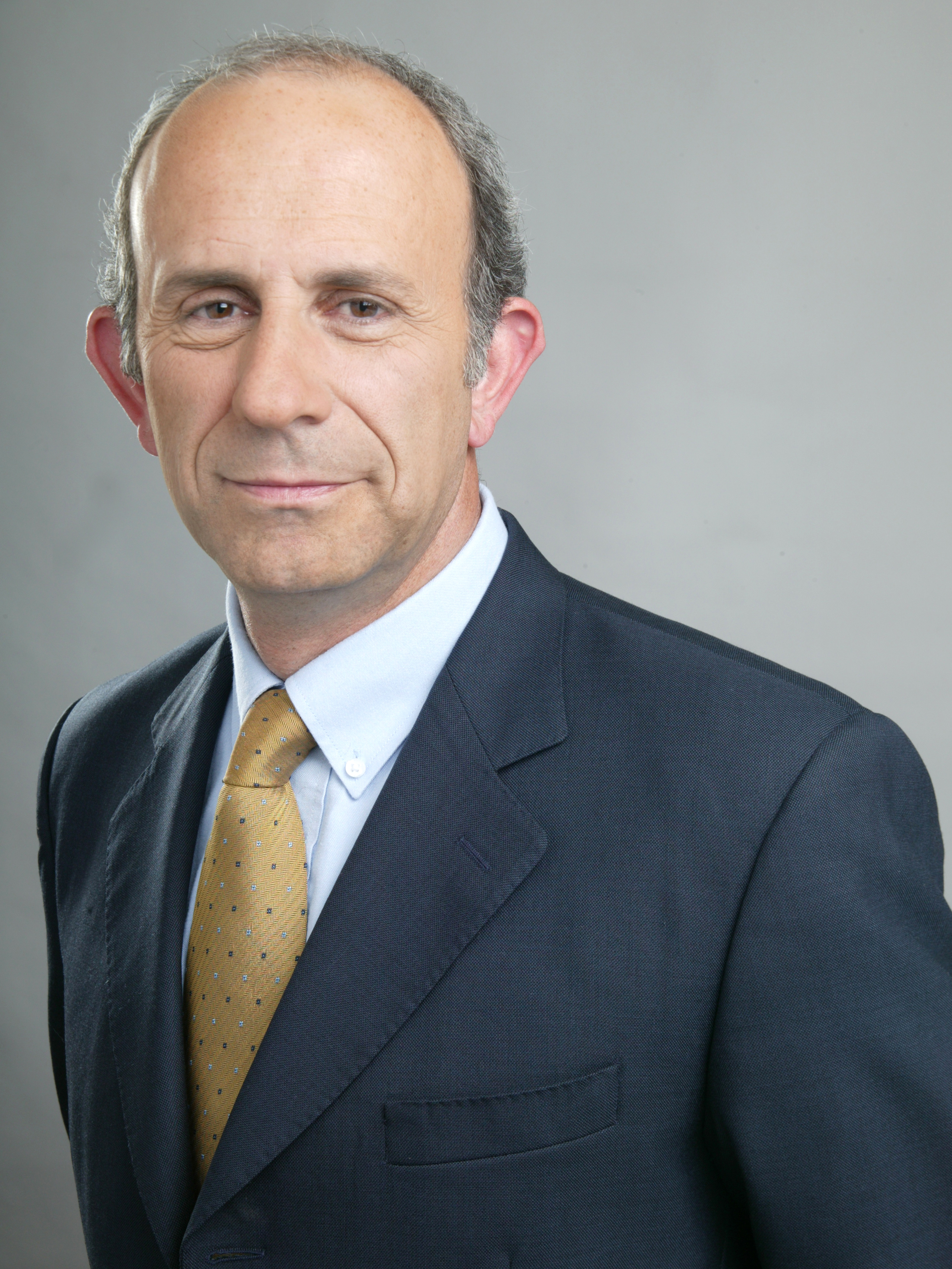

Minister of Agriculture
- In office 11 March 2010 – 29 December 2011
- President: Sebastián Piñera
- Preceded by: Marigen Hornkohl
- Succeeded by: Luis Mayol

Member of the Chamber of Deputies
- In office 11 March 1990 – 11 March 2006
- Preceded by: Creation of the district
- Succeeded by: Enrique Estay
- Constituency: 49th District

Personal details
- Born: 19 November 1961 (age 64) Santiago, Chile
- Party: National Renewal
- Spouse: Lorena Oyarce
- Children: 3
- Parent(s): José Galilea; Rosita Vidaurre
- Occupation: Politician entrepreneur

José Antonio Galilea Vidaurre (born 19 November 1961) is a Chilean agricultural entrepreneur and politician.

He served as Deputy for District No. 49 of the IX Region of La Araucanía from 1990 to 2006, and as Minister of Agriculture between 11 March 2010 and 29 December 2011 during the first administration of President Sebastián Piñera.

== Family and early life ==
He was born on 19 November 1961 in Santiago. He is the son of José Galilea and Rosita Vidaurre.

He is married to Lorena Oyarce Carrillo, a pharmaceutical chemist, and is the father of Catalina, Juan Pablo and Raimundo.

== Professional career ==
He completed his primary and secondary education at Colegio del Verbo Divino in Santiago. He later pursued higher education at the Instituto Nacional de Capacitación Profesional (INACAP), graduating as an agricultural technician with a specialization in livestock farming.

In the private sector, he worked as an agricultural entrepreneur dedicated to the commercialization of agricultural products, machinery and inputs.

In August 2019, he assumed as rector of the Universidad Autónoma de Chile, a position he held until September 2020.

== Political career ==
In 1983 he settled in Victoria, in the IX Region. In 1987 he participated in the founding of National Renewal in that city, holding several leadership positions within the party. In 1989 he was elected regional vice president and later served as local president.

In the 1989 parliamentary elections, he was elected Deputy representing Renovación Nacional for District No. 49 (Curacautín, Galvarino, Lautaro, Lonquimay, Melipeuco, Perquenco, Victoria and Vilcún), IX Region of La Araucanía, for the 1990–1994 legislative period. He obtained 14,024 votes (21.25%).

He was re-elected in 1993 for the 1994–1998 term with 18,773 votes (28.60%). In 1997 he was re-elected for the 1998–2002 period, obtaining the first majority in the district with 13,596 votes (23.93%). In 2001 he was re-elected once more for the 2002–2006 term, again achieving the first majority with 16,764 votes (26.41%).

After completing his fourth term in 2006, he stepped away from Congress to focus on agricultural and livestock ventures in the IX Region. He maintained close ties with agricultural and business leaders in the area, joined the Strategic Council of the Regional Development Agency of La Araucanía, and participated in the Encuentros Empresariales de La Araucanía (ENELA).

On 2 July 2008 he was appointed member of the board of Televisión Nacional de Chile (TVN) for an eight-year term, serving until 11 March 2010. He also became a member of the board of the Universidad Autónoma de Chile and founded a consulting firm that provided services to the mayor of Temuco, Miguel Becker (2008–2011).

On 11 March 2010 he was appointed Minister of Agriculture by President Sebastián Piñera. Prior to assuming office, he resigned from all previously held positions. He was replaced on 29 December 2011 by Luis Mayol.
