= Ignacio Walker =

Chilean lawyer, politician, diplomat and author

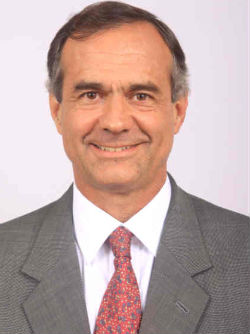

Member of the Senate
- In office 11 March 2010 – 11 March 2018
- Preceded by: Carlos Ominami
- Succeeded by: New district
- Constituency: 5th Circumscription

Minister of Foreign Affairs
- In office 29 September 2004 – 11 March 2006
- President: Ricardo Lagos
- Preceded by: Soledad Alvear
- Succeeded by: Alejandro Foxley

Member of the Chamber of Deputies
- In office 11 March 1994 – 11 March 2002
- Preceded by: Eduardo Cerda
- Succeeded by: María Eugenia Mella
- Constituency: 10th District

Personal details
- Born: 7 January 1956 (age 70) Santiago, Chile
- Party: Christian Democratic Party (–2022)
- Education: University of Chile

Ignacio Walker Prieto (born 7 January 1956) is a Chilean lawyer, politician, and, author who has served as minister and parliamentary in his country.

A former member of the Christian Democratic Party. He served as a Senator for the 5th Senatorial District (Cordillera), representing the Valparaíso Region, between 2010 and 2018. In August 2010, Walker was elected president of the Christian Democratic Party for a two-year term and served in that role until 27 April 2015.

Previously, he was a Member of the Chamber of Deputies for District No. 10 in the Valparaíso Region, serving two consecutive terms between 1994 and 2002. He also served as Foreign Minister during the administration of President Ricardo Lagos from 2004 to 2006. Walker was a member of the Christian Democratic Party for more than 30 years, ending his affiliation on 7 November 2022.

From 21 June 2006 to August 2007, he served as a member of the board of directors of Televisión Nacional de Chile.

Walker has been active as an author of books and scholarly articles published in academic journals in Chile, the United States, Spain, France, Brazil, the United Kingdom, and Uruguay. His work has appeared in journals such as Comparative Politics, Foreign Affairs, Dissent, Estudios Públicos, Estudios Internacionales, and the Revista de Ciencia Política.

== Early life and education ==
Walker was born in Santiago on 7 January 1956. He is the son of Ignacio Joaquín Walker Concha and Isabel Margarita Prieto Vial.

He is the brother of former senator Patricio Walker Prieto and current independent senator Matías Walker Prieto. His grandfather, Horacio Walker Larraín, and his great-grandfather, Joaquín Walker Martínez, both served as senators of the Republic of Chile. He is married to María Cecilia Echeñique Celis, with whom he has three children.

He completed his primary and secondary education at Saint George's College. He later studied law at the University of Chile, obtaining his law degree in 1980. In 1982, he completed a Doctorate in Political Science at Princeton University in the United States.

== Professional career ==
Between 1978 and 1982, Walker worked as a lawyer for the Vicariate of Solidarity.

After completing his doctoral studies abroad, he returned to Chile and worked as an associate researcher at the Corporation for Latin American Economic Research (CIEPLAN). Concurrently, until 1990, he served as a professor in the Master’s Program in Political Science at the Pontifical Catholic University of Chile. He later served as director of the Master’s Program in Political Science at Andrés Bello University.

Between 1989 and 1990, he served as president of the Chilean Political Science Association. From 1990 until 1993, he headed the Division of Political and Institutional Relations at the Ministry General Secretariat of the Presidency.

Between 2007 and 2008, Walker was a visiting professor and research fellow at Princeton University in the United States.

== Political career ==
Upon Walker's graduation from the University of Chile in 1978, he joined Vicaría de la Solidaridad as an attorney-at-law. At Vicaría de la Solidaridad, Walker defended people against human rights violations committed by the regime of General Augusto Pinochet.

Walker served as a Deputy in the Chilean Parliament (1994-2002), President of the Christian Democratic Party (2010-2015), and Senator (2010-2018). He also served as Foreign Minister of Chile (2004-2006). In 1982, he earned a PhD in political science from Princeton University. Between 2007 and 2008, he was a visiting professor and researcher at Princeton University. In 2018, Walker became the Kellogg Institute’s Hewlett Fellow for Public Policy at the University of Notre Dame.

Walker was a panel member in the Kellogg Institute's Inter-American dialogue on the 30th anniversary of the 1988 Chilean plebiscite, which paved the way for the end of Augusto Pinochet's dictatorship and the return to democracy in Chile. The panel included both Pinochet's supporters and opponents who recalled and discussed the historic "NO" campaign, which ultimately led to Pinochet's defeat in the referendum and Chile's successful transition to democracy. Along with Walker, members of the historic panel included Andrés Allamand - Senator of Chile, Eugenio Tiron - Executive President of Tironi Associates, Rev. Timothy R. Scully - Professor of Political Science and Hacket Family Director of the Institute for Educational Initiatives, and J. Samuel Valenzuela - Professor of Sociology, University of Notre Dame.

== Publications ==
- 2020 -- Cristianos sin Cristiandad: (reflexiones de un legislador católico)
- 2018 -- La Nueva Mayoría. Reflexiones sobre una derrota
- 2018 -- Democracia Cristiana que queremos: El chile que soñamos
- 2016 -- Democracy in Latin America: Between Hope and Despair (Kellogg Institute Series on Democracy and Development)
- 2009 -- La Democracia En América Latina
- 2006 -- Chile and Latin America in a Globalized World
- 1990 -- Socialismo Y Democracia: Chile Y Europa En Perspectiva Comparada
- 1986 -- Democracia En Chile; Doce Conferencias (with José A. Vieragallo, et al.)

== Awards ==
- 2005—Grand Cross of the Order of the Infante Dom Henrique -- Prince Henry the Navigator (November 22, 2005)
- 2004—Grand Cross of the Order of the Sun of Peru (December 10, 2004)
