= Ministry of Agriculture (Chile) =

- Ministerio de Agricultura
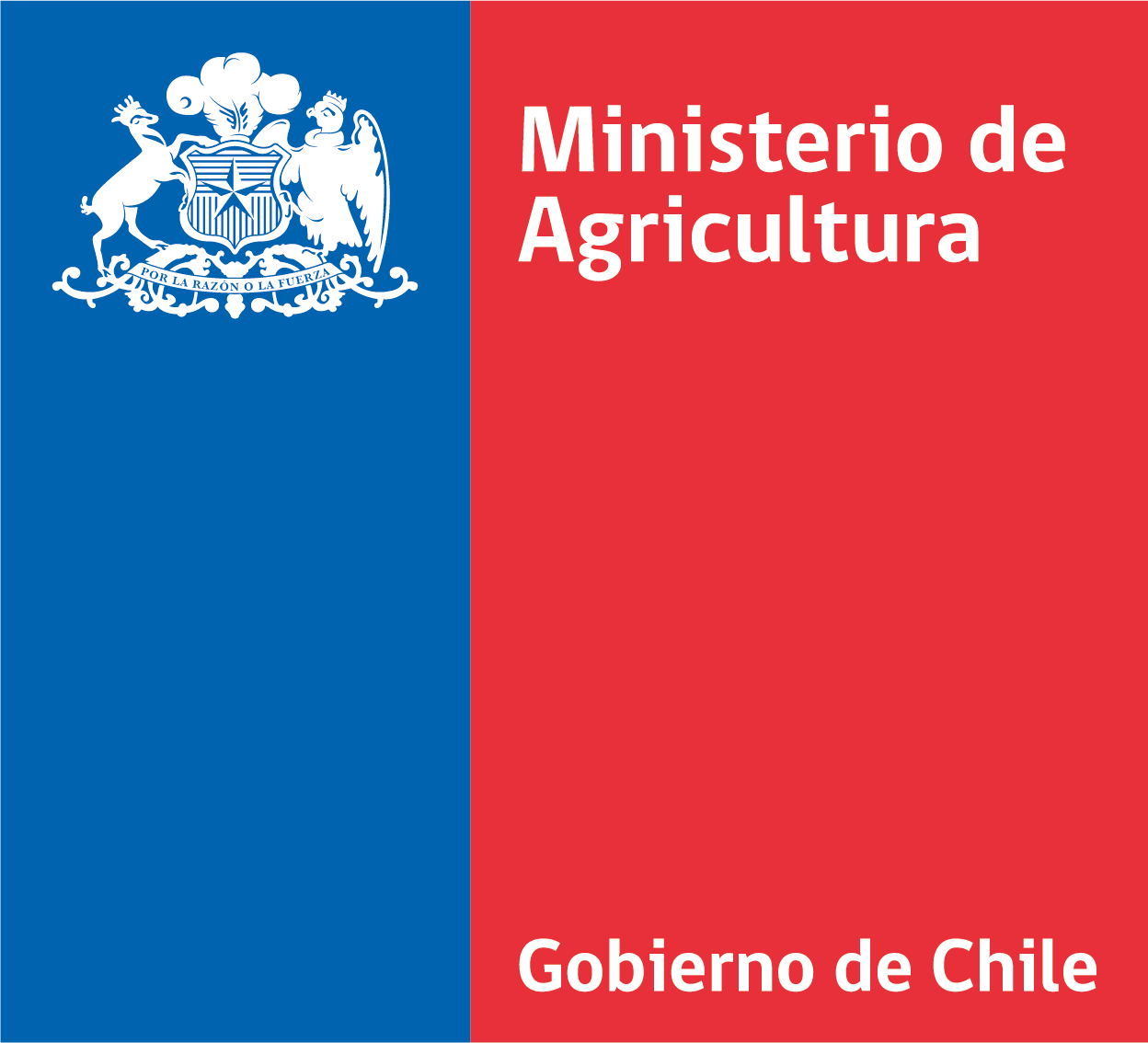
- Logo of the Ministry.

Ministry of Agriculture overview
- Formed: 17 October 1924 (as Ministry of Agriculture, Industry and Colonization); 5 December 1927 (98, as Ministry of Agriculture)
- Preceding Ministry of Agriculture: Ministry of Agriculture, Industry and Colonization (1924–1927)
- Jurisdiction: Chile
- Headquarters: Teatinos 40, Santiago
- Employees: 7,441 (2020)
- Annual budget: 563,808,891 thousand Chilean pesos (2020)
- Ministry of Agriculture executives: Jaime Campos, Minister of Agriculture; Francesco Venezian, Undersecretary of Agriculture
- Parent department: Executive Branch
- Parent Ministry of Agriculture: Presidency of the Republic
- Child Ministry of Agriculture: Undersecretariat of Agriculture INDAP SAG CONAF ODEPA CNR FIA INIA INFOR CIREN FUCOA AGROSEGUROS ACHIPIA IREN (1964–2004)
- Website: minagri.gob.cl

The Ministry of Agriculture (also known by its acronym, Minagri) is the ministry of State in charge of agriculture and livestock in Chile. Since 11 March 2026, its head has been the lawyer Jaime Campos, who serves as minister of the portfolio under the administration of José Antonio Kast.

It was created during the first government of Arturo Alessandri in 1924, under the name "Ministry of Agriculture, Industry and Colonization", acquiring its current designation in 1930, during the first administration of Carlos Ibáñez del Campo.

== History ==
During the 19th century the Chilean agricultural institutional framework — at that time responsible for matters such as the protection and development of agriculture, the organization and maintenance of agricultural schools, and the regulation of forests — was located in the Ministry of Finance, and from 1887, following a reform under the government of José Manuel Balmaceda, in the Ministry of Industry and Public Works.

It was only from the 1920s that the sector began to be endowed with its own institutional framework, due to its importance to the country, with the creation in 1924 — by the Military Junta led by General Luis Altamirano — of the Ministry of Agriculture, Industry and Colonization. The new ministry was responsible, among other functions, for the protection of the agricultural industry, the organization and maintenance of agricultural education, the promotion and conservation of forests and forest reserves, animal and plant health policing, and the promotion of agricultural credit, of cooperatives for the purchase or sale of seeds, machinery, and products, and in general everything related to the rural economy.

Three years later, the government of Carlos Ibáñez del Campo reorganized the State administration, so the agricultural institutional framework came under the Department of Agriculture of the new Ministry of Development. However, on 1 August 1930, Ibáñez himself returned autonomy to the sector, signing the decree that definitively created the Ministry of Agriculture. Thus, the new portfolio was composed of an undersecretariat and four departments: Arboriculture, Fruit Growing and Plant Health; Livestock and Animal Health; Oenology and Viticulture; and Rural Economy. It was also placed in charge of agricultural research laboratories, provincial agriculture services, agricultural schools, and the Quinta Normal of Agriculture. That same year, the Agricultural Export Board was also created, which would be succeeded in 1942 by the Institute of Agricultural Economics, while in 1932 the Agrarian Credit Bank — created in 1926 as a subsidiary of the Mortgage Credit Bank — became autonomous, and would therefore also relate to the State through the Ministry of Agriculture.

In 1953, the second government of Carlos Ibáñez del Campo restructured the ministry, which entailed the establishment of eight departments, the abolition of bodies such as the Epizootics Council, the Agricultural Plan Council and the National Commission for the Protection of Wildlife, and the transfer to Agriculture of services that depended on the Institute of Agricultural Economics and on the Ministry of Economy, including the Department of Fisheries and Hunting — which was renamed General Directorate of Fisheries and Hunting —, so that from that year on, fisheries institutions were left in the hands of the Ministry of Agriculture. Subsequently, in 1957, Fisheries and Hunting was merged with the National Directorate of Agriculture and the new body was named General Directorate of Agricultural and Fisheries Production, composed of eight departments, including the Department for the Promotion of Fisheries and Hunting. In 1960 the General Directorate was once again reformulated, and this time renamed the Directorate of Agriculture and Fisheries.

The agrarian reform process that began in the first years of the 1960s, and which would extend until 1973, led to the creation of new institutions dependent on or related to the Ministry of Agriculture. The first agrarian reform law (Law 15,020, pejoratively known as the "flowerpot law"), enacted in 1962 by President Jorge Alessandri, created the Higher Council for Agricultural and Livestock Development (Confsa), the Agrarian Reform Corporation (CORA) — successor to the Agricultural Colonization Bank, which was linked to the Ministry of Lands and Colonization — and the Agricultural Development Institute (Indap) — successor to the Agricultural Development and Research Council, created in 1953 —. Meanwhile, two years later the Agricultural Research Institute (INIA) was created.

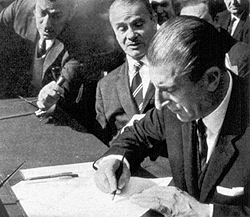
Minister of Agriculture Hugo Trivelli (center), alongside President Eduardo Frei Montalva signing the promulgating decree of the Agrarian Reform Law, 1967.

Subsequently, the 1967 agrarian reform (Law 16,640) enacted by Eduardo Frei Montalva — broader and deeper than the one carried out by Jorge Alessandri — created the National Agrarian Council, the National Agricultural Credit Council, the Office of Agricultural Planning (successor to Confsa), and the Agricultural and Livestock Service (successor to the Directorate of Agriculture and Fisheries). In 1970, toward the end of the Frei government, the Reforestation Corporation was also created, which in 1973 would change its name to National Forestry Corporation (Conaf).

Following the coup d'état of 11 September 1973 that overthrew Salvador Allende, the military dictatorship carried out several transformations in the Ministry. The halt to the agrarian reform process — the vast majority of expropriated lands were returned or auctioned off by the State — resulted in the dissolution of the Agrarian Reform Corporation in 1978 and its replacement by the Agrarian Normalization Office (Odena), whose purpose was to conclude the activities of CORA; in 1989, meanwhile, the Office of Agricultural Planning was terminated and any law or regulation referring to agrarian reform was finally repealed. Also, between 1976 and 1978, fisheries institutions were returned to the Ministry of Economy and the Undersecretariat of Fisheries and the National Fisheries and Aquaculture Service were created, while agencies such as Conaf, SAG and Indap were subject to restructuring in terms of composition and functions.

== Functions ==
One of the Ministry's stated objectives is to "reduce social inequality by strengthening and expanding the reach of development instruments, with priority for family and peasant agriculture". Another fundamental task is to contribute to value-adding in agriculture, which implies "promoting a development of the agricultural economy based both on technology and innovation, and on deepening the attributes that enhance the productivity and competitiveness of agriculture: the quality, safety, and health of silvoagricultural production". At the same time, this development gives appropriate priority to the protection of rural workers, communities, culture, and the country's natural resources.

== Dependencies ==
=== Undersecretariat of Agriculture ===
The Undersecretary of Agriculture is the second authority within the ministry in hierarchical terms. The position is currently held by Ignacia Fernández Gatica.

=== Agencies under Minagri ===
The following public agencies or services report to the Ministry of Agriculture:

- Agricultural Development Institute (INDAP)
- Agricultural and Livestock Service (SAG)
- National Forestry Corporation (CONAF)
- Office of Agricultural Studies and Policies (ODEPA)
- National Irrigation Commission (CNR)
- Foundation for Agricultural Innovation (FIA)
- Agricultural Research Institute (INIA)
- Forestry Institute of Chile (INFOR)
- Natural Resources Information Center (CIREN)
- Foundation for Communications, Training and Culture of Agriculture (FUCOA)
- Agroseguros
- Chilean Agency for Food Quality and Safety (ACHIPIA)

== List of representatives ==
Minister	Party	Term start	Term end	President
Hugo Trivelli	DC	3 November 1964	3 November 1970	Eduardo Frei Montalva
Jacques Chonchol	MAPU	3 November 1970	2 November 1972	Salvador Allende
Rolando Calderón	PS	2 November 1972	27 January 1973	Salvador Allende
Pedro Hidalgo Ramírez	PS	27 January 1973	3 June 1973	Salvador Allende
Ernesto Torrealba	PS	5 July 1973	13 July 1973	Salvador Allende
Jaime Tohá	Independent	13 June 1973	11 September 1973	Salvador Allende
Sergio Crespo	Militar	12 September 1973	11 July 1974	Augusto Pinochet
Tucapel Vallejos	Militar	11 July 1974	12 July 1976	Augusto Pinochet
Mario Mac-Kay	Militar	12 July 1976	20 April 1978	Augusto Pinochet
Alfonso Márquez de la Plata	Independent	20 April 1978	29 December 1980	Augusto Pinochet
José Luis Toro Hevia	Militar	29 December 1980	22 April 1982	Augusto Pinochet
Jorge Prado Aranguiz	Independent	22 April 1982	6 October 1988	Augusto Pinochet
Jaime de la Sotta	Independent	6 October 1988	5 June 1989	Augusto Pinochet
Juan Ignacio Domínguez	Independent	5 June 1989	11 March 1990	Augusto Pinochet
Juan Agustín Figueroa	PR	11 March 1990	11 March 1994	Patricio Aylwin
Emiliano Ortega	DC	11 March 1994	28 September 1996	Eduardo Frei Ruíz-Tagle
Carlos Mladinic	DC	28 September 1996	22 June 1999	Eduardo Frei Ruíz-Tagle
Ángel Sartori	DC	21 October 1988	11 March 1990	Eduardo Frei Ruíz-Tagle
Jaime Campos	PRSD	11 March 2000	11 March 2006	Ricardo Lagos
Álvaro Rojas	DC	11 March 2006	10 January 2008	Michelle Bachelet
Marigen Hornkohl	DC	10 January 2008	11 March 2010	Michelle Bachelet
José Antonio Galilea	RN	11 March 2010	29 December 2011	Sebastián Piñera
Luis Mayol	RN	29 December 2011	11 March 2014	Sebastián Piñera
Carlos Furche	PS	11 March 2014	11 March 2018	Michelle Bachelet
Antonio Walker	Independent	11 March 2018	6 January 2021	Sebastián Piñera
María Emilia Undurraga	Evópoli	6 January 2021	11 March 2022	Sebastián Piñera
Esteban Valenzuela	FREVS	11 March 2022	21 August 2025	Gabriel Boric
Ignacia Fernández	PS	21 August 2025	11 March 2026	Gabriel Boric
Jaime Campos	PR	11 March 2026	Incumbent	José Antonio Kast

== See also ==
- Agriculture in Chile
- Aquaculture in Chile
