= Alfonso Márquez de la Plata =

Chilean writer, politician and businessman (1933–2014)

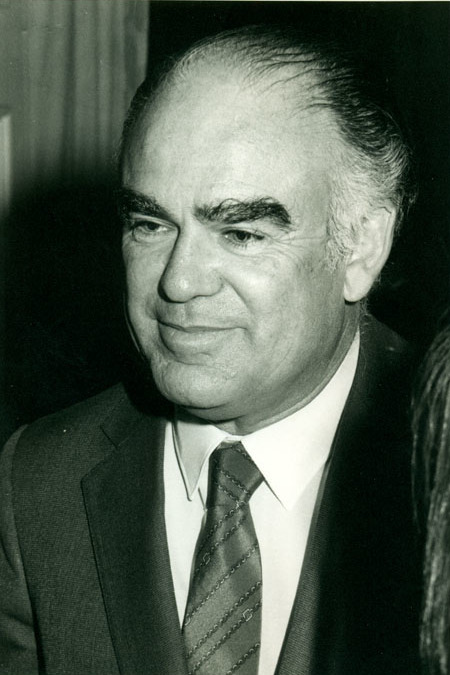

Minister of Agriculture
- In office 20 April 1977 – 29 December 1980
- President: Augusto Pinochet
- Preceded by: Mario Mac-Kay
- Succeeded by: José Luis Toro Hevia

Alfonso Márquez de la Plata Yrarrázaval (19 July 1933 – 22 April 2014) was a Chilean politician, businessman and writer. He was Minister of Agriculture from 1977 until 1980. He was later the Ministry General Secretariat of Government from 1983 to 1984. He was born in Santiago.

Márquez died from pneumonia on 22 April 2014 in Santiago. He was 80.
