= Pedro Muñoz Aburto =

Chilean politician

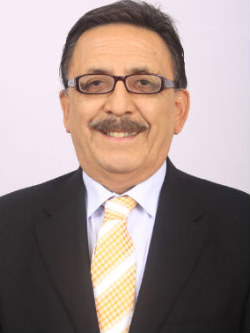

Member of the Senate
- In office 11 March 2006 – 11 March 2014
- Preceded by: José Ruiz de Giorgio
- Succeeded by: Carolina Goic
- Constituency: 19th Circumscription

Member of the Chamber of Deputies
- In office 11 March 1994 – 11 March 2006
- Preceded by: Carlos Smok
- Succeeded by: Carolina Goic
- Constituency: 60th District

Personal details
- Born: 1 July 1944 (age 82) Punta Arenas, Chile
- Party: Socialist Party
- Spouse: Amelia Urzúa
- Children: Two
- Education: University of Chile (LL.B)
- Occupation: Politician
- Profession: Economist

Pedro Héctor Muñoz Aburto (born 1 July 1944) is a Chilean politician who was a member of the Chamber of Deputies and the Senate of Chile.

He served as a Senator for the 19th Senatorial District, representing the Magallanes Region, between 2006 and 2014. Previously, he was a Member of the Chamber of Deputies for District No. 60 in the Magallanes Region, serving three consecutive terms between 1994 and 2006.

== Early life and education ==
Muñoz was born in Punta Arenas on 1 July 1944. He is the son of Pedro Muñoz Oyarzo and Lorenza Aburto Velásquez. He was married to Aurelia Rosa Urzúa González and is the father of two children.

He completed his primary and secondary education at the Liceo Salesiano San José of Punta Arenas. He later entered the Faculty of Law of the University of Chile in Valparaíso, where he obtained his law degree.

=== Professional career ===
In 1985, Muñoz founded the Punta Arenas Bar Association (Colegio de Abogados A.G.), where he served as a board member until 1987. He was also active as a political radio commentator, a panelist in public affairs forums, and a contributor to the newspaper La Prensa Austral.

He participated in the founding of the Carlos Lorca Cultural Center and was a member of the Cavirata Humanitarian Foundation and the Hogar de Cristo.

== Political career ==
Muñoz joined the Socialist Party of Chile in 1965. Following the 1973 military coup, he provided legal assistance in Valparaíso to numerous political prisoners tried by military courts. As a labor law specialist, between 1978 and 1990 he collaborated with the Vicariate of Solidarity and advised labor unions in the Magallanes Region. In 1980, he served as legal counsel to the Workers’ Pastoral of the Diocese of Punta Arenas. That same year, he worked at the Regional Secretariat of National Assets for a three-year period.

He later returned to the Magallanes Region and focused on rebuilding the Socialist Party. Between 1985 and 1989, he served two terms as regional secretary of the Almeyda faction of the Socialist Party. From 1986 to 1987, he was the official spokesperson and president of the Popular Democratic Movement (MDP) in Punta Arenas. The following year, he became president of the United Left in the city and chaired the regional Concertación de Partidos por el No, also serving as campaign manager for the 1989 parliamentary and presidential elections.

Between 1990 and 1993, during the administration of President Patricio Aylwin, Muñoz served as Regional Ministerial Secretary of Labor for the Twelfth Region. From 1991 to 1992, he also acted as acting Regional Secretary of National Assets. Concurrently, between 1990 and 1992, he was elected president of the Unified Socialist Party of the Twelfth Region and became a member of the party’s Central Committee.

Muñoz was elected deputy for District No. 60 in the Magallanes Region in three consecutive parliamentary elections, serving from 1994 to 2006. In 2006, he was elected senator for the 19th Senatorial District (Magallanes Region), serving until 2014.
