= List of ministries of Chile =

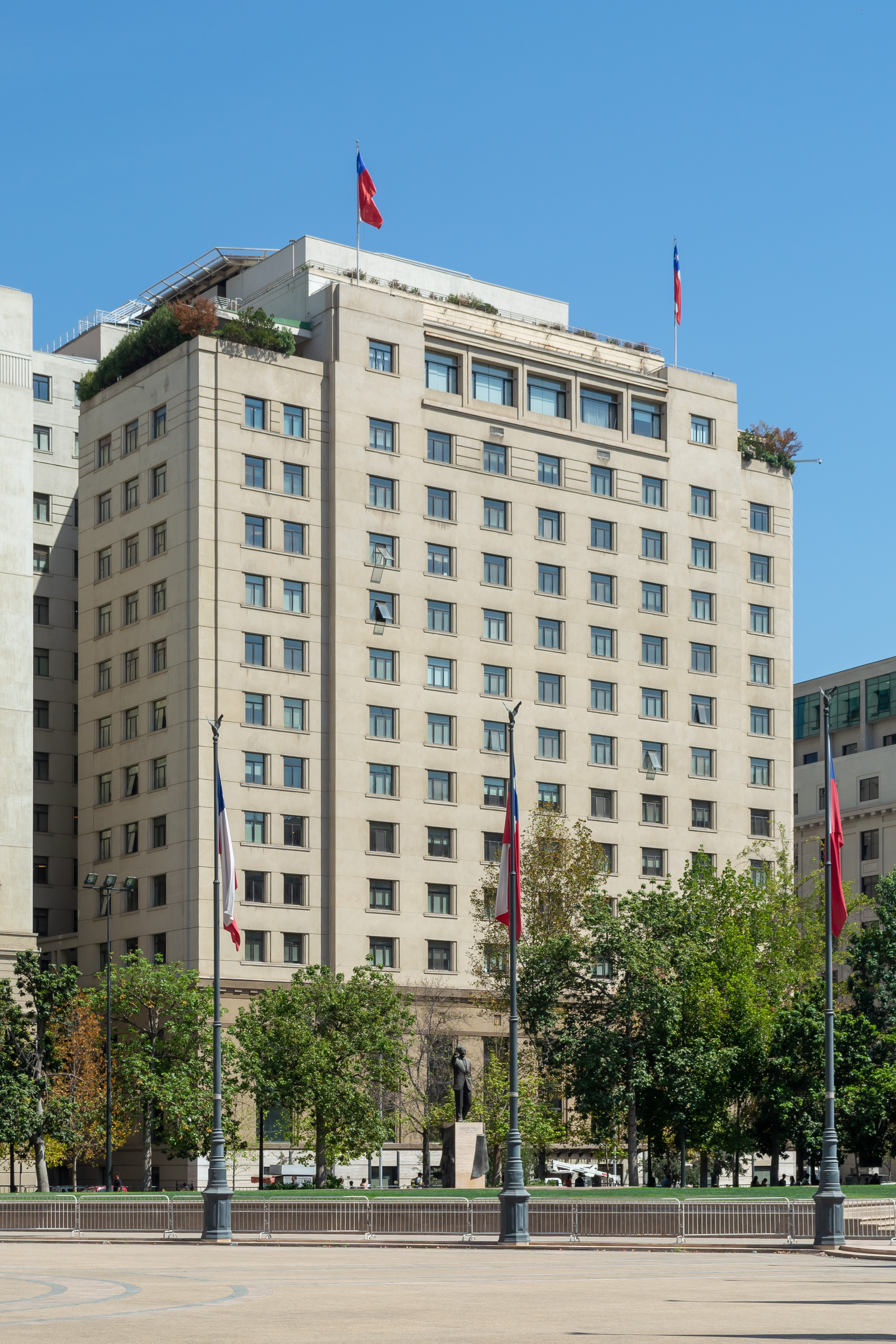
José Miguel Carrera Building, headquarters of the Ministry of Foreign Affairs

The ministers of state of Chile (Spanish: ministros de estado de Chile), according to the Chilean constitution, are the direct and immediate collaborators of the president of the Republic in the government and the administration of the state, and in such, they are responsible for the handling of their respective ministry (ministerio), in accordance with the policies and instructions that it imparts. The president can appoint and remove ministers freely, and each reports to directly to the president.

== List of ministries and their ministers ==
| Government ministry | Incumbent minister |
|---|---|
| Ministry of the Interior Ministerio de Gobierno (1817–1818) Ministerio de Gobierno y Relaciones Exteriores (1818–1824) Ministerio de Interior y Relaciones Exteriores (1824–1871) Ministerio del Interior (1871–2011) Ministerio del Interior y Seguridad Pública (2011-2025) Ministerio del Interior (2025-present) | Claudio Alvarado (2026) |
| Ministry of Foreign Affairs Ministerio de Relaciones Exteriores y Colonización (1871–1887) Ministerio de Relaciones Exteriores, Culto y Colonización (1888–1924) Ministerio de Relaciones Exteriores (1924–1930) Ministerio de Relaciones Exteriores y Comercio (1930–1941) Ministerio de Relaciones Exteriores (1941–present) | Francisco Pérez Mackenna (2026) |
| Ministry of National Defense Ministerio de Guerra (1817–1818) Ministerio de Guerra y Marina (1818–1924) Ministerio de Guerra (1924–1927) y Ministerio de Marina (1924–1927) Ministerio de Defensa Nacional (1927) Ministerio de Guerra (1927–1932) y Ministerio de Marina (1927–1932) Ministerio de Guerra y Aviación (1932) y Ministerio de Marina (1932) Ministerio de Defensa Nacional (1932–present) | Fernando Barros (2026) |
| Ministry of Finance Ministerio de Hacienda (1817–present) | Jorge Quiroz (2026) |
| Ministry General Secretariat of the Presidency Ministerio Secretaría General de la Presidencia (1990–present) | José García Ruminot (2026) |
| Ministry General Secretariat of Government Ministerio Secretaría General de Gobierno (1976–present) | Claudio Alvarado (2026) |
| Ministry of Economy, Development and Tourism Ministerio de Comercio y Abastecimiento (1941–1942) Ministerio de Economía y Comercio (1942–1953) Ministerio de Economía (1953–1960) Ministerio de Economía, Fomento y Reconstrucción (1960–2010 ) Ministerio de Economía, Fomento y Turismo (2010–present) | Daniel Mas (2026) |
| Ministry of Social Development and Family Ministerio de Planificación y Cooperación (1990–2011) Ministerio de Desarrollo Social (2011–2019) Ministerio de Desarrollo Social y Familia (2019–present) | María Jesús Wulf (2026) |
| Ministry of Education Ministerio de Educación Pública (1927–1990) Ministerio de Educación (1990–present) | María Paz Arzola (2026) |
| Ministry of Justice and Human Rights Ministerio de Justicia, Culto e Instrucción Pública (1837–1887) Ministerio de Justicia e Instrucción Pública (1887–1927) Ministerio de Justicia (1927–2016) Ministerio de Justicia y Derechos Humanos (2016-present) | Fernando Rabat (2026) |
| Ministry of Labor and Social Welfare Ministerio del Trabajo y Previsión Social (1959–present) | Tomás Rau (2026) |
| Ministry of Public Works Ministerio de Industria y Obras Públicas (1887–1912) Ministerio de Industria, Obras Públicas y Ferrocarriles (1910–1924) Ministerio de Obras y Vías Públicas (1924–1925) Ministerio de Obras Públicas, Comercio y Vías de Comunicación (1925–1927) Ministerio de Fomento (1927–1942) Ministerio de Obras Públicas y Vías de Comunicación (1942–1953) Ministerio de Obras Públicas (1953–1967) Ministerio de Obras Públicas y Transporte (1967–1974) Ministerio de Obras Públicas (1974–present) | Louis de Grange (2026) |
| Ministry of Health Ministerio de Higiene, Asistencia, Previsión Social y Trabajo (1924–1927) Ministerio de Bienestar Social (1927–1932) Ministerio de Salubridad Pública (1932–1936) Ministerio de Salubridad, Previsión y Asistencia Social (1936–1953) Ministerio de Salud Pública y Previsión (1953–1959) Ministerio de Salud Pública (1959–1979) Ministerio de Salud (1979–present) | May Chomalí (2026) |
| Ministry of Housing and Urban Planning Ministerio de Vivienda y Urbanismo (1965–present) | Iván Poduje (2026) |
| Ministry of Agriculture Ministerio de Agricultura, Industria y Colonización (1924–1927) Ministerio de Agricultura (1930–present) | Jaime Campos (2026) |
| Ministry of Mining Ministerio de Minas (1953) Ministerio de Minería (1953–present) | Daniel Mas (2026) |
| Ministry of Transport and Telecommunications Ministerio de Transportes (1974–1977) Ministerio de Transportes y Telecomunicaciones (1977–present) | Louis de Grange (2026) |
| Ministry of National Assets Ministerio de la Propiedad Austral (1929–1932) Ministerio de Tierras y Colonización (1932–1980) Ministerio de Bienes Nacionales (1980–present) | Catalina Parot (2026) |
| Ministry of Energy Ministerio de Energía (2010–present) | Ximena Rincón (2026) |
| Ministry of the Environment Ministerio del Medio Ambiente (2010–present) | Francisca Toledo (2026) |
| Ministry of Women and Gender Equality Servicio Nacional de la Mujer (1991-2016) Ministerio de la Mujer y la Equidad de Género (2016-present) | Judith Marín (2026) |
| Ministry of Sport Ministerio del Deporte (2013-present) | Natalia Duco (2026) |
| Ministry of Cultures, Arts and Heritage Consejo Nacional de la Cultura y las Artes de Chile (2001-2018) Ministerio de las Culturas, las Artes y el Patrimonio (2018-present) | Francisco Undurraga (2026) |
| Ministry of Science, Technology, Knowledge and Innovation Ministerio de Ciencia, Tecnología, Conocimiento e Innovación de Chile (2018-present) | Ximena Lincolao (2026) |
| Ministry of Public Security Ministerio de Seguridad Pública (2025-present) | Martín Arrau (2026) |

== Gallery ==
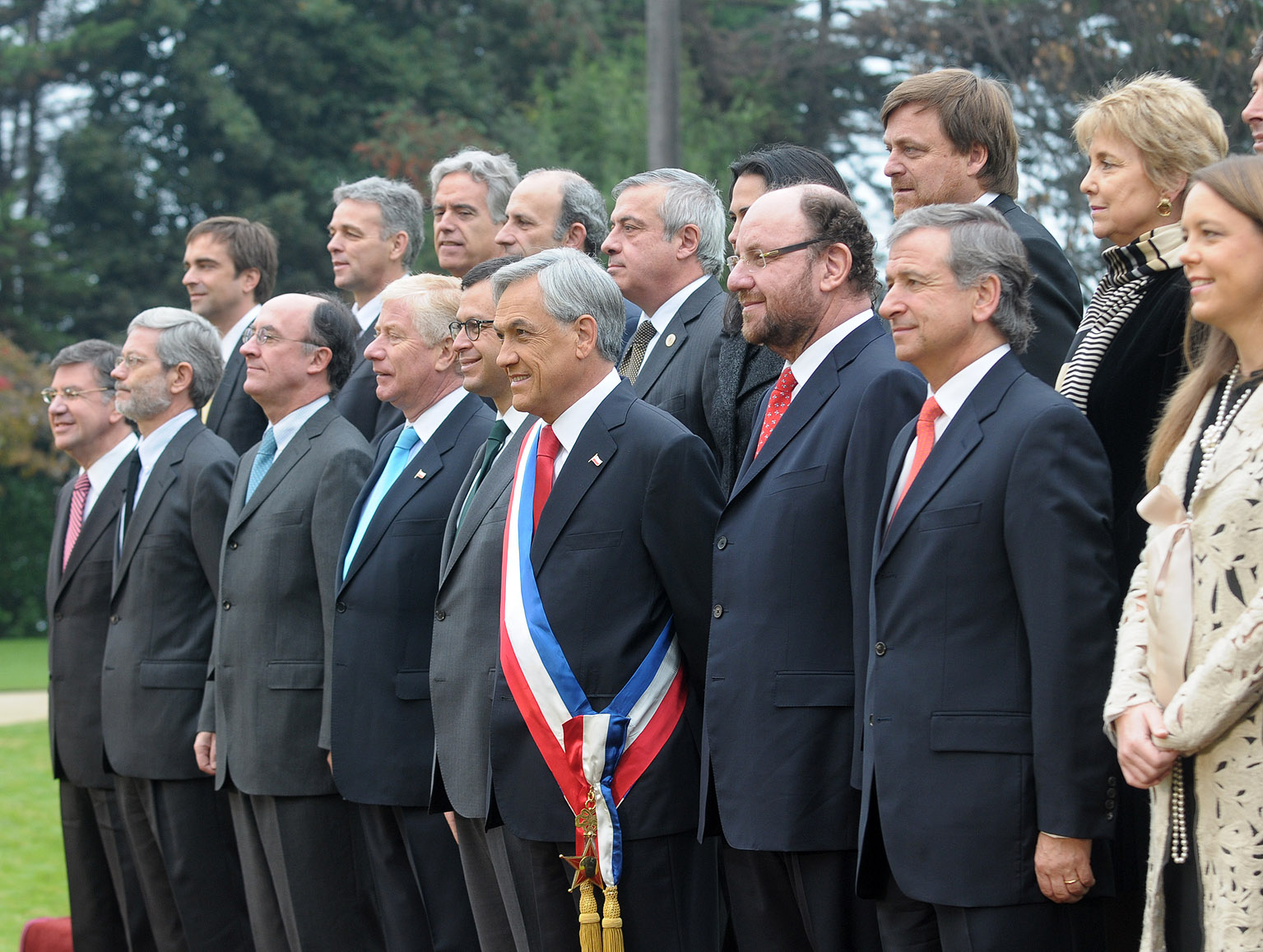
President Sebastián Piñera in the official photograph together with the Ministers of State. 21 May 2010.

== See also ==
- Ministry General Secretariat of Government (Chile)
- Ministry General Secretariat of the Presidency (Chile)
