= José Antonio Kast cabinet ministers =

Government ministers of Chile, from 2026

Kast Cabinet
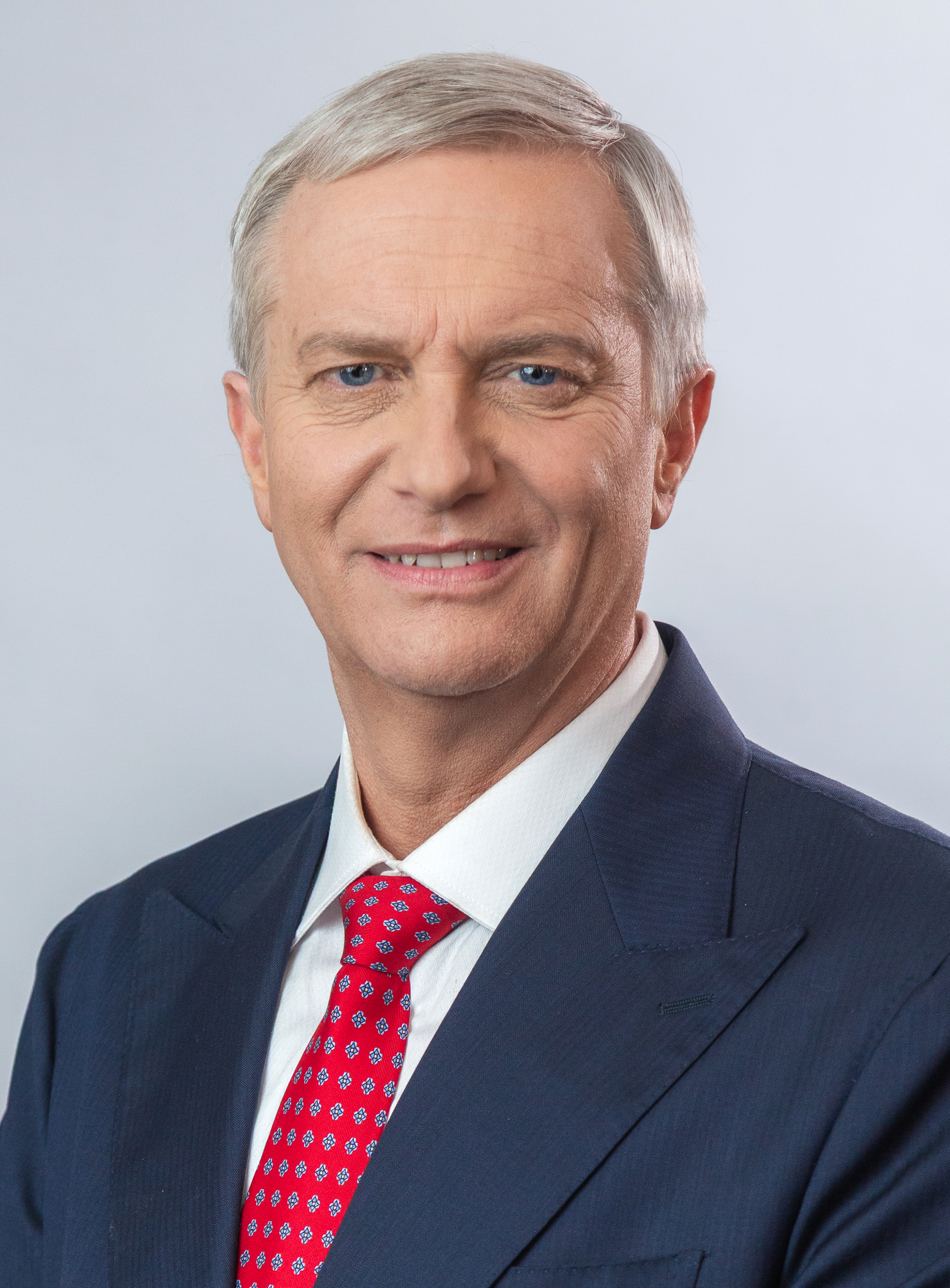
- Date formed: 11 March 2026

People and organisations
- Head of state: José Antonio Kast
- Head of government: José Antonio Kast

History
- Predecessor: Boric cabinet

The cabinet ministers of José Antonio Kast are the members of Chile's executive branch appointed to lead the ministries during his presidency, scheduled to begin on 11 March 2026.

Under the Constitution, the President of the Republic holds exclusive authority to appoint and remove cabinet ministers.

In January 2026, Kast announced the composition of his first cabinet, which included members from the Republican Party of Chile, figures associated with the Chile Vamos coalition—particularly the Independent Democratic Union (UDI) and National Renewal (RN)—as well as independent technocrats and policy specialists.

Political analysts described the cabinet as having a predominance of technical and managerial profiles over traditional partisan appointments, with a policy agenda focused on economic recovery, public security, and immigration control. Due to its ideological composition, commentators characterized it as the most right-wing Chilean cabinet since the end of the military government in 1990.

Several appointees had previously collaborated with Kast during his presidential campaigns. Economist Jorge Quiroz, who headed Kast's economic advisory team during the 2021 presidential election, was named Minister of Finance. Public security and immigration—both central themes of Kast's political platform—were reflected in the structure and priorities of the cabinet.

== Cabinet ==
The Kast Cabinet
Office	Name	Party	Term
President	José Antonio Kast	Ind.	11 March 2026–
Interior	Claudio Alvarado	UDI	11 March 2026–
Foreign Affairs	Francisco Pérez Mackenna	Ind.	11 March 2026–
Defense	Fernando Barros	Ind.	11 March 2026–
Finance	Jorge Quiroz	Ind.	11 March 2026–
Gen. Sec. of the Presidency	José García Ruminot	RN	11 March 2026–
Gen. Sec. of Government	Mara Sedini	Ind.	11 March 2026–19 May 2026
Claudio Alvarado	UDI	19 May 2026–
Economy, Development & Tourism	Daniel Mas	Ind.	11 March 2026–
Social Development & Family	María Jesús Wulf	REP	11 March 2026–
Education	María Paz Arzola	Ind.	11 March 2026–
Justice & Human; Rights	Fernando Rabat	Ind.	11 March 2026–
Labor & Social Welfare	Tomás Rau	Ind.	11 March 2026–
Public Works	Martín Arrau	REP	11 March 2026–19 May 2026
Louis de Grange	Ind.	19 May 2026–
Health	May Chomalí	Ind.	11 March 2026–
Housing & Urbanism	Iván Poduje	Ind.	11 March 2026–
Agriculture	Jaime Campos	PR	11 March 2026–
Mining	Daniel Mas	Ind.	11 March 2026–
Transport & Telecommunications	Louis de Grange	Ind.	11 March 2026–
National Assets	Catalina Parot	EVOP	11 March 2026–
Energy	Ximena Rincón	Ind.	11 March 2026–
Environment	Francisca Toledo	Ind.	11 March 2026–
Women & Gender; Equality	Judith Marín	PCC	11 March 2026–
Culture & the Arts	Francisco Undurraga	EVOP	11 March 2026–
Sports	Natalia Duco	Ind.	11 March 2026–14 August 2026
Francisco Riveros	Ind.	14 August 2026–
Science, Technology, Knowledge & Innovation	Ximena Lincolao	Ind.	11 March 2026–
Public Security	Trinidad Steinert	Ind.	11 March 2026–19 May 2026
Martín Arrau	REP	19 May 2026–
