= Víctor Ramos Muñoz =

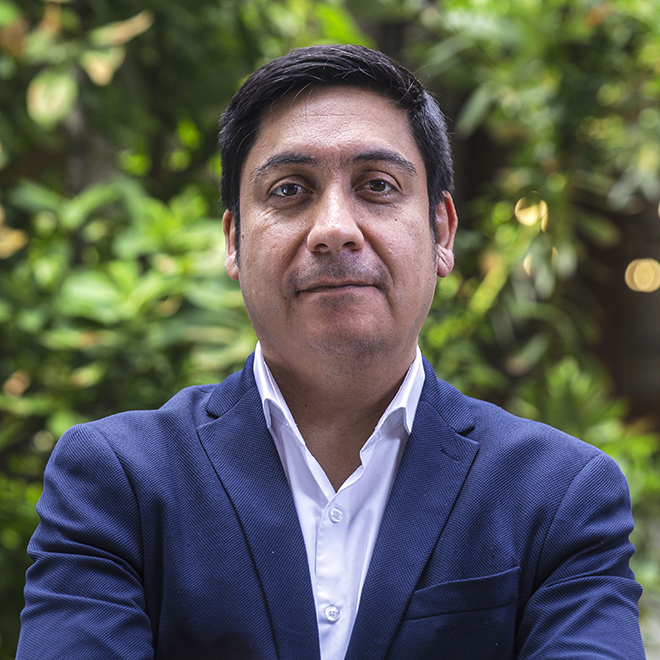
- Víctor Ramos in 2025

Undersecretary of the Interior of Chile
- In office 1 April 2025 – 9 March 2026
- President: Gabriel Boric
- Preceded by: Luis Cordero Vega
- Succeeded by: Máximo Pavez

Personal details
- Born: August 25, 1980 (age 45) Valparaíso, Chile
- Party: Broad Front (since 2024); Social Convergence (2018–2024)
- Education: University of Zaragoza; Alberto Hurtado University
- Alma mater: University of Viña del Mar

Víctor Manuel Ramos Muñoz (born 25 August 1980) is a Chilean psychologist and politician, affiliated with the Broad Front. Since 1 April 2025, he has served as Undersecretary of the Interior of Chile under the administration of President Gabriel Boric.

== Biography ==
Ramos was born in Valparaíso, Chile, and spent his childhood in various communes, including Talcahuano. He attended the Chilean-British School in Villa Alemana. While studying sociology, his education was interrupted when he had to travel to France for a year to finance his studies. He later earned a degree in psychology from the University of Viña del Mar. He also holds a master’s degree in Applied Social Studies and Development from the University of Zaragoza, and a master’s in Government, Public Policy and Territory from the Alberto Hurtado University.

He served as national coordinator of the Foundation for Overcoming Poverty, a role in which he visited regions including La Araucanía, contributing to pilot housing-related projects through the “Pequeñas localidades” ("Small Localities") program.

=== Political career ===
Ramos worked as Chief of Staff to deputy Diego Ibáñez during his first parliamentary term (2018–2022). He is considered part of Ibáñez’s inner circle, alongside Francisca Gallegos Jara, the Undersecretary of Social Services. Ramos was one of the founding members of Social Convergence, serving on its first central committee. He was also one of the few members of the party who supported then-deputy Gabriel Boric’s decision to sign the Agreement for Peace and a New Constitution in November 2019.

In April 2022, during the Boric administration, he joined the team of then-Minister of the Interior Izkia Siches as an advisor, helping design strategies to address the crisis in southern Chile. In June of that year, he was appointed national coordinator of the “Plan Buen Vivir” at the Ministry of the Interior and Public Security, and later served as Head of the Division for Social Promotion and Protection at the Ministry of Social Development and Family.

He also served as executive secretary of the Presidential Commission for Peace and Understanding, after being appointed presidential commissioner alongside former minister Ana Lya Uriarte.

On 1 April 2025, President Gabriel Boric appointed him as Undersecretary of the Interior, replacing Luis Cordero Vega, who became the first Minister of Public Security.
