= Presidency of José Antonio Kast =

Government of Chile, 2026–

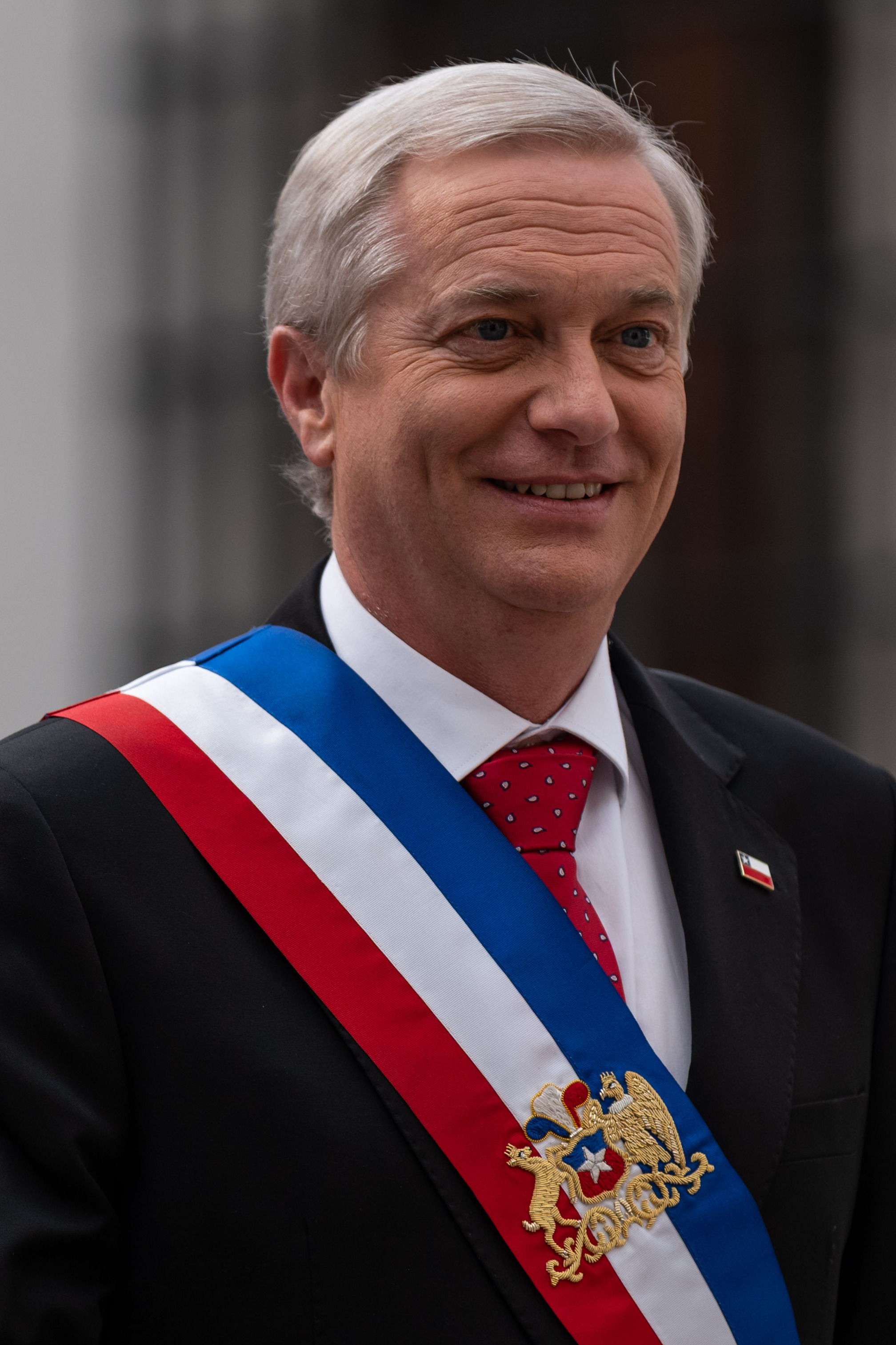
- Kast in 2026
- Presidency of José Antonio Kast; 11 March 2026 – present
- Cabinet: Full list
- Party: Independent (aligned with the Republican Party of Chile)
- Election: 2025
- Seat: La Moneda Palace
- Standard of the President

The presidency of José Antonio Kast is the current government administration in Chile, that began on 11 March 2026, following Kast's victory in the second round of the 2025 Chilean presidential election against Jeannette Jara. His term will extend until 11 March 2030, the date on which his successor must be inaugurated.

== Overview ==
The government of José Antonio Kast represents a shift to the right in Chilean politics, following the presidency of Gabriel Boric (2022–2026). In the runoff election held on 14 December 2025, he obtained more than 58% of the vote while carrying all sixteen regions, driven by public concerns about public safety, crime, irregular immigration, and economic recovery.

On 15 December 2025, Kast met with President Gabriel Boric at La Moneda Palace. On 5 January 2026, he was officially proclaimed president-elect by the Chilean Electoral Court (Tricel), the reading of the proclamation was carried out by the Tricel's reporting secretary, Carmen Gloria Valladares. Representatives of the Judiciary, the Electoral Service (Servel), the Constitutional Court, and the presidents of the Senate and the Chamber of Deputies, as well as presidents of various political parties, attended the proclamation ceremony.

== Oath of office ==
The change of command took place on 11 March 2026, in the Hall of Honor of the National Congress in Valparaíso. Back in Santiago, President Kast addressed his supporters from the balcony of La Moneda Palace.

== Cabinet ==
On 20 January 2026, the members of José Antonio Kast's cabinet were announced. The ministers took their posts on 11 March 2026, as part of the Chile Vamos coalition, the Republican Party, and independents. The cabinet consisted of 24 members, 11 of whom were women and 13 men. On 19 May, President Kast reshuffled the cabinet. The Minister of Public Security, Trinidad Steinert, and the Minister Secretary-General of the Government of Chile (Segegob) (Government Spokesperson), Mara Sedini, were replaced by the outgoing Minister of Public Works, Martín Arrau, while the Minister of the Interior, Claudio Alvarado, assumed the Spokesperson position. Louis de Grange was put in charge of Public Works in parallel to his duties as Minister of Transport.

== Economy ==
Video released on 24 March 2026 by official government social media accounts claiming that the state is bankrupt. The publication was deleted hours later, prompting an investigation by the Comptroller General.

On 9 March 2026, days after taking office, Finance Minister Jorge Quiroz announced a plan to reduce the budgets of all ministries by 3%. The measure aimed to reduce fiscal spending by US$6 billion.

On 23 March 2026, the government published a decree in the Official Gazette of Chile from the Ministry of Finance, headed by minister Jorge Quiroz, modifying the Fuel Price Stabilization Mechanism (MEPCO). The measure extended from two to four weeks the period used to calculate the import parity price of gasoline, diesel fuel, and vehicular liquefied petroleum gas, taking effect for prices established starting on Thursday, 26 March 2026.

As a mitigating measure, the government launched a plan called Chile Sale Adelante ("Chile Moves Forward"), which includes seven measures such as freezing public transport fares in Santiago until 31 December 2026, funds to contain price increases in the regions, a temporary reduction in kerosene prices, subsidies for taxis and collective taxis, and other targeted initiatives.

== Immigration ==
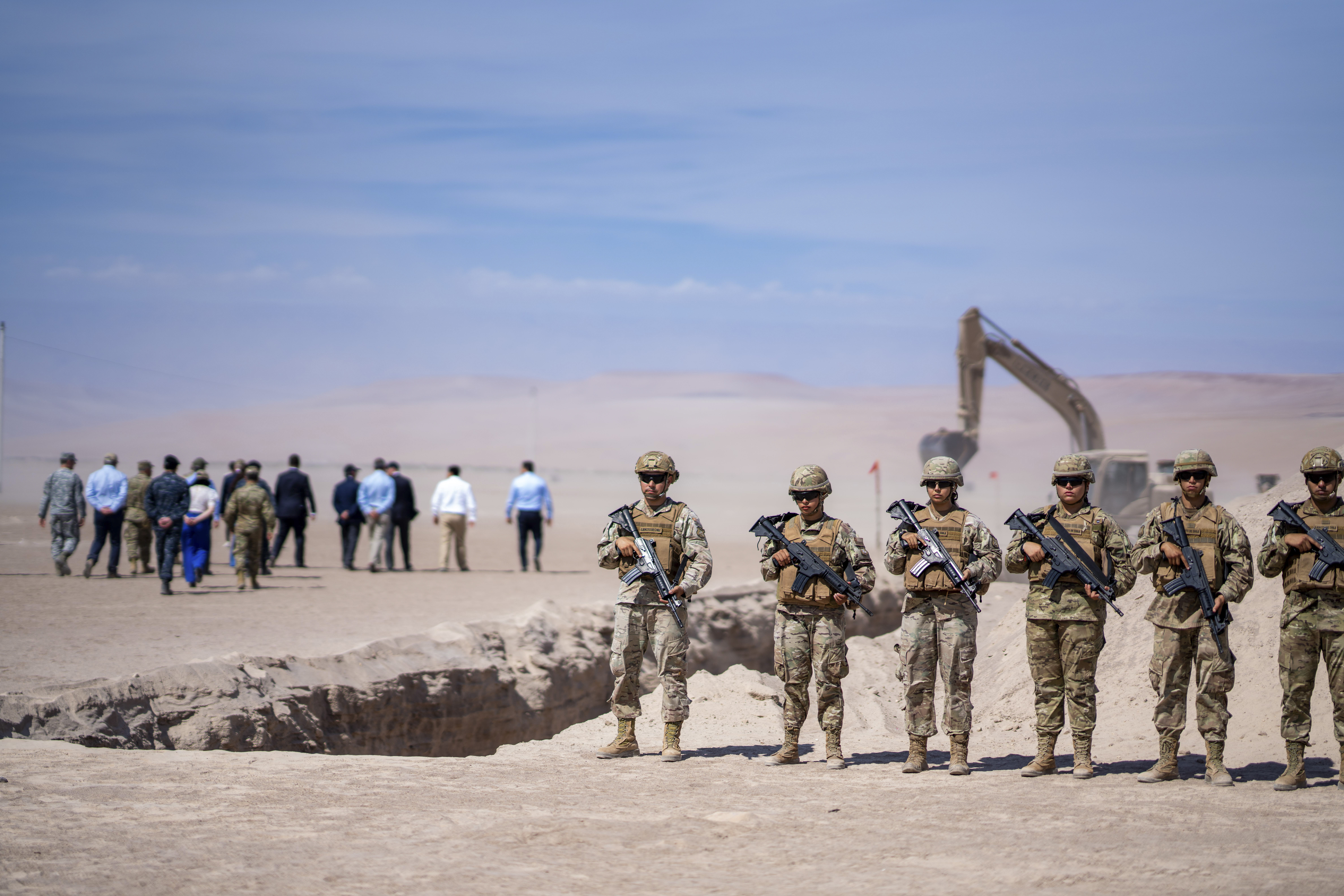
The "Border Shield" plan being implemented in Chacalluta, near the border with Peru.

The government of José Antonio Kast implemented the so-called "Border Shield Plan".

The government also proposed creating a joint task force of 3,000 members of the armed forces and Carabineros, granted full powers to detain, redirect, and immediately deport irregular migrants. A 10-kilometre exclusion zone was established in which any undocumented person may be automatically detained.

== Environment ==
The Kast administration withdrew 43 decrees issued by the previous administration in order to subject them to technical review. These decrees were pending before the Comptroller General and had not yet entered into force.

The first decree to be resubmitted after review and subsequently approved by the Comptroller concerned the protection of the Darwin's frog.

Kast stated in an interview that: "Chile must protect the environment, women, culture, flora and fauna. It is not incompatible or contradictory to protect everything and for Chile to become a developed country. But what matters most to us are people, the human factor."

== Foreign relations ==
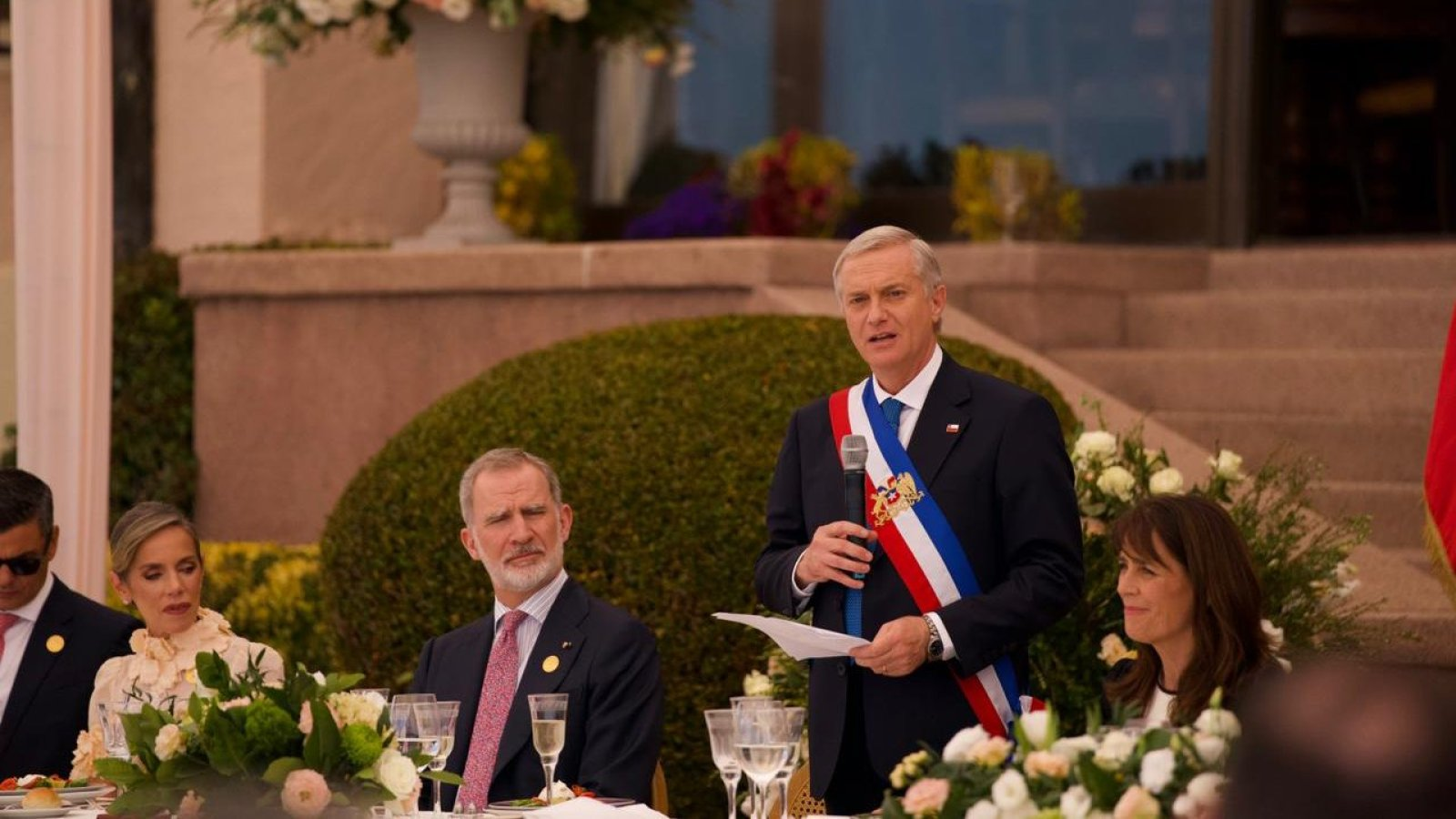
José Antonio Kast and First Lady María Pía Adriasola with King Felipe VI of Spain.

The Kast administration has sought closer relations with the United States while maintaining strong trade relations with China.

While still president-elect, Kast attended the multinational anti-narcotics summit known as the "Shield of the Americas", promoted by U.S. President Donald Trump.

The Chilean government withdrew its support for the candidacy of Michelle Bachelet for Secretary-General of the United Nations, stating that it would not spend public funds promoting her campaign and that it would neither support nor present another candidate. Mexico and Brazil continued to support her candidacy.

== Health ==
On 23 March 2026, President Kast alongside Health Minister May Chomali, signed the decree for the "Cancer Health Alert" to address waiting lists associated with cancer treatment. It consists of five measures, including giving health agencies the power to act faster, collaborating with the private health sector, streamlining the entire drug distribution chain, and establishing direct contact with patients to address pending cases. Shortly after a month had passed, the first report indicated that more than 20,000 pending cases had already been attended to.

== Approval ratings ==
By April 2026, Kast’s popularity declined in opinion polls, with his approval rating falling from 57% to 42%. In June 2026, his approval rating dropped to 34%, while his disapproval rating reached 52%. The drop in Kast's approval ratings have appeared to mirror his predecessor Boric's approval ratings in his first 100 days.

In August 2026, a poll from Criteria, a Santiago-based firm, found that Kast's approval rating was 35% while 52% disapproved. 47% of respondents said Chile is going backwards, compared with 33% who see things staying the same and just 20% who believe the country is advancing. 42% of respondents predicted the economy would worsen over the next six months. A separate survey by Cadem found 40% approval and 56% disapproval for Kast's government. Inflation, stagnant wages, and a perceived absence of bread-and-butter concerns appear to have driven the downward trend in Kast's approval.
