= Sebastián Figueroa =

Chilean politician

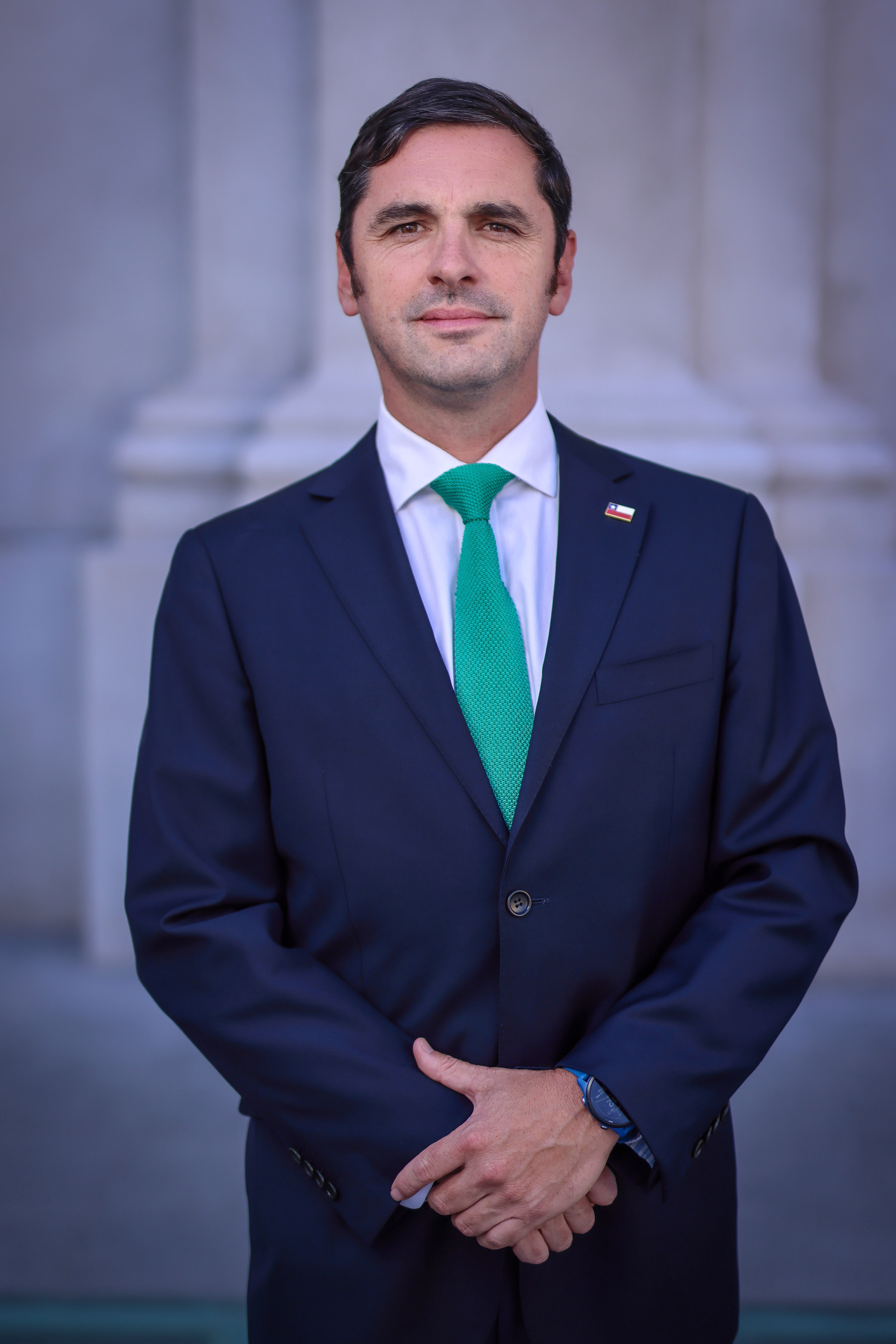
- Official portrait, 2026

Undersecretary of Regional and Administrative Development
- Incumbent
- Assumed office 11 March 2026
- President: José Antonio Kast
- Preceded by: Francisca Perales

Member of the Constitutional Council
- In office 7 June 2023 – 7 November 2023
- Constituency: 8th Circumscription

Personal details
- Born: Sebastián Alberto Figueroa Melo; 29 April 1983 (age 43) Santiago, Chile
- Party: Republican
- Spouse: Javiera Larraín Vaccarezza
- Children: Four
- Parent(s): Carlos Figueroa Vera; Lorena Melo
- Education: Pontifical Catholic University of Chile
- Occupation: Politician
- Profession: Business administrator

Sebastián Alberto Figueroa Melo (born 29 April 1983) is a Chilean business administrator and politician. He has served as Undersecretary of Regional and Administrative Development since 11 March 2026, during the presidency of José Antonio Kast. In 2023, he was a member of the Constitutional Council.

== Biography ==
Figueroa was born on 29 April 1983 in Santiago, Chile. He is the son of Carlos Figueroa Vera and Lorena Melo Castañón. He is married to Javiera Larraín Vacarezza, and they have four children.

Figueroa completed his primary and secondary education at Colegio Cumbres in Santiago, graduating in 2000. Between 2001 and 2006, he studied commercial engineering at the Pontifical Catholic University of Chile, where he later completed a Master’s in Business Administration (MBA) in 2015. During his university studies, he also served as director of the youth program at the Fundación Jaime Guzmán.

In the professional sphere, between 2009 and 2010 Figueroa worked as head of the municipal education administration department in the commune of Paine. From 2015 to 2020, he was metropolitan northern zone manager for the Asociación Chilena de Seguridad (ACHS), general manager of ESACHS, and human resources manager. He also served as director of the Corporación de Salud y Educación in Las Condes. Between 2020 and 2023, he was executive director of the Collaboration Center for Business of the Engineering Faculty at the Universidad del Desarrollo. He currently serves as executive director of the Action Republicana study center.

== Political career ==
Figueroa began his political trajectory during his university years, being elected president of the Movimiento Gremial at his university in 2006 and serving as secretary of the board of the Federación de Estudiantes de la Universidad Católica (FEUC). He is a member of the Republican Party of Chile.

On 15 March 2010, he was appointed Regional Ministerial Secretary (Seremi) of Education for the O'Higgins Region, a position he held until May 2011. He then served as chief of staff to the Undersecretary of Education until May 2013.

In the 2021 municipal elections, Figueroa ran as a candidate for councillor in the commune of Paine for the Republican Party within the Republicanos pact, but was not elected. In the elections of 7 May 2023, he ran for a seat on the Constitutional Council representing the Republican Party for the 8th Circumscription (O'Higgins Region). He was elected with 84,196 votes. As a member of the Constitutional Council, he was part of the Social Rights Commission.

On 11 March 2026, he took office as Undersecretary of Regional and Administrative Development, under José Antonio Kast's presidency.
