= Francisca Perales =

Chilean politician (born 1985)

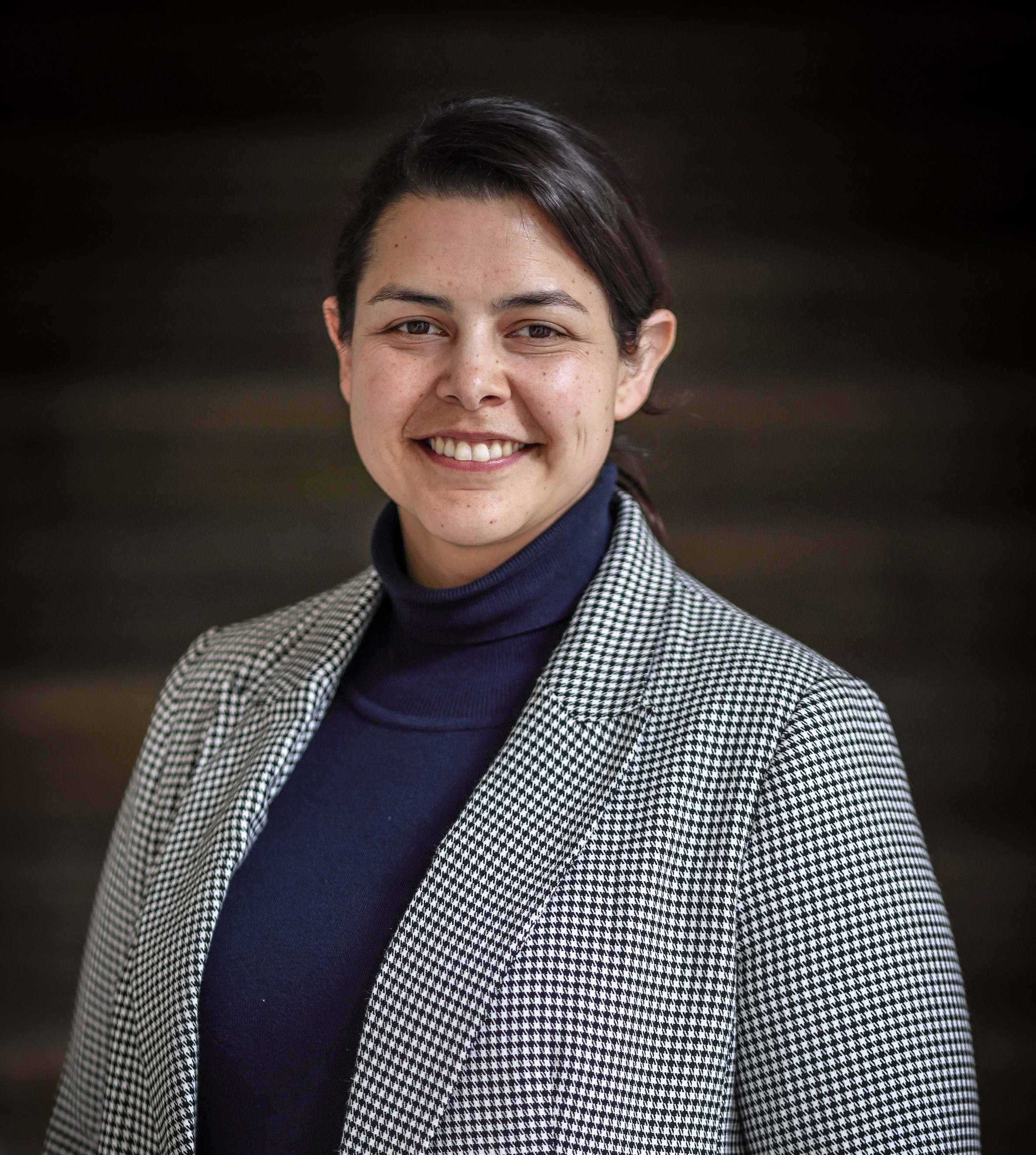
- Perales in 2023

Undersecretary of Regional and Administrative Development
- In office 11 March 2022 – 11 March 2026
- President: Gabriel Boric
- Preceded by: Nicolás Cataldo
- Succeeded by: Sebastián Figueroa

Undersecretary of Social Services
- In office 11 March 2022 – 16 August 2023
- Appointed by: Gabriel Boric
- Preceded by: Andrea Balladares
- Succeeded by: Francisca Gallegos

Personal details
- Born: 10 January 1985 (age 41) Vina del Mar, Chile
- Party: Social Convergence (CS)
- Other political affiliations: Autonomist Movement (MA)
- Education: Pontifical Catholic University of Valparaíso
- Profession: Civil Engineer

Francisca Perales Flores (born 10 January 1985) is a Chilean politician.
