= Undersecretariat of Public Security (Chile) =

- Subsecretaría de Seguridad Pública
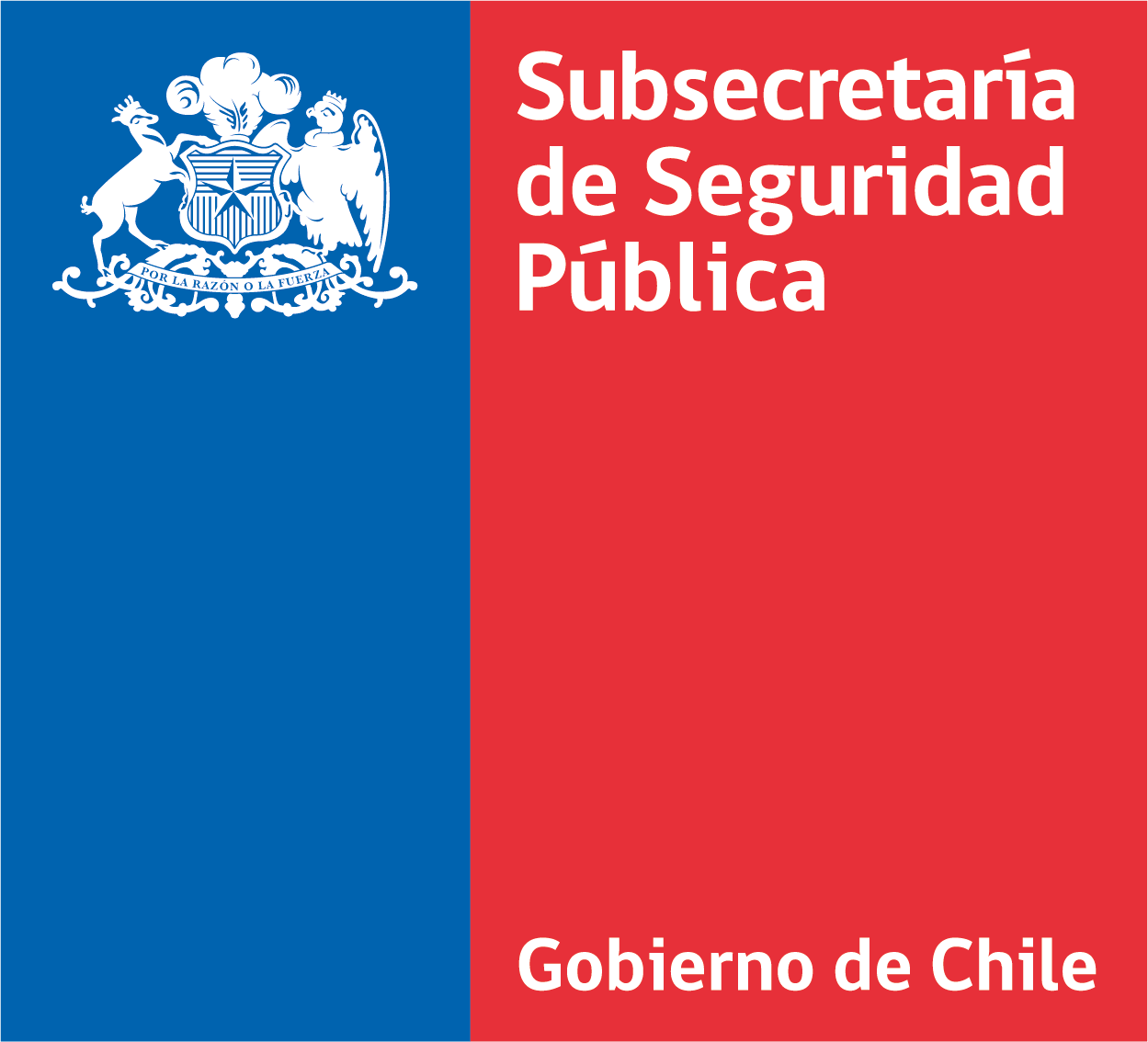
- Governmental logo.

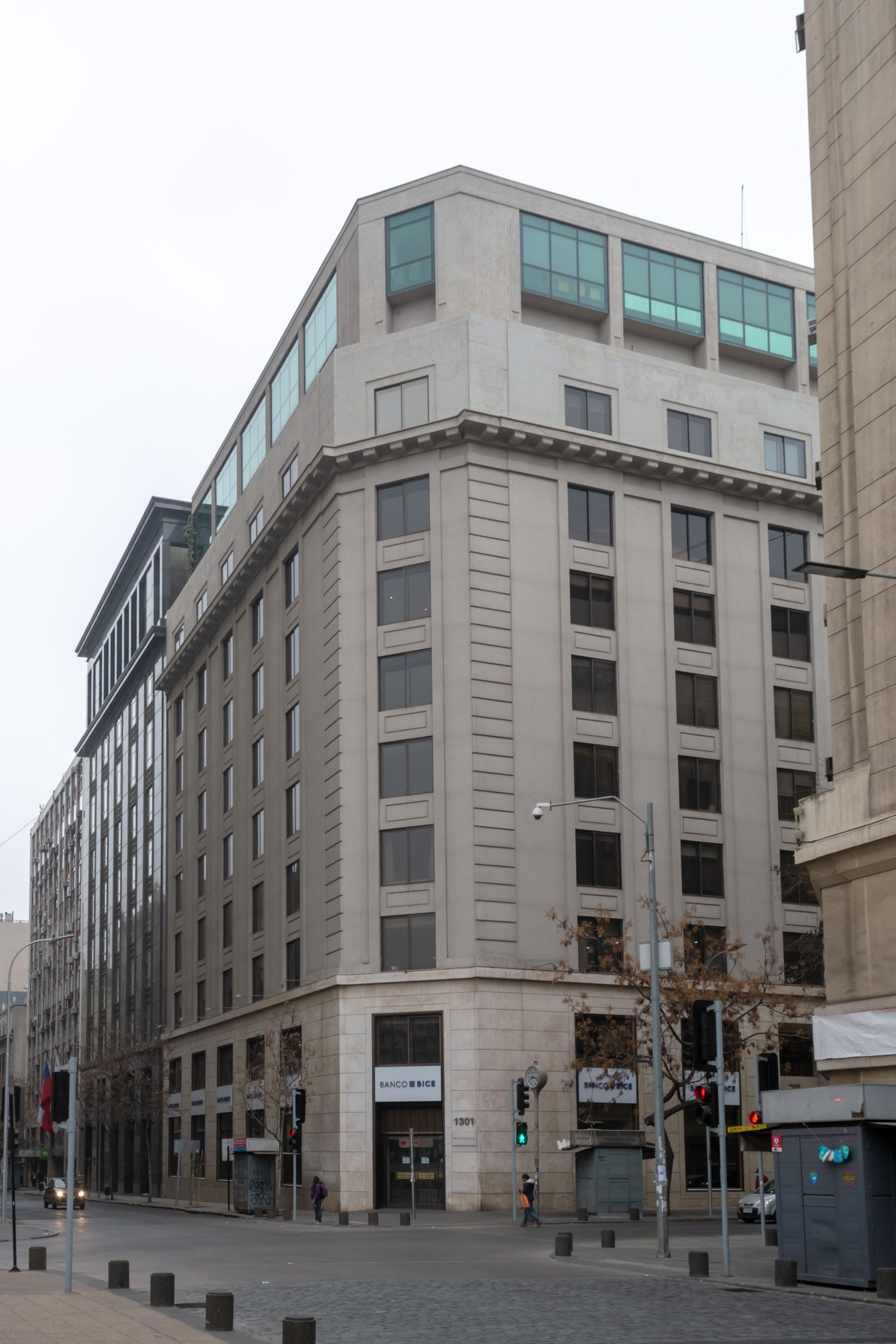
- Former offices of Banco BICE, headquarters of the Undersecretariat for Public Security.

Undersecretariat overview
- Formed: 1 April 2025
- Preceding Undersecretariat: Undersecretariat of the Interior (2011–2025)
- Type: Government undersecretariat
- Jurisdiction: Chile
- Status: Active
- Headquarters: Teatinos 220, Santiago, Chile
- Undersecretary responsible: Rafael Collado González, Undersecretary of Public Security
- Parent department: Ministry of Public Security

The Undersecretariat of Public Security (Spanish: Subsecretaría de Seguridad Pública) is a Chilean entity under the authority of the Ministry of Public Security that serves as the immediate advisory and executive body of the Minister in the design, coordination, implementation, and evaluation of public policies related to public security, public order, organized crime, among other matters, without prejudice to other powers delegated or entrusted by the Minister.

In addition, the Undersecretariat is the coordinating body responsible for exercising the functions and powers of the Ministry concerning the Chilean law enforcement forces (Fuerzas de Orden y Seguridad Pública). For this purpose, it oversees the management of all Ministry plans and programs related to these matters. It is also responsible for coordinating the actions carried out by other government agencies in this area, ensuring consistency and efficient use of public resources.

The Undersecretariat was established during the administration of President Gabriel Boric on 1 April 2025, through Law No. 21,730, which created the new Ministry of Public Security, separating responsibilities related to maintaining public order from the Ministry of the Interior.

== Functions ==
The Undersecretariat of Public Security holds a number of functions and powers:

- Design and propose to the Minister public policies, plans, and programs within its area of responsibility, as well as implement and evaluate them. The results of such evaluations must be submitted to the Minister, who may determine whether to continue, modify, or terminate the corresponding plans and programs.
- Coordinate the actions of ministries and public services related to matters within its competence.
- Enter into agreements or contracts with public or private institutions — including municipalities and regional governments — within the scope of their respective responsibilities.
- Advise and assist the Minister in exercising border protection duties.
- Advise and support the Minister in the formulation, design, and evaluation of national policies and strategies to prevent and combat national and transnational organized crime, drug trafficking, and terrorist acts. It will coordinate joint work with the National Intelligence Agency, law enforcement agencies, and other competent entities, and will submit its assessments for ministerial approval.
- Advise and support the Ministry in the oversight and supervision of the law enforcement agencies (Fuerzas de Orden y Seguridad Pública).
- Provide advice on cybersecurity matters falling under the Ministry's purview.
- Maintain the official registry established under Title V of Law No. 20,000, which replaced Law No. 19,366 on the penalization of illicit drug trafficking and the handling of psychotropic substances.
- Commission studies and research related to its functions and responsibilities.
- Provide ongoing training to Ministry personnel on topics within its jurisdiction.
- Request reports from any State administrative body on relevant matters, in accordance with Law No. 19,880, which establishes the framework for administrative procedures in public agencies.
- Cooperate with the Public Prosecutor's Office (Ministerio Público) in the coordination, design, and implementation of strategies that support criminal prosecution, respecting its autonomy and powers.
- Ensure public safety and order throughout the country and contribute to their restoration when necessary through interagency coordination, effective resource management, and collaboration across territorial levels.
- Collaborate with the Minister and the Undersecretariat for Crime Prevention in the design, implementation, oversight, coordination, updating, and evaluation of the National Public Security Policy. This includes coordinating sectoral and cross-sectoral actions.
- Manage and develop data processing systems and statistical reporting within its jurisdiction, and conduct analysis — in coordination with other government bodies — regarding the challenges and risks within the Ministry's scope of responsibility.
- Fulfill any other functions and powers granted by the Constitution and the law.

In addition, the Undersecretariat is tasked with overseeing personnel policies for the national law enforcement agencies, which must include measures for professional development and gender equality. It also prepares decrees, resolutions, ministerial orders, and official communications regarding appointments, promotions, retirements, resignations, overseas assignments, and all other administrative decisions related to the rights, benefits, and requests from active personnel, retirees, and their families.

== Structure ==
The following bodies report to the Undersecretariat:

- Regional Ministerial Secretariats of Public Security
  - Provincial Departments of Public Security

== List of Undersecretaries ==
Undersecretary		Start	End	Party	President
1	Rafael Collado	1 April 2025	11 March 2026	FA	Gabriel Boric
2	Andrés Jouannet	11 March 2026	2 June 2026	Ind.	José Antonio Kast
3	María Giannini	2 June 2026	Incumbent	Ind.	José Antonio Kast
