= Marcela Ríos =

Chilean politician

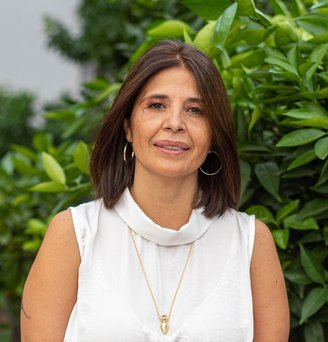
- Ríos in March 2022

Minister of Justice
- In office 11 March 2022 – 7 January 2023
- President: Gabriel Boric
- Preceded by: Hernán Larraín
- Succeeded by: Luis Cordero Vega

Personal details
- Born: 14 December 1966 (age 59) Santiago, Chile
- Party: Social Convergence
- Education: University of York (BA); Latin American Faculty of Social Sciences (MA); University of Wisconsin–Madison (PhD)
- Occupation: Politician
- Profession: Sociologist

Marcela Alejandra Ríos Tobar (born 14 December 1966) is a Chilean politician and sociologist who served as Chile's Minister of Justice from March 2022 to January 2023 when she resigned due to a controversy surrounding pardons for protesters.
