= Rodrigo Galilea =

Chilean politician (born 1973)

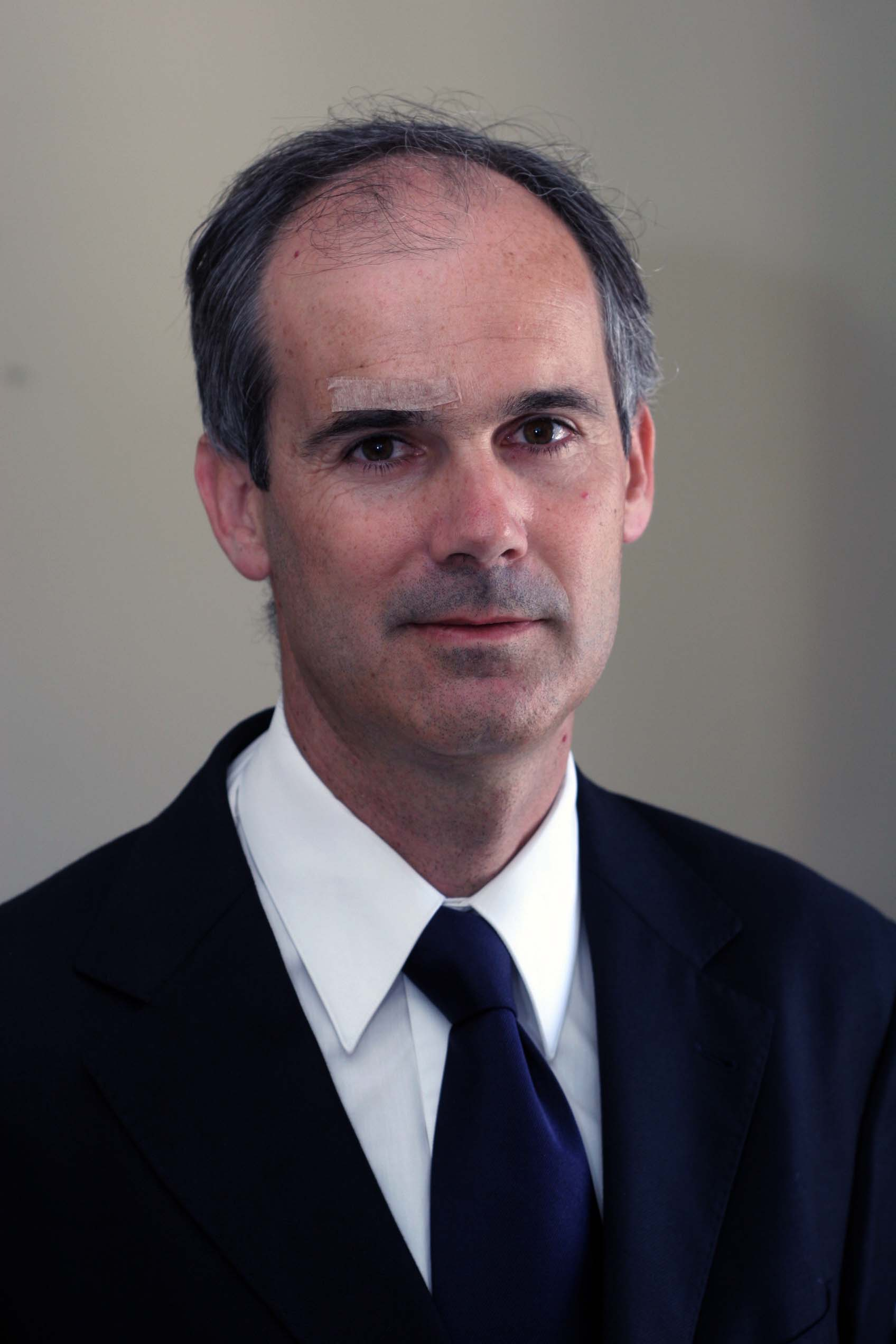

Renovación Nacional President
- Incumbent
- Assumed office 2023
- Preceded by: Francisco Chahuán

Member of the Senate
- In office 11 March 2018 – 11 March 2026
- Preceded by: Creation of the circunscription
- Succeeded by: Andrea Balladares
- Constituency: 9th Circunscription

Intendant of the Maule Region
- In office 11 March 2010 – 11 March 2014
- President: Sebastián Piñera
- Preceded by: Fernando Coloma Amaro
- Succeeded by: Hugo Veloso

Personal details
- Born: 3 November 1966 (age 59) Santiago, Chile
- Party: National Renewal
- Spouse: Pilar Vicuña
- Children: Five
- Parent(s): Víctor Galilea; Gloria Vial Rodríguez
- Education: Pontifical Catholic University of Chile (LL.B)
- Occupation: Politician
- Profession: Lawyer

Rodrigo Galilea Vial (born 19 July 1973) is a Chilean politician who currently serves as a member of the Senate of Chile. Similarly, he served as Intendant of the Maule Region.

Before his public career, he held roles primarily in corporate management at several private companies, performing typical tasks such as contracts review, regulatory compliance, legal advice on business operations, and potential internal or external litigation cases.

Galilea assumed the presidency of Renovación Nacional (RN) in 2023, after winning the party’s internal elections with 53% of the vote. His leadership has been marked by a pragmatic and consensus-oriented style, seeking agreements on key issues such as security and pensions.

Under his tenure, RN has consolidated itself as the country’s largest political party, with a notable recovery in mayoralties and regional governments. Although he has faced internal tensions, he has projected the party as a moderate force with a vocation for government.

== Biography ==
Son of Víctor Galilea Linares, former president of the Chilean Chamber of Construction (CChC), and Gloria Vial Rodríguez. He is the fifth of eleven siblings. Married to Pilar Vicuña Molina, Executive Director of the «Corporación Ven y Ayúdame». He is the father of five children.

He studied at Colegio Tabancura in Santiago and entered the Law School of the Pontifical Catholic University of Chile, where he graduated as a lawyer in 1990. He later took theology courses at the Catholic University of Maule.

In the private sector, he practiced his profession in companies such as Lucchetti S.A., Aguas San Pedro S.A., Agrícola El Volcán S.A., Aguas y Riles S.A., among others. In the educational field, he served as director of the management company of the Pumahue and Manquecura schools, as well as director of the English College of Talca. He was also linked to the CChC in the Maule Region.

He was part of Constructora Galilea until 2010, when he resigned from his position but remained a partner. This construction company was later questioned after, in 2023, residents of the Parque Zapallar neighborhood in Curicó were affected by the overflow of the Guaiquillo River in Curicó. Moreover, the company had reportedly been sanctioned in Peru at least 32 times due to complaints related to social housing.

== Political career ==
On March 11, 2010, he took office as Intendant of the Maule Region, a position he held until March 11, 2014, throughout Piñera’s administration. Upon assuming the post, he had to face the consequences of the earthquake and tsunami of February 27, 2010, in the area.

In March 2017, he announced his candidacy for senator for Maule. He ran under the Chile Vamos coalition, securing his seat after obtaining 28,268 votes, equivalent to 7.64% of the ballots. He assumed office on March 11, 2018.

=== Presidency of RN ===
In September 2023, it was announced Galilea's candidacy –alongside Andrea Balladares as Secretary General– for the presidency of RN, in an internal process that pitted him against Senators Paulina Núñez, identified with the party’s liberal-progressive wing, and María José Gatica, aligned with the conservative faction. Ultimately, the contest was decided between Galilea and Núñez, as Gatica did not advance to the runoff.

With a platform focused on building a constructive and responsible opposition, Galilea argued that RN should move beyond mere confrontation and present itself as a credible governing alternative. In the internal elections, he won with 53% of the vote, assuming leadership of the party for the 2023–2025 term.

==== Legislative Leadership ====
As party president, Galilea brought a pragmatic and consensus-oriented approach to his leadership. From his position in the Senate and in coordination with the party’s executive board, he sought to position Renovación Nacional as a key actor in legislative discussions, particularly on security and social welfare.

He emphasized that much of the government’s security agenda had originated from proposals by Chile Vamos, and in the pension reform debates, he sought a consensus-driven approach for the allocation of the additional 6% contribution, ensuring it would not negatively affect future pensions. His legislative career thus intertwined with his role as party leader, positioning RN as the country’s largest political force in terms of mayoralties and regional governments, increasing its influence within the Chile Vamos coalition.

==== Internal relations ====
However, his dialogical style also generated internal tensions. Hardline sectors accused him of conceding too much to the government, and figures such as Deputy Camila Flores criticized that his willingness to negotiate could dilute RN’s historical identity. Additionally, disputes arose with parliamentarians like Manuel José Ossandón regarding the Senate presidency.

Despite these frictions, Galilea has maintained his commitment to overcoming political polarization and has supported Evelyn Matthei’s candidacy as a moderate alternative for the center-right, reaffirming his vision of a broad, pragmatic party with a governing vocation.
