= Patricia Silva Meléndez =

Chilean politician

Patricia Silva
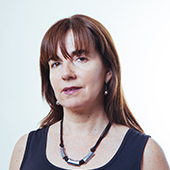

Minister Secretary-General of the Government of Chile
- In office 7 June 2015 – 27 June 2015
- President: Michelle Bachelet
- Preceded by: Jorge Insunza
- Succeeded by: Nicolás Eyzaguirre

Undersecretary-General of the Government of Chile
- In office 11 March 2014 – 26 October 2016
- President: Michelle Bachelet
- Preceded by: Claudio Alvarado
- Succeeded by: Gabriel de la Fuente

Personal details
- Born: 6 August 1964 (age 62) Santiago, Chile
- Party: Socialist Party
- Education: Central University of Chile (LL.B)
- Occupation: Politician
- Profession: Lawyer

Patricia Elizabeth Silva Meléndez (born 6 August 1964) is a Chilean teacher and political scientist.

She was caretaker minister during the second government of Michelle Bachelet after Jorge Insunza's resignation. In 2006, she served as director of labour issues during Bachelet's first government (2006−2010).

Among other activities, Silva has written labour-related columns for Barómetro de Política y Equidad, a quarterly publication jointly produced by the Equitas Foundation and the Friedrich Ebert Foundation.

== Early life and education ==
Silva was born in Santiago in 1964, the daughter of Jaime Miguel Silva Peñailillo and Leonila Meléndez Cañete. She studied law at the Central University of Chile.

She is married to lawyer Mario de Luca Capdevila.

== Public career ==
Between 1997 and 2000, during the administration of President Eduardo Frei Ruiz-Tagle, Silva served as chief of staff to Natacha Molina García, deputy director of the former National Women's Service (SERNAM). Under President Ricardo Lagos (2000–2006), she headed the Department of Women's Legal Affairs and was responsible for the agency's legislative agenda.

In that capacity, she played a leading advisory role in the drafting and passage of legislation including the divorce law (2004), family courts law (2005), workplace sexual harassment law (2005), amendments to filiation legislation (2005), child support reforms and five-day paternity leave (2005), and legislation guaranteeing breastfeeding rights for mothers of children under two years of age.

Under Michelle Bachelet's first administration, Silva was appointed director of the Labour Directorate (DT), serving from 20 March 2006 until March 2010.

Following the end of that administration, she worked between 2010 and 2013 as a partner at Desarrollo y Trabajo, a consultancy providing advice on individual and collective labour matters and supporting trade union organizations. During the same period, she taught in labour relations and workplace management diploma programmes at the Pontifical Catholic University of Valparaíso, the Diego Portales University, and the Alberto Hurtado University.

In March 2014, at the start of the second Bachelet administration, Silva was appointed Undersecretary General of the Presidency, a position she held until October 2016. Following the resignation of Jorge Insunza, she also served as acting Minister Secretary-General of the Presidency from 7 to 27 June 2015.

In April 2021, she headed the policy team of fellow party member Paula Narváez's presidential pre-campaign ahead of the 2021 Constituent Unity citizen consultation.
