= Andrea Balladares =

Chilean politician

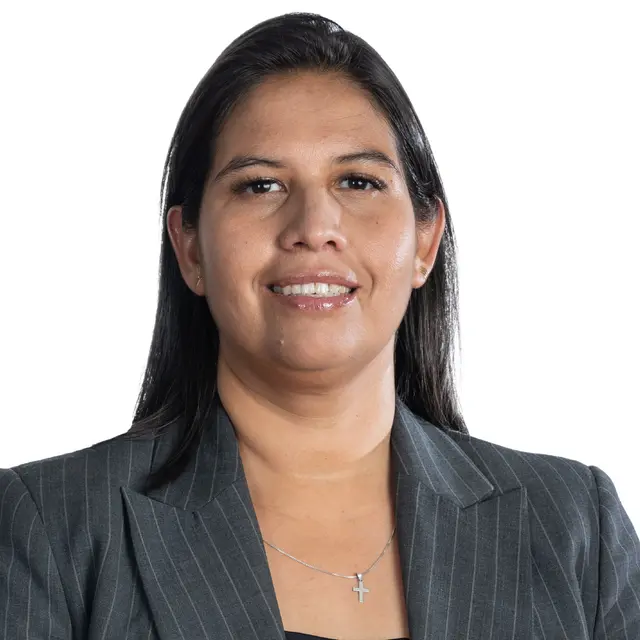

Member of the Senate
- Incumbent
- Assumed office 11 March 2026
- Preceded by: Rodrigo Galilea

Undersecretary of Social Services
- In office 6 May 2021 – 11 March 2022
- Appointed by: Sebastián Pinera
- Preceded by: Sebastián Villarreal
- Succeeded by: Francisca Perales

President of the National Renewal Youth
- In office 2012–2014
- Succeeded by: Freddy Vásquez

Personal details
- Born: 30 August 1987 (age 38) Chanco, Chile
- Party: National Renewal (RN)
- Education: Universidad Mayor (B.Sc)
- Profession: Sociologist

Andrea Paz Balladares Letelier (born 30 August 1987) is a Chilean politician.

== Family and Education ==
Born in the commune of Chanco, she is the daughter of Oscar Armando Balladares Sánchez, a merchant (timber), and Andrea de las Mercedes Letelier González.

She completed her primary and secondary education at the emblematic Liceo Antonio Varas (formerly Liceo de Hombres) in Cauquenes.

She holds a degree in sociology from Universidad Mayor and has studied law at the University of Chile.

== Political career ==
She has been a member of the National Renewal (RN) party since 2005, where she served as president of the party's Youth branch from 2012 to 2014.

During Sebastián Piñera's first government, she was part of the office of the First Lady, serving as Director of Programming from 2012 to 2014, and previously as territorial management advisor in the General Secretariat of Government.

In the second government of Piñera, she served as head of the Division of Internal Government of the Ministry of the Interior and Public Security from March 2018 to January 2020 and, as presidential delegate for the Region of La Araucanía, from April to May 2021.

On 6 May 2021, she was appointed by President Piñera as Undersecretary of Social Services, following the resignation of Sebastián Villarreal.

On 9 September 2023, she was elected Secretary General of National Renewal along with Senator Rodrigo Galilea, with whom she presides over the party.
