= Luis Cordero Vega =

Chilean politician

Luis Cordero
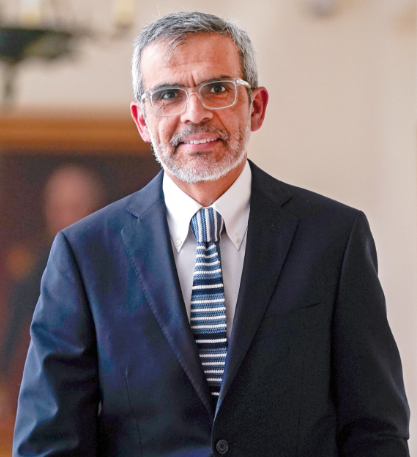

Minister of Public Security
- In office 1 April 2025 – 11 March 2026
- President: Gabriel Boric
- Preceded by: Office created
- Succeeded by: Trinidad Steinert

Undersecretary of the Interior
- In office 17 October 2024 – 1 April 2025
- President: Gabriel Boric
- Preceded by: Manuel Monsalve

Minister of Justice
- In office 11 January 2023 – 17 October 2024
- President: Gabriel Boric
- Preceded by: Marcela Ríos
- Succeeded by: Jaime Gajardo Falcón

Personal details
- Born: 12 August 1972 (age 54) Santiago, Chile
- Spouse: Magdalena Atria
- Education: Universidad La República (LL.B); University of Chile (LL.M); University of Lleida (Ph.D)
- Occupation: Politician
- Profession: Lawyer

Luis Cordero Vega (born 12 August 1972) is a Chilean politician and lawyer currently serving as minister of justice of the administration of President Gabriel Boric.

He succeeded Marcela Ríos as minister following her resignation in January 2023. Previously, he worked part-time as teacher in the University of Chile and was a regular columnist for La Segunda.

== Biography ==
=== Family and education ===
He was born on 12 August 1972 in Santiago, Chile. He is married to Magdalena Atria Barros, who has served as Chile’s ambassador to Germany since 2022.

He completed his higher education in law at Universidad La República, earning a degree in legal sciences in 1996. He later obtained a master’s degree in public law from the University of Chile in 2002, and a PhD in law from the University of Lleida, Spain, in 2005.

=== Professional career ===
He has practiced his profession in both the public and private sectors. He participated as coordinator in the reform of Chile’s environmental institutional framework and advised the National Congress on the bill establishing Environmental Courts. He also served on the Financial Supervision Reform Commission of the Ministry of Finance.

At the time of his appointment as minister, Cordero was a partner at the law firm FerradaNehme, where he led the Public Law and Government practice area. In parallel, he has continued to serve as a professor of administrative law at the Faculty of Law of the University of Chile.

He was a columnist for the newspaper La Segunda until 2022, after which he assumed office as Minister of Justice under the government of President Boric.

=== Minister of State ===
On 7 January 2023, President Gabriel Boric announced his appointment as Minister of Justice and Human Rights, following the resignation of Minister Marcela Ríos amid controversy related to presidential pardons connected to the social unrest.

On 27 March 2025, during a national address by President Gabriel Boric, his appointment as Minister of Public Security was announced. He became the first minister to lead this newly created ministry. His assumption of office and official start of duties took place on 1 April 2025.
