= Government of Chile =

- Gobierno de Chile
- Formation: 1810; 216 years ago
- Founding document: Constitution
- Jurisdiction: Chile
- Website: gov.cl

Legislative branch
- Legislature: National Congress
- Meeting place: Palace of the Congress

Executive branch
- Leader: President
- Headquarters: La Moneda
- Main organ: Cabinet of Ministers

Judicial branch
- Court: Supreme Court
- Seat: Justice Courts Palace

The Government of Chile is the set of state bodies of said country which are responsible for exercising political, administrative and executive functions, in accordance with the Constitution and the laws.

The term "government" in the Chilean Constitution includes, on the one hand, all the duties of the President of the Republic in the political leadership of Chile, as the highest head of the executive branch, and, on the other hand, those duties within the state administration, by participating in it, although without holding a monopoly over it. Currently, the government of Chile is headed by José Antonio Kast Rist, who took office on March 11, 2026.

== Composition ==
The Government of Chile is composed of all state bodies linked to the President of the Republic, to a greater or lesser degree, whether through centralization, deconcentration, decentralization, or other forms of administrative relationship, for the performance of their respective functions. Thus, the government consists of the President of the Republic, the Ministers of State and their Undersecretaries, the regional and provincial Presidential Delegations, the Regional Ministerial Secretariats, and the other public services created for public administration.

=== President of the Republic ===
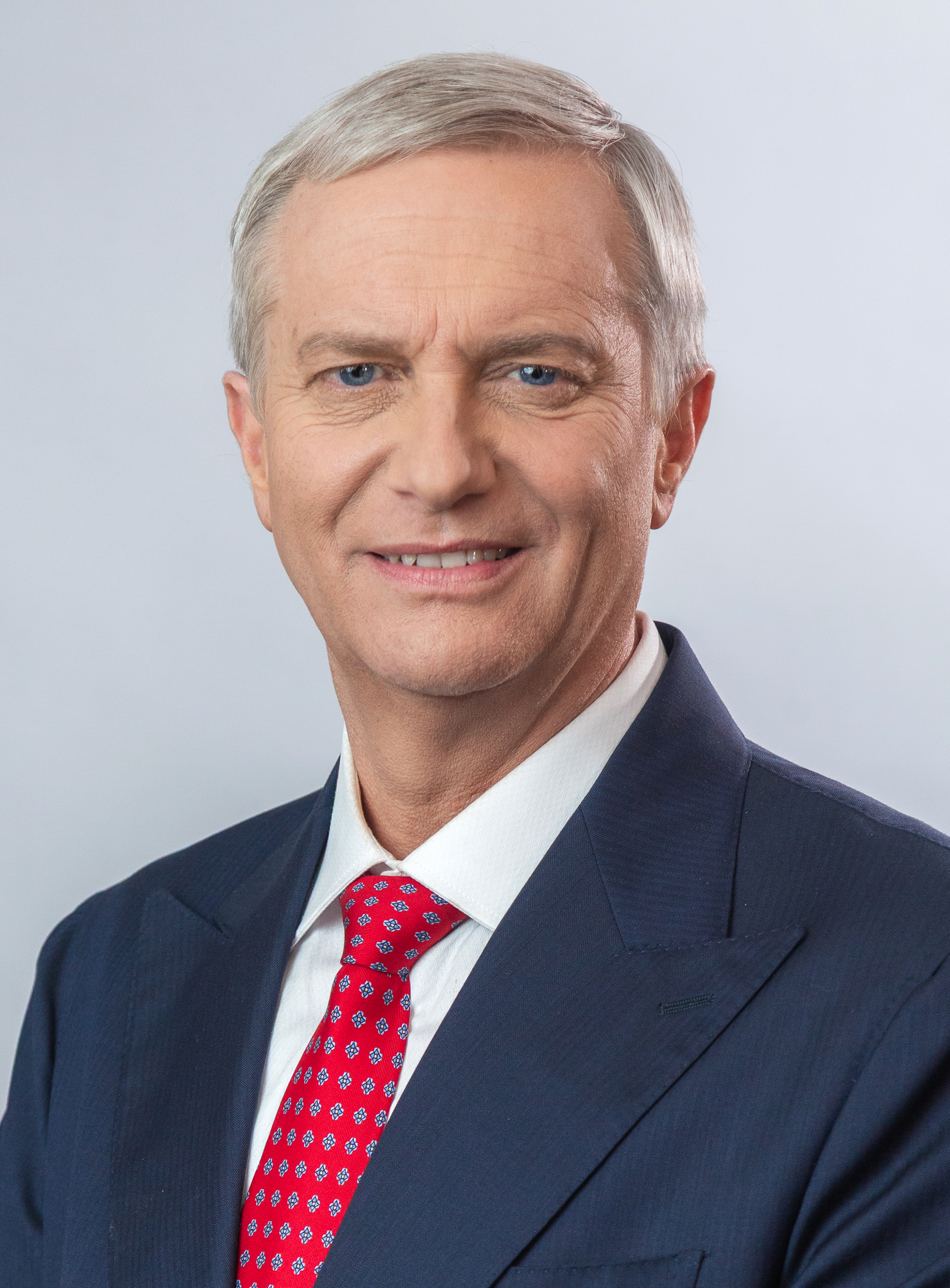
José Antonio Kast, President of the Republic of Chile from 2026.

The President of the Republic, who is both Head of State and Head of Government, has authority over all matters related to maintaining public order within the country and ensuring the external security of the Republic, in accordance with the Constitution and the laws. Furthermore, on June 1st of each year, the President of the Republic must report to the nation on the administrative and political state of the country before the full Congress.

The current President of the Republic is José Antonio Kast Rist, who took office on March 11, 2026.

=== Ministry of State ===
Ministers of State are the direct and immediate collaborators of the President of the Republic in the government and administration of the State. Ministries, as the highest bodies collaborating with the President of the Republic in the functions of government and administration of their respective sectors, must propose and evaluate the corresponding policies and plans, study and propose the regulations applicable to the sectors under their responsibility, ensure compliance with the regulations issued, allocate resources, and oversee the activities of the respective sector.

== Institutional role ==
According to the constitution, the state is at the service of the human person and its purpose is to promote the common good. The government must contribute to creating the social conditions that allow each and every member of the Chilean community to achieve their greatest possible spiritual and material fulfillment, with full respect for the rights and guarantees established by the Constitution.

Along with this, it must safeguard national security, protect the population and the family, promote the strengthening of the family, foster the harmonious integration of all sectors of the nation, and ensure the right of individuals to participate with equal opportunities in national life. Similarly, the administration of the State is at the service of the human person. Its purpose is to promote the common good by continuously and permanently addressing public needs and fostering the development of the country through the exercise of the powers conferred upon it by the Constitution and the law, and through the approval, implementation, and oversight of policies, plans, programs, and actions at the national, regional, and local levels.
