= Martín Arrau =

Chilean politician & engineer (born 1979)

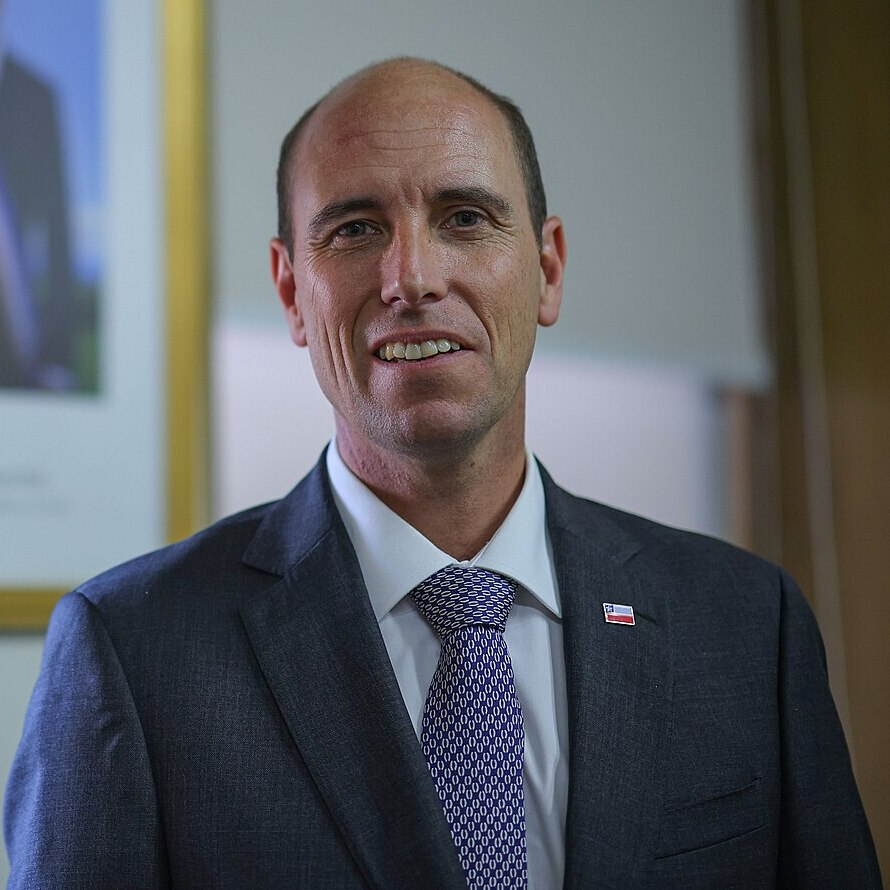
- Official portrait, 2026

Minister of Public Security
- Incumbent
- Assumed office 19 May 2026
- President: José Antonio Kast
- Preceded by: Trinidad Steinert

Minister of Public Works
- In office 11 March 2026 – 19 May 2026
- President: José Antonio Kast
- Preceded by: Jessica López Saffie
- Succeeded by: Louis de Grange

Member of the Constitutional Convention
- In office 4 July 2021 – 4 July 2022
- Constituency: 19th District

Intendant of the Ñuble Region
- In office 6 September 2018 – 20 November 2020
- Appointed by: Sebastián Piñera
- Preceded by: Position established
- Succeeded by: Cristóbal Jardua

Personal details
- Born: 6 March 1979 (age 47) Santiago, Chile
- Party: Republican (since 2022)
- Other political affiliations: Independent Democrat Union (until 2022)
- Spouse: Luz María Izquierdo
- Education: Pontifical Catholic University of Chile
- Occupation: Politician
- Profession: Engineer

Carlos Martín Arrau García-Huidobro (born 6 March 1979) is a Chilean industrial civil engineer and politician. During the presidency of José Antonio Kast, he has served as Minister of Public Security since 19 May 2026, and previously from March to May as Minister of Public Works.

From 2018 to 2020 he served as the first Intendant of the Ñuble Region, and then in 2021 was elected as a member of the Chilean Constitutional Convention, representing the 19th District of the Ñuble Region.

== Early life and family ==
Arrau was born on 6 March 1979 in Santiago, Chile. He is the son of Carlos Agustín Arrau Unzueta and Alicia Olga García-Huidobro Saavedra.

He is married to Luz María Izquierdo Irarrázaval.

== Education and professional career ==
Arrau completed his secondary education at Colegio San Ignacio El Bosque in Providencia. He later studied industrial civil engineering at the Pontifical Catholic University of Chile.

He worked professionally in companies such as Compañía Electro Metalúrgica (Elecmetal S.A.), Empresas Curiagro S.A., and the Curimapu Seed Growers group, in areas related to finance, operations, and administration.

== Political career ==
Arrau began his political career as a member of the Independent Democratic Union. Between 2010 and 2012, he served as Coordinator of Advisers at the Ministry of Agriculture (Chile), where he was responsible for monitoring infrastructure reconstruction following the 2010 Chile earthquake.

In 2017, he was appointed a councillor of the Sociedad Nacional de Agricultura. On 26 February 2017, he was appointed Presidential Delegate for the establishment of the Ñuble Region. On 5 September 2018, President Sebastián Piñera confirmed his appointment as the first Intendant of the Ñuble Region, a position he held until 20 November 2020.

In the elections held on 15–16 May 2021, Arrau ran as a candidate for the Constitutional Convention representing the 19th District of the Ñuble Region as part of the Vamos por Chile electoral pact. He obtained 22,149 votes, corresponding to 14.1% of the valid votes cast, and was elected as a member of the Convention.

In 2023, he served as campaign manager for the candidates of the Republican Party of Chile in the election for the Constitutional Council.

In 2026 he was appointed by President José Antonio Kast as Minister of Public Works, holding the position between 11 March and 19 May 2026, when he was appointed as Minister of Public Security.
