= Claudio Alvarado =

Chilean business manager and politician

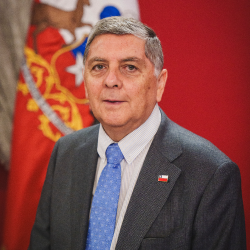
- Official portrait, 2026

Minister Secretary-General of the Government of Chile
- Incumbent
- Assumed office 19 May 2026
- President: José Antonio Kast
- Preceded by: Mara Sedini

Minister of the Interior
- Incumbent
- Assumed office 11 March 2026
- President: José Antonio Kast
- Preceded by: Álvaro Elizalde

Member of the Senate
- In office 4 August 2020 – 11 March 2022
- Constituency: 13th District

Minister Secretary-General of the Presidency
- In office 4 June 2020 – 28 July 2020
- President: Sebastián Piñera
- Preceded by: Felipe Ward
- Succeeded by: Cristián Monckeberg

Undersecretary of Regional and Administrative Development
- In office 4 November 2019 – 4 June 2020
- President: Sebastián Piñera
- Preceded by: Felipe Salaberry
- Succeeded by: Juan Manuel Masferrer

General Undersecretary of the Presidency
- In office 11 March 2010 – 11 March 2014
- President: Sebastián Piñera
- Preceded by: Edgardo Riveros Marín
- Succeeded by: Patricia Silva Meléndez

Member of the Chamber of Deputies
- In office 11 March 1994 – 11 March 2010
- Preceded by: Juan Alberto Pérez
- Succeeded by: Alejandro Santana Tirachini
- Constituency: 58th District

Mayor of Quemchi
- In office June 1985 – December 1986
- Preceded by: Leopoldo Moya Bruce
- Succeeded by: María Eugenia Acevedo Andrade

Personal details
- Born: 7 February 1960 (age 66) Santiago, Chile
- Party: UDI (since 2001)
- Other political affiliations: Independent (1980–2001)
- Spouse: Ángela María Andrade Pérez
- Children: 5
- Education: Adolfo Ibáñez University
- Occupation: Businessman • Politician

Claudio Patricio Alvarado Andrade (born 7 February 1960) is a Chilean politician and business manager, member of the Unión Demócrata Independiente (UDI). From June 2020 to July 2020, he served as Minister Secretary General of the Presidency.

In 1985, aged 25, Alvarado was appointed by Augusto Pinochet regime (1973–1990) as a mayor of Quemchi, a northwest commune in Chiloé Island. Then, in 1990s, he was elected deputy for the 58th District which groupes towns from Chiloé. In this position, he remained sixteen years (1994–2010) until 2009–10 general elections won by centre-right politician Sebastián Piñera, who appointed him as General Undersecretary of the Presidency, charge he held during all Piñera's first government (2010–2014).

In 2018, with Piñera's non-consecutive reelection, he was again named as general undersecretary (2018–2019), as Undersecretary of Regional and Administrative Development (2019–2020) and finally as Ministry General Secretariat of the Presidency.

He has served as Minister of the Interior since 11 March 2026 during the presidency of José Antonio Kast, and as Minister Secretary-General of the Government of Chile (Segegob) (Government Spokesperson) since May 19, 2026.

== Biography ==
He was born on 7 February 1960 in Castro, Chiloé Island. He is the son of José Guillermo Alvarado Andrade and María Irma Andrade Bahamonde. He is the father of five children.

He completed his primary education at School D-922 in Castro and his secondary education at Liceo B-34 in the same city. After finishing school, he enrolled at the Valparaíso School of Business (now Adolfo Ibáñez University), where he graduated with a degree in Economics and a licentiate degree in Business Administration.

=== Professional career ===
He began his professional career in 1983 as Head of Financial Control at the Municipality of Ancud, a position he held until 1984. The following year, he was appointed Head of the Municipal Department of Education Administration in Castro.

Between 1988 and 1992, he served as an agent of the Bank of Credit and Investments (BCI) in Ancud, and later, from 1992 to 1993, as a regional agent of the same bank in Puerto Montt.

== Political career ==
A member of the Independent Democratic Union (UDI), he was appointed mayor of the commune of Quemchi, in the Los Lagos Region, on 22 July 1985, holding the position until December 1986.

In the parliamentary elections of December 1993, he was elected to the Chamber of Deputies representing District No. 58 in the Los Lagos Region. He was re-elected in 1997 with the highest vote share, obtaining 23,316 votes, equivalent to 36.35% of the valid votes cast. In 2001, he again achieved the highest vote share with 26,203 votes, corresponding to 40.48% of the valid votes. In 2005, he was elected for a fourth parliamentary term but did not secure re-election for a fifth term after losing his seat in the 2009 elections.

On 11 March 2010, he assumed office as Undersecretary of the General Secretariat of the Presidency (Segpres), a position he held until 11 March 2014 during the first administration of President Sebastián Piñera Echenique.

On 11 March 2018, at the start of Piñera's second term, he was again appointed Undersecretary of the General Secretariat of the Presidency, serving until 4 November 2019. On that same date, he became Undersecretary for Regional and Administrative Development (SUBDERE), a post he held until 4 June 2020, when he was appointed Minister Secretary-General of the Presidency, serving until 28 July 2020.

For the parliamentary elections of November 2021, the UDI nominated Jacqueline van Rysselberghe and Gustavo Sanhueza as its candidates for the Senate in the 16th Electoral District (Ñuble Region). Sanhueza was elected, and as a result, he did not continue for a new parliamentary term after having replaced Víctor Pérez in August 2020.

He has served as Minister of the Interior since 11 March 2026 during the presidency of José Antonio Kast, and as Minister Secretary-General of the Government of Chile (Segegob) (Government Spokesperson) since 19 May 2026.
