= Louis de Grange =

Chilean engineer and politician

Minister of Public Works
- Incumbent
- Assumed office 19 May 2026
- President: José Antonio Kast
- Preceded by: Martín Arrau

Minister of Transport
- Incumbent
- Assumed office 11 March 2026
- President: José Antonio Kast
- Preceded by: Juan Carlos Muñoz

Head of Santiago Metro
- In office 23 April 2018 – 23 April 2022
- President: Sebastián Pinera (2018–2022); Gabriel Boric (2022)
- Preceded by: Rodrigo Azócar
- Succeeded by: Guillermo Muñoz Senda

Personal details
- Born: 1 April 1973 (age 53) Santiago, Chile
- Education: Pontifical Catholic University of Chile
- Occupation: Engineer • Politician

Louis de Grange Concha (born 1 April 1973) is a Chilean industrial engineer and transportation specialist. He has served as Minister of Transport since 11 March 2026 during the presidency of José Antonio Kast, and as Minister of Public Works since May 19, 2026.

Between March 2018 and April 2022, he served as chairman of the board of Metro S.A., the state-owned company that operates the Santiago Metro.

== Biography ==
Louis de Grange Concha was born on 1 April 1973. Louis de Grange is of French heritage. His father, Alain de Grange, immigrated from France to Chile in his twenties and initially stayed at a boarding house in the centre of Santiago, owned by Louis's maternal grandmother. There he met the grandmother's daughter, María Beatriz Concha, who became his wife and Louis's mother.

He studied industrial civil engineering at the Pontifical Catholic University of Chile, graduating in 1998. He later obtained a Master’s degree in Transport Economics and a PhD in Transport Systems Planning from the same university.

In 2008, he was selected by El Mercurio as one of the country’s “100 Young Leaders,” being described as a “public opinion leader” during the Transantiago public transport crisis.

He has worked as an academic at the Pontifical Catholic University of Chile, where he is an adjunct associate professor in the Department of Industrial and Systems Engineering, and at Diego Portales University, where he served as director of the School of Industrial Engineering between 2006 and 2018.

He has authored approximately thirty academic publications and has acted as a peer reviewer for several scientific journals in the fields of transportation and urban planning, including Transportation Science, Transportation Research, Transport Policy, Transportation, Transportmetrica, Applied Economics, Geographical Analysis, and EURE, among others.

Between 2012 and 2014, de Grange served as a director of Metro S.A., and on 23 April 2018 he was appointed chairman of the board.

In May 2019, he was the target of a letter bomb attack, later claimed by the ecoterrorist group Individualists Tending to the Wild, which was intercepted by Carabineros de Chile.

Later that year, he oversaw the response of Metro S.A. during the 2019–2020 Chilean protests, which caused extensive damage to the metro network and led to its unprecedented complete shutdown for two days.

On 25 April 2022, he announced his resignation as chairman of Metro S.A.

On 20 January 2026, president-elect José Antonio Kast nominated him as Minister of Transport and Telecommunications, a position he assumed on 11 March 2026. On May 19, he was appointed as Minister of Public Works.
