= Ministry of Public Security (Chile) =

Government ministry in Chile

- Ministerio de Seguridad Pública
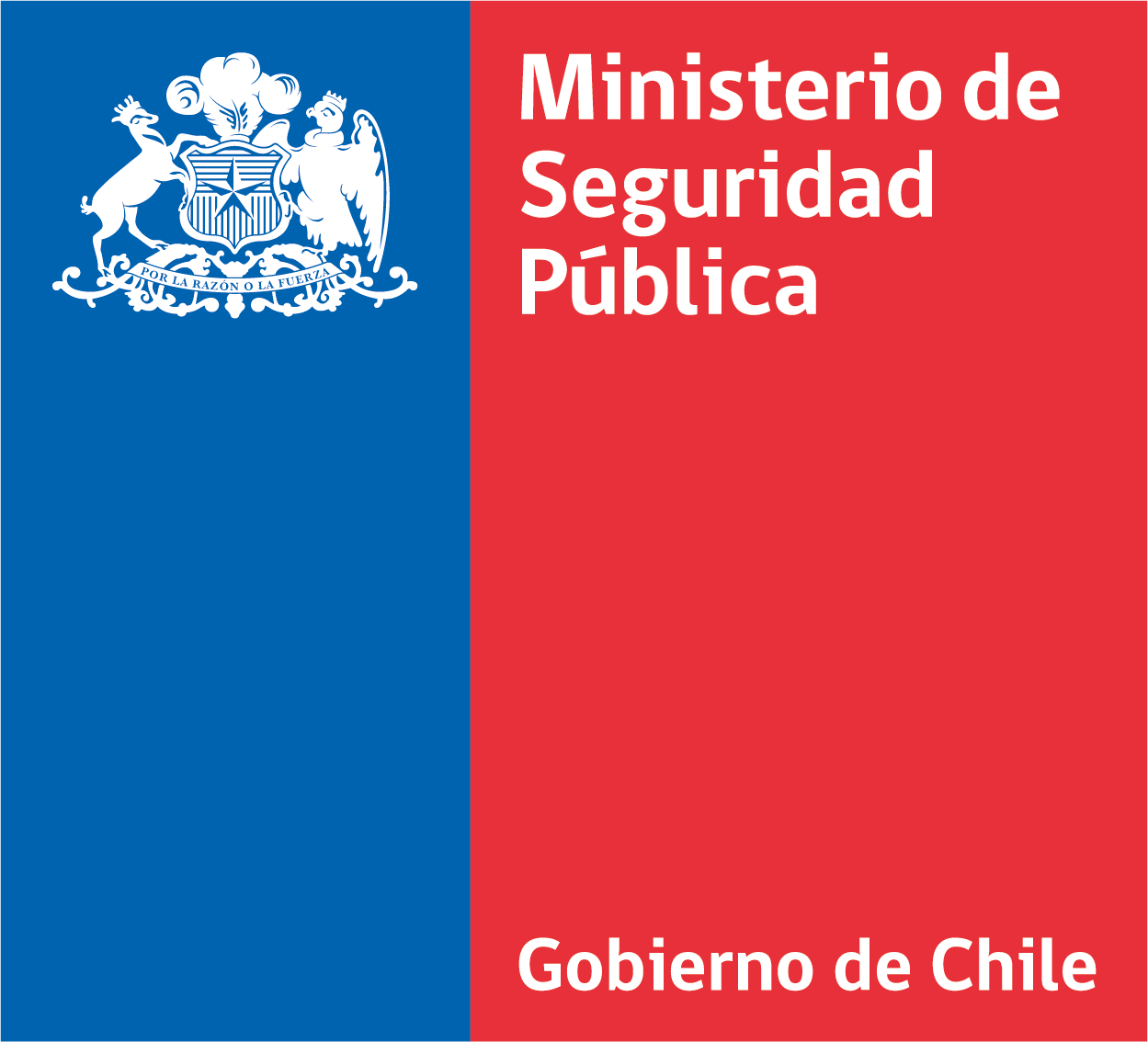
- Governmental logo

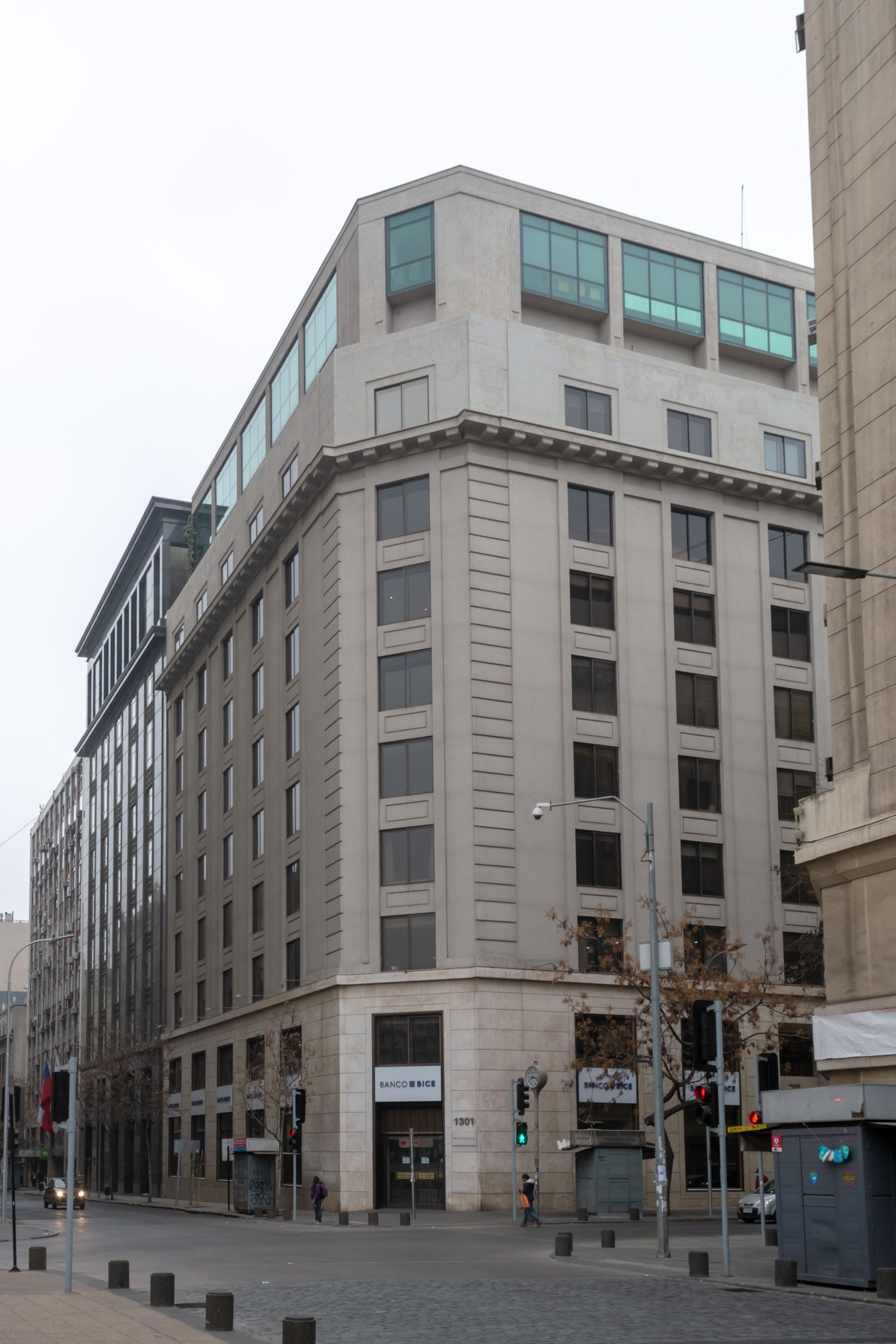
- Headquarters of the Ministry of Public Security

Agency overview
- Formed: 1 April 2025
- Preceding agency: Ministry of the Interior and Public Security (2011–2025)
- Type: Ministry
- Jurisdiction: National
- Headquarters: 220 Teatinos, Santiago
- Employees: 10,602 (2025)
- Annual budget: CLP 2.42 trillion (2026)
- Minister of Public Security responsible: Martín Arrau
- Deputy Ministers responsible: Pilar Giannini, Undersecretary of Public Security; Gonzalo Guerrero, Undersecretary of Crime Prevention
- Parent department: Executive Branch
- Parent agency: Presidency of the Republic
- Website: https://minsegpublica.cl/

The Ministry of Public Security (Spanish: Ministerio de Seguridad Pública) is the department of the Government of Chile responsible for public order, internal public security, and crime prevention. Created by Law No. 21,730 and operating since 1 April 2025, it took over the security functions previously held by the Ministry of the Interior and Public Security, which returned to its earlier name, Ministry of the Interior, with a mandate centered on political coordination of the cabinet and territorial government.

The ministry proposes the National Public Security Policy and related legislation, and it coordinates the Public Security System, a network of public and private institutions that includes the police, prosecutors, and municipalities. Its two national police forces, Carabineros de Chile and the Investigations Police of Chile (PDI), report to it. A constitutional reform enacted in April 2026 also places Gendarmería de Chile, the prison service, under the ministry; the transfer is still being implemented.

The ministry has had three ministers: Luis Cordero Vega under President Gabriel Boric, and Trinidad Steinert and Martín Arrau under President José Antonio Kast. Steinert left office after 69 days. Arrau has been minister since 19 May 2026.

== History ==
=== Background ===
Before 2011, Chile had no ministry devoted to security. Law No. 20,502, enacted that year under President Sebastián Piñera, created the Ministry of the Interior and Public Security. The change created the Undersecretariat of Crime Prevention and moved Carabineros and the PDI from the Ministry of National Defense to the new ministry. The arrangement placed security policy under the same minister who served as the president's chief of cabinet and handled political contingencies.

On 3 September 2021, during his second term, Piñera presented a bill to create a separate Ministry of Public Security. The bill created undersecretariats for public security and crime prevention, made Carabineros and the PDI hierarchically subordinate to the new ministry, and linked the National Intelligence Agency to it on security matters. Piñera argued that separating the functions would shield the interior minister from the daily pressures of security and give the portfolio a more specialized, technical focus. The Boric administration, which took office in 2022, kept the bill alive before it had cleared its first stage in Congress and added its own proposals. Some critics, including the think tank Libertad y Desarrollo, argued that the bill did not go far enough in specializing and professionalizing the security system.

=== Legislative passage ===
The Chamber of Deputies approved the amended bill on 3 May 2024 by 116 votes to 22, sending it to a third reading in the Senate. In July the Senate referred unresolved provisions to a joint committee. The Senate approved the committee's report on 3 December 2024 by 35 votes to 5, with 2 abstentions, and the Chamber did so the next day by 91 to 28, with 6 abstentions.

President Boric promulgated Law No. 21,730 on 27 January 2025, acknowledging that the project originated in Piñera's second government. The law was published in the Diario Oficial on 5 February 2025 and the ministry began operating on 1 April 2025, under a decree with force of law that set its staffing plans and start date.

=== Installation under Boric (2025) ===
On 27 March 2025 Boric named Cordero, a lawyer and former undersecretary of the interior, as the first minister. Cordero said his first task was to make public security a permanent state policy rather than one absorbed by day-to-day events. Kast, then a presidential candidate, criticized the choice, saying Cordero lacked experience in security matters. Outgoing Interior Minister Carolina Tohá announced that the ministry would be headquartered at 220 Teatinos Street.

The ministry's budget accounts could be used only from 1 April, which delayed the appointment of regional secretaries; in the interim, regional justice secretaries filled in. Some legislators objected that certain interim officials did not meet the law's experience requirements. Regional appointments followed in mid-2025. By September 2025 the ministry reported that the two national advisory councils had been constituted and that the regional secretaries had been named. The main regulatory milestones of this period were the regulation of the Public Security System and the Integrated Police Coordination Center (see Organization) and the National Public Security Policy (see below).

=== Kast government (2026) ===
Kast took office on 11 March 2026 and named Trinidad Steinert, a former regional prosecutor for Tarapacá, as minister. Andrés Jouannet and Ana Victoria Quintana became the undersecretaries of public security and crime prevention. On 23 March 2026 the ministry announced cuts of more than CLP 72 billion as part of a 3 percent reduction across all ministries, with most of the reduction falling on Carabineros. By May, Steinert faced criticism, including from the opposition, for not having presented a security program, and deputies announced an interpellation.

On 19 May 2026 Kast carried out his first cabinet change, replacing Steinert with Arrau, previously the minister of public works. Arrau is a member of the Republican Party and a former intendant of the Ñuble Region. He said the National Public Security Policy signed under Boric was sufficient as a framework and that his government would add an operational plan on top of it. On 2 June he removed both undersecretaries; María del Pilar Giannini Bravo and Gonzalo Guerrero Valle took their posts.

The same day, Arrau presented the Senate with a "Public Security Operational Plan 2026–2030" of 65 measures, made up of 39 operational actions and 26 priority bills. The plan is organized around prevention, recovery of territorial control, and institutional strengthening. Its priorities include control of streets and neighborhoods, ending the recruitment of minors by criminal gangs, protecting borders and critical routes, combating organized crime, strengthening prison policy, consolidating the new ministry, and supporting the police. Two installation tasks remained pending in mid-2026: implementation of the municipal security law and the transfer of Gendarmería.

==== Gendarmería ====
Constitutional reform Law No. 21,810, promulgated by Kast on 9 April 2026 and published on 16 April, added Gendarmería de Chile to the Order and Public Security Forces alongside Carabineros and the PDI, and placed it under the Ministry of Public Security instead of the Ministry of Justice and Human Rights. The reform requires the president to submit, within twelve months, a bill creating a specialized social reintegration service and to adapt existing law, including the ministry's founding law. Until that service exists, Gendarmería continues its reintegration work under the coordination of the Justice Ministry together with the Ministry of Public Security. The government's operational plan includes a reform of Gendarmería's organic law to complete the transfer.

==== Steinert controversy ====
In July 2026 the Comptroller General ruled that Steinert had exceeded her powers and breached her duty of abstention when, two days after taking office, she requested detailed information from the PDI about officers of an anti-narcotics brigade tied to a prosecutor-led investigation she had previously directed in Tarapacá. The Chamber of Deputies voted 62 to 58, with one abstention, to create a special investigative commission on her tenure, after an earlier proposal had failed to reach a quorum. Steinert's defenders, including politicians from the governing coalition, criticized the ruling; she asked the Comptroller to reconsider it and did not attend the commission's first two sessions, citing personal reasons.

== Mandate ==
Law No. 21,730 charges the ministry with assisting the president on matters of public order and public security, crime prevention, and the protection of people in security matters. Its main statutory functions include:

- formulating, designing, and evaluating national policies to prevent and combat organized crime, drug trafficking, and terrorism, in coordination with the National Intelligence Agency and the police forces;
- proposing the National Public Security Policy to the president, including a crime prevention strategy, victim protection and assistance, and measures against organized crime and terrorism;
- proposing legislative, regulatory, and administrative initiatives in its field and evaluating their implementation; and
- ensuring the proper functioning of the Public Security System.

The law also gives the ministry powers to evaluate the financial, administrative, operational, and educational management of the police, with the stated aim of orienting policing toward the protection of people.

== Organization ==
=== Undersecretariats and regional offices ===
The ministry has two undersecretariats and a regional structure:

- The Undersecretariat of Public Security develops policy on security, public order, and organized crime and coordinates relations with the police. Of the 329 positions budgeted for it in 2026, 165 came from the Undersecretariat of the Interior (62), the Undersecretariat of Crime Prevention (43), and the Government Interior Service (60).
- The Undersecretariat of Crime Prevention designs, implements, and evaluates policies to prevent crime and support victims. Created in 2011 within the Interior Ministry, it was moved to the new ministry in 2025.
- Regional ministerial secretariats (seremis) of public security represent the ministry in each region, and provincial departments cover one or more provinces according to criteria such as distance and connectivity. Seremis must have at least three years of experience in security matters or six years of professional experience.

=== Public Security System ===
The law creates a Public Security System made up of public and private institutions that coordinate to maintain public order and prevent crime, with the ministry responsible for its functioning. The system includes state agencies with security functions, the public prosecutor's office, municipalities, and other public and private entities. Its governing rules were set out in a 2025 regulation, Decree No. 55, which defines the system's institutional structure and governs the Integrated Police Coordination Center.

Two advisory bodies help the ministry prepare the national policy:

- The National Public Security Council includes the ministers of the interior, national defense, finance, and justice and human rights, the national prosecutor, and the heads of Carabineros, the PDI, and Gendarmería.
- The National Crime Prevention Council includes the ministers of the interior, national defense, finance, justice and human rights, social development and family, education, housing and urban development, and women and gender equity, together with the director general of Carabineros.

=== Integrated Police Coordination Center ===
The Integrated Police Coordination Center (Centro Integrado de Coordinación Policial, CICPOL) is an advisory unit to the minister. It identifies risk situations, coordinates complex police operations, and facilitates information exchange among its members and with other public and private entities. It is staffed by ministry officials, Carabineros, and the PDI, and led by a general officer of the security forces.

=== National Citizen Protection System ===
The law also creates the National Citizen Protection System (Sistema Nacional de Protección Ciudadana), a single point of contact for the public in cases of crime, road accidents, fires, and medical emergencies. It is intended to provide a coordinated first response by police, ambulances, municipal security services, and the armed forces.

=== Police and other institutions ===
Carabineros de Chile and the PDI are the ministry's two principal operating institutions, and Gendarmería is being transferred under the 2026 reform. The ministry's budget section also includes the Carabineros Hospital and the National Cybersecurity Agency. The law also requires the ministry to coordinate with the National Intelligence Agency.

== National Public Security Policy ==
In July 2025 the two national councils approved a proposed National Public Security Policy (Política Nacional de Seguridad Pública, PNSP). Boric signed the decree adopting the PNSP 2025–2031 on 22 October 2025, and it was published in the Diario Oficial on 30 January 2026. The policy sets the aim of reducing violent crime and public fear, based on a diagnosis of the previous ten years: relatively stable victimization, persistently high fear of crime, and a rise in the most violent offenses. It sets guidelines in six areas: prevention among children and youth, territorial prevention, crime control, criminal prosecution, sanctions, prisons and reintegration, and victim assistance and protection. The strategies that implement it are to be reviewed every two years. The Kast government kept the policy in force rather than replacing it.

== Budget and personnel ==
The ministry's initial budget for 2026 was CLP 2,422,320,865 thousand, or about 2.42 trillion pesos. Most of it covers the two police forces: the budget bill proposed about CLP 1.67 trillion for Carabineros and CLP 551 billion for the PDI, compared with CLP 109 billion for the Undersecretariat of Public Security and CLP 84 billion for the Undersecretariat of Crime Prevention. The bill financed 52,317 positions in Carabineros, 14,266 in the PDI, and 329 in the Undersecretariat of Public Security. During passage of the budget, Congress added CLP 5 billion, of which CLP 4.5 billion went to PDI technology and CLP 500 million to Carabineros' reserved intelligence spending. In March 2026 the government announced spending cuts of more than CLP 72 billion in the ministry, including CLP 51.6 billion from Carabineros and CLP 16.7 billion from the PDI.

== List of ministers ==
Minister		Start	End	Party	President
1	Luis Cordero Vega	1 April 2025	11 March 2026	Ind.	Gabriel Boric
2	Trinidad Steinert	11 March 2026	19 May 2026	Ind.	José Antonio Kast
3	Martín Arrau	19 May 2026	Incumbent	Republican	José Antonio Kast

== See also ==
- Ministry of the Interior
- Carabineros de Chile
- Investigations Police of Chile
