= Chilean transition to democracy =

Process of Chile moving away from dictatorship

Republic of Chile República de Chile
- Flag Coat of arms
- Motto: Por la razón o la fuerza ("By reason or by force")
- Anthem: Himno Nacional de Chile ("National Anthem of Chile")
- Map of Chile showing undisputed territory in dark green, and territorial claims in light green.
- Capital: Santiago
- Common languages: Spanish
- Government: Unitary presidential constitutional republic
- President
  - 1990–1994: Patricio Aylwin (first)
  - 2026–present: José Antonio Kast (current)
- Legislature: National Congress
  - Upper house: Senate
  - Lower house: Chamber of Deputies
- Establishment: Return to democracy
  - Established: 11 March 1990

Area
  - Total: 756,096.3 km^{2} (291,930.4 sq mi) (37th)

Population
  - 1990: 13,178,782
  - 2023: 19,629,588
- Currency: Chilean peso
- ISO 3166 code: CL
Preceded by	Succeeded by
Military dictatorship of Chile	Chile

The military dictatorship of Chile led by General Augusto Pinochet ended on 11 March 1990 and was replaced by a democratically elected government. The transition period lasted roughly two years, between 1988 and 1990, a period which encompasses the rejection of Pinochet at the 1988 plebiscite, the 1989 constitutional revision, and the 1989 presidential election and ensuing presidential handover from Pinochet to Christian Democrat Patricio Aylwin in 1990. However, some aspects of the process lasted significantly longer; for this reason, there is no consensus among historians as to whether the transition is still ongoing or has been over. Notable events in these extended aspects include, from earliest to latest, the arrest and trial of Pinochet in 1998-2000; the 2005 constitutional reforms, which removed the remaining authoritarian vestiges from the Chilean constitution; the election of center-right businessman Sebastián Piñera, the first post-Junta president not to come from the Concertación, the coalition of parties formed to oppose Pinochet's continued rule, in 2010; the replacement of the binomial voting system, designed by the military regime to benefit right-wing parties sympathetic to it, with a conventional system of party-list proportional representation in 2017; and the attempted constitutional replacement process initiated in 2020 and ensuing rejections of a proposed left-wing constitution in 2022 and right-wing constitution in 2023.

Unlike most democratic transitions, led by either the elite or the people, Chile's democratic transition process is known as an intermediate transition – a transition involving both the regime and the civil society. Throughout the transition, though the regime increased repressive violence, it simultaneously supported liberalization – progressively strengthening democratic institutions and gradually weakening those of the military.

Three factors contributed to the rise of democracy: the economy, the role of the military, and domestic politics. Rapid economic growth (attributed to a low inflation environment), a decline in dictatorship, and the decision of political parties to come together became the main motivation for a broad ideological coalition to be created in an effort to defeat Pinochet and his military rule. Chile was previously a democracy during the Presidential Republic (1925–1973).

Preparation for the transition began within the dictatorship itself, when a constitution establishing a transition process was approved in a plebiscite. From 11 March 1981 to March 1990, several organic constitutional laws were approved, intended to lead to the restoration of democracy. After the 1988 plebiscite, the 1980 Constitution (still in effect today) was amended to ease provisions for future amendments to the constitution, create more seats in the senate, diminish the role of the National Security Council, and equalize the number of civilian and military members (four members each).

== 1988 plebiscite and reform of the Constitution ==
The Chilean constitution was passed under tight military control in 1980, and was designed to lead to a plebiscite in which the Chilean people would ratify a candidate proposed by the Chief of Staff of the Chilean Armed Forces and by the General Director of the Carabineros, the national police force, and who would become the President of Chile for an eight-year term. In 1980, this meant that the Chilean people were supposed to approve Augusto Pinochet's candidacy, assuring him of popular legitimacy and the sanction of a vote. If the people refused the junta's chosen candidate, the military would relinquish political control to the civilians, leading to presidential and parliamentary democratic elections the following year, putting an end to the military government.

In 1987, Pinochet's government passed a law allowing the creation of political parties and another law allowing the opening of national registers of voters. If a majority of the people voted "yes" to Pinochet's plebiscite, he would have remained in power for the next eight years. Instead, Congress was elected and installed on 11 March 1990.

Touch only one of my men, and forget about the rule of law.

— Augusto Pinochet, 1989

=== Context and causes of Pinochet's decision to follow the Constitution ===
Various factors led to Pinochet's decision to follow this procedure, including the situation in the Soviet Union, where Mikhail Gorbachev had initiated the glasnost and the perestroika democratic reforms. Those reforms led to the fall of the Berlin Wall in 1989 and to the official end of the Cold War, which was an important factor.

The Cold War had important consequences in South America, considered by the United States to be a full part of the Western Bloc, in contrast with the Eastern Bloc, a division born with the end of World War II and the Yalta Conference. Following the 1959 Cuban Revolution and the local implementation in several countries of Che Guevara's foco theory, the US waged a campaign in South America against the "Communist subversives." In a few years, all of South America was covered by similar military dictatorships, called juntas. In Paraguay, Alfredo Stroessner had been in power since 1954; in Brazil, left-wing President João Goulart was overthrown by a military coup in 1964; in Bolivia, General Hugo Banzer overthrew leftist General Juan José Torres in 1971; in Uruguay, considered the "Switzerland" of South America, Juan María Bordaberry seized power in the 27 June 1973 coup. A "Dirty War" was waged all over the continent, culminating with Operation Condor, an agreement between security services of the Southern Cone, other South American countries, and US government bodies, which provided training to repress and assassinate domestic political opponents. In 1976, militaries seized power in Argentina and supported the 1980 "Cocaine Coup" of Luis García Meza Tejada in Bolivia, before training the Contras in Nicaragua where the Sandinista National Liberation Front, headed by Daniel Ortega, had taken power in 1979. Similar military coups took place in Guatemala and in El Salvador. In the 1980s, however, the situation progressively evolved in the world as in South America, despite a renewal of the Cold War from 1979 to 1985, the year during which Gorbachev replaced Konstantin Chernenko as leader of the USSR.

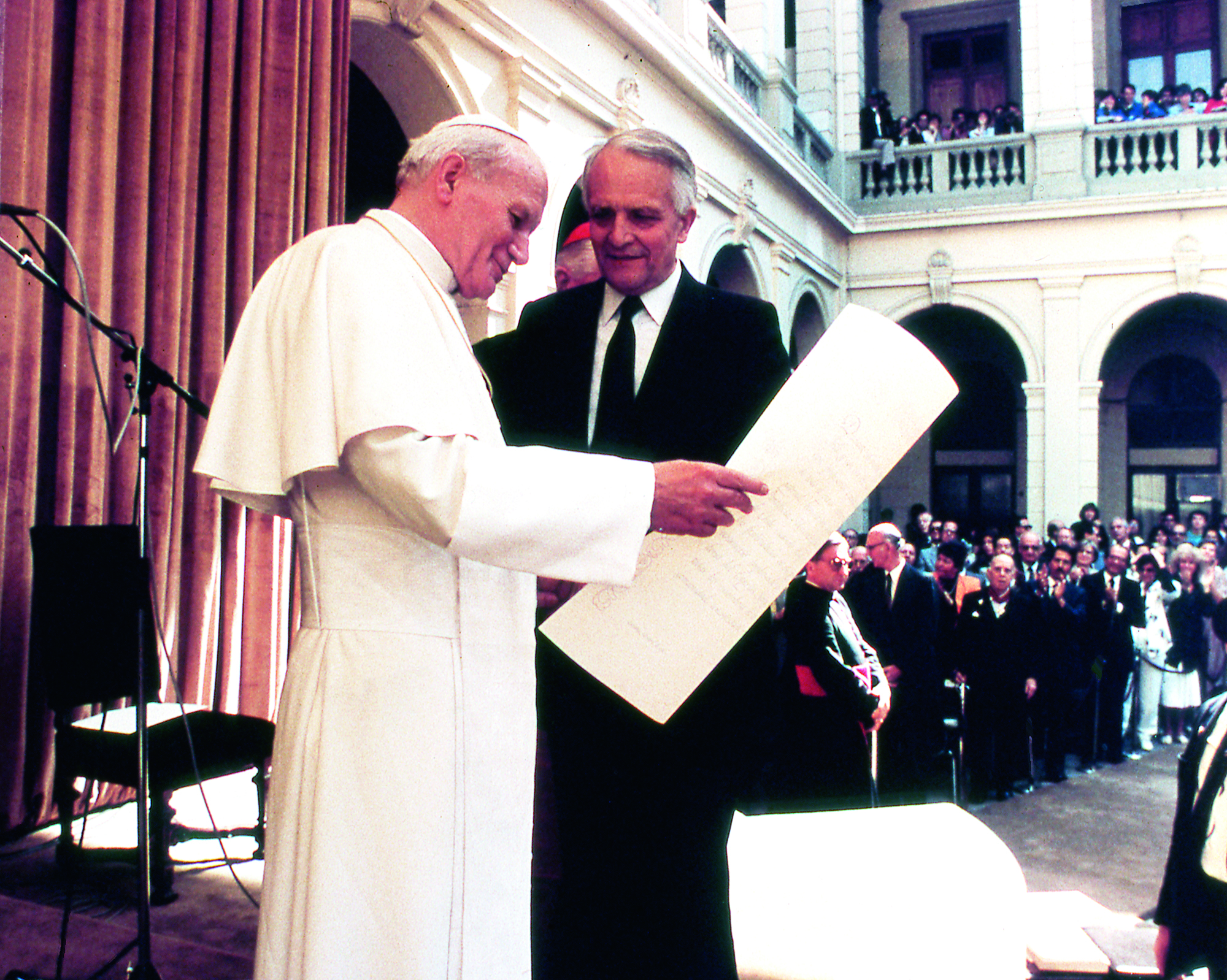
It is believed that the visit of Pope John Paul II in April 1987 may have influenced Pinochet's decision to call for elections. The Pope is shown here at the Pontifical Catholic University of Chile on 4 April 1987.

Another alleged reason for Pinochet's decision to call for elections was Pope John Paul II's April 1987 visit to Chile: he visited Santiago, Viña del Mar, Valparaíso, Temuco, Punta Arenas, Puerto Montt and Antofagasta. Before his pilgrimage to Latin America, the pontiff criticized Pinochet's regime as "dictatorial" while speaking with reporters. According to The New York Times, he was "using unusually strong language" to criticize Pinochet and told the journalists that the Church in Chile must not only pray, but actively fight for the restoration of democracy in Chile. During his 1987 Chilean visit, the Polish pope asked Chile's 31 Catholic bishops to campaign for free elections in the country. According to George Weigel, the Pope held a meeting with Pinochet during which they discussed the topic of the return to democracy. John Paul II allegedly pushed Pinochet to accept a democratic opening of the regime, and even called for his resignation. In 2007, Cardinal Stanisław Dziwisz, acting as Pope John Paul II's secretary, confirmed that the Pope asked Pinochet to step down and transfer power over to civilian authorities during his visit. John Paul II also supported the Vicariate of Solidarity during his visit, which was a Church-led pro-democracy, anti-Pinochet organization. John Paul II visited the Vicariate of Solidarity's offices, spoke with its workers, and "called upon them to continue their work, emphasizing that the Gospel consistently urges respect for human rights." Some have erroneously accused John Paul II of affirming Pinochet's regime by appearing with the Chilean ruler on his balcony. However, Cardinal Roberto Tucci, organizer of John Paul II's pilgrimages, revealed that Pinochet tricked the pontiff by telling him he would take him to his living room, while in reality, he took him to his balcony. Tucci claims that the pontiff was "furious."

Whatever the case, political advertising was legalized on 5 September 1987, and became a key element of the "NO" campaign for the referendum, which countered the official campaign that proposed a return to a Popular Unity government in case of Pinochet's defeat. Finally, the "NO" to Pinochet won with 55.99% of the votes, against 44.01% of the votes. As a result, presidential and legislative elections were called for the following year.

In July 1989, a constitutional referendum took place after long negotiations between the government and the opposition. 54 constitutional reforms were proposed, among which was reform of the way that the Constitution itself could be reformed, the restriction of state of emergency declarations, the affirmation of political pluralism, and the strengthening of constitutional rights, as well as of the democratic principle and of participation in political life. All parties in the political spectrum supported the reforms, with the exception of the small right-wing Avanzada Nacional and other minor parties. The referendum passed with 91.25% of the vote.

== Aylwin administration ==
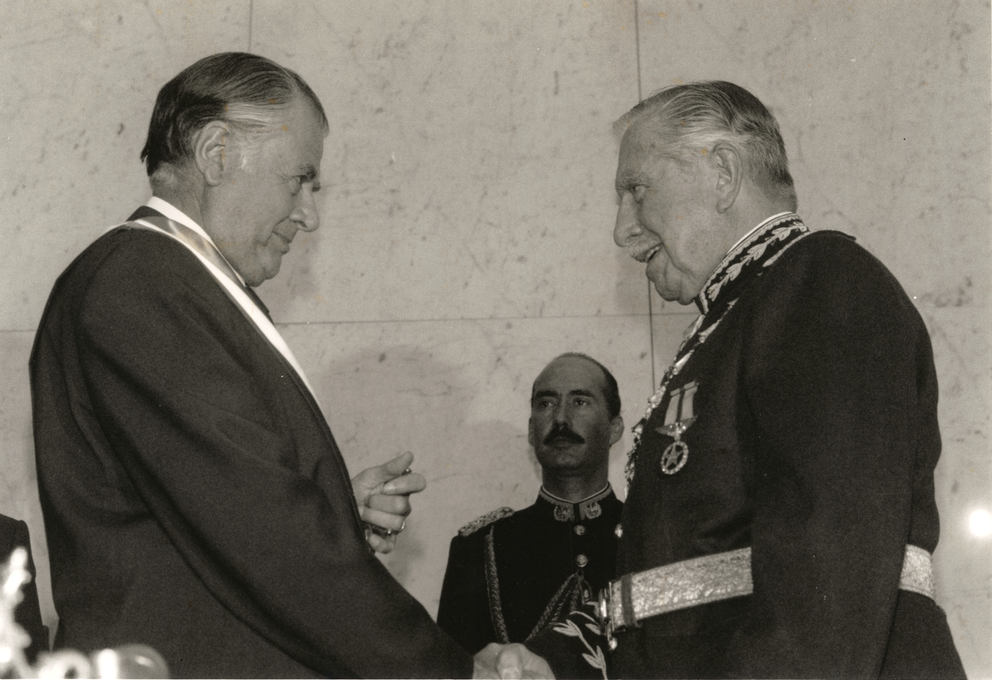
Pinochet congratulates new President Patricio Aylwin on inauguration day, 11 March 1990.

The Concertación coalition, which supported the return to democracy, gathered the Christian Democrat Party (PDC), the Socialist Party (PS), the Party for Democracy (PPD) and the Social Democrat Radical Party (PRSD). Christian Democrat Patricio Aylwin won a sweeping victory in the December 1989 elections, the first democratic elections since the 1970 election won by Salvador Allende. Patricio Aylwin had gathered 3,850,023 votes (55.17%), while the center-right supermarket tycoon Francisco Javier Errázuriz Talavera from the UCCP party managed to take 15.05% of the vote, whose main effect was lowering right-wing candidate Hernán Büchi's votes to 29.40% (approximately 2 million votes).

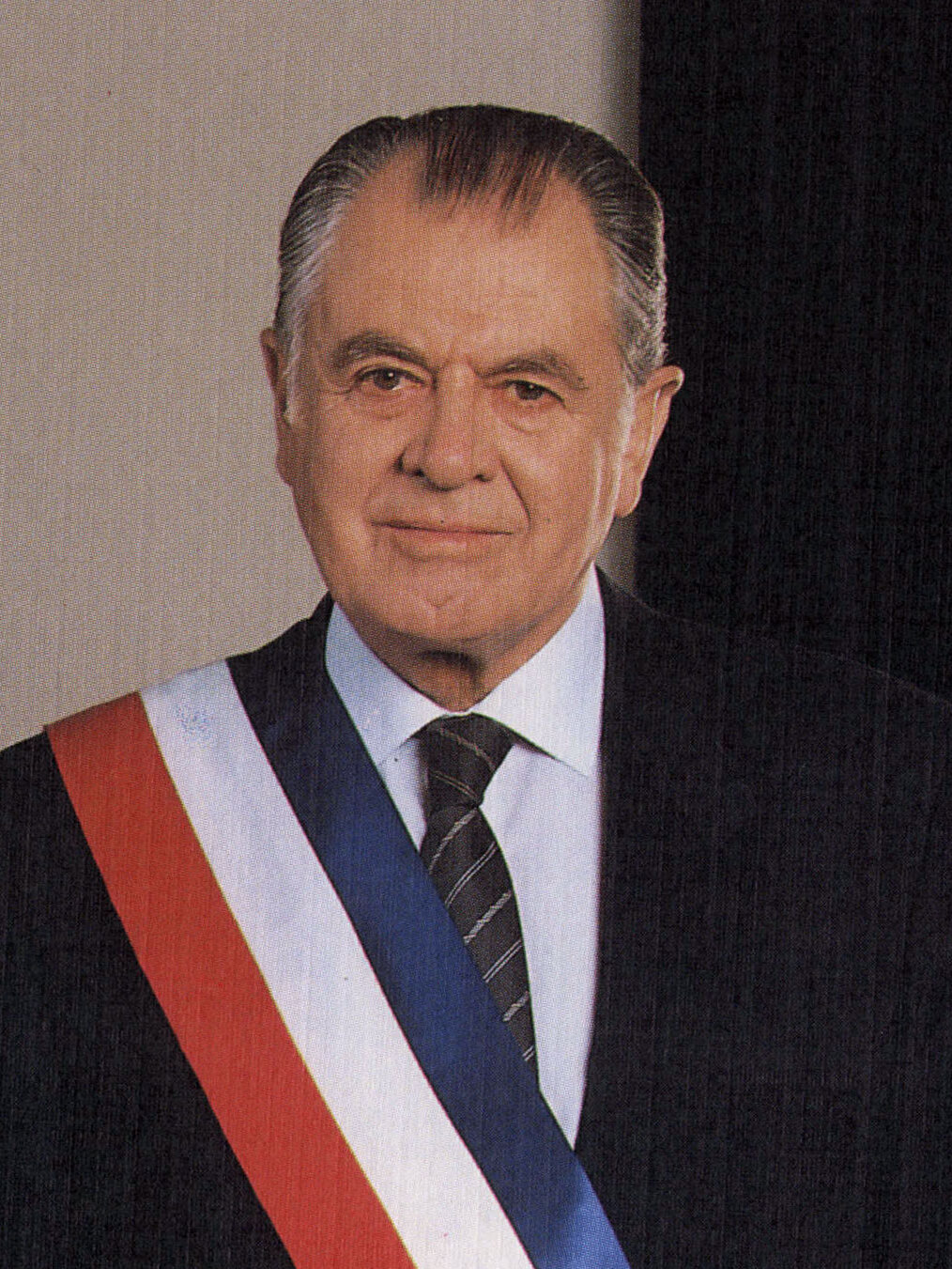
In December 1989, Patricio Aylwin, head of the Concertación coalition, won the first democratic election in Chile since 1970.

The Concertación coalition dominated Chilean politics for much of the next two decades. In February 1991, it established the National Commission for Truth and Reconciliation, releasing the Rettig Report on human rights violations during Augusto Pinochet's dictatorship. This report, contested by human rights NGOs and associations of political prisoners, counted only 2,279 cases of "disappearances" that could be proved and recorded. Of course, the very nature of "disappearances" made such investigations very difficult, while many victims were still intimidated by the authorities and did not dare go to the local police center to register themselves on lists, since the police officers were the same as during the dictatorship.

Several years later, the same problem arose with the 2004 Valech Report, which counted almost 30,000 victims of torture, among testimony from 35,000 people. However, the Rettig Report did list important detention and torture centers, such as the Esmeralda ship, the Víctor Jara Stadium, Villa Grimaldi, etc. Registration of victims of the dictatorship, and the following trials in the 2000s of military personnel for human rights violations, dominated the struggle by human rights NGOs and associations of political prisoners, many of whom resided in exile, for the recognition of crimes committed during the dictatorship.

Besides implementing the Rettig Commission, Aylwin's government established a Comisión Especial de Pueblos indígenas (Special Commission of Indigenous People), whose report provided the intellectual framework of the "Indigenous Law" (ley indígena) or law n° 19 253. The law went into effect on 28 September 1993 and recognized the Mapuche people as an inherent part of the Chilean nation. Other indigenous people officially recognized included Aymaras, Atacameñas, Collas, Quechuas, Rapa-Nui, Yámanas and Kawashkars. Despite this state proclamation of indigenous rights, conflicts brought by land-occupations and Mapuche claims led to state repression and the use of anti-terrorist laws enacted by the military junta against Mapuche activists.

== Frei Ruiz-Tagle administration ==
Preparing for the 1993 election, the Concertación held primaries in May 1993, which pitted left-wing Ricardo Lagos (PPD) against Christian-Democrat Eduardo Frei Ruiz-Tagle, (PDC), the son of former President Eduardo Frei Montalva (1911–1982, President from 1964 to 1970). Eduardo Frei won these primaries by a large majority of 63%.

The right-wing, grouped as the Alliance for Chile, also held primaries between 2 candidates: Sebastián Piñera of the National Renewal (RN) the largest right-wing party at the time and who had supported the "NO" during the 1988 plebiscite on the return to civilian rule, and Arturo Alessandri Besa, a former member of the National Party (PN), and the nephew of Jorge Alessandri, former President of the Republic during the term 1958 – 1964 and Presidential Candidate of the Right-wing in the 1970 election. Alessandri won those primaries, and thus represented the Alliance for Chile against the Concertación.

Other candidates included José Piñera, who was the former Minister in the early 1980s who had implemented the law granting ownership of copper resources to the Chilean Armed Forces, and presented himself as an independent (6%); ecologist Manfred Max-Neef (5.55%), representative of the Left-Wing Democratic Alternative, which gathered the Communist Party (PCC), MAPU (part of the Popular Unity coalition of Allende) and the Christian Left Party; Eugenio Pizarro Poblete (less than 5%); and Cristián Reitze Campos of the left-wing Humanist Party (1.1%).

On 28 May 1993, the Boinazo took place, during which paratroopers surrounded the Chilean Army headquarters located close to the Palacio de la Moneda. The motive for the military uprising was the opening of investigations concerning the "Pinocheques", or checks received by Pinochet for a total amount of $3 million as kickbacks from an arms deal. A few days before (and unnoticed at the time), Jorge Schaulsohn, President of the Chamber of Deputies, had also denounced irregularities in arms trades by the Chilean Army through the intermediary of the FAMAE (Factories and Arsenals of the Army of Chile) — which was later connected to the Gerardo Huber case, a Chilean Army Colonel and agent of DINA who was assassinated the previous year.

Eduardo Frei Ruiz-Tagle finally won the election in the first round in December 1993 with an absolute majority of almost 58% (more than 4 million votes) against Arturo Allesandri who gathered 24.4% (around 1,700 000 votes). Eduardo Frei took office in March 1994 for a 6-year term until 2000. During his term, it was not possible to prosecute any military personnel for their roles during the dictatorship, while large sectors of the Chilean society remained Pinochetista.

== Arrest and trial of Pinochet ==
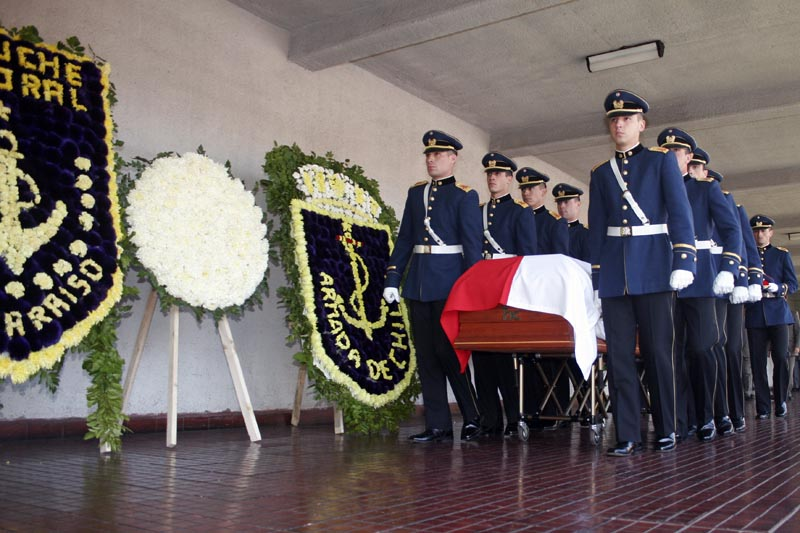
Pinochet's funeral.

Following an agreement between Pinochet and Andrés Zaldívar, president of the Senate, Zaldívar voted to abolish 11 September as a national holiday to celebrate the 1973 coup. Supporters of Pinochet had blocked any such attempts until then. The same year, Pinochet traveled to London for back surgery. Once there, he was arrested on the orders of Spanish judge Baltasar Garzón, provoking worldwide attention, not only because of the history of Chile and South America, but also because this was one of the first arrests of a dictator based on the universal jurisdiction principle. Pinochet tried to defend himself by referring to the State Immunity Act of 1978, an argument rejected by the British judicial system. However, UK Home Secretary Jack Straw released him on medical grounds, and refused to extradite him to Spain. Pinochet returned to Chile in March 2000. Upon descending the plane in his wheelchair, he quickly stood up and saluted the cheering crowd of supporters, including an army band playing his favorite military march tunes, which was awaiting him at the airport in Santiago. President Ricardo Lagos, who had just been sworn in on 11 March, said the retired general's televised arrival had damaged Chile's image, while thousands demonstrated against him.

In June 2000, the Congress passed a new law that granted anonymity to members of the armed forces who provided information on the desaparecidos. Meanwhile, the trials concerning human rights violations during the dictatorship continued. Pinochet was stripped of his parliamentary immunity in August 2000 by the Supreme Court and was indicted by Judge Juan Guzmán Tapia. In 1999, Tapia had ordered the arrest of five military men, including General Pedro Espinoza Bravo of the DINA, for their role in the Caravan of Death following the 11 September coup. Arguing that the bodies of the "disappeared" were still missing, he made jurisprudence which lifted any prescription on the crimes committed by the military. Pinochet's trial continued until his death on 10 December 2006, with alternating indictments for specific cases, lifting of immunities by the Supreme Court or to the contrary immunity from prosecution, with his health as the main argument for, or against, his prosecution. In March 2005, the Supreme Court affirmed Pinochet's immunity concerning the 1974 assassination of General Carlos Prats in Buenos Aires, which had taken place as part of Operation Condor. However, he was deemed fit to stand trial for Operation Colombo, during which 119 political opponents "disappeared" in Argentina. The Chilean justice also lifted his immunity on the Villa Grimaldi case, a detention and torture center on the outskirts of Santiago.

Pinochet, who still benefited from a reputation of righteousness from his supporters, lost legitimacy when he was put under house arrest on tax fraud and passport forgery following the publication of a report concerning the Riggs Bank in July 2004 by the US Senate Permanent Subcommittee on Investigations. The report was a consequence of investigations on financial fundings of the 11 September 2001 attacks in the US. The bank controlled between US$4 million and $8 million of Pinochet's assets, as he lived in Santiago in a modest house, hiding his wealth. According to the report, Riggs Bank participated in money laundering for Pinochet, setting up offshore shell corporations (referring to Pinochet as only "a former public official") and hiding his accounts from regulatory agencies. Related to Pinochet and his family's secret bank accounts in the United States and the Caribbean, this tax fraud filing for an amount of $27 million shocked the conservative sectors who still supported him. Ninety percent of these funds were raised between 1990 and 1998, when Pinochet was chief of the Chilean armed forces, and essentially would have come from weapons trafficking when purchasing Belgian "Mirage" air-fighters in 1994, Dutch "Léopard" tanks, Swiss "Mowag" tanks, or by illegal sales of weapons to Croatia in the middle of the Yugoslav wars. His wife Lucía Hiriart and his son Marco Antonio Pinochet were also sued for complicity. For the fourth time in seven years, Pinochet was indicted by the Chilean justice.

The Chilean authorities took control in August 2005 of the Colonia Dignidad concentration camp, directed by ex-Nazi Paul Schäfer.

== 2005 reform of the 1980 Constitution ==
Over 50 reforms to Pinochet's Constitution were approved in 2005, which eliminated some of the remaining undemocratic areas of the text, such as the existence of non-elected Senators (institutional senators, or senators for life) and the inability of the President to remove the Commander in Chief of the Armed Forces. These reforms led the President to declare Chile's transition to democracy as complete.

== 2020-23 Constitutional replacement process ==
Massive civilian protests started on 18 October 2019, when the Chilean people demanded a new constitution, the ability to end the transition period, and start a real democracy. The protests have hopes of reducing and eliminating social and economic inequality, improving health, education and other public systems, and ending the current pension system (AFP), among other important issues. The appointed 26 April 2020 referendum has been delayed to 25 October due to the COVID-19 pandemic, and the ensuing elections for a Constituent Assembly to write the new constitution have been themselves delayed from 25 October 2020 to 11 April 2021. The elections were moved back to 15–16 May 2021 and completed successfully.

In September 2022, a proposed left-wing replacement constitution was rejected, 62% to 38%. Following a second process, in December 2023, a proposed right-wing replacement was also rejected, 55.8% to 44.2%. These outcomes effectively granted the 1980 charter democratic legitimacy.

== See also ==
- 2006 student protests in Chile
- Hate speech laws in Chile
- Transition to democracy
- No, a film about the 1988 referendum
- Spanish transition to democracy
- Democracy in Venezuela
