= Cristián Reitze =

Chilean politician and businessman

Cristián Reitze Campos
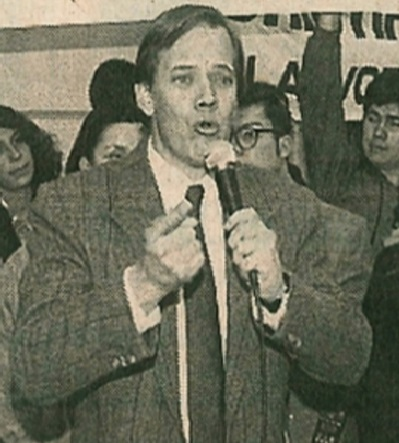
- Cristián Reitze
- Born: 13 March 1950 (age 75)
- Occupation(s): Chilean politician and businessman

Cristián Reitze Campos (13 March 1950) is a Chilean politician and businessman. He is a member of the Humanist Party of Chile (PH) and acted as president of the party. In 1993 he was one of the candidates for the presidency of Chile, representing the Humanist Green Alliance (Alianza Humanista Verde, AHV), but only gained 1.17% of the total valid votes; Eduardo Frei Ruiz-Tagle was eventually elected.

In the 1997 parliamentary elections, he was a candidate for senator for Santiago Poniente. After the elections, he continued to work inside the Humanist Party, and he dedicated himself to his family's business of selling cars.

== Electoral history ==
=== Presidential election, 1993 ===
- 1993 Chilean presidential election

Candidate	Alliance	Party	Votes	%	Result
Eduardo Frei Ruiz-Tagle	Concertación	PDC	4.040.497	57,98	President
Arturo Alessandri Besa	Unión por Chile	Independent	1.701.324	24,41	
José Piñera Echenique	Independent	Right-winged independent	430.950	6,18	
Manfred Max-Neef	Independent	Ecologist	387.102	5,55	
Eugenio Pizarro Poblete	MIDA	Communist Party of Chile	327.402	4,70	
Cristián Reitze Campos	The New Left	Humanist Green Alliance	81.675	1,17	

=== Parliamentary election, 1997 ===
- 1997 Chilean parliamentary election for Santiago Poniente

Candidate	Alliance	Party	Votes	%	Result
Pía Figueroa Edwards	Humanist	PH	14.003	1,26	
Cristián Reitze Campos	Humanist	PH	12.791	1,15	
Jovino Novoa Vásquez	Unión Por Chile	UDI	229.008	20,56	Senator
Ángel Fantuzzi Hernández	Unión Por Chile	RN	153.278	13,76	
Andrés Zaldívar	Concertación por la Democracia	PDC	309.370	27,77	Senator
Camilo Escalona Medina	Concertación por la Democracia	PS	177.965	15,98	
Gladys Marín Millie	The Left	PC	174.780	15,69	
José Miguel Vallejo Knockaert	Chile 2000	ILE	38.038	3,41	
Sergio Santander Sepúlveda	Chile 2000	UCCP	4.733	0,42	
