= List of political parties in Chile =

The political parties of Chile are three clearly categorized, distinct, political groups: the left-wing, the center and the right-wing. Before the 1973 coup, these three political groups were moderately pluralistic and fragmented.

This distinction has existed since the end of the 19th century. Since then, the three groups have been made up of different parties. Each party has had some amount of power in the management of the State or has been represented in the National Congress.

Political parties are recognized legally and formally by Political Constitution of the Republic of Chile of 1980 and by the Organic Constitutional Law of Political Parties of 1987 as organizations that participate in the legal political system and contribute to guiding public opinion.

== Political parties ==
This article lists political parties in Chile. Chile has a multi-party system.

=== Active ===
As of July 2026 there are 15 legally constituted political parties in Chile.

Party/Alliance	Abbr.	Est.	Position	International affiliation	Governors	Senators	Deputies	Regional advisors	Mayors	Councilors
Unity for Chile; Unidad por Chile	UpCh	2022	Centre-left to left-wing	None	8 / 16	17 / 50	46 / 155	121 / 302	65 / 345	960 / 2,256
Democratic Socialism; Socialismo Democrático	SD	2021	Centre-left	None	3 / 16	12 / 50	21 / 155	58 / 302	35 / 345	552 / 2,256
Socialist Party; Partido Socialista de Chile	PS	1933	Centre-left to left-wing	PA, SI	3 / 16	7 / 50	11 / 155	30 / 302	22 / 345	215 / 2,256
Party for Democracy; Partido por la Democracia	PPD	1987	Centre-left	PA, SI	0 / 16	4 / 50	10 / 155	18 / 302	8 / 345	159 / 2,256
Radical Party (Note: The Party does not currently exist as it did not reach either the threshold of elected representatives nor the minimum percentage of votes needed to exist in the 2025 Parliamentary Election, but still there are representatives who brand themselves with the Party's emblems.); Partido Radical de Chile	PR	1863	Centre-left	PA, SI	1 / 16	0 / 50	0 / 155	9 / 302	5 / 345	49 / 2,256
Liberal Party (Note: Operates only in AP, TA, AN, VA, RM, ML NB, BI, AR, and LL.); Partido Liberal de Chile	PL	2013	Centre-left	LI	0 / 16	1 / 50	4 / 155	1 / 302	1 / 345	21 / 2,256
Christian Democratic Party; Partido Demócrata Cristiano	PDC	1957	Centre to centre-left	CDI	0 / 16	3 / 50	10 / 155	29 / 302	23 / 345	162 / 2,256
Communist Party; Partido Comunista de Chile	PCCh	1922	Left-wing to far-left	IMCWP	0 / 16	3 / 50	12 / 155	15 / 302	2 / 345	105 / 2,256
Broad Front (Note: A fusion of Democratic Revolution and Social Convergence parties.); Frente Amplio	FA	2024	Left-wing	None	0 / 16	2 / 50	18 / 155	19 / 302	5 / 345	141 / 2,256
Let's go Chile; Chile Vamos	ChV	2015	Centre-right to right-wing	None	6 / 16	15 / 50	36 / 155	96 / 302	66 / 345	835 / 2,256
National Renewal; Renovación Nacional	RN	1987	Centre-right to right-wing	IDU, CDI	2 / 16	10 / 50	16 / 155	55 / 302	38 / 345	444 / 2,256
Independent Democratic Union; Unión Demócrata Independiente	UDI	1983	Right-wing	IDU	2 / 16	5 / 50	18 / 155	37 / 302	22 / 345	353 / 2,256
Political Evolution; Evolución Política	EVO	2012	Centre-right	LI	0 / 16	2 / 50	2 / 155	12 / 302	8 / 345	61 / 2,256
Republican Party; Partido Republicano de Chile	PRCh	2019	Far-right	None	0 / 16	5 / 50	11 / 155	59 / 302	3 / 345	233 / 2,256
National Libertarian Party (Note: Operates in all regions except AY.); Partido Nacional Libertario	PNL	2024	Far-right	None	0 / 16	1 / 50	8 / 155	1 / 302	0 / 345	0 / 2,256
Party of the People; Partido de la Gente	PDG	2019	Centre-right to right-wing	None	0 / 16	0 / 50	14 / 155	3 / 302	0 / 345	23 / 2,256
Social Green Regionalist Federation; Federación Regionalista Verde Social	FRVS	2017	Centre-left to left-wing	None	0 / 16	1 / 50	2 / 155	4 / 302	3 / 345	63 / 2,256

=== Minor political movements ===
- Chilean Communist Party (Proletarian Action) (Partido Comunista Chileno (Acción Proletaria))
- Libertarian Left (Izquierda Libertaria)

=== Historical ===
- Liberal Party (Partido Liberal) (existed 1849–1966)
- Conservative Party (Partido Conservador) (existed 1851–1949, 1953–1966)
- National Party (Partido Nacional) (existed 1857–1933)
- Democrat Party (Partido Demócrata) (existed 1887–1941)
- Liberal Democratic Party (Partido Liberal Democrático) (existed 1893–1933)
- Democratic Party (Partido Democrático) (existed 1932–1960)
- National Socialist Movement of Chile (Movimiento Nacional Socialista de Chile) (existed 1932–1941)
- Agrarian Labor Party (Partido Agrario Laborista) (existed 1945–1958)
- National Democratic Party (Partido Democrático Nacional) (existed 1960–1999)
- New Democratic Left (founded and dissolved in 1963)
- Socialist Democratic Party (Partido Democrático Socialista) (existed 1964–1965)
- Revolutionary Communist Party (Partido Comunista Revolucionario) (existed 1966–1981)
- National Party (Partido Nacional) (existed 1966–1973, 1983–1994)
- Popular Unitary Action Movement (Movimiento de Acción Popular Unitario or MAPU) (existed 1969–1994)
- Radical Democracy (Democracia Radical) (existed 1969–1990)
- Chilean Social Democracy Party (Partido Socialdemocracia Chilena) (existed 1971–1994)
- Citizen Left (Izquierda Cristiana or Izquierda Ciudadana) (existed 1971–2018)
- National Advance (Avanzada Nacional) (existed 1983–1990)
- Party of the South (Partido del Sur) (existed 1987–1998)
- The Greens (Los Verdes) (existed 1987–1990, 1995–2001)
- Broad Party of Socialist Left (Partido Amplio de Izquierda Socialista or PAIS) (existed 1988–1990)
- Liberal Party (Partido Liberal) (existed 1988–1994)
- Humanist Green Alliance (Alianza Humanista Verde) (existed 1990–1995)
- Union of the Centrist Center (Unión de Centro Centro) (existed 1990–2002)
- National Alliance of Independents (Alianza Nacional de los Independientes) (existed 2001–2006)
- Regionalist Action Party of Chile (Partido de Acción Regionalista de Chile) (existed 2003–2006)
- Independent Regionalist Party (Partido Regionalista Independiente) (existed 2006–2018)
- Broad Social Movement (Movimiento Amplio Social) (existed 2008–2018)
- Progressive Party (Partido Progresista) (existed 2009–2022)
- Amplitude (Amplitud) (existed 2014–2018)
- Citizen Power (Poder Ciudadano) (existed 2015–2019)
- Citizens (Ciudadanos) (existed 2015–2022)
- Common Force (Fuerza Común) (existed 2020–2022)
- Comunes (Comunes) (existed 2019-2024)
- Democratic Revolution (Revolución Democrática) (existed 2012-2024)
- Social Convergence (Convergencia Social) (existed 2019-2024)
- Christian Social Party (Partido Social Cristiano) (Existed 2022-2026)
- Green Ecologist Party (Partido Ecologista Verde) (Existed 2006-2026)
- Democrats (Demócratas) (Existed 2022-2026)
- Equality Party (Partido Igualdad) (2022–2026)
- Humanist Action (Acción Humanista) (2020–2026)
- Humanist Party (Partido Humanista) (1984–2026)
- People's Party (Partido Popular) (2022–2026)
- Popular Green Alliance Party (Partido Alianza Verde Popular) (2022–2026)
- Revolutionary Workers' Party (Partido de Trabajadores Revolucionarios) (2017–2026)

== Alliances ==
=== Active ===
==== Major Coalitions ====
- Change for Chile (Cambio por Chile), composed of:
  - Republican Party of Chile
  - National Libertarian Party
- Great and United Chile (Chile Grande y Unido), composed of:
  - Chile Vamos, composed of:
    - Independent Democratic Union (Unión Demócrata Independiente)
    - National Renewal (Renovación Nacional)
    - Evòpoli
- Unity for Chile (Unidad por Chile)
  - Broad Front (Frente Amplio)
  - Christian Democratic Party (Partido Demócrata Cristiano)
  - Communist Party of Chile (Partido Comunista de Chile)
  - Democratic Socialism (Socialismo Democrático), composed of:
    - Liberal Party of Chile (Partido Liberal de Chile)
    - Party for Democracy (Partido por la Democracia)
    - Socialist Party of Chile (Partido Socialista de Chile)
    - Radical Party of Chile (Partido Radical de Chile)
    - New Deal (Nuevo Trato)

==== Minor Coalitions ====
- Greens, Regionalists and Humanists
  - Humanist Action
  - FREVS
- Popular Ecologist, Animalist, and Humanist Left
  - Humanist Party
  - Equality Party
  - Libertarian Left

=== Historical ===
- Broad Front
- Dignity Now
- New Social Pact
- United Independents
- Christian Social Front
- Popular Front
- Democratic Alliance
- Popular Unity
- Confederation of Democracy
- Coalition of Parties for Democracy
- Alliance
- Coalition for Change
- Together We Can Do More
- New Majority
- Approve Dignity

== History of Chile's political parties ==
=== Origins and the first blocks (1810–1860) ===
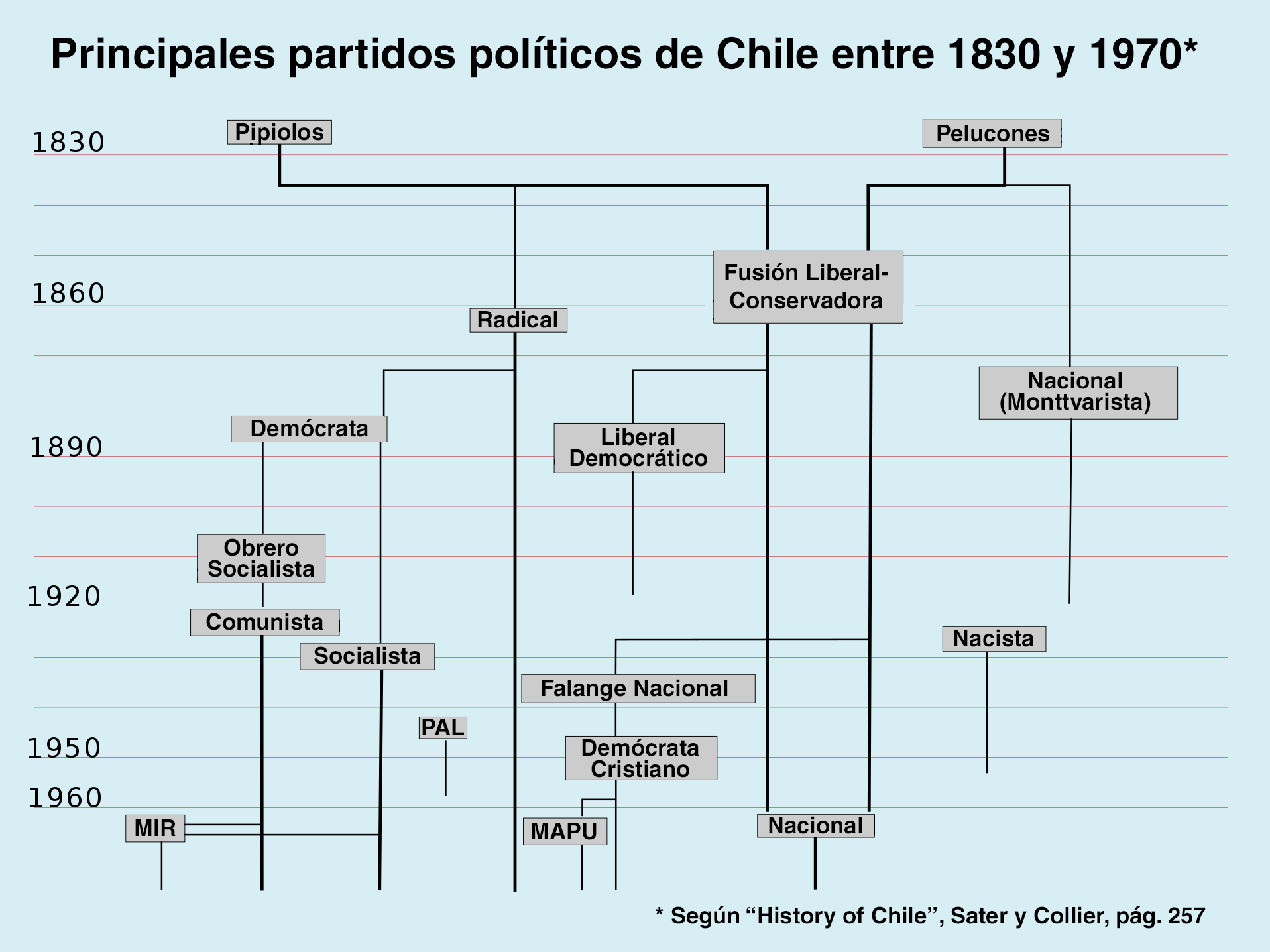
Principal political parties in Ch 1830 and 1970

In Chile, the first political groups were created during the Independence of Chile: the Royalists and the Patriots. The Royalists wanted to maintain the status quo with the King of Spain, while the Patriots wanted to gain a larger degree of freedom. In turn, the Patriots further split into the Moderates, who wanted a slow pace of reform, and the Radicals or Extremists, who favored a much faster pace. All of the early political groups were shy of advocating for full independence since it was unknown if the King would regain his power from Napoleon.

Once Chile gained independence, many political groupings emerged. They were based on various popular leaders during that time, instead of common political ideas. Two very strong political groupings were the Pipolos (liberals) and the Pelucónes (conservatives). Two minor parties, the O’Higginists and the Tobacconists, were often on the Pelucónes' side. After Diego Portales Palazuelos became the architect of the New Institution and the Constitution of 1833, the Pelucónes prevailed for thirty years (1831–1861).

From 1831 to 1861, the prevailing political system was one in which the President co-opted a successor. This system greatly influenced the idea that power should be transferred between members of the ruling political faction. It was only the "Question of the Sacristan" (1856), which divided The Pelucónes, allowed for the rise of the Liberals to power in 1861.

=== Dominance of the traditional parties (1860–1920) ===
The formal emergence of political parties in Chilean institutions occurred around the 1850s. Chileans began to challenge the President as the leading role in national political life through the National Congress. In 1891, the disagreement was resolved after a Civil War, in favor of a parliamentary system.

Around that time, the rise of the middle class would eventually lead to the creation of the Radical Party. Their campaign started in the 1850s, as a group defending the interests of the silver mine owners, but it would gradually shift its focus to the employees of the growing state bureaucracy. Soon afterwards, from the same branch of radicalism, the Democratic Party appeared. It was a community that was born closer to the working class segment of society, but that over time would join the game of alliances within the rest of the party system.

After the Chilean Civil War of 1891, the political system began to embody elements of a parliamentary system. Hence, the political coalitions became very strong. Although around twenty distinct political parties and movements existed, Chilean politics was structured around two large groups: the Liberal Alliance (of Liberal and Progressive tendency) and the Coalition (Conservative, Catholics). At the same time, political parties, formerly tools of the upper-class, expanded to include the thriving middle and working classes too.

=== Expansion of political parties (1920–1973) ===
With the rise of immigration from Europe, workers with anarchist and socialist ideas came to Chile. Additionally, in the mid-19 century, the union movement began in the nitrate fields of the north of Chile through a surge of the joint labor unions. It is from these processes that in 1912, the Workers' Socialist Party was founded in Iquique by the typographer Luis Emilio Recabarren and 30 union workers and employees. The Workers' Socialist Party is defined as the political party of the Chilean working class. In 1922, the party joined the Third Communist International. Since that date, the party has been known as the Communist Party of Chile.

In the period between 1920 and 1938 (between the start of the first presidential term of Arturo Alessandri Palma and the end of his second term) a series of political incidents led to the loss of the importance of traditional nineteenth-century parties, but for the benefit of the "party masses".

The splendor of this new type of political party would come with the three presidential terms of the Radical Party between 1938 and 1952. At that time, the Radical Party (the faction of the middle class, par excellence), transformed into a large body of positions and political favors, which in the long run would lead to its discredit. Its place as an intermediate political group—between the right and the left—would be taken by the Christian Democratic Party. The Christian Democratic Party is the successor of the National Falange, which in turn had split from the declining Conservative Party after the victory of Eduardo Frei Montalva (1964–1970). Regarding political parties, their main characteristic between 1938 and 1973 was their structuring into the classic "three-thirds" system (right, center, and left).

With Salvador Allende, the Popular Unity came to power as a vast political coalition composed of elements from the center and the left. However, the Military Coup of 1973 signified not only the disappearance of the Popular Unity, but the breakdown of the party system and its end during most of the dictatorship of Augusto Pinochet. Only in the last year of the military dictatorship was the Organic Constitutional Law of Political Parties enacted, which regulated their formation and function.

=== Proscription of parties and reorganization (1973–1990) ===
Between 1973 and 1987, Chilean political parties were prohibited. On October 8, 1973, the members of the Popular Unity were banned and three days later, the rest of the political parties and movements were declared adjourned, and definitively dissolved on March 12, 1977.

On October 1, 1996, the Organic Constitutional Law was published in the Legal Gazette, which re-established the system of electoral registrations and created the Electoral Service of Chile (Servel) as a replacement for the former Directorate of the Electoral Registry. On March 23, 1987, the Organic Constitutional Law of Political Parties was published—which established its objectives, requirements for legalization and the internal organization between others—with which the groups began procedures for their legal recognition.

The National Party was the first political organization to be legally recognized by the Servel on December 23, 1987, inscribed officially in the registry on January 4, 1988. In the following months—before the Plebiscite of October 5, 1988—the National Advance, Humanist, National Renewal, Radical Democracy, Socialist, Christian Democratic (CDP), Party for Democracy, Party of the South, Radical and Green parties were legalized.

=== Return to democracy (1990–2022) ===
With the restoration of Democracy in 1990, the prominent political coalition was the Concertación de Partidos por la Democracia (Coalition of Parties for Democracy), a center-left group initially founded by 17 parties, of which the most important, which remained in the coalition throughout the years, were: The Christian Democratic Party, the Socialist Party, the Party for Democracy and the Radical Party. The "Concertación" governed Chile throughout the presidencies of Patricio Aylwin (1990–1994), Eduardo Frei Ruiz-Tagle (1994–2000), Ricardo Lagos (2000–2006) and Michelle Bachelet (2006–2010). The opponent of the ruling coalition, was the Alianza (Alliance). The Alliance was a group of center-right parties, formed by the main parties that supported the "YES" option in the 1988 plebiscite. Extra-parliamentarily, there was the leftist coalition Juntos Podemos Más (Together we can do more), formed by the Communist Party, Humanist Party, PC-AP and others left-wing movements, this coalition did not achieve great electoral results due to the binomial system, which favoured the Concertacion and the alliance.

The "Alliance" came to power when Sebastián Piñera (2010–2014) assumed office. In 2013, after electoral losses, the "Concertación", with the intention of renewing its image, decided to make an agreement with the Communist Party, the Citizen Left, and the MAS Region, creating the New Majority. This coalition won comfortable victories in the 2013 elections and achieved re-election of Michelle Bachelet between 2014 and 2018. In turn, the parties that made up the Alliance, regrouped in 2015 in a new coalition denominated Chile Vamos (Let's go Chile).

In 2016, the number of political parties in Chile doubled, increasing from 14 to 32. It came as a precursor to the municipal elections of the year and the Parliamentary Elections of 2017, given that they will be the first to be held under the new proportional electoral system, the replacement for the binomial system. The binomial system favoured the existence of two blocks to the detriment of isolated parties and independent candidates. In that election, the Frente Amplio (Broad Front) appeared, a coalition that brought together left-wing sectors, which surprisingly won the election of 20 deputies. In the presidential election, Sebastián Piñera was able to return to the government and establish Chile Vamos (Let's go Chile) as an official coalition between 2018 and 2022.

=== Constitutional Convention and reorganization of coalitions (2022–present) ===
After the social outburst of 2019, a plebiscite was held that defined the drafting of a new constitution through a Constitutional Convention. The members of that body were elected in May 2021, in a process that benefited independents over political party militants. The most successful group of independents was The List of the People.

From that election, the coalition Apruebo Dignidad (I Approve Dignity) emerged, which gathered the coalitions Frente Amplio (Broad Front) and Chile Digno (Worthy Chile). This group supported the presidential candidacy of Gabriel Boric, who after winning in the ballot decided to summon the Socialist, For Democracy, Radical and Liberal parties to the government, which were grouped in a coalition called Democratic Socialism. This implied the definitive break of the former Concertación/New Majority with the Christian Democratic Party, which was not invited to the new administration.

From the right-wing emerged the Republican Party, which in the parliamentary elections achieved the election of 14 deputies and one senator, facing the traditional center-right grouped in Chile Vamos, which from 2022 went to the opposition after the end of Piñera's government. Other blocks also emerged in those elections, such as the conservative liberal Partido de la gente (Party of the people).

== See also ==
- Lists of political parties
- Timeline of liberal and radical parties in Chile

== Notes and references ==
=== Bibliography ===
- Cruz-Coke, Ricardo. 1952. Geografía electoral. Santiago de Chile.
- Donoso, Ricardo. 1946. Las ideas políticas en Chile. Fondo de Cultura Económica. México D.F.
- Edwards, Alberto, y Eduardo Frei. 1949. Historia de la los partidos políticos chilenos. Editorial del Pacífico. Santiago de Chile.
- Friedmann, Reinhard. 1988. 1964–1988 La política chilena de la A a la Z. Melquíades. Santiago de Chile. ISBN 956-231-027-2
- Fuentes, Jordi, y Lía Cortés. 1967. Diccionario político de Chile, 1800–1966'. Santiago de Chile
- Gil, Federico G. 1969, El sistema político de Chile. Editorial Andrés Bello. Santiago de Chile.
- Guilisasti Tagle, Sergio. 1964. Partidos políticos chilenos. Editorial Nascimento. Santiago de Chile.
- Kushner, Harvey: Encyclopedia of Terrorism. California: Sage Publications Ltd., 2003.- ISBN 0-7619-2408-6
- León Echaiz, René. 1939. Evolución histórica de los partidos políticos chilenos. Editorial del Pacífico.
- Urzúa Valenzuela, Germán. 1979. Diccionario político institucional de Chile. Editorial Ariete. Santiago de Chile.
- Urzúa Valenzuela, Germán. 1992. Historia política de Chile y su evolución electoral. Desde 1810 a 1992. Editorial Jurídica de Chile. Santiago de Chile. ISBN 956-10-0957-9

=== External links ===
- Servicio Electoral de Chile
