= 1997 Chilean parliamentary election =

← 1993	11 December 1997	2001 →
- Chamber of Deputies
- All 120 seats in the Chamber of Deputies
Party	Vote %	Seats	+/–
Concertación	50.51	69	−1
Union for Chile	36.26	47	−1
Chile 2000	2.14	2	0
Independents	0.69	2	+2
This lists parties that won seats. See the complete results below.
- Senate
- 20 of the 48 seats in the Senate
Party	Vote %	Seats	+/–
Concertación	49.88	20	−1
Union for Chile	36.64	17	+1
Chile 2000	2.62	1	0
This lists parties that won seats. See the complete results below.

Parliamentary elections were held in Chile on 11 December 1997. The Concert of Parties for Democracy alliance maintained its majority in both the Chamber of Deputies and the Senate.

== Results ==
=== Senate ===
Party or alliance		Votes	%	Seats			
Party or alliance		Votes	%	Won	Not up	Total	+/–
Concertación	Christian Democratic Party	1,238,540	29.22	10	4	14	+1
Concertación	Socialist Party of Chile	617,947	14.58	1	3	4	–1
Concertación	Party for Democracy	182,076	4.29	0	2	2	0
Concertación	Social Democrat Radical Party	76,091	1.79	0	0	0	–1
Concertación	Total	2,114,654	49.88	11	9	20	–1
Union for Chile	Independent Democratic Union	728,680	17.19	2	3	5	+2
Union for Chile	National Renewal	629,394	14.85	3	4	7	–4
Union for Chile	Independents	195,118	4.60	4	1	5	+3
Union for Chile	Total	1,553,192	36.64	9	8	17	+1
The Left	Communist Party of Chile	357,825	8.44	0	0	0	0
The Left	Independents	8,406	0.20	0	0	0	0
The Left	Total	366,231	8.64	0	0	0	0
Chile 2000	Progressive Union of the Centrist Center	18,023	0.43	0	1	1	0
Chile 2000	Independents	93,150	2.20	0	0	0	–
Chile 2000	Total	111,173	2.62	0	1	1	–
Humanist Party		94,116	2.22	0	0	0	0
Appointed senators				9	0	9	+1
Former presidents				1	0	1	+1
Total		4,239,366	100.00	30	18	48	+2
Valid votes		4,239,366	83.08				
Invalid/blank votes		863,540	16.92				
Total votes		5,102,906	100.00				
Registered voters/turnout		5,794,935	88.06				
Source: Nohlen, SERVEL, IPU

=== Chamber of Deputies ===
Party or alliance		Votes	%	Seats	+/–
Concertación	Christian Democratic Party	1,331,745	22.98	38	+1
Concertación	Party for Democracy	727,293	12.55	16	+1
Concertación	Socialist Party of Chile	640,397	11.05	11	–4
Concertación	Social Democratic Radical Party	181,538	3.13	4	+2
Concertación	Independents	46,719	0.81	0	–1
Concertación	Total	2,927,692	50.51	69	–1
Union for Chile	National Renewal	971,903	16.77	23	–6
Union for Chile	Independent Democratic Union	837,736	14.45	17	+2
Union for Chile	Party of the South	20,813	0.36	1	+1
Union for Chile	Independents	270,940	4.67	6	+2
Union for Chile	Total	2,101,392	36.26	47	–1
The Left	Communist Party of Chile	398,588	6.88	0	0
The Left	New People's Alliance	8,971	0.15	0	New
The Left	Independents	26,589	0.46	0	0
The Left	Total	434,148	7.49	0	0
Humanist Party		168,597	2.91	0	0
Chile 2000	Progressive Union of the Centrist Center	68,822	1.19	2	0
Chile 2000	Independents	55,100	0.95	0	–
Chile 2000	Total	123,922	2.14	2	0
Independents		40,022	0.69	2	+2
Total		5,795,773	100.00	120	0
Valid votes		5,795,773	82.25		
Invalid/blank votes		1,250,578	17.75		
Total votes		7,046,351	100.00		
Registered voters/turnout		8,077,743	87.23		
Source: SERVEL
