= Humanist International =

Political international adhering to humanism

The Humanist International (also known as the International Humanist Party) is a consortium of political parties adhering to universal humanism founded in 1952.

The five basic principles of Humanist International are:

1. The value of human life as the central value, above money and power, etc.
2. Equality of all human beings.
3. Freedom of belief and ideas.
4. Development and creation of alternative economic models to the current neoliberal one.
5. Methodology of active non-violence.

== History ==
Humanist International was founded in Florence, Italy, on January 4, 1989, by the approval of foundational documents and statutes by over 40 Humanist Parties from around the world. These foundational documents included the Universal Declaration of Human Rights, a declaration of principles, a thesis and a basis for political action.

The second congress of the Humanist International was held in Moscow in October 1993. In this meeting, the document of the Humanist Movement was added to the foundational documents.

In January and July 1999, the Humanist International launched the regional bodies of Latin America and Europe respectively. Africa and Asia are in the process of forming their own regional bodies.

In December 1989, in Chile, Laura Rodríguez became the first elected representative of any Humanist Party in the world after winning a seat as part of the Concertación coalition, after Augusto Pinochet handed over power.

The Argentine Humanist Party won a seat in the Deliberative Council in Santa Rosa, La Pampa in 2015.

The Chilean Humanist Party was a part of the Broad Front coalition for the 2017 parliamentary elections. The coalition won 20 seats in the Chamber of Deputies, three of which went to the Humanist Party.

== Member parties ==
- Humanist Party (Argentina)
- Humanist Party (Chile)
- Humanist Party (Iceland)
- Humanist Party (Italy)
- Humanist Party (Spain)
- Humanist Party of Angola

=== Defunct member parties ===
- Romanian Humanist Party
- Humanist Party (Czech Republic)
- Humanist Party (Denmark)
- Humanist Party (Hungary)
- Humanist Party (Portugal)
- Humanist Party of Ontario
- Humanist Party of Switzerland
- Paraguayan Humanist Party
- Humanist Party of Quebec
