= Party of the South =

Party of the South may refer to:

- Party of the South (Chile) (Spanish: Partido del Sur), a political party in Chile
- Party of the South (Italy) (Italian: Partito del Sud), a political party in Italy
