= Binomial voting system =

Semi-proportional electoral system

The binomial system (Spanish: Sistema binominal) is a voting system that was used in the legislative elections of Chile between 1989 and 2013. The system utilizes the D'Hondt method with an open list where every constituency returns two (hence the name) representatives to the legislative body. The fact that only two candidates are elected in each district results in the peculiarity where the second most supported list is over-represented. Its use was prescribed in the respective constitutional organic law during the Pinochet regime. The binomial system was considered by most analysts as the main constitutional lock that prevented completion of the Chilean transition to democracy.

It was invented in the 1980s in the Polish People's Republic in order to foster political "stability" in the democratization process, maintaining the preeminence of the Polish United Workers' Party against the rise of the opposition movement Solidarity, as a system that promoted consensus and negotiation between opposing sides of government.

== Name and similar methods ==
The term binomial system refers to the dual-member districts the system uses. Within these districts, the apportionment method (between parties, not candidates) is technically proportional, but because of the small district magnitude it is across the whole assembly, semi-proportional. In practice, because there are only two seats and Chile operates under a two-party system, the rule behaves like a power-sharing agreement where the two major parties each take maximum half the seats in the legislature (unless in enough districts the larger party can win with a landslide - in this case double the number of votes as the runner-up party).

The binomial system is also distinct from biproportional apportionment, despite the similarity in name, although it is technically proportional both geographically and within districts, biproportional systems used a unified algorithm for determining how many seats each region gets and to achieve party proportionality on the whole, based on the votes cast.

It is also not to be confused with the dual-member mixed proportional (DMP) system, often shortened to dual-member proportional, a system invented in 2013 (the same year the binomial system was abolished in Chile). This method is different from the binomial system, being a mixed system which provides mixed-member proportional representation by allocating the first seat by plurality, and the second within the compensation mechanism (based on the national or regional popular vote). Under DMP, a voter can vote for pairs of candidates on their ballot, functioning as a closed list locally, but as a best loser system for compensation.

== Characteristics ==
The system works in the following manner: Parties and independent candidates group themselves into lists or coalitions, basically electoral blocs. Each list proposes up to two candidates per electoral region, province, or other geographical unit. Votes are first tallied by list instead of by candidate, and unless the list which obtained a majority has double the voting as the second most supported list, each of the two lists gets one of their candidates, the one who got the most voting, into office. In other words, the binomial system basically means that the first (relative majority i.e.: plurality) and the second largest party get equal representation unless the plurality doubles the second. For example, in the following cases the candidate that would get elected under a binomial system are marked with an [e]:

Lists	Cases
Lists	Case 1	Case 2	Case 3	Case 4
List 1	40%	50%	60%	39%
Candidate 1A	30% [e]	30% [e]	50% [e]	20% [e]
Candidate 1B	10%	20%	10% [e]	19%
List 2	40%	30%	30%	33%
Candidate 2A	22% [e]	18% [e]	18%	18% [e]
Candidate 2B	18%	12%	12%	15%
List 3	20%	20%	10%	28%
Candidate 3A	11%	11%	6%	26%
Candidate 3B	9%	9%	4%	2%

The most common case is Case 2, in which one list gets a total voting that is higher than the other but both get exactly the same number of candidates elected, candidates 1A and 2A respectively. In the unlikely case that both lists get exactly the same number of votes each gets a candidate into office. Only in the case that List 1 doubles the voting of List 2 will List 1 be able to get two seats, even if, like in Case 3, the second elected candidate of the most supported list received the fewest votes of all the candidates of the two majorities. The system makes it difficult for minority parties to elect candidates: in Case 4, candidate 3A receives the most votes, but under the binomial system, candidates 1A and 2A will be elected.

As can be seen, the binomial system acts to equalize the representation of the second largest party to the point of making it roughly equal, or only slightly smaller, than that of the party winning at least a plurality. Furthermore, it acts to exclude any minority from the process, in practice generating a locked two-party, or two-bloc, system in which it is exceedingly difficult for one of the blocs to get an upper hand on the other. The table below posits the electoral results of the 2005 lower chamber parliamentary elections with three different voting systems.

Election Type	Coalitions and Movements							
Election Type	Concertación Democrática (centre-left)		Alianza(right wing conservatives)		Juntos Podemos Más, (left wing progressives, ecologists, and others)		Fuerza Regional Independiente, (regionalist movement)	
Binomial	65 dip.	54.2%	54 dip.	45.0%	0 dip.	0.0%	1 dip.	0.83%
Direct Election	69 dip.	57.5%	50 dip.	41.6%	0 dip.	0.0%	1 dip.	0.83%
Proportional System	62 dip.	51.6%	46 dip.	38.3%	9 dip.	7.5%	1 dip.	0.83%

== Rationale ==
The binomial system, proponents argue, acts to stabilize the political situation by making it almost impossible for a single political bloc or coalition to make important choices in a one-sided manner. This in turn leads to great political stability and prevents the emergence of the long-term personality-centered populist regimes that have been common throughout the history of Latin America. It has also been argued that it fosters consensus-building, debate and negotiation. Finally the point of representation is often cited in defense of the binomial system, as it provides a representation to the big minority that first-past-the-post systems don't.

== Criticism ==
Critics of this system argue that it makes for a flawed democracy, as it does not necessarily elect the candidate who received the most votes. Furthermore, it effectively excludes the smaller political forces that are not a part of either of the two big electoral alliances.

== Bibliography ==
- Siavelis, Peter M.: La lógica oculta de la selección de candidatos en las elecciones parlamentarias chilenas", en Estudios Públicos, No.98 (2005), pp. 189-225.
- Von Baer, Ena: "Sistema Binomial: Consensos y disensos, en Reforma al Sistema Binomial chileno
