= Humanist Green Alliance =

Humanist Green Alliance Alianza Humanista Verde
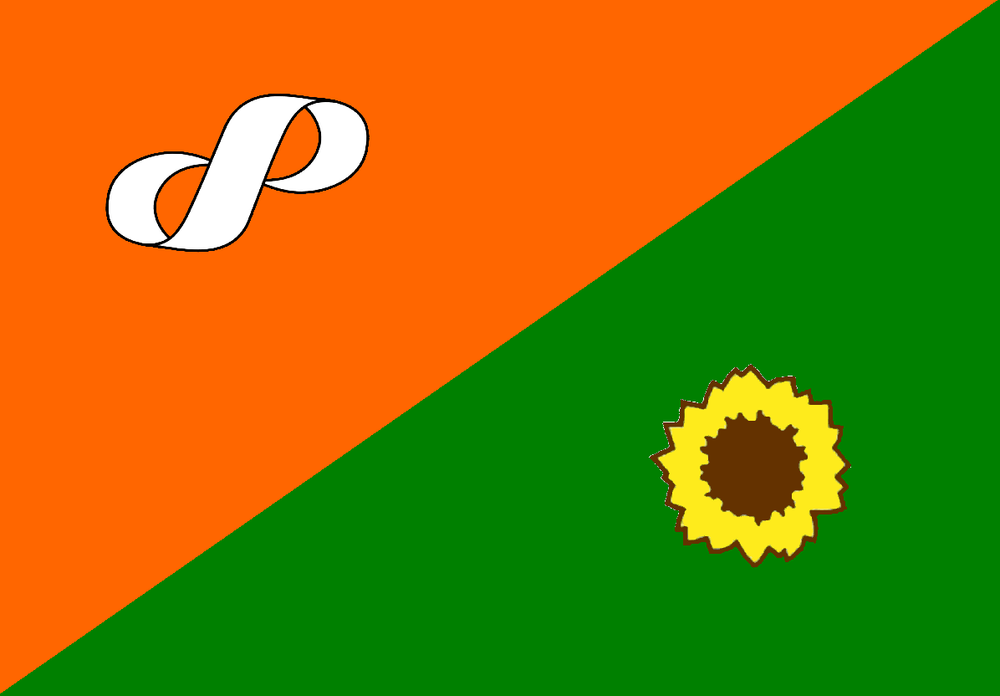
- Founded: 1990
- Dissolved: 1995
- Merger of: Humanist Party; The Greens
- Succeeded by: Humanist Party
- Headquarters: Santiago, Chile
- Ideology: Humanism; Green politics
- Political position: Centre-left

The Humanist Green Alliance (Spanish: Alianza Humanista Verde, AHV) was a Chilean political party formed in 1990 by the Humanist Party and The Greens. In 1995, it was called the Humanist Party (PH).

== History ==
It was founded on May 4, 1990, through the merger of the Humanist Party and The Greens, whose constitution established its principles:

The upholding of the democratic regime as a form of transition from formal democracy to real democracy. On the other hand, explicitly rejects the violation of human rights, the use of violence as a method of conflict resolution and personal concentration of power. With respect to the methodology of action, expressly confirms that no action governed by – violent. Consider the suffering of the people as a fact produced by economic violence. Therefore proclaims the need to strengthen any social organization that counteracts this situation.

In its early years he was part of the ruling Concertación, and joined his list in municipal elections in 1992, where the party obtained 52,481 votes, equivalent to 0.82% of the vote, and their 24 candidates had 15 elected councilors, including Efrén Osorio for San Bernardo; and a mayor, Pablo Vergara Loyola for Ñuñoa.

In 1993 they decide to withdraw from the Concertación coalition and formed along the Ecologist Movement, the "New Left" list in the parliamentary elections of that year, besides presenting Cristián Reitze, a party member, as a presidential candidate. In parliamentary elections, the party won just over 1% of the total votes in the vote of deputies, without getting any elected.

June 3, 1994, it merged with the Ecologist Movement. Finally, the Green Humanist Alliance returned to the name of the Humanist Party in December 1995.
