= Francisco Javier Errázuriz =

Francisco Javier Errázuriz may refer to:

- Francisco Javier Errázuriz Ossa, Chilean Catholic cardinal
- Francisco Javier Errázuriz Talavera, Chilean politician
