= New People's Alliance =

New People's Alliance Nueva Alianza Popular
- Founded: 1995
- Dissolved: 1998
- Split from: Socialist Party of Chile
- Merged into: Communist Party of Chile
- Headquarters: Santiago de Chile
- Ideology: Socialism; Marxism
- Political position: Left-wing

The New People's Alliance (Spanish: Nueva Alianza Popular, NAP) was a Chilean political party of Marxist ideology, which took legal existence between 1997 and 1998.

The party was founded on October 24, 1995, and was registered as a party in formation before the Electoral Service of Chile on January 30, 1996, from a split of the Socialist Party of Chile (PS). It was officially registered as a legal political party on September 13, 1996. The following year, in 1997, the party formed, along with the Communist Party of Chile (PCCh), the electoral pact "The Left" (La Izquierda) for the parliamentary elections. In that election the party presented eight candidates for deputy, but none of them was elected and won 8,971 votes, with 0.15%. Because the vote garnered less required by law to maintain the status of a legal political party, the Electoral Service of Chile dissolved the New People's Alliance June 23, 1998, and many of its members joined the Communist Party of Chile.
