= The Greens (Chile) =

Defunct political party in Chile

The Greens Los Verdes
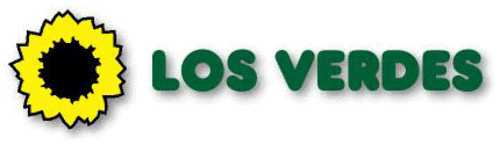
- Founded: 1987
- Dissolved: 1990
- Merged into: Humanist Green Alliance
- Headquarters: Santiago, Chile
- Ideology: Green politics Environmentalism; Political ecology
- Political position: Centre-left
- National affiliation: Concertación (1988-1990)

The Greens (Spanish: Los Verdes) was an ecologist political party of Chile, existent from 1987 to 1990, when merged with the Humanist Party into the Humanist Green Alliance.

In the mid 1980s, Chilean environmental groups begin to participate in political activity through the Future Green ecopacifistas groups, inspired by the Community for Human Development, cultural wing of the Humanist Movement in the country. After two years of activism, they decided in 1987 constituted as a political party, taking the name of "The Greens". Its leaders were environmentalists Andrés Koryzma (who took over as president), Mario Aguilar and Ana L'Homme.

In 1989 form part of the "International Green" created in Rio de Janeiro, Brazil, and after having supported the opposition bloc the military regime of Augusto Pinochet in the 1988 plebiscite, on the list of the Concertación for the parliamentary elections of 1989, where they have two candidates; however, none was elected, and low vote (0.22%) subsequently forced to merge with the Humanist Party, constituting the Humanist-Green Alliance (AHV).
