= Humanist Party of Switzerland =

Political party in Switzerland

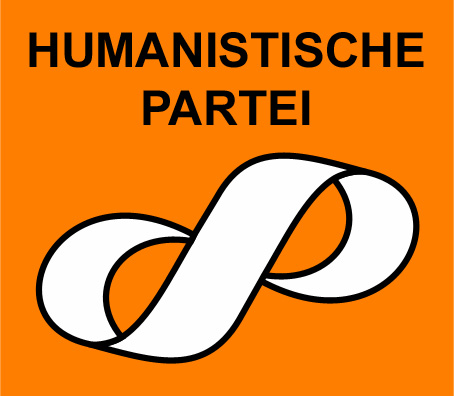
The logo of the party

The Humanist Party of Switzerland (German: Humanistische Partei der Schweiz, French: Parti humaniste suisse, Italian: Partito umanista svizzero, Romansh: Partida umanistica svizra) was a political party in Switzerland, which pursues the political ideas of New Humanism. The party was active at the beginning only in the canton of Zurich, but has been extended to national status in 1999. It never had great electoral success, and it failed to gain seats anywhere.

== History ==
The party was founded in 1984 and participated in local elections in the canton of Zurich in 1986 and 1987. It also took part in the Humanist Internationals in Florence in 1989 and in Moscow in 1992. In 1989 the party participated in local elections outside Zurich, namely in the canton of Aargau.

On 15 May 1999, the party held its first national congress in Bern and extended to national status. The section of Basel has been dissolved since 17 July 2004.
