= 1989 Chilean constitutional referendum =

- 30 July 1989
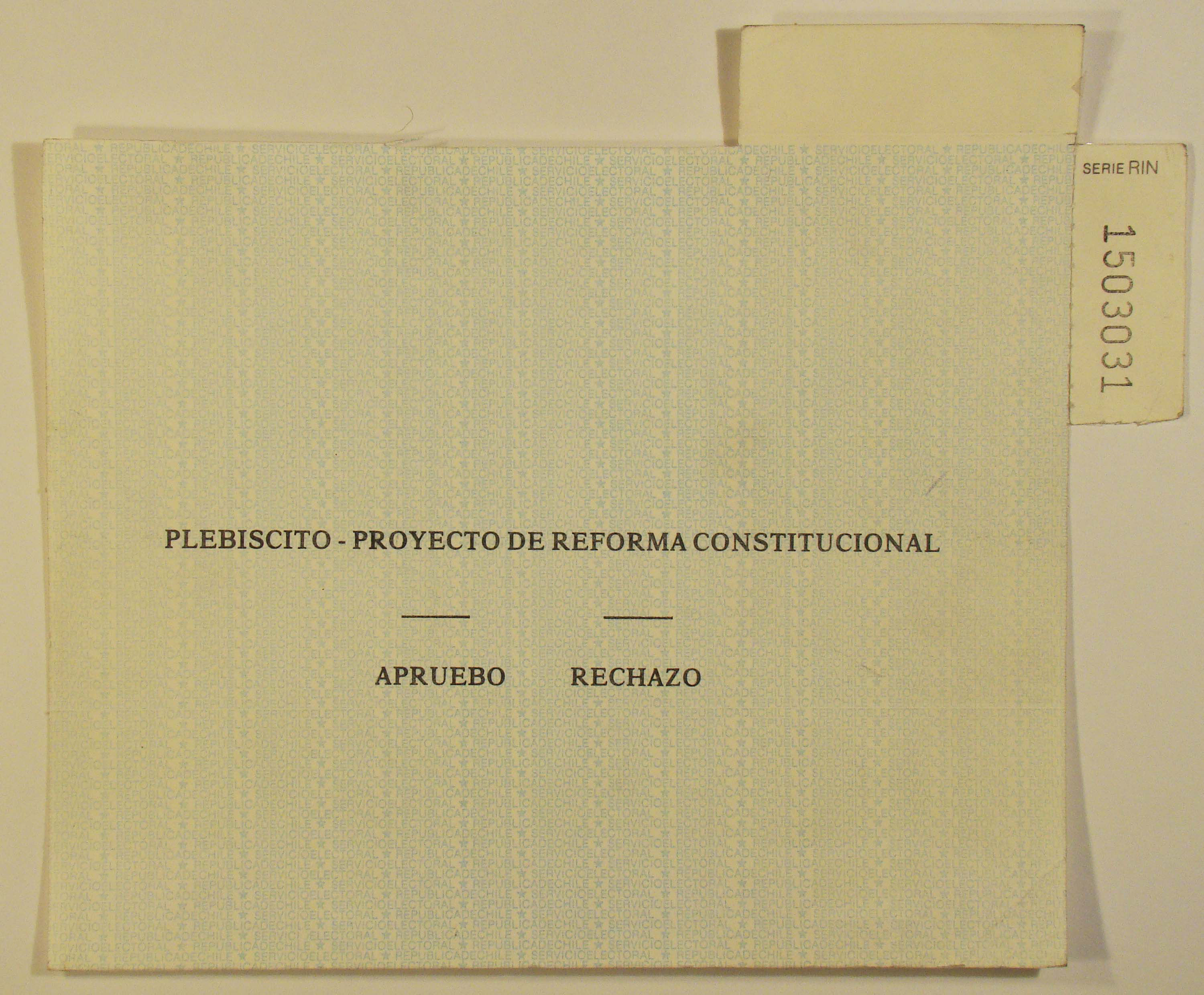
- Original ballot

Results
Choice	Votes	%
Yes	6,069,440	91.26%
No	581,615	8.74%
Valid votes	6,651,055	93.91%
Invalid or blank votes	431,024	6.09%
Total votes	7,082,079	100.00%
Registered voters/turnout	7,556,613	93.72%

A constitutional referendum was held in Chile on 30 July 1989 to approve a series of amendments to the 1980 Constitution. The proposed changes were overwhelmingly supported, with 91% of voters in favor.

== Background ==
Following the defeat of General Augusto Pinochet in the 1988 plebiscite, in which 56% of Chilean voters voted against extending his rule, Pinochet and opposition forces agreed to revise the 1980 Constitution.

The referendum sought to implement 54 constitutional reforms. Key amendments included changes to the procedures for amending the Constitution, limitations on emergency powers, recognition of political pluralism, and the strengthening of constitutional rights and democratic principles, including broader participation in political life.

The government and nearly all political parties supported the reforms. However, the right-wing Party of the South and the Chilean Socialist Party (not to be confused with the Socialist Party of Chile) opposed the changes, advocating for a "No" vote.

== Results ==
Choice	Votes	%
For	6,069,440	91.26
Against	581,615	8.74
Total	6,651,055	100.00
Valid votes	6,651,055	93.91
Invalid/blank votes	431,024	6.09
Total votes	7,082,079	100.00
Registered voters/turnout	7,556,613	93.72
Source: Chilean Electoral Service

=== By region ===
Region		For		Against	
Region		Votes	%	Votes	%
I	Tarapacá	147,660	92.67	11,681	7.33
II	Antofagasta	179,540	91.88	15,780	8.12
III	Atacama	90,123	89.41	10,670	10.59
IV	Coquimbo	201,925	88.49	26,269	11.51
V	Valparaíso	666,412	92.52	53,907	7.48
VI	O'Higgins	321,780	90.33	34,456	9.67
VII	Maule	382,577	89.12	46,720	10.88
VIII	Biobío	774,111	89.32	92,564	10.68
IX	Araucanía	322,120	85.21	55,889	14.79
X	Los Lagos	404,110	88.46	52,713	11.54
XI	Aysén	32,473	89.69	3733	10.31
XII	Magallanes	71,805	92.03	6222	7.97
RM	Metropolitana	2,474,804	93.54	170,913	6.46
Total		6,069,440	91.25	581,615	8.74
