= 1993 Chilean general election =

- 11 December 1993
- Presidential election
- Turnout: 91.23% (▼3.49pp)
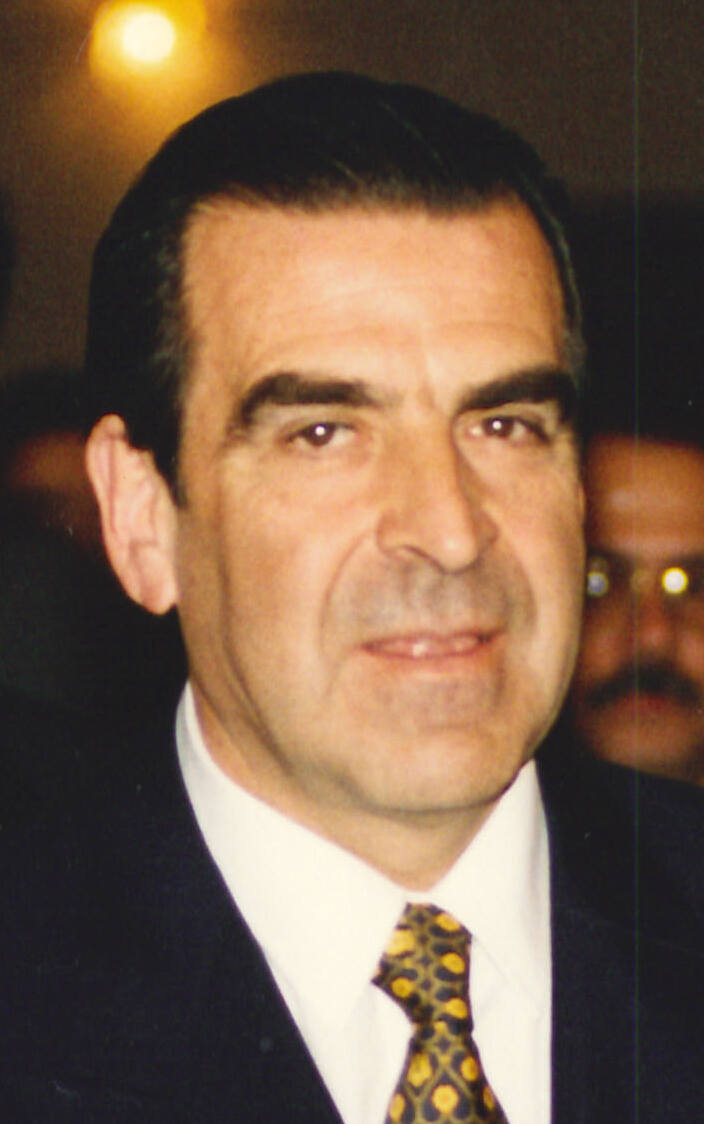

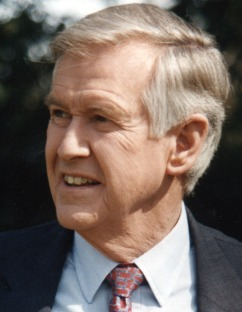

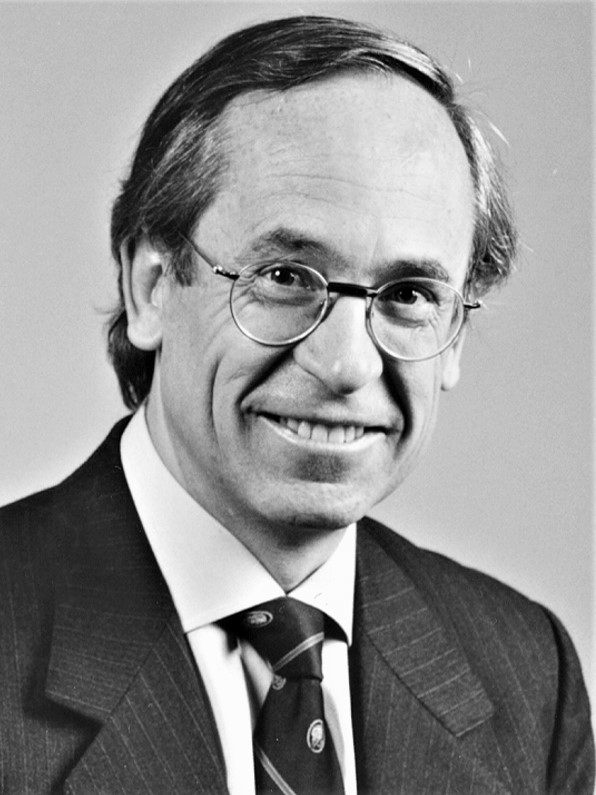

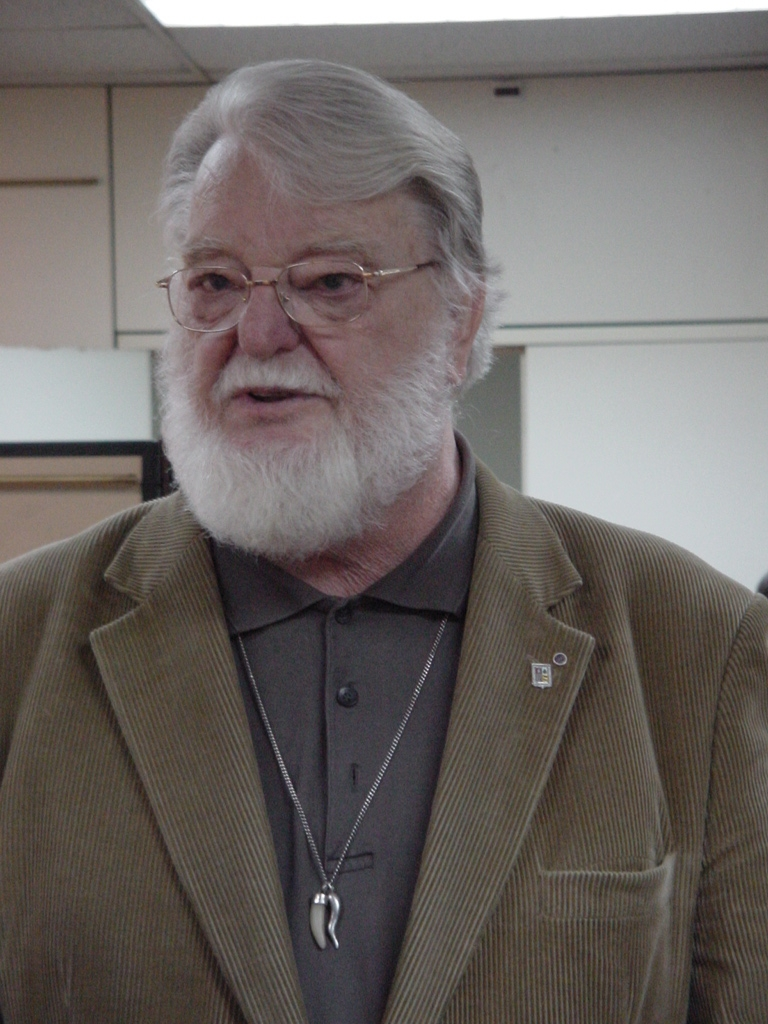
Candidate	Eduardo Frei Ruiz-Tagle	Arturo Alessandri Besa
Party	PDC	Independent
Alliance	Concertación	UPC
Popular vote	4,044,898	1,703,408
Percentage	57.98%	24.42%
Candidate	José Piñera	Manfred Max-Neef
Party	Independent	ECO
Alliance		Ecologist Movement
Popular vote	430,950	387,102
Percentage	6.18%	5.55%
- Results by commune
President before election
Patricio Aylwin
PDC
Elected President
Eduardo Frei Ruiz-Tagle
PDC
- Chamber of Deputies
- All 120 seats in the Chamber of Deputies; 61 seats needed for a majority
- Turnout: 91.34% (▼3.39pp)
Party	Vote %	Seats	+/–
Chamber of Deputies
Concertación	55.40	70	0
UPC	36.68	50	+2
This lists parties that won seats. See the complete results below.
- Senate
- 18 of 46 seats in the Senate
- Turnout: 90.29% (▼4.44pp)
Party	Vote %	Seats	+/–
Concertación	55.48	21	−1
UPC	37.32	17	+1
This lists parties that won seats. See the complete results below.

General elections were held in Chile on 11 December 1993 to elect the President, members of the Chamber of Deputies and elected members of the Senate. Eduardo Frei Ruiz-Tagle of the Concertación alliance was elected president, and the alliance also won a majority of seats in the Chamber of Deputies and maintained its majority in the Senate. As of 2026, this is the most recent presidential election that did not result in a runoff.

== Presidential candidates ==
=== Concertación de Partidos por la Democracia ===
The Concertación, which had governed with Patricio Aylwin since 1990, needed to choose a successor who would run as their presidential candidate in the 1993 elections. To determine their candidate, the parties decided to hold primary elections, marking a historic milestone as it was the first time in Chile that a political coalition used this mechanism to select its sole candidate. Participation in these primaries required prior registration of voters, and there was no law or support from the Election Certification Tribunal (Tricel) or the Electoral Service (Servel) to regulate them.

The Christian Democratic Party (PDC) chose Eduardo Frei Ruiz-Tagle, the son of former President Eduardo Frei Montalva, as their candidate. Frei Ruiz-Tagle had previously run as a pre-candidate for the Concertación in the 1989 presidential election, but was unsuccessful. He then focused on strengthening his position within the PDC and achieved this by winning a senatorial election in the Santiago Oriente constituency in 1989 and becoming the party's president in 1990.

The other pre-candidate was Ricardo Lagos Escobar, a prominent leader of the Party for Democracy (PPD), who also had the support of the Socialist Party (PS) due to his participation in the "No" campaign in the 1988 plebiscite. Lagos had run as a senatorial candidate for the Santiago Poniente constituency in 1989, but despite finishing second, he lost due to the workings of the binomial electoral system. In 1990, he became Minister of Education in the Aylwin government, a position he held until 1992 when he left to begin his presidential campaign.

An unsuccessful attempt was made to nominate Senator Anselmo Sule of the Radical Party (PR) and Cristián Reitze, president of the Humanist Green Alliance party, as candidates. Reitze later left the Concertación after realizing that there was a move to exclude him from the primary.

On May 23, 1993, the primaries were held, and Frei won by 64% of the vote, officially becoming the candidate on May 30. The PS and PPD respected the outcome and supported the chosen candidate.

=== Unión por el Progreso de Chile ===
In 1992, the largest right-wing party at the time, Renovación Nacional (RN), had two presidential pre-candidates: Senator for Santiago Oriente Sebastián Piñera and Deputy for Las Condes, Vitacura, and Lo Barnechea Evelyn Matthei. However, the aftermath of the Piñeragate political scandal that same year put an end to their aspirations, prompting RN to search for a new candidate. Manuel Feliú was ultimately selected as the replacement.

The Independent Democratic Union (UDI) initially nominated Jovino Novoa, its president, as its pre-candidate. However, there was a third candidate who gained support from various right-wing parties, particularly the UDI. This candidate was Arturo Alessandri Besa, an independent senator for Antofagasta who had family ties to two former presidents: Jorge Alessandri and Arturo Alessandri Palma.

A convention was held on August 8, 1993, at the Diego Portales Building to choose the coalition's candidate. The parties had been in conflict for several months over the mechanism for selecting the sole candidate, even considering primaries and who would run in them.

José Piñera Echenique, the former Labor Minister in the government led by Augusto Pinochet and brother of Senator Piñera, withdrew from the convention because he believed that the bloc's candidate should be elected through primaries. Additionally, Francisco Javier Errázuriz was considered as a potential candidate, supported by his party, the Union of Center-Center (UCC), the National Party (PN), and the Party of the South (SUR). However, negotiations over parliamentary seats led him to abandon his decision.

A total of 1,847 delegates from the coalition participated in the convention, including 547 from RN, 449 from UDI, 391 from the UCC, 46 from SUR, and 44 from the PN. The result of the first vote was as follows, in the order of the vote:

Candidate	Party	Votes	%	Result
Arturo Alessandri Besa	Independent	885	56.48	Nominee
Manuel Feliú	National Renewal	607	38.74	
Jovino Novoa	Independent Democratic Union	75	4.79	
Total		1,567	100.00	

As per the agreed terms, a second vote had to be held if no candidate obtained more than two-thirds of the total votes. However, after the results of the first vote were announced, Feliú withdrew his candidacy in favor of Alessandri.

Despite efforts, Alessandri's presidential campaign failed to attract voters. With the realization that winning the presidential election was highly unlikely, the right-wing parties shifted their focus towards the parliamentary elections, diverting their economic resources to prevent the Concertación from gaining the required number of parliamentarians needed to block their intended constitutional reforms.

=== Cristián Reitze Campos (AHV) ===
After the Humanist Green Alliance (AHV) withdrew from the Concertación, they launched the candidacy of Cristián Reitze, who based his campaign on the humanist principles of Silo, as well as the parliamentary work of the former AHV representative for La Reina and Peñalolén, Laura Rodríguez.

=== Movimiento de Izquierda Democrática Allendista ===
The Movimiento de Izquierda Democrática Allendista (MIDA), which was primarily led by the Communist Party, organized an assembly attended by around 2,000 people to nominate their candidate from a list of five names: Eduardo Gutiérrez, Manuel Cabieses, Communist leader Gladys Marín, Deputy Mario Palestro (who withdrew before the vote during the assembly), and priest Eugenio Pizarro. The results of the vote were as follows:

Candidate	Votes	%	Result
Gladys Marín Millie	1,117	42.63	Nominee
Eugenio Pizarro Poblete	1,002	38.24	
Manuel Cabieses	397	15.15	
Eduardo Gutiérrez	104	3.97	
Total	2,620	100.00	

Marín emerged as the initial winner, but due to the close vote, a second round of deliberation was held, resulting in the selection of Pizarro as the MIDA candidate. His candidacy was officially registered with the Servel through the collection of signatures, as required for any independent candidacy under Law 18,700.

Pizarro's campaign was known for its aggressive and tough tone, representing the left wing that identified with the policies of the Salvador Allende-led Popular Unity government.

=== Manfred Max-Neef (independent) ===
Manfred Max-Neef, an independent ecologist and economist, was also a candidate for the election with support from various social organizations, Mapuche communities, and sectors of the Christian Left, MAPU, and the Workers' Party. His campaign aimed to give voice to issues that were absent from public opinion, strengthen civil society, and create a scaled economy as an alternative to the alleged prevailing neoliberalism. He also positioned himself as completely horizontal on the political spectrum, which allowed him to attract votes from the Concertación, the right, the MIDA, and the AHV.

=== José Piñera (independent) ===
José Piñera launched his candidacy in January, but when he realized that Unión por el Progreso de Chile closed its doors to him, he continued on his own path. He began as a representative of people who did not identify with the political class, but later represented sectors identified with Pinochet and the dictatorship. As a result, he received support from collaborators of that dictatorship, such as Mónica Madariaga and Sergio Melnick, among others. He managed to take a considerable number of votes away from Alessandri's candidacy.

=== Failed candidacies ===
Juan Antonio Torres Araya, a representative of the Retirees' Party, was considered as a potential candidate but his candidacy did not succeed because the Electoral Service (Servel) rejected over half of the signatures submitted to register his candidacy. He eventually threw his support behind Alessandri.

The independent candidacy of Gonzalo Townsend Pinochet, the nephew of Augusto Pinochet, was successfully registered. Despite having run as a candidate for the Union of Center Center in the San Joaquín commune's municipal elections the previous year, Townsend aimed to represent the Acción Pinochetista Unitaria, a defender of the dictatorship's work, in the general election. However, after two weeks, Servel invalidated the candidacy as the candidacy had been sponsored by "more than 5% of people affiliated with political parties".

After his candidacy was rejected by the electoral agency, Gonzalo Townsend made a request that was ultimately denied. He accused the process of being a ploy to prevent his participation as a candidate and finally called for casting a null vote in the presidential elections.

== Results ==
=== President ===
Candidate	Party	Votes	%
Eduardo Frei Ruiz-Tagle	Concertación (PDC)	4,040,497	57.98
Arturo Alessandri Besa	Union for the Progress of Chile (Ind.)	1,701,324	24.41
José Piñera	Independent	430,950	6.18
Manfred Max Neef	Ecologist Movement (ECO)	387,102	5.55
Eugenio Pizarro	Leftist Democratic Alternative (Ind.)	327,402	4.70
Cristián Reitze	Humanist Green Alliance (AHV)	81,675	1.17
Total		6,968,950	100.00
Valid votes		6,968,950	94.47
Invalid/blank votes		407,741	5.53
Total votes		7,376,691	100.00
Registered voters/turnout		8,085,493	91.23
Source: SERVEL

=== Senate ===
Party or alliance		Votes	%	Seats			
Party or alliance		Votes	%	Won	Not up	Total	+/–
Concertación	Christian Democratic Party	378,987	20.22	4	9	13	0
Concertación	Socialist Party of Chile	238,405	12.72	3	2	5	+5
Concertación	Party for Democracy	275,727	14.71	2	0	2	–2
Concertación	Radical Party of Chile	119,459	6.37	0	1	1	–1
Concertación	Independents	27,253	1.45	0	0	0	–3
Concertación	Total	1,039,831	55.48	9	12	21	–1
Union for the Progress of Chile	National Renewal	279,580	14.92	5	6	11	+6
Union for the Progress of Chile	Independent Democratic Union	190,283	10.15	2	1	3	+1
Union for the Progress of Chile	Party of the South	52,509	2.80	0	0	0	0
Union for the Progress of Chile	Union of the Centrist Center	46,455	2.48	1	0	1	+1
Union for the Progress of Chile	Independents	130,587	6.97	1	1	2	–7
Union for the Progress of Chile	Total	699,414	37.32	9	8	17	+1
Leftist Democratic Alternative	Communist Party of Chile	65,073	3.47	0	0	0	New
Leftist Democratic Alternative	Popular Unitary Action Movement	3,030	0.16	0	0	0	New
Leftist Democratic Alternative	Independents	13,278	0.71	0	0	0	0
Leftist Democratic Alternative	Total	81,381	4.34	0	0	0	0
The New Left	Humanist Green Alliance	8,528	0.46	0	0	0	0
The New Left	Independents	3,740	0.20	0	0	0	0
The New Left	Total	12,268	0.65	0	0	0	0
Independents		41,233	2.20	0	0	0	0
Appointed senators				0	8	8	–1
Total		1,874,127	100.00	18	28	46	–1
Valid votes		1,874,127	91.61				
Invalid/blank votes		171,554	8.39				
Total votes		2,045,681	100.00				
Registered voters/turnout		2,265,560	90.29				
Source: SERVEL, Nohlen

=== Chamber of Deputies ===
Party or alliance		Votes	%	Seats	+/–
Concertación	Christian Democratic Party	1,827,373	27.12	37	–1
Concertación	Socialist Party of Chile	803,719	11.93	15	New
Concertación	Party for Democracy	798,206	11.84	15	–1
Concertación	Radical Party of Chile	200,837	2.98	2	–3
Concertación	Chilean Social Democracy Party	53,377	0.79	0	New
Concertación	Independents	49,764	0.74	1	–8
Concertación	Total	3,733,276	55.40	70	0
Union for the Progress of Chile	National Renewal	1,098,852	16.31	29	0
Union for the Progress of Chile	Independent Democratic Union	816,104	12.11	15	+4
Union for the Progress of Chile	Union of the Centrist Center	216,639	3.21	2	New
Union for the Progress of Chile	Party of the South	13,422	0.20	0	0
Union for the Progress of Chile	National Party	2,688	0.04	0	0
Union for the Progress of Chile	Independents	324,084	4.81	4	–4
Union for the Progress of Chile	Total	2,471,789	36.68	50	+2
Leftist Democratic Alternative	Communist Party of Chile	336,034	4.99	0	New
Leftist Democratic Alternative	Popular Unitary Action Movement	6,644	0.10	0	New
Leftist Democratic Alternative	Independents	87,817	1.30	0	–
Leftist Democratic Alternative	Total	430,495	6.39	0	0
The New Left	Humanist Green Alliance	67,733	1.01	0	–1
The New Left	Ecologist Movement	2,215	0.03	0	New
The New Left	Independents	26,247	0.39	0	–
The New Left	Total	96,195	1.43	0	–1
Independents		7,104	0.11	0	–1
Total		6,738,859	100.00	120	0
Valid votes		6,738,859	91.25		
Invalid/blank votes		646,157	8.75		
Total votes		7,385,016	100.00		
Registered voters/turnout		8,085,493	91.34		
Source: SERVEL
