= Workers' Socialist Party (Chile) =

Workers' Socialist Party Partido Socialista de Trabajadores
- Founded: 1940
- Dissolved: 1944
- Split from: Socialist Party of Chile
- Merged into: Communist Party of Chile and Socialist Party of Chile
- Headquarters: Santiago, Chile
- Ideology: Socialism; Marxism; Anti-fascism
- Political position: Left-wing
- National affiliation: Democratic Alliance (1942–1944)

The Workers' Socialist Party (Spanish: Partido Socialista de Trabajadores, or PST) was a leftist political party in Chile that existed between 1940 and 1944.

The party was founded by a faction of expelled of the Socialist Party of Chile. They were known as nonconformists, as they did not want to continue supporting the government of Pedro Aguirre Cerda and the Popular Front. In spite of this, they were integrated to the Democratic Alliance of Chile.

Among its members were César Godoy Urrutia, Carlos Muller, Emilio Zapata Díaz, Carlos Rosales, Natalio Berman and Jorge Dowling. Also included was the secretary general of the Socialist Youth Federation, Orlando Millas.

On June 18, 1944, the party was dissolved when most of its militants joined the Communist Party of Chile. A minority decided to return to the Socialist Party.

== See also ==
- Socialist Party of Chile
- Communist Party of Chile

== Bibliography ==
- Arrate, Jorge y Eduardo Rojas. 2006. Memoria de la Izquierda Chilena. Tomo I (1850–1970). Javier Vergara Editor.
- Cruz Coke, Ricardo. 1984. Historia electoral de Chile. 1925–1973. Editorial Jurídica de Chile. Santiago.
- Jordi Fuentes y Lia Cortes. 1967. Diccionario político de Chile. Editorial Orbe. Santiago.
- Jobet, Julio César. 1971. El Partido Socialista de Chile. Ediciones Prensa Latinoamericana. Santiago.
- Millas, Orlando. 1993. En tiempos del Frente Popular. Memorias, volumen I. CESOC. Santiago.
