= Party of the South (Chile) =

Party of the South Partido del Sur
- Leader: Eduardo Díaz Herrera
- Founded: 21 April 1987
- Dissolved: 23 June 1998
- Headquarters: Temuco
- Ideology: Regionalism; Conservatism
- Political position: Right-wing
- National affiliation: Union for Chile (1992–1997)

The Party of the South (Spanish: Partido del Sur) was a Chilean regionalist political party. It existed between 1987 and 1998.

== History ==
=== Origins and foundation (1983–1990) ===
The Party of the South originated in the Southern Socialist Democratic Movement (also known as "South Wind"), founded in Valdivia on September 3, 1983, by Carlos Podlech, then president of the National Association of Wheat Growers. It was mainly composed of former militants of the National Party and was defined as a regionalist and environmental movement.

The political party was founded by Eduardo Díaz Herrera in 1987, presenting the charter before the Chilean Electoral Service on April 21 of that year. The state agency filed objections to such deed six days after being given the final document on May 11. It was officially declared as "forming party" on May 23, 1987, which had a period of 210 days to register the minimum number of members. This goal was not achieved, and registration was expired on December 23, 1987. Five days later, the party started again the procedures for legal registration, achieving this objective on June 1, 1988.

In 1988 it supported the "Yes" in the 1988 plebiscite. The following year it called to vote "No" in the referendum for constitutional reforms.

=== Merger with the Liberal Party (1990–1994) ===
The party supported the candidacy of Francisco Javier Errázuriz Talavera for the presidency of the Republic of Chile in 1989. Meanwhile, the Party of the South competed in the parliamentary election with an own list, but did not select a congressman or senator. Owing to this and the party's failure to get 5% of the vote in the regions where it was registered, the Party of the South was to be dissolved by the Electoral Service on 17 July 1990. However, this was prevented by its merger with the Liberal Party, the party thus created adopting the name of the latter.

In 1992, this party competed in the municipal elections of that year, representing the Participation and Progress pact, but the party supported only independent candidates, because it was not legally constituted under its name (the Party of the South members at that time were part of the Liberal Party after its merger in 1990).

On March 5, 1993, the Liberal Party renamed, so again be referred to as "Party of the South". That same year, in the presidential election, supported the candidacy of Arturo Alessandri Besa, while in the parliamentary election it was part of the Union for the Progress of Chile, carrying only one candidate for senator and one single candidate for deputy. However, the party had no representation in Congress, but later broke relations as well as with National Renewal and the Independent Democratic Union. Because it did not obtained the minimum percentage of votes required by law, the party was dissolved on June 8, 1994.

=== Reenrollment (1994–1998) ===
The party started again the process to be enrolled under its original name on July 11, 1994, being declared as "forming party" on October 8. By a judgment of the Electoral Service, the Party of the South was registered again as a legal political party on August 21, 1995. The party was initially enrolled in the regions of Araucanía, Los Lagos and Aysén, all of southern Chile, returning to its regionalist essence.

In 1996, it returned to compete with an own list, this time in the municipal election of that year, under the name of "Independent South", winning two mayors (Eduardo Díaz Herrera in Toltén and Walter van Haidorp Montero in Saavedra) and seven councilors. Finally, in 1997, the party was integrated into the Union for Chile, to compete in the parliamentary election of that year, with one candidate for deputy (Eduardo Díaz del Río, in 51st district), who was elected. This was the end of the Party of the South, since getting a percentage lower than the minimum to subsist as a political party in that election, according to Law No. 18.603 (relating to political parties), caused its dissolution on June 23, 1998, so that most of its members went to the Independent Democratic Union.

== Presidential candidates ==
The following is a list of the presidential candidates supported by the Party of the South. (Information gathered from the Archive of Chilean Elections).

- 1988 plebiscite: In favor of Augusto Pinochet (lost)
- 1989: Francisco Javier Errázuriz (lost)
- 1993: Arturo Alessandri Besa (lost)
