= Laura Rodríguez (Chilean politician) =

Chilean political activist (1957–1992)

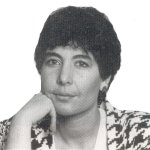
Laura Rodríguez

Laura Fiora Rodríguez Riccomini (April 1, 1957 – July 18, 1992) was a Chilean political activist from the Humanist Party. In 1989 she became the world's first Humanist to win a seat in parliament, after claiming victory as part of the Concertación coalition.

Rodríguez was born in Santiago, Chile. She married Darío Ergas in 1978. She was active in and eventually became president of the Community for Human Development. She graduated as a civil engineer from the University of Chile in 1983.

Rodríguez was co-founder of the Humanist Party in 1984 and was president of the party in 1990. She was elected to the Chilean parliament in 1989 for the La Reina-Peñalolén electoral district.

Rodríguez died of brain cancer in 1992.
