= Sergio Melnick =

Chilean politician (1951–2024)

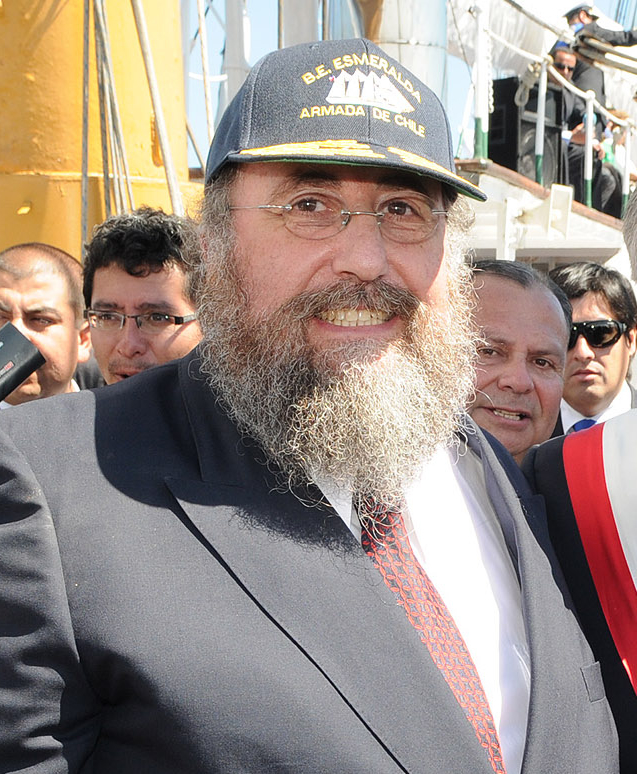
- Melnick in 2010

Councilman of Las Condes
- In office 28 June 2021 – 11 April 2024

Ministry of the National Planification Office
- In office 27 April 1987 – 17 August 1989
- Preceded by: Francisco Ramírez Migliassi
- Succeeded by: Luis Larraín Arroyo

Personal details
- Born: 27 June 1951 Santiago, Chile
- Died: 11 April 2024 (aged 72)
- Party: National Advance (1987–1990)
- Education: University of Chile (BA); University of California, Los Angeles (MA, PhD)
- Occupation: Politician
- Profession: Economist

Sergio Raúl Melnick Israel (27 July 1951 – 11 April 2024) was a politician, economist, businessman, and writer. He was the minister of planning Augusto Pinochet from 1987 to 1989, and a councilmember for Las Condes from 2020 to 2024.

== Early life ==
Melnick was born on 27 July 1951 in Santiago, Chile. He was raised in a Jewish family. He graduated from the University of Chile, and earned an M.A. and PhD. from the University of California, Los Angeles.

== Career ==
Melnick began his career as an academic. By 1986, he was a full professor at his alma mater, the University of Chile.

Melnick served as Minister of Planning under General Augusto Pinochet from 1987 to 1989, during the military dictatorship. He was succeeded by Luis Larraín Arroyo.

Melnick served as a councilmember for Las Condes from 2020 to 2024. He referred to himself as a libertarian in a 21 December 2020 Twitter post.

Melnick served as an executive director of Chilevisión and La Red, a Chilean television channel.

== Death ==
Melnick died on 11 April 2024, at the age of 72.
