= Eugenio Pizarro =

Chilean priest (born 1938)

Eugenio Pizarro Poblete (born November 7, 1938, in San Antonio, Chile) is a Chilean Catholic priest, and politician. Pizarro was also a candidate for the presidency of Chile for the Movimiento de Izquierda Democrática Allendista that included the Communist Party, in the 1993 elections, but only managed to get 327,402 (4.70%) votes from a total of 6,968,950; the elections were eventually won by Eduardo Frei Ruiz-Tagle, from the Christian Democrat Party of Chile.
