= Alliance (Chile) =

Political coalition

Alliance Alianza
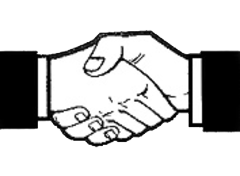
- Founded: 10 August 1989
- Dissolved: 29 January 2015
- Succeeded by: Chile Vamos
- Headquarters: Santiago de Chile
- Ideology: Liberal conservatism
- Political position: Centre-right to right-wing
- International affiliation: International Democracy Union
- Senate: 24 / 50
- Chamber of Deputies: 53 / 155
- Constitutional Convention: 37 / 154
- Mayors: 144 / 345

The Alliance (Spanish: Alianza), previously known as Alliance for Chile (Spanish: Alianza por Chile), was a coalition of centre-right to right-wing Chilean political parties. The Alliance was replaced between 2009 and 2012 by the Coalition for Change and since 2015 by Chile Vamos.

It included the National Renewal (Renovación Nacional, RN), the Independent Democratic Union (Unión Democrática Independiente, UDI) and since 2015 Political Evolution (Evolución Política, Evópoli). In the past it has included the National Party, the regional Party of the South (Partido del Sur) and the Union of the Centrist Center (Unión de Centro Centro, UCC), all of which are now defunct.

Major leaders of the Alliance have included Jovino Novoa (UDI), Pablo Longueira (UDI), Jaime Guzmán (UDI), Joaquín Lavín (UDI), Sebastián Piñera (RN), Lily Pérez (RN), Andrés Allamand (RN), Sergio Onofre Jarpa (RN), Sebastián Sichel, and Sergio Romero (RN).

== Member parties ==
The Alliance has had several names through its history:

Spanish name	English name	Year	Members
Democracia y Progreso	Democracy and Progress	1989-1992	Independent Democratic Union; National Renewal
Participación y Progreso	Participation and Progress	1992-1993	Independent Democratic Union; National Party; National Renewal
Unión por el Progreso de Chile	Union for the Progress of Chile	1993-1996	Independent Democratic Union; National Party; National Renewal; Party of the South; Union of the Centrist Center
Unión por Chile	Union for Chile	1996-2000	Independent Democratic Union; National Renewal; Party of the South
Alianza por Chile	Alliance for Chile	2000-2004	Independent Democratic Union; National Renewal
Alianza	Alliance	2004-2009	Independent Democratic Union; National Renewal
Coalición por el Cambio	Coalition for Change	2009-2012	ChileFirst; Independent Democratic Union; National Renewal
Coalición	Coalition	2012-2013	Independent Democratic Union; National Renewal
Alianza	Alliance	2013-2015	Independent Democratic Union; National Renewal
Chile Vamos	Let's go Chile	2016–2021	Independent Democratic Union; Independent Regionalist Party; National Renewal; Political Evolution
Vamos por Chile	Let's go for Chile	2021	Democratic Independent Regionalist Party; Independent Democratic Union; National Renewal; Political Evolution; Republican Party
Chile Podemos Más	Chile we can more	2021–2023	Democratic Independent Regionalist Party; Independent Democratic Union; National Renewal; Political Evolution
Chile Seguro	Safe Chile	2023	Independent Democratic Union; National Renewal; Political Evolution
Chile Grande y Unido	Great and United Chile	2025	Democrats; Independent Democratic Union; National Renewal; Political Evolution

The Union of the Centrist Center and the Republican Party only joined for one election before leaving the coalition again. Amplitude and Amarillos por Chile endorsed their presidential candidates but did not participate in the coalition. PRI's successor Common Sense was dissolved before it could run in an election.

== Electoral results ==
Senate election
Year	Designation	% votes	Seats
1989	Democracy and Progress	34.85	16 / 38
1993	Union for the Progress	37.32	9 / 18
1997	Union for Chile	36.64	9 / 20
2001	Alliance for Chile	44.03	9 / 18
2005	Alliance for Chile	37.25	8 / 20
2009	Coalition for Change	45.19	9 / 18
2013	Alliance	38.05	7 / 20
2017	Let's go Chile	37.71	12 / 23
2021	Chile we can more	27.86	12 / 27
2025	Great and United Chile	24.27	5 / 23

Chamber of Deputies election
Year	Designation	% votes	Seats	% seats
1989	Democracy and Progress	34.18	48 / 120	40.00%
1993	Union for the Progress	36.68	50 / 120	41.66%
1997	Union for Chile	36.26	47 / 120	39.16%
2001	Alliance for Chile	44.27	57 / 120	47.50%
2005	Alliance for Chile	38.72	54 / 120	45.00%
2009	Coalition for Change	43.44	58 / 120	48.33%
2013	Alliance	36.23	49 / 120	40.83%
2017	Let's go Chile	38.68	72 / 155	46.45%
2021	Chile we can more	25.43	53 / 155	34.19%
2025	Great and United Chile	21.05	34 / 155	21.94%

Constitutional Convention election
Year	Designation	% votes	Seats
2021	Let's go for Chile	20.56	37 / 138
2023	Safe Chile	21.07	11 / 50

Municipal election
Year	Designation	% votes
1992	Participation and Progress	29.67
1996	Union for Chile	32.47
2000	Union for Chile	40.09
2004	Alliance for Chile	38.72 (mayors); 37.68 (councilmen)
2008	Alliance	40.56 (mayors); 35.99 (councilmen)
2012	Coalition	37.47 (mayors); 32.94 (councilmen)
2016	Let's go for Chile	38.47 (mayors); 40.62 (councilmen)
2021	Let's go for Chile	26.01 (mayors); 30.02 (councilmen)
2024	Let's go for Chile	26.55 (mayors); 28.16 (councilmen)

Regional election
Year	Designation	% votes
2013	Alliance	32.28
2017	Let's go Chile	41.43
2021	Let's go Chile	29.36
2024	Let's go Chile	26.93

Gubernatorial election
Year	Designation	% votes
2021	Let's go Chile	19.60
2024	Let's go Chile	24.79

Presidential election
Election year	Candidate	1st Round		2nd Round		Results
Election year	Candidate	# Votes	% Votes	# Votes	% Votes	Results
1989	Hernán Büchi	2,052,116	29.4%	—N/a		Lost
1993	Arturo Alessandri Besa	1,703,408	24.2%	—N/a		Lost
1999–2000	Joaquín Lavín	3,352,192	47.5%	3,495,569	48.7%	Lost
2005–2006	Sebastián Piñera	1,763,694	25.4%	3,236,394	46.5%	Lost
2005–2006	Joaquín Lavín	1,612,608	23.2%	—N/a		Lost
2009–2010	Sebastián Piñera	3,074,164	44.1%	3,591,182	51.6%	Won
2013	Evelyn Matthei	1,648,481	25.1%	2,111,891	37.8%	Lost
2017	Sebastián Piñera	2,418,540	36.6%	3,796,918	54.5%	Won
2021	Sebastián Sichel	898,510	12.7%	—N/a		Lost
2025	Evelyn Matthei	1,613,797	12.5%	—N/a		Lost

== Electoral symbols ==
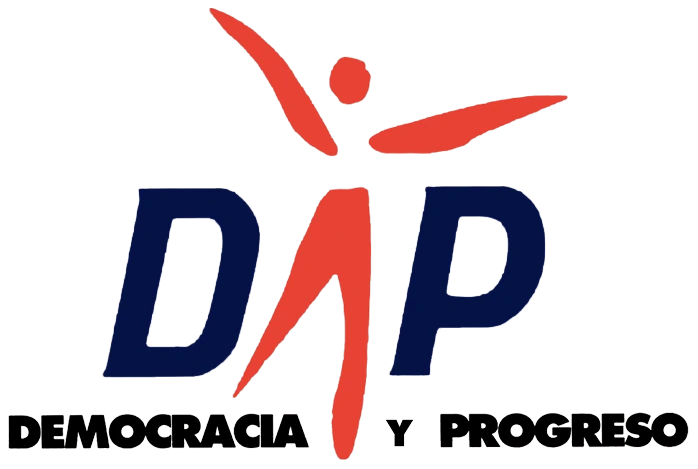
Democracy and Progress (1989)

Union for the Progress of Chile (1993)

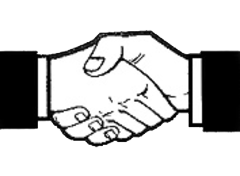
Alliance for Chile/Alliance (2001, 2005, 2013)

Coalition for Change (2009)

Let's go Chile (2017)

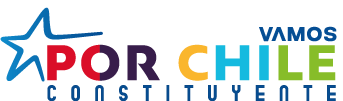
Let's go for Chile (2021)

Chile we can more (2021)

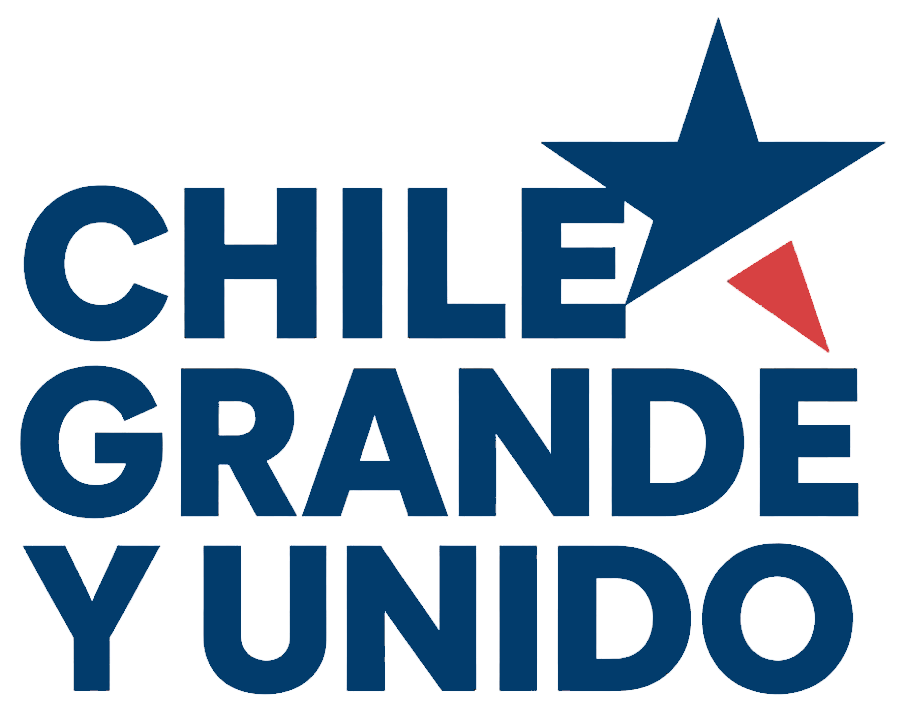
Great and United Chile (2025)

== See also ==
- List of political parties in Chile
- Centre-right coalition (Italy)
- Union of the Right and Centre
- Unite the Right (Canada)
- Coalition (Australia)
