= Union of the Centrist Center =

Union of the Centrist Centre Unión de Centro Centro
- Leader: Francisco Javier Errázuriz Talavera
- Founded: 19 July 1990 (UCC); 18 May 1994 (UCCP)
- Dissolved: 3 May 2002
- Merger of: National Democracy of Centre (1994)
- Headquarters: Santiago de Chile
- Ideology: Populism; Nationalism
- Political position: Right-wing

Party flag

The Union of the Centrist Centre (Spanish: Unión de Centro Centro, UCC) — named Progressive Union of the Centrist Center (Spanish: Unión de Centro Centro Progresista, UCCP) between 1994 and 1998 — was a small political party in Chile.

The party was founded by supermarket tycoon Francisco Javier Errázuriz to support his candidacy in the 1989 presidential elections. Errázuriz claimed that he was the only true centrist candidate, although his political ideology was slightly center-right. Errázuriz won 15.05% of the vote, but achieved little politically except to take votes from the right-wing candidate, Hernán Büchi.

The UCC then joined the right-wing alliance Union for Progress (Unión por el Progreso, later the Alliance for Chile). Due to disagreements between the UCC and the National Renewal, one of the members of the Union for Progress, the UCC broke with the alliance on 1995 and presented their own candidate, Arturo Frei, for the 1999 presidential elections. Frei fared disastrously, gaining only 0.35% of the vote, the lowest percentage of any candidate since the end of the Pinochet régime.

On 3 January 2000, Senator Errázuriz retook control of the UCC from Alejandro García and Agustín Benapres after they gave their support for Joaquín Lavín in the 2000 runoff election. Many accused Errázuriz of wanting to be in charge of the party when it had formally given its support to Lavín so that he would be rewarded with a post in the Lavín government.

Errázuriz, the only UCC member of Parliament, soon saw himself embroiled in various court cases. His term ended on 2000 and he decided to end his career in politics due to the court cases against him, the investigation into some of his companies, and the fact that three of them were bankrupt. Without their leader, On 3 May 2002 the UCC ceased to exist and part of its members joined to the Independent Democratic Union (UDI).

== Presidential candidates ==
The following is a list of the presidential candidates supported by the Union of the Centrist Center:

- 1993: Arturo Alessandri Besa (lost)
- 1999: Arturo Frei Bolívar (lost)
