= Humanist Party (Chile) =

Defunct left-wing political party in Chile

Humanist Party Partido Humanista
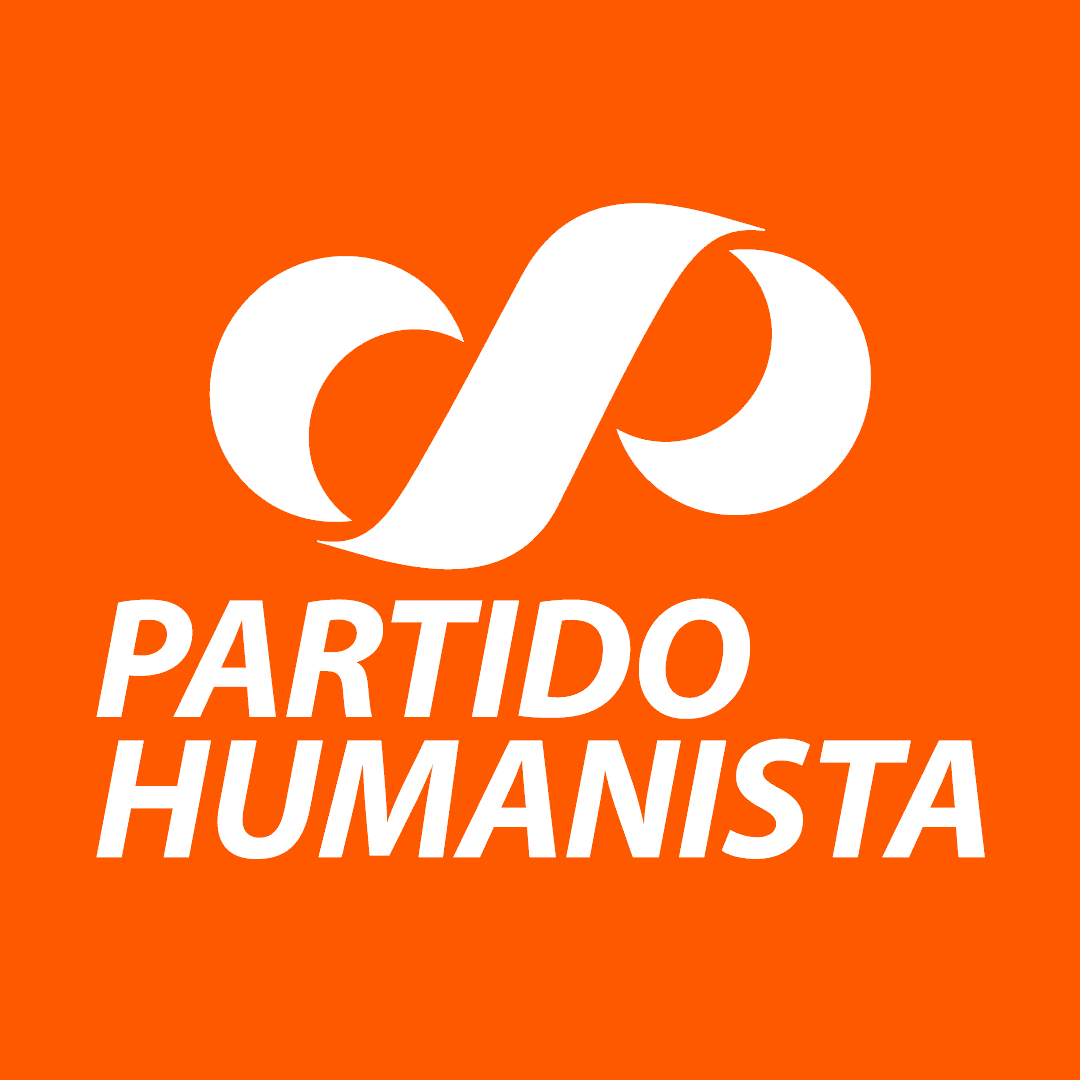
- Leader: Octavio González
- Founded: 26 May 1984
- Registered: 31 January 2023
- Dissolved: 12 February 2026
- Headquarters: 860 Condell avenue, Providencia
- Membership (2017): 19,756 (6th)
- Ideology: Universal humanism Libertarian socialism Direct democracy
- Political position: Left-wing
- National affiliation: Popular Ecologist Left (2024–2026)
- Regional affiliation: São Paulo Forum
- International affiliation: Humanist International
- Colours: Orange

Website
- Official website

The Humanist Party (Spanish: Partido Humanista) was a universal humanist, progressive, and left-wing political party in Chile, founded in 1984 and dissolved in 2026. The party was a member of the Humanist International.

In December 1990, Laura Rodríguez became the first elected representative of any Humanist Party in the world after winning a seat as part of the Concertación coalition, after Augusto Pinochet handed over power.

At the 2001 legislative elections, the party won 1.1% of the vote but no seats.

For the 2005 presidential elections, the Humanist Party was a member of the coalition Juntos Podemos Más (Together We Can Do/Achieve More). Their presidential candidate Tomás Hirsch won 5.4% of the vote in a 4-way race between Michelle Bachelet, Sebastián Piñera, and Joaquín Lavín in the 2005 elections. He polled 4th place and therefore did not make the runoff.

On 12 March 2013 they selected economist and university professor Marcel Claude as their candidate for the 2013 presidential election.

Since 2017, the Humanist Party was part of the Broad Front, a new political coalition. Their presidential candidate was Beatriz Sánchez who won 20.3% of the votes, finishing in 3rd place; additionally, three deputies from the party were elected: Tomás Hirsch, Pamela Jiles and Florcita Alarcón.

The party was dissolved in February 2022 because it did not receive at least 5% of the votes in the 2021 parliamentary elections to maintain its legality. Its members in the Chamber of Deputies thereafter sat as independents. In October 2022, the party was able to re-register in the Chilean electoral service.

== Presidential candidates ==
The following is a list of the presidential candidates and referendum options supported by the Humanist Party: (Note: Information gathered from the Archive of Chilean Elections)

- 1988 plebiscite: "No" (win)
- 1989: Patricio Aylwin (win)
- 1993: Cristián Reitze (lost; 5th place)
- 1999: Tomás Hirsch (lost; 4th place)
- 2005: Tomás Hirsch (lost; 4th place)
- 2009: Marco Enríquez-Ominami (lost; 3rd place)
- 2013: Marcel Claude (lost; 5th place)
- 2017: Beatriz Sánchez (lost; 3rd place)
- 2020 plebiscite: "Approve" (win)
- 2021: none
- 2022 plebiscite: "Approve" (lost)

== Election results ==
=== Congress elections ===
| Election year | Chamber of Deputies | | | Senate | | | Status |
| Election year | # Votes | % Votes | Seats | # Votes | % Votes | Seats | Status |
|---|---|---|---|---|---|---|---|
| 2025 | 199,680 | 1.86% | 0 / 155 | 9,753 | 0.31% | 0 / 50 | Extra-parliamentary |
