= Concertación =

Former Chilean political coalition

Concert of Parties for Democracy Concertación de Partidos por la Democracia
- Founded: 2 February 1988
- Dissolved: 30 April 2013
- Succeeded by: New Majority
- Headquarters: Londres 57, Santiago de Chile
- Political position: Majority: Centre-left

The Concertación, officially the Concertación de Partidos por la Democracia (Latin American Spanish pronunciation: [konseɾtaˈsjon de paɾˈtiðos poɾ la ðemoˈkɾasja]; English: Concert of Parties for Democracy), was a coalition of center-left political parties in Chile, founded in 1988. Presidential candidates under its banner won every election from when military rule ended in 1990 until the conservative candidate Sebastián Piñera won the Chilean presidential election in 2010. In 2013 it was replaced by New Majority coalition.

During its time in office, the Concertación presided over a notable expansion of spending on social programs together with a steady reduction in poverty in Chile.

== History ==
In 1987 General Augusto Pinochet, the dictator of Chile, legalized political parties and called a plebiscite to determine whether or not he would remain in power after 1990. Several parties, including the Christian Democracy, the Socialist Party and the Radical Party, gathered in the Democratic Alliance (Alianza Democrática). In 1988, several more parties, including the Humanist Party, the Ecologist Party, the Social Democrats, and several Socialist Party splinter groups added their support, despite fears of election fraud by Pinochet, and the Concertación de Partidos por el NO ("Coalition of Parties for NO") was formed to campaign against the continuation of Pinochet's regime.

The parties and leaders that made the first Party Presidents' Council were:

Party	Office	Leader	Notes
Christian Democratic (PDC)	President	Patricio Aylwin	Designated as Concertación spokesperson.
Christian Democratic (PDC)		Genaro Arriagada	Designated as Concertación executive secretary.
Socialist (PS)	Secretary General	Clodomiro Almeyda	Leader of «PS-Almeyda» wing.
Socialist (PS)	Secretary General	Juan Gutiérrez Soto	Leader of «PS-Histórico» wing. (Note: It didn't sign the foundation document on 2 February 1988, but it became member of Concertación on 11 May.)
Socialist (PS)	Secretary General	Manuel Mandujano	Leader of «PS-Mandujano» wing. (Note: It didn't sign the foundation document on 2 February 1988, but it became member of Concertación on 9 February.)
Socialist (PS)	Secretary General	Ricardo Núñez	Leader of the PS XXIV Congress.
Party for Democracy (PPD)	President	Ricardo Lagos	
Popular Socialist Union (USOPO)	President	Ramón Silva	
Radical (PR) (Note: merged with Social Democrat Party to form Social Democrat Radical Party)	President	Enrique Silva Cimma	
Democratic Socialist Radical (PRSD)	President	Luis Fernando Luengo	
Social Democracy (SDCH) (Note: merged with Radical Party to form Social Democrat Radical Party)	President	Amador Navarro	
National Democratic (PADENA)	President	Wolfgang Prieur	
Popular Unitary Action Movement (MAPU)	Secretary General	Víctor Barrueto	
MAPU Worker Peasant (MAPU-OC)	Secretary General	Fernando Ávila Illanes	
Christian Left (IC)	Coordinator	Luis Maira	
Humanist (PH)	President	José Tomás Sáenz	
Liberal-Republican Union (ULR)	President	Hugo Zepeda Barrios	
The Greens (PLV)	President	Andrés Koryzma	(Note: It didn't sign the foundation document on 2 February 1988, but it became member of Concertación some weeks later.)

During the election campaign, the Coalition organized a colorful and cheerful campaign under the slogan La alegría ya viene ("Joy is coming"). Some Socialist factions were the last to join, because they were reluctant to work in the plebiscite, fearing election fraud by Pinochet. On 5 October 1988, the "NO" vote won with a 54% majority, and a general election was called for 1989.

In that year, the coalition changed their name to Concertación de Partidos por la Democracia ("Concert of Parties for Democracy") and put forward Patricio Aylwin, the Christian Democrat leader, as a presidential candidate, as well as launching a common list for the parliamentary elections. In elections the following year, Aylwin won and the coalition gained the majority of votes in the Chamber of Deputies. However, in Chile's bicameral parliament, they had no majority in the Senate, a situation they found themselves in constantly for over 15 years. This forced them to negotiate all law projects with the right-wing parties, the Unión Demócrata Independiente (UDI) and Renovación Nacional (RN) (later coalesced into the Alliance for Chile).

In 1993, the coalition put forward the Christian Democrat senator Eduardo Frei Ruiz-Tagle as a presidential candidate. Frei was the son of Eduardo Frei Montalva, the founder of the Christian Democrat Party and himself a former President of Chile (1964–1970). Gaining 57% of the votes, he defeated to the right-wing candidate, Arturo Alessandri Besa, becoming the third Christian Democrat president, and the second Coalition president.

In the same year, the Humanist Party, the Christian Left, and the Greens left the Coalition, accusing it of betraying the purpose for which it was born. The Social Democrat Party and the Radical Party joined together to form the Social Democrat Radical Party, while the various former Socialist factions became part of the Socialist Party.

Frei's government faced two main problems: an economic crisis was raising the unemployment rate, and General Pinochet had been arrested in London. Both situations led the Coalition to fear defeat in the 1999 presidential elections.

=== The Socialist governments (2000–2010) ===
In that year, the coalition had two possible candidates: the Christian Democrats' Andrés Zaldívar and the Socialists' Ricardo Lagos. Primary elections were held to decide between the two. Lagos won the vote, and went on to defeat the UDI's Joaquín Lavín in the presidential election. However, since he got a plurality as opposed to a majority of the votes, a runoff vote was held, the first in Chilean history, in which Lagos won with 51% of the votes.

In 2005, two candidates were again proposed: the Christian Democrats' Soledad Alvear, a former Minister of Foreign Affairs, and the Socialists' Michelle Bachelet, a former Minister of Defense. As before, the situation was to be resolved through a primary election. However, in May 2005, after months of internal disputes regarding her party's directives, Alvear withdrew from the presidential race, deciding instead to run for senator in Santiago. Bachelet therefore became the Coalition's candidate, and the second woman to run for Chilean President (the first being Communist leader Gladys Marín), competing with the UDI's Joaquín Lavín and RN's Sebastián Piñera.

On 11 December 2005, Bachelet won with 45% of the votes, but was forced to compete with Piñera in a runoff election. In the same month, the coalition won 51.25% of the votes in the parliamentary elections, gaining 20 seats in the Senate and 65 seats in the Chamber of Deputies. This gave them a majority in both Houses for the first time.

On 15 January 2006, the runoff was held. Bachelet won with nearly the 54% of the votes, becoming the first female president of Chile. She was also the fourth Coalition candidate and third Socialist to win.

Bachelet took office as the first female president of Chile on March 11, 2006, thus beginning the fourth Concertación government. Her first year in office was marked by student protests, the Transantiago crisis—events that caused a sharp decline in public approval of the government—and the death of Augusto Pinochet in December 2006, in response to which the president refused to hold a state funeral or declare official mourning. Bachelet’s popularity began to recover midway through her term, characterized by a strong social emphasis through programs such as Chile Crece Contigo and Chile Solidario, as well as by the government’s handling of the 2008 global economic crisis; in this way, Bachelet concluded her term with a historic approval rating of 84%.

Logo of the parliamentary pact “Concertación y Juntos Podemos, for more democracy.”

For the 2008 municipal elections, the Concertación split its forces into two electoral pacts: the Democratic Concertación and the Progressive Concertación. Although, in the mayoral election, the Concertación pacts combined achieved a lower percentage than the Alianza, they won more mayoralties, while in councilor races the Concertación obtained a majority of councilors and a higher percentage of the national vote. However, when compared with previous elections, the results show an increase in the Alianza’s vote and a decrease in the Concertación’s vote.

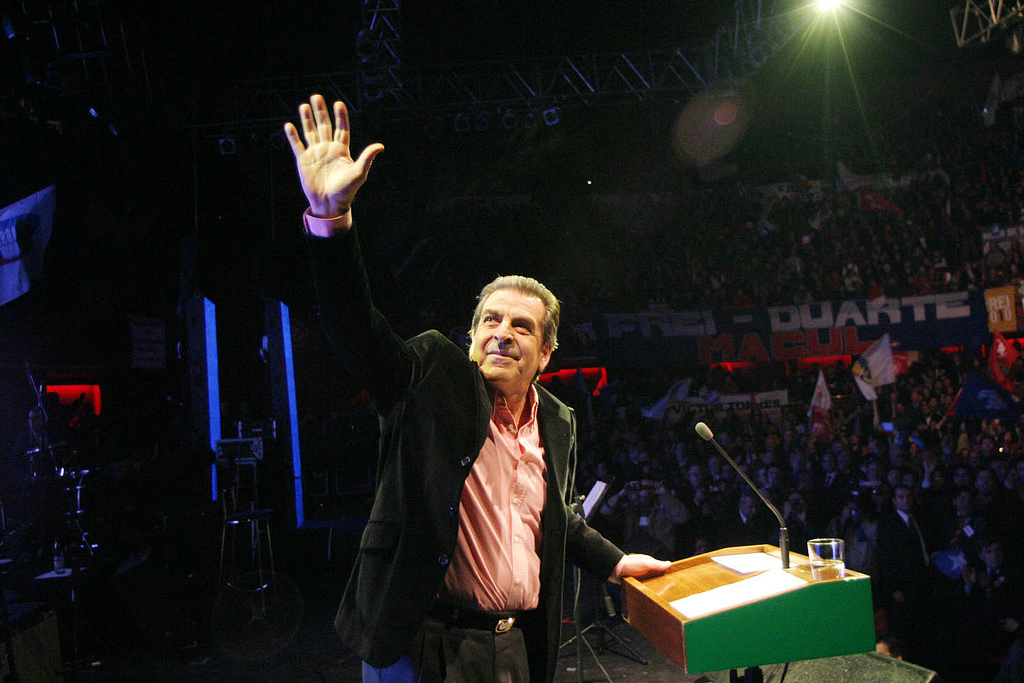
Eduardo Frei Ruiz-Tagle sought a second term in 2009 but was defeated by Sebastián Piñera, ending the possibility of a fifth consecutive government for the coalition.

For the parliamentary elections of the following year, the Concertación and the left-wing pact Juntos Podemos Más joined in an instrumental alliance called “Concertación y Juntos Podemos, for more democracy,” which made it possible to elect, for the first time since 1989, three deputies from the Communist Party. The Concertación achieved an absolute majority in the Senate but lost it in the lower chamber, as it lost all of its “double wins” in the districts that had favored it, dropping from 65 deputies to 57. For the presidential election, the Concertación chose its candidate through primary elections that adopted a different method from previous ones, giving victory to the Christian Democrat Eduardo Frei Ruiz-Tagle over the Radical José Antonio Gómez Urrutia with votes in only two regions of Chile. Frei advanced to the second round with a meager 29.6% of the vote, along with the right-wing candidate Sebastián Piñera, who ultimately won the presidential runoff held on January 17, 2010. Thus, the Concertación lost the government for the first time since 1990.

=== Opposition to Piñera’s government and the creation of the Nueva Mayoría (2010–2013) ===
In 2012, the Concertación faced its first election as an opposition force, the municipal elections of October that year. On April 1, 2012, primary elections were held for the first time to define a large part of the coalition’s slate of municipal candidates, in which around 320,000 voters participated across 142 communes of the country. After the primaries, the Concertación decided to seek convergence with the left-wing coalition Juntos Podemos, led by the Communist Party (PCCh) and the Christian Left (IC), which had already had its first rapprochement through the omission pact in the 2009 parliamentary elections; this occurred not without reluctance within the Christian Democratic Party, due to the ideological distance between the two parties.

Despite having low public approval, the Concertación, together with the PCCh and the IC, managed to defeat the ruling coalition in the municipal elections, both for mayors and councilors, increasing their number of mayors from 147 to 168 and their number of councilors from 1,070 to 1,164. Regarding the percentages in those elections, the Concertación increased its figures in mayoral races from 38.43% to 43.1%, while in the councilor lists the Concertación competed in two lists called “For a Just Chile” (PPD, PCCh, PRSD, and the Christian Left) and “Democratic Concertación” (which brought together the Christian Democratic Party and the Socialist Party of Chile). Both lists increased their percentage figures from 45.13% to 49.46%.

On April 30, 2013, the parties of the Concertación, together with other opposition parties, created the electoral pact “Nueva Mayoría” for the 2013 presidential, parliamentary, and regional council elections.It was composed of the Socialist Party of Chile (PS), the Christian Democratic Party of Chile (PDC), the Party for Democracy (PPD), the Radical Social Democratic Party (PRSD), the Communist Party of Chile (PCCh), the Citizen Left (IC), the Broad Social Movement (MAS), and center-left independents.

From within the Nueva Mayoría pact, figures such as the socialist Osvaldo Andrade, the PPD’s Jaime Quintana, and the communist Camila Vallejo argued that the coalition marked the end of the Concertación and the birth of a new, broad center-left political reference.Other politicians who did not belong to the pact, such as the PH presidential candidate Marcel Claude or RN’s Carlos Larraín, stated that it was merely a change of name for the Concertación, since in essence it would consist of the same parties plus the PCCh.

== Coalition presidents ==
- Patricio Aylwin (1990–1994)
- Eduardo Frei Ruiz-Tagle (1994–2000)
- Ricardo Lagos (2000–2006)
- Michelle Bachelet (2006–2010)

== See also ==
- List of political parties in Chile
- Chilean transition to democracy
- New Majority
