= Francisco Javier Errázuriz Talavera =

Chilean politician (1942–2024)

Fransico J. Errázuriz
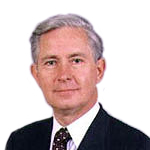

Member of the Senate
- In office 11 March 1994 – 11 March 2002
- Preceded by: Máximo Pacheco Gómez
- Succeeded by: Juan Antonio Coloma
- Constituency: 10th Circumscription

Personal details
- Born: 7 May 1942 Valdivia, Chile
- Died: 4 March 2024 (aged 81) Santiago, Chile
- Spouse: María Victoria Ovalle
- Children: 7
- Parent(s): Ladislao Errázuriz; Amelia Talavera
- Education: Pontifical Catholic University of Chile (B.Sc)
- Profession: Business administrator

Francisco Javier Errázuriz Talavera (7 May 1942 – 4 March 2024) was a Chilean businessman and politician who was a senator and presidential candidate of the Progressive Union of the Centrist Center.

He was commonly known as Fra-Fra because he was a stutterer during his childhood. Errázuriz was of Basque descent.

== Biography ==
Errázuriz was born in Santiago on 7 May 1942. He was the son of former Liberal Party senator Ladislao Errázuriz Pereira and Amelia Talavera. His grandfather was former Liberal senator Ladislao Errázuriz Lazcano.

Agricultural engineer, businessman, and politician. He was an independent candidate in the presidential election of 1989 and later served as Senator for the 10th Senatorial Constituency, Maule North, between 1994 and 2002.

He married María Victoria Ovalle, who served as a deputy during the 1998–2002 parliamentary period. He was the father of seven children. He was a member of the Los Leones Golf Club, among other associations.

He completed his primary and secondary education at the German School of Santiago and at the Liberator Bernardo O'Hggins Military School, where he attained the rank of Brigadier Major. He later entered the Faculty of Agronomy and Economics of the Pontifical Catholic University of Chile, graduating as an agricultural engineer with a specialization in agricultural economics in 1964. His graduation thesis was titled Efecto de la presencia de carneros vasectomizados en las pariciones de ovejas.

=== Professional career ===
From 1958 onward, he took charge of the agricultural administration of the Atalaya estate, located in the commune of Santo Domingo. During the same period, he also developed various private business activities. In 1964, he assumed the position of operations manager of Dos Álamos Corporation and simultaneously carried out agricultural activities on property he owned in Valdivia Province.

From 1965, he managed the La Esperanza estate in Marchigüe and the La Cabaña estate in Nilahue, while also developing a transport company of his own. In 1968, he founded the company Coordinación de Empresas, which focused on capital investment and the establishment of new industries in Chile.

In 1973, he launched a garment manufacturing company in Ecuador called Fábrica Ecuatoriana de Confecciones (FABEC), operating under license from McGregor International, and developed the Sociedad Latinoamericana de Construcciones S.A. (SOLAC) in Quito. Around 1975, he acquired several agricultural properties in Santiago Province and the O'Higgins Region.

During this period, he also promoted and initiated the installation of a new industry in Arica, producing carbonless copy paper, and expanded his business activities into commercial importation, particularly in the automotive sector. From 1976 onward, he held the Chilean representation of the Japanese automobile brands Datsun and Nissan. He also developed the commercialization of agricultural machinery imported from Brazil, Sweden, and Finland.

In 1980, he acquired Banco Comercial de Curicó, auctioned by CORFO, which was renamed Banco Nacional, where he served as chairman of the board. In 1981, together with other partners, he developed the pension fund administrator Invierta, where he held the position of vice president. He also created the life and general insurance companies Renta Nacional, Leasing Nacional, and financial factoring companies.

He further developed business ventures in the fishing and mining sectors. In fisheries, he established Pesquera Nacional and two fishmeal processing plants in Chile, along with a third plant in Chimbote, Peru, where he also founded Banco República. In the mining sector, he undertook gold and copper projects involving mineral processing plants, as well as iodine and nitrate production plants in northern Chile.

After consolidating these companies, in 1988 he formed the holding company Inversiones Errázuriz S.A. (INVERRAZ). In 2007, he sold the supermarket chain Unimarc, which he had acquired in 1982, to businessman Álvaro Saieh.

== Political career ==
In 1989, Errázuriz decided to create the Progressive Union of the Centrist Center and become a candidate in the presidential elections that year. He won 15% of the vote, but managed only to take votes from right-wing candidate Hernán Büchi.

In 1993, Errázuriz was elected Senator for the 10th Congressional District, North Maule, for the period 1994 to 2002. From 1998 to 2000, Errázuriz presided over the Economic Commission.

Errázuriz died from complications of a stroke on March 4, 2024, at the age of 81 in Pichilemu.
