= Arturo Alessandri Besa =

Chilean lawyer and politician (1923–2022)

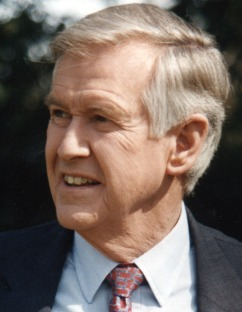

Member of the Senate
- In office 11 March 1990 – 11 March 1998
- Preceded by: Nicolás Díaz
- Succeeded by: Juan Pablo Letelier

Member of the Chamber of Deputies
- In office 15 May 1973 – 11 September 1973
- Preceded by: José Manuel Isla
- Succeeded by: 1973 coup d'état

Personal details
- Born: 31 October 1923 Santiago, Chile
- Died: 13 July 2022 (aged 98) Santiago, Chile
- Party: Independent Democratic Union (UDI)
- Other political affiliations: National Party
- Spouse: Nancy Cohn
- Children: 4
- Parent(s): Arturo Alessandri Rodríguez; Raquel Besa Montt
- Education: University of Chile (LL.B)
- Occupation: Politician
- Profession: Lawyer

Arturo Alessandri Besa (31 October 1923 – 13 July 2022) was a Chilean lawyer and politician. Alessandri was member of his country's Chamber of Deputies and also of the Senate; he also was candidate for the presidency of Chile in the 1993 elections.

He was the grandson of Arturo Alessandri Palma and the nephew of Jorge Alessandri, both presidents of Chile.

== Biography ==
=== Family and youth ===
He was born in Santiago on 31 October 1923 into a family deeply connected to Chilean political history. He was the son of Arturo Alessandri Rodríguez and Raquel Besa Montt, the grandson of former President Arturo Alessandri Palma, and the nephew of former President Jorge Alessandri Rodríguez. He married Nancy Cohn Montealegre and was the father of Patricia, Arturo, Magdalena, and Francisca. He died on 13 July 2022.

=== Professional career ===
He completed his secondary education at The Grange School and later entered the Faculty of Law of the University of Chile, where his father had served as dean and promoted the construction of the Pío Nono No. 1 building. He obtained his law degree in July 1949, presenting the graduation thesis "Nullity and Rescission in Chilean Civil Law".

After graduating, he initially remained outside politics and practiced law privately, specializing in patent law and industrial property. Following the military coup of 11 September 1973, he continued his professional activity at the law firm Alessandri & Company. In 1976, he was appointed vice-president of the Inter-American Association of Industrial Property (ASIPI), a position he held until 1979.

In his later years, he continued practicing law at Alessandri & Company, where he served as a senior advisor.

== Political career ==
He was elected Deputy in the 1973 parliamentary elections, representing the National Party.

In 1983, he was appointed Honorary Consul of Chile in Singapore.

In the December 1989 parliamentary elections, he ran as an independent candidate for the Senate of Chile within the Democracy and Progress pact, and was elected Senator for the Second Senatorial District, obtaining 41,672 votes (20.42% of valid votes).

In 1993, he ran as an independent candidate for President of the Republic, supported by the "Union for the Progress of Chile" alliance, composed of Renovación Nacional, the Union of the Centrist Center, the Independent Democratic Union, the Southern Party, and independent sectors. He obtained 1,701,324 votes (24.41% of valid votes) and was defeated by the Concertación candidate Eduardo Frei Ruiz-Tagle, who was elected President for the 1994–2000 term.

=== Memberships ===
He had been a member of the Chilean Bar Association since 1949 and served on its council between 1977 and 1978. He was also a member of the Council of the International Federation of Intellectual Property Attorneys (FICPI), the Chilean Association of Industrial Property (ACHIPI), the International Trademark Association (INTA), and the American Intellectual Property Law Association (AIPLA).

He was a founding member of the Friends of the Opera Club, an advisor to the Cultural Corporation of the Municipality of Santiago, and vice-president of the Municipal Theatre of Santiago.

In 2014, he was selected as the best intellectual property lawyer by the publication *Best Lawyers 2014*.
