= 2009–10 Chilean general election =

- Presidential election
- 13 December 2009 (first round); 17 January 2010 (second round)
- Registered: 8,285,186
- Turnout: 87.68% (first round) ▲0.01pp 86.94% (second round) ▼0.18pp
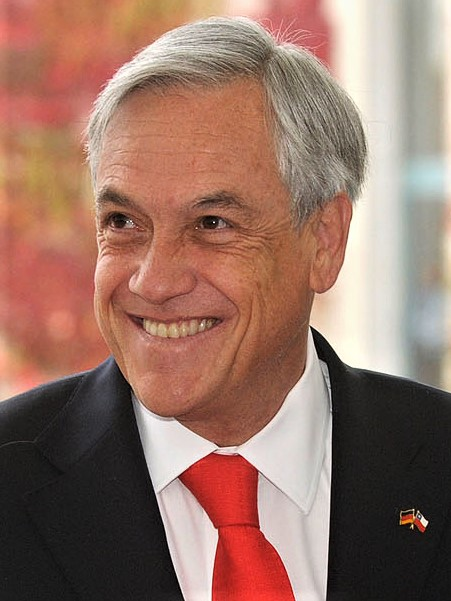

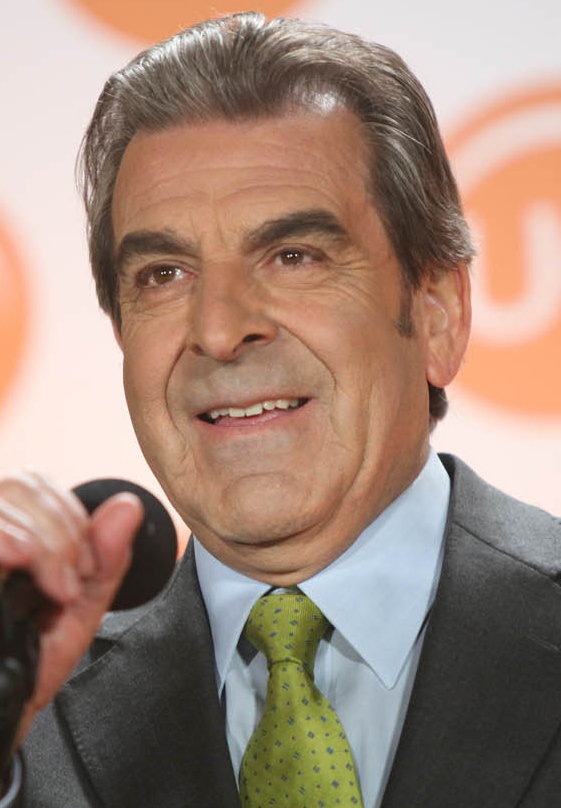
Nominee	Sebastián Piñera	Eduardo Frei Ruiz-Tagle
Party	National Renewal	PDC
Alliance	Coalition for Change	Concertación
Popular vote	3,591,182	3,367,790
Percentage	51.61%	48.39%
President before election
Michelle Bachelet
Socialist
Elected President
Sebastián Piñera
National Renewal
- Chamber of Deputies
- 13 December 2009
- All 120 seats in the Chamber of Deputies; 61 seats needed for a majority
Party	Vote %	Seats	+/–
Concertación & Juntos Podemos	44.35	57	−8
Coalition for Change	43.45	58	+4
Clean Chile, Vote Happy	5.39	3	+2
This lists parties that won seats. See the complete results below.
- Senate
- 13 December 2009
- 18 of the 38 seats in the Senate
Party	Vote %	Seats	+/–
Coalition for Change	45.19	17	0
Concertación & Juntos Podemos	43.27	19	−1
Clean Chile, Vote Happy	6.44	1	+1
This lists parties that won seats. See the complete results below.

General elections were held in Chile on Sunday 13 December 2009 to elect the president, all 120 members of the Chamber of Deputies and 18 of the 38 members of the Senate were up for election. As no presidential candidate received a majority of the vote, a second round was held between the top two candidates—Sebastián Piñera and Eduardo Frei Ruiz-Tagle—on Sunday 17 January 2010. Piñera won the runoff with 52% of the vote and succeeded Michelle Bachelet on 11 March 2010.

In the Congressional elections, the centre-right Coalition for Change improved on the Alliance for Chile's result in 2005 by winning 58 seats in the Chamber of Deputies, while the governing center-left Concertación (CPD) was reduced to 57 seats. Three communist MPs were elected (Guillermo Teillier, Hugo Gutiérrez and Lautaro Carmona), while incumbent Speaker of the Chamber, Rodrigo Álvarez (UDI) was defeated by Marcela Sabat (RN).

== Background ==
Chilean politics is dominated by two main coalitions: the center-left Concert of Parties for Democracy (Concertación de Partidos por la Democracia), composed of the Christian Democrat Party, the Socialist Party, the Party for Democracy, and the Social Democrat Radical Party; and the center-right Alliance for Chile (Alianza por Chile), composed of the Independent Democratic Union and National Renewal. The Concertación selected former president Eduardo Frei Ruiz-Tagle as their candidate, while the Alianza chose former presidential candidate Sebastián Piñera, who is supported by the newly created Coalition for Change electoral group. The far-left Juntos Podemos Más pact selected former Socialist Party member Jorge Arrate as its candidate. Another former Socialist party member, deputy Marco Enríquez-Ominami (MEO), ran as independent.

== Presidential candidates ==
Candidate	Endorsement	Political spectrum
Jorge Arrate; Communist Party of Chile	Juntos Podemos Más; New Left	Left
Marco Enríquez-Ominami; Independent	New Majority for Chile; Broad Social Movement	Center-left
Eduardo Frei Ruiz-Tagle; Christian Democrat Party	Concertación; Country Force	Center-left
Sebastián Piñera; National Renewal	Coalition for Change	Center-right

=== Coalition for Change candidate ===
Sebastián Piñera (RN)	Both Alliance for Chile parties —RN and UDI— chose Sebastián Piñera as their candidate for president, now under the banner of a larger electoral pact, the Coalition for Change, which also includes the newly formed party ChileFirst and other minor groups.

==== Party pre-candidates ====
Party	Candidate	Remarks
RN	Sebastián Piñera	Piñera participated in Hernán Büchi's 1989 presidential campaign and was later elected to the Senate. He was a potential presidential nominee in 1993, but his chances were ruined by a conflict with Evelyn Matthei that came to be known as Piñeragate. In 1999 he again attempted to be the nominee, but was defeated in the convention by Joaquín Lavín. In 2005 he shook the political scene by jumping into the first round independently of the UDI. Polls show him narrowly beating Frei in a runoff scenario. He was officially proclaimed by RN on 8 August 2009. He submitted his candidacy to the Electoral Service on 9 September 2009.
UDI	Sebastián Piñera	The UDI officially proclaimed Piñera as its candidate on 22 August 2009. Piñera had been proposed as the party's candidate by the UDI's Consejo Directivo in December 2008. Pre-candidates: Evelyn Matthei: She is the daughter of Air Force General Fernando Matthei, a member of the military junta that took power in the 1973 coup. She was a member of National Renewal, but in 1992 was embroiled in a conflict with Sebastián Piñera, ending with her leaving the party and joining the UDI. She has been mentioned as a potential UDI candidate, considering she is among the leading proponents of having the UDI bring its own candidate to the first round. She has said it would be "fun" to compete against Piñera. Longueira said on 9 October 2008 that she would be an excellent candidate. On 11 October 2008, she said she was willing to run for president. She announced her precandidacy on 14 October 2008.; Potential candidates: Joaquín Lavín: He earned a master's degree in economics from the University of Chicago. Afterwards, in 1992, Lavín was elected mayor of Las Condes, a stronghold of the right, with 31% of the vote and reelected in 1997 with 78% of the vote. Lavín was the presidential candidate for the UDI-RN coalition Alliance for Chile in the 1999 election. He eventually lost to PS/PPD candidate Ricardo Lagos in a runoff by 200,000 votes. Lavín again represented UDI in the 2005 presidential election, but ended in third place with 23.23% of the vote, due to the presence of another right-wing candidate in the race, Sebastián Piñera, who made it to the runoff election with 25.41% of the vote. Pablo Longueira urged him to run for a third time for the presidential elections, but he refused and ended up running for a senate seat in the Valparaíso Region which he lost.; Hernán Larraín: He is a senator and former president of the UDI. Longueira said on 9 October 2008 that he would be an excellent candidate.; Declined candidacies: Hernán Büchi: A possible candidacy by the 1990 presidential candidate generated buzz within the UDI in June 2007. He has however declined a candidacy.; Pablo Longueira: The senator officially launched his candidacy on 30 March 2007. He had announced his plans before the 2005 election took place. He stepped down "momentarily" due to "low party support" on 3 May 2007.; Jacqueline van Rysselberghe: The mayor of Concepción was proclaimed, on 11 October 2006, as candidate by five UDI deputies from the Biobío Region. She has refused to campaign for the nomination, however, preferring to concentrate on her 2008 campaign for reelection as mayor. She was reelected as Concepción mayor in October 2008.
CH1	Sebastián Piñera	ChileFirst decided to support Piñera on 29 March 2009 after its leader, senator Fernando Flores, declined to run for president. It officially proclaimed him on 15 August 2009. Declined candidacies: Fernando Flores: The former minister of Salvador Allende and current senator launched a failed presidential bid for the 2005 election. He resigned from the PPD in early 2007 and launched a new party, ChileFirst. On 29 March 2009 ChileFirst decided to support Piñera after Flores declined to run for president.

=== Concertación candidate ===
Eduardo Frei Ruiz-Tagle (PDC)	The Concertación selected former president Eduardo Frei Ruiz-Tagle from the Christian Democrat Party as its single candidate for president. The selection process involved a single regional primary on 5 April 2009 in the Maule and O'Higgins regions between Frei and José Antonio Gómez Urrutia from the Social Democrat Radical Party. Frei won with 65% versus 35% for Gómez. Had the percentage difference between both candidates been less than 20%, the selection process would have continued with additional primaries in other regions until 17 May. Frei was legally proclaimed as presidential candidate by the PPD on 1 August 2009 and by the PDC, PS and PRSD on 22 August 2009. He submitted his candidacy to the Electoral Service on 12 September 2009.

==== Party pre-candidates ====
Each Concertación party selected its own pre-candidate for president. Only Frei and Gómez submitted their candidacies before the 26 January 2009 deadline.

Party	Candidate	Remarks
PRSD	José Antonio Gómez Urrutia	He was proclaimed by his party on 13 November 2008. He had announced his pre-candidacy two days earlier.
PDC	Eduardo Frei Ruiz-Tagle	He was proclaimed by his party on 13 December 2008. Other candidates: Pablo Lorenzini: On 16 December 2008, he said he was supporting Frei's candidacy.; Marcelo Trivelli: He announced his candidacy on 10 June 2007 during a television interview. Despite his lack of a support base, he declared himself the candidate of "honesty and sincerity" and respect towards the Constitution. Trivelli received heavy criticism from his own party because of his decision to run, and many party members declared it was not the appropriate time for candidacies. Trivelli has embarked on a number of trips around the country in order to create enough support to sustain his candidacy.; Declined candidacy: Soledad Alvear: She was constantly mentioned as a potential contender in 2009 ever since she resigned from her candidacy in favor of Bachelet. Her supporters, the alvearistas, controlled most of the PDC institutions and she commanded widespread support in the party, despite the vocal opposition of fellow Senator Adolfo Zaldívar. On 6 December 2007, she was unofficially proclaimed a presidential candidate by Christian Democrat deputy Pablo Lorenzini. She declared herself a candidate on 23 June 2008 during a television interview. On 28 October 2008, she stepped out of the race for the presidency and resigned as PDC president after disappointing results in the municipal elections held two days earlier.
PS	Eduardo Frei Ruiz-Tagle	The PS selected Frei as its candidate on 17 January 2009. He was the only person to submit a candidacy to the PS presidential convention. Declined candidacies: José Miguel Insulza: He declared himself a candidate on 12 December 2008. He, however, declined his candidacy on 5 January 2009, and gave his support to Frei.; Ricardo Lagos: His government was highly popular and his term ended with approval ratings around 60-70%. Various supporters urged him to run again in 2009. However, his popularity has lately seen a sharp fall due to the catastrophic new transport system (Transantiago), planned under his presidency. Lagos has declared all doors are open to him, but has refused to confirm whether he will participate. In March 2008, he said it was unbecoming as a former head of state to participate in a primary and would refuse to do so. On 8 November 2008, he was proclaimed unanimously by the PPD's National Directive as its candidate, but Lagos never accepted the nomination. On 2 December 2008, the PPD officially proclaimed Lagos as its candidate for the presidency. However, two days later, Lagos ruled out running for the presidency, stating in a press conference "I am not, nor will I be, a presidential candidate".
PPD	Eduardo Frei Ruiz-Tagle	The PPD selected Frei as its candidate on 24 January 2009, with 296 votes from the party's National Council, against seven for PRSD candidate José Antonio Gómez Urrutia. Other candidates: Sergio Bitar: In a 4 May 2007 interview with La Tercera, he said he was willing to be his party's presidential nominee if there was enough support. On 7 November 2008 he said that he is "without a doubt" willing to compete eventually for the presidency, but only if Ricardo Lagos's candidacy does not prosper. He declined his candidacy on 10 November 2008, following Lagos's proclamation by his party. Now that Lagos is out of the race, he may attempt a second run.; Nicolás Eyzaguirre: He has said that he could participate if Lagos declines to, but he remained silent after Lagos declined his candidacy.; Ricardo Lagos: On 4 December 2008 he ruled out running for the presidency, stating in a press conference "I am not, nor will I be, a presidential candidate".
Independent candidates	None	Failed candidacies: Marco Enríquez-Ominami: On 15 December 2008, he announced he was available to compete with Insulza in a Socialist Party primary. He, however, did not submit his candidacy to the PS presidential convention. On 9 January 2009, he agreed to compete in the Concertación primaries as independent after gaining the support of some council people and legislators.

==== Primary results ====
The primary was carried out on 5 April 2009 in the Maule and O'Higgins regions. Frei became the single Concertación candidate by beating Gómez by a 20-point lead, cancelling the need for further regional primaries.

Final results.

Candidate	Party	Votes	%
Eduardo Frei Ruiz-Tagle	Christian Democratic Party	40,140	64.91
José Antonio Gómez Urrutia	Social Democrat Radical Party	21,703	35.09
Total		61,843	100.00
Valid votes		61,843	99.14
Invalid votes		222	0.36
Blank votes		317	0.51
Total votes		62,382	100.00

=== Juntos Podemos candidate ===
Jorge Arrate (Communist Party of Chile)	The Juntos Podemos Más coalition of far-left parties selected former Socialist Party member Jorge Arrate as its sole candidate for president on 25 April 2009. He was officially proclaimed as candidate on 26 April 2009. In July 2009, after his candidacy lost the support of the Humanist Party, he became a member of the Communist Party in order to comply with the law and run for president. He submitted his candidacy to the Electoral Service on 9 September 2009.

==== Party pre-candidates ====
Party	Candidate	Remarks
PCCh	Guillermo Teillier	Teillier launched his candidacy on 26 September 2008. He said he is willing to step down in order to put forward a single candidate for the Juntos Podemos coalition of left-parties. In November 2008 he said he would be willing to participate in a primary between him, Hirsch and Alejandro Navarro, who had quit the Socialist Party. Teillier stepped down as Juntos Podemos pre-candidate on 25 April 2009, giving his support to Jorge Arrate, saying he was the right person according to the country's political moment.
PH	Tomás Hirsch	Hirsch was among the founders of the Humanist Party and vied unsuccessfully for seats in the Chamber of Deputies as part of the Concertación. In 1993, the PH broke off from the coalition. In 1999 he was the Humanist presidential candidate, but lost in the first round. In 2005, he again participated in the presidential campaign, now with the additional support of the communists. He garnered a little over 5% of the vote. In an interview with Biobío Radio on 1 September 2007, Hirsch criticized the Concertación and the Alianza and declared that he would he "happy to be a candidate" if the members of his coalition agree. On 7 June 2008 he announced he intended to run for the presidency for the third time as the PH candidate, under the Juntos Podemos umbrella.
Independent (Socialista-allendista)	Jorge Arrate	Arrate is a member of the more leftist faction of the PS and had been mentioned as a potential candidate in an alliance of this faction and the Juntos Podemos Más pact. He formally announced his candidacy on 27 January 2008, pressured by a group of socialists opposed to the Socialist Party leadership. On 20 November 2008, Arrate was proclaimed as candidate by a group of Socialist Party Central Committee members. Arrate resigned from the PS on 14 January 2009. He was proclaimed as presidential candidate on 18 January 2009 by a group of Socialist Party members, the so-called "socialistas-allendistas".

==== Primary results ====
The election to define the sole Juntos Podemos candidate was carried out on 25 April 2009 in Santiago. Arrate beat Hirsch and became the single Juntos Podemos candidate.

Final results.

Candidate	Party	Votes	%	Result
Jorge Arrate	Ind.	1,145	77.57	Juntos Podemos candidate
Tomás Hirsch	PH	331	22.42	
Valid votes		1,476	100	
Null votes		6	0.40	
Blank votes		2	0.13	
Total votes		1,484	100	

=== Independent candidate ===
Marco Enríquez-Ominami (Ind.)	On 15 December 2008, he announced he was available to compete with Insulza in a Socialist Party primary. He, however, did not submit his candidacy to the PS presidential convention. On 9 January 2009, he agreed to compete in the Concertación primaries as independent after gaining the support of some council people and legislators. He did not submit his candidacy, however. Instead he is running as an independent and as of August 2009, polling above 20% and thus threatening to displace one of the coalition-backed candidates in the expected run-off election. He was proclaimed candidate by the Humanist and Ecologist parties plus several other leftist groups under the banner of a new electoral pact, a New Majority for Chile, on 13 September 2009. He submitted his candidacy to the Electoral Service on 10 September 2009.

=== Unsuccessful candidacies ===
- Eduardo Artés (PC (AP)): He was proclaimed as a Juntos Podemos Más pre-candidate by the Communist Party (Proletarian Action) on 7 December 2007. However, on 26 July 2008, the PC (AP) left the Juntos Podemos Más pact, accusing them of abandoning their founding principles in light of the pact's electoral deal with the Concertación for the upcoming October municipal elections. He quit his candidacy in July 2009. He said his candidacy was just an opportunity to present new ideas to the country, as going through with the candidacy would be too economically onerous.
- Leonardo Farkas (Ind.): A mining businessman. On 5 December 2008, he announced he was giving up his presidential candidacy.
- Pamela Jiles (Ind.): Journalist and television presenter. She announced her candidacy in February 2009 through a column in The Clinic magazine. On 4 September 2009 she stepped out of the race in support of Navarro. In the same election, she unsuccessfully ran for a seat in the lower chamber of Congress.
- Luis Molina Vega (Ind.) A civil engineer from Tomé. Molina stepped out of the race in July 2009, due to low support.
- Alejandro Navarro (MAS): Navarro used to characterize himself as a leader in the "dissident" faction of the Socialist Party, which harshly criticized what they called the "neoliberal" economic model, supporting instead Hugo Chávez and Fidel Castro. Despite his involvement in a scandal due to his participation in a protest organized by the Unitary Workers Central where he attacked a policeman, with the possibility of being expelled from the Senate being considered, Navarro declared himself to be a presidential candidate in 2008. In November 2008, he quit the Socialist Party to form a new party called Broad Social Movement (MAS). He said his candidacy was necessary to "stop Piñera from winning in the first round", and still considered himself a Socialist. The MAS party proclaimed him its candidate on 11 November 2008; the party, however, was still open to stage a primary between all leftist candidates that were not part of the Concertación. Navarro has proposed to hold the primary in April 2009. On 5 May 2009 Navarro said he would step out of the race and support Arrate if polls released from then to September show the Juntos Podemos Más candidate having an advantage of seven points over him. He didn't rule out Arrate then supporting Enríquez-Ominami, if his candidacy was the strongest. Navarro was proclaimed as the official MAS candidate on 25 July 2009 with the support of other minor left groups. He submitted his candidacy to the Electoral Service on 14 September 2009. On 22 September 2009 Navarro withdrew his candidacy and gave his support to Enríquez-Ominami.
- Adolfo Zaldívar (PRI): The former president of the Christian Democratic Party and a Senator at the time of his nomination, lost the last internal PDC primary to Alvear. He is the brother of senator and former Interior Minister Andrés Zaldívar. He was expelled from the PDC in December 2007, later becoming part of the Regionalist Party of the Independents (PRI). He announced his intention to run as president representing that party, and was proclaimed so on 26 April 2009. This decision was ratified on 29 August 2009. He stepped out of the race on 14 September 2009, just hours before the deadline for submission.

== Coalitions for the Congressional elections ==
=== Concertación and Juntos Podemos Más ===
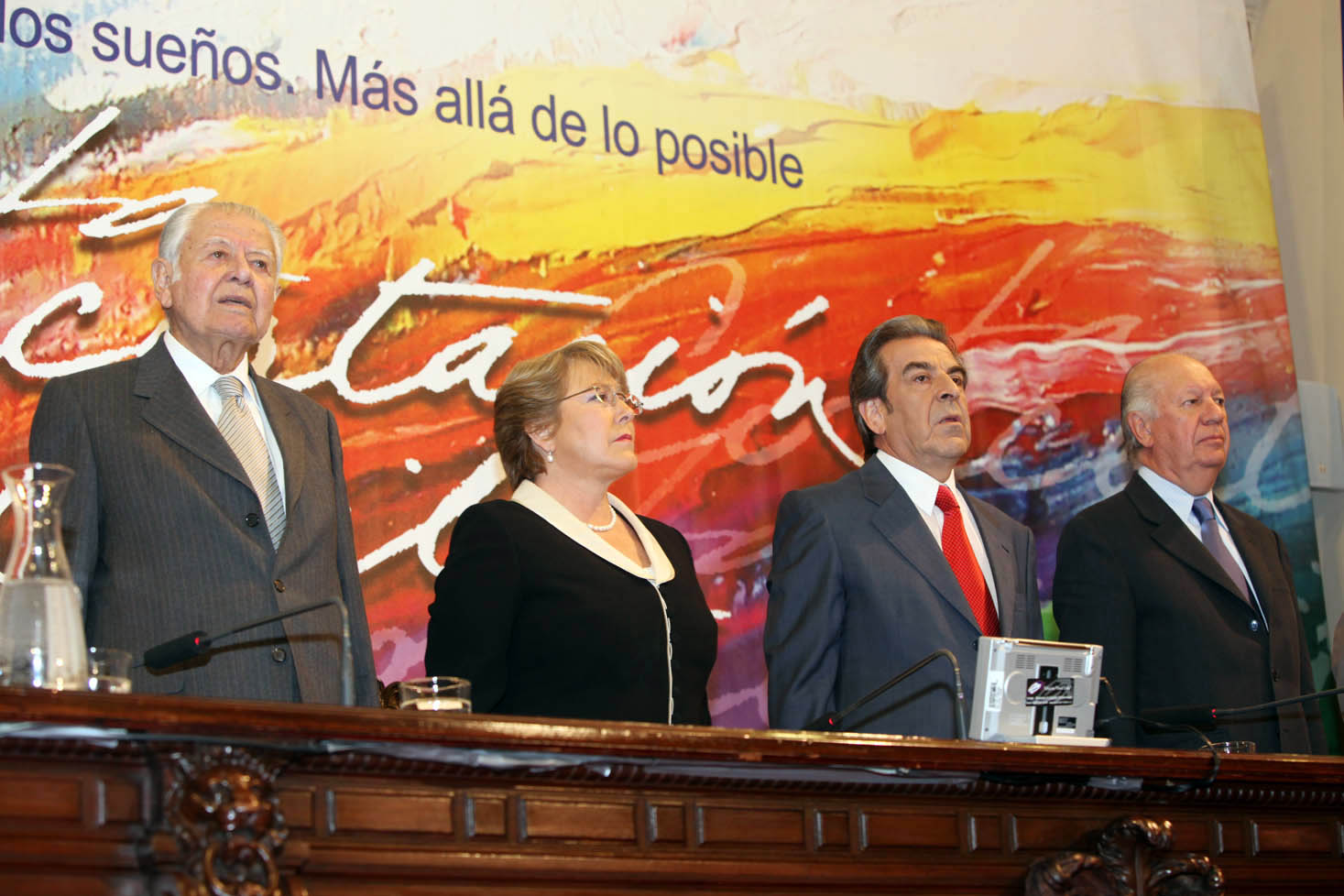
The Former presidents of Chile, together in a Concertación Conference in 2009.

The A list conformed after the union of two political coalitions that had taken part separately in the elections of 2005. On one hand the Concertación, which was grouping to the center-left parties that since 1990 governed the country. In the other hand the left-wing Juntos Podemos Más, that it suffered an internal division after the exit of the Humanist Party.

The reason of this strange union was, the Binomial System that get out the political left from the National Congress since 1994.

The largest party inside the A list was the Christian Democrats, with the leadership of Juan Carlos Latorre who was chief of the Eduardo Frei's presidential campaign. The Socialists joined with the senator Camilo Escalona, PPD with the deputy Pepe Auth. The Radicals led by Senator Gómez, and the Communist Party with the leadership of Guillermo Teillier.

=== Coalition for Change ===
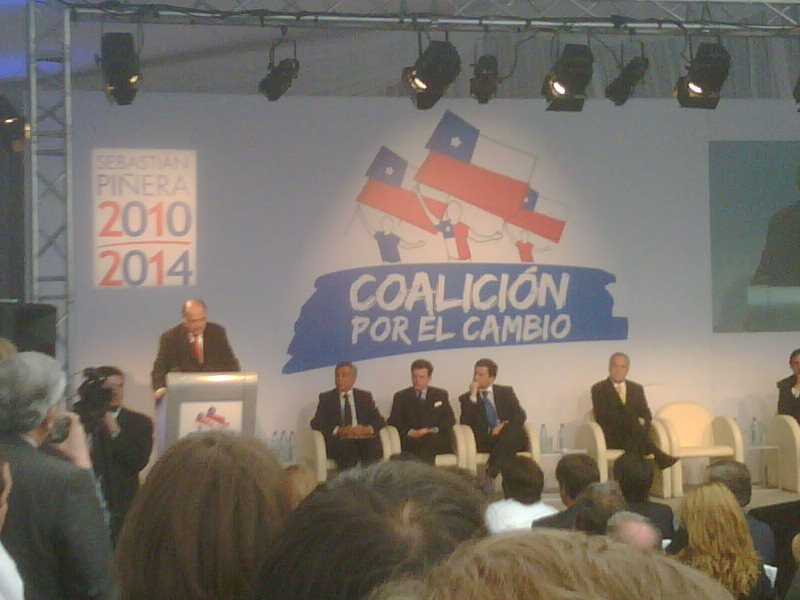
Presentation of the Coalition for the Change. Fernando Flores speaks.

The Alliance for Chile for the elections of 2009, began with an important step, by means of I arrive of two precandidates, one of them the senator Pablo Longueira, and the mayor of Concepción, Jacqueline van Rysselberghe, both of the Independent Democratic Union, who demonstrated his availability of postulating to this post, using the regular conduits inside the coalition, nevertheless, both rejected such an option to present only a presidential candidate, who would be Sebastián Piñera.

In March 2009 two Congressmen of the Alliance for Chile obtained the speaker of the Senate and the speaker of the Deputies' Chamber, by means of an agreement with the independent bench and with the Concert, respectively. The above mentioned agreements were not lacking in polemic, since the Senator who postulated the alliance to preside at the above mentioned organism, Jovino Novoa, was harshly criticized for personeros of the Concert in view of his past as member of Augusto Pinochet Ugarte's military regime.

In spite of the critiques, the Alliance for Chile awarded a political victory on having presided at both chambers of the National Congress and some of the most influential commissions of the same one, which, they waited in the conglomerate opponent, he was benefiting Sebastián Piñera's candidacy.

After having integrated the list Clean Chile, Vote Happy, one was generated fail between the charter members of ChileFirst with regard to the position that would take the party opposite to the presidential and parliamentary elections of 2009. Whereas Jorge Schaulsohn and Senator Flores supported the candidate of the Alliance for Chile Sebastián Piñera, the deputy Esteban Valenzuela rejected to join with the center-right and resigned ChileFirst to endorse Marco Enríquez-Ominami's candidacy. The support to Piñera on the part of ChileFirst was made official on 6 May 2009, when one presented the "Coalition for the Change", electoral agreement between the Alliance for Chile, ChileFirst and other political minor movements.

=== New Majority for Chile ===
New Majority for Chile was a political coalition that grouped the Ecologist party of Chile, the Humanist Party of Chile, and diverse political and independent movements that supported the candidacy of the independent Marco Enríquez-Ominami for the presidential election of 2009. Between the movements and groups without political legal constitution that they it shaped are the Regionalist Movement, the Movement Unified of Sexual Minorities (MUMS), the Movement SurDA and the Progressist Network.

== Slogans ==
Party	Slogan
Christian Democrat	With you, will live better. Live dreaming a new sun
Radical Social Democrat	A change must be Radical
Socialist	Socialist Heart
PPD	Let's break the Ice
Communist	¡United we can!
RN	With your vote today it's possible
UDI	The motor of popular change.
Regionalist	We are hope, We are future
Humanist	We are the new majority

== Opinion polls ==
=== Presidential election ===
List of opinion polls released within a year of the election. Only responses from persons registered to vote are shown.

Legend
—	Not on the list
	Wins election
	May win election
	Runoff
	May go to a runoff

==== First-round scenarios ====
Publisher	Field date	Date published	Arrate	MEO	Frei	Piñera	Other	DK/NR	Comments
CEP	19 November – 11 December 2008	30 December 2008	—	—	31	41	7	21	Source
La Segunda	18 December 2008	19 December 2008	—	—	36	46	6	12	Source
La Segunda	6 April 2009	7 April 2009	1	4	33	43	7	12	Source
La Tercera	6–7 April 2009	12 April 2009	—	3	33	42	7	15	Source
Imaginacción	4–26 April 2009	11 May 2009	—	10.5	32.4	38.3	7.6	11.2	Source
TNS Time	1–30 April 2009	5 May 2009	—	14	29	36	7	14	Source
La Tercera	21–23 April 2009	26 April 2009	—	10	28	35	7	20	Source
Ipsos	—N/a	April 2009	0.3	5.1	25.4	43.3	0	25.9	Source
La Segunda	14 May 2009	15 May 2009	1	14	27	42	4	12	Source
Imaginacción	2–30 May 2009	11 June 2009	0.5	20.9	29.9	34.9	5.6	8.2	Source
TNS Time	4–30 May 2009	2 June 2009	1	24	25	33	3	14	Source
CEP	14 May – 3 June 2009	18 June 2009	1	14	30	34	3	19	Response to a questionnaire. (Source)
CEP	14 May – 3 June 2009	18 June 2009	1	13	30	37	3	16	Ballot box vote. (Source)
Ipsos	18 May – 1 June 2009	9 June 2009	1.4	20.6	24.9	34.4	2.5	16.2	Source
Imaginacción	1–30 June 2009	14 July 2009	2.3	21.5	28.2	35.9	2.7	9.4	Source
Mori	27 June – 9 July 2009	23 July 2009	1	13	21	43	3	19	Source
La Segunda	8 July 2009	10 July 2009	2	15	27	38	3	15	Source
Imaginacción	1–31 July 2009	12 August 2009	3.5	21.9	26.7	36.7	1.7	9.5	Source
La Tercera	20–22 July 2009	26 July 2009	2	21	25	30	2	20	Source
CERC	17 July – 3 August 2009	12 August 2009	1	14	25	39	1	20	Source
Ipsos	24 July – 6 August 2009	19 August 2009	1.5	20.6	22.9	35.6	2.1	17.3	Source
Direct Media	5–6 August 2009	12 August 2009	1.63	15.48	21.28	34.43	1.32	25.86	Source
La Segunda	12 August 2009	14 August 2009	1	20	24	39	1	15	Source
Imaginacción	1–29 August 2009	14 September 2009	2.3	20.5	28.2	37.8	2.4	10.3	Source
CEP	30 July – 20 August 2009	3 September 2009	1	16	30	35	2	16	Response to a questionnaire. (Source)
CEP	30 July – 20 August 2009	3 September 2009	1	17	28	37	2	15	Ballot box vote. (Source)
Imaginacción	1–30 September 2009	14 October 2009	4.5	20.4	25.7	38.4	1.7	9.3	Source
La Segunda	24 September 2009	25 September 2009	4	19	23	39	0	15	Source
Ipsos	16 September – 6 October 2009	21 October 2009	3.7	17.8	27.2	36.7	0.3	14.3	Source
UDP	21 September – 13 October 2009	28 October 2009	4.1	17.3	23.7	30.3	0.6	24.0	Source
La Tercera	5–8 October 2009	10 October 2009	6	24	20	39	0	11	Source
CERC	2–13 October 2009	20 October 2009	3	20	20	41	0	16	Source
El Mercurio-Opina	10–12 October 2009	18 October 2009	4.9	21.5	22.8	38.0	0	12.7	Source
Giro País-Subjetiva	9–20 October 2009	31 October 2009	4.7	19.3	28.6	36.9	0	10.5	Source
Imaginacción	1–31 October 2009	16 November 2009	6.4	22.3	27.0	37.8	0	6.5	Source
CEP	8–30 October 2009	11 November 2009	4	17	26	35	0	18	Response to a questionnaire. (Source)
CEP	8–30 October 2009	11 November 2009	5	19	26	36	0	14	Ballot box vote. (Source)
El Mercurio-Opina	3–4 November 2009	7 November 2009	6.1	20.4	21.5	38.0	0	14.0	Ballot box vote. (Source)
La Segunda	18 November 2009	20 November 2009	7	20	24	38	0	11	Source
El Mercurio-Opina	5–6 December 2009	9 December 2009	6.8	19.5	22.6	38.2	0	12.9	Ballot box vote. (Source)

DK/NR: Don't know / No response.

==== Runoff scenarios ====
===== Frei vs. Piñera =====
Publisher	Field date	Date published	Frei	Piñera	DK/NR	Comments
CEP	19 November – 11 December 2008	30 December 2008	34	44	22	Source
Imaginacción	6–28 December 2008	8 January 2009	42.5	44.8	12.7	Source
La Segunda-UDD	18 December 2008	19 December 2008	38	46	16	Source
TNS Time	January 2009	31 January 2009 (unverified)	40	45	15	Source
Imaginacción	3–31 January 2009	6 February 2009	42.3	45.6	12.1	Source
TNS Time	2–26 February 2009	10 March 2009 (unverified)	38	43	19	Source
Imaginacción	7–28 February 2009	4 March 2009	43.4	46.8	9.8	Source
La Segunda-UDD	5 March 2009	6 March 2009	37	46	17	Source
TNS Time	2–30 March 2009	31 March 2009	41	39	20	Source
Imaginacción	2–31 March 2009	8 April 2009	44.3	44.7	11.0	Source
La Segunda-UDD	6 April 2009	7 April 2009	39	45	16	Source
La Tercera	6–7 April 2009	12 April 2009	40	46	14	Source
Imaginacción	4–26 April 2009	11 May 2009	43.2	43.8	13.0	Source
TNS Time	1–30 April 2009	5 May 2009	41	43	16	Source
CERC	13–27 April 2009	14 May 2009	33	47	20	Source
La Tercera	21–23 April 2009	26 April 2009	39	43	18	Source
Giro País-Subjetiva	30 April – 10 May 2009	16 May 2009	40.8	37.9	21.3	Source
La Segunda-UDD	14 May 2009	15 May 2009	34	44	22	Source
Imaginacción	2–30 May 2009	11 June 2009	43.1	44.2	12.7	Source
TNS Time	4–30 May 2009	2 June 2009	38	43	19	Source
CEP	14 May – 3 June 2009	18 June 2009	39	39	22	Response to a questionnaire. (Source)
CEP	14 May – 3 June 2009	18 June 2009	39	41	20	Ballot box vote. (Source)
Ipsos	18 May – 1 June 2009	9 June 2009	39.6	42.3	18.1	Source
Imaginacción	1–30 June 2009	14 July 2009	41.9	43.3	14.8	Source
MORI	27 June – 9 July 2009	23 July 2009	30	46	24	Source
La Segunda-UDD	8 July 2009	10 July 2009	39	43	18	Source
Imaginacción	1–31 July 2009	12 August 2009	42.8	44.5	12.7	Source
CERC	17 July – 3 August 2009	12 August 2009	36	44	20	Source
Ipsos	24 July – 6 August 2009	19 August 2009	38.1	45.5	16.4	Source
Direct Media	5–6 August 2009	12 August 2009	30.97	40.89	28.14	Source
CEP	30 July – 20 August 2009	3 September 2009	39	39	22	Response to a questionnaire. (Source)
CEP	30 July – 20 August 2009	3 September 2009	39	42	19	Ballot box vote. (Source)
La Segunda-UDD	12 August 2009	14 August 2009	36	45	19	Source
Imaginacción	1–29 August 2009	14 September 2009	42.6	44.6	12.8	Source
Imaginacción	1–30 September 2009	14 October 2009	42.2	45.2	12.6	Source
La Segunda-UDD	24 September 2009	25 September 2009	38	47	15	Source
Ipsos	16 September – 6 October 2009	21 October 2009	39.6	44.5	15.9	Source
UDP	21 September – 13 October 2009	28 October 2009	36.3	35.5	28.2	Source
La Tercera	5–8 October 2009	10 October 2009	39	48	13	Source
El Mercurio-Opina	10–12 October 2009	18 October 2009	38.1	42.5	19.4	Ballot box vote. (Source)
Giro País-Subjetiva	9–20 October 2009	31 October 2009	42.0	42.2	15.8	Source
Imaginacción	1–31 October 2009	16 November 2009	42.1	45.8	12.1	Source
CEP	8–30 October 2009	11 November 2009	36	40	24	Response to a questionnaire. (Source)
CEP	8–30 October 2009	11 November 2009	37	43	20	Ballot box vote. (Source)
El Mercurio-Opina	3–4 November 2009	7 November 2009	36.8	42.7	20.5	Ballot box vote. (Source)
La Segunda-UDD	18 November 2009	20 November 2009	37	47	16	Source
El Mercurio-Opina	5–6 December 2009	9 December 2009	34.4	42.5	23.1	Ballot box vote. (Source)
El Mercurio-Opina	15–17 December 2009	19 December 2009	39.7	46.2	14.1	Ballot box vote. (Source)
La Segunda-UDD	17 December 2009	18 December 2009	43	48	9	Source
El Mercurio-Opina	5–7 January 2010	9 January 2010	41.0	46.1	12.9	Ballot box vote. (Source)

DK/NR: Don't know / No response.

===== Enríquez-Ominami vs. Piñera =====
Publisher	Field date	Date published	MEO	Piñera	DK/NR	Comments
La Segunda-UDD	14 May 2009	15 May 2009	37	45	18	Source
MORI	27 June – 9 July 2009	23 July 2009	23	47	30	Source
La Segunda-UDD	8 July 2009	10 July 2009	36	45	19	Source
La Tercera	20–22 July 2009	26 July 2009	22	49	29	Source
CERC	17 July – 3 August 2009	12 August 2009	29	44	27	Source
Ipsos	24 July – 6 August 2009	19 August 2009	40.3	43.6	16.1	Source
Direct Media	5–6 August 2009	12 August 2009	31.29	38.88	29.83	Source
CEP	30 July – 20 August 2009	3 September 2009	33	40	27	Response to a questionnaire. (Source)
CEP	30 July – 20 August 2009	3 September 2009	34	44	22	Ballot box vote. (Source)
La Segunda-UDD	12 August 2009	14 August 2009	37	45	18	Source
Imaginacción	1–30 September 2009	14 October 2009	39.3	45.9	14.8	Source
La Segunda-UDD	24 September 2009	25 September 2009	40	47	13	Source
Ipsos	16 September – 6 October 2009	21 October 2009	42.3	42.8	14.9	Source
UDP	21 September – 13 October 2009	28 October 2009	36.4	34.0	29.6	Source
La Tercera	5–8 October 2009	10 October 2009	43	44	13	Source
El Mercurio-Opina	10–12 October 2009	18 October 2009	40.3	42.9	16.8	Ballot-box vote. (Source)
Giro País-Subjetiva	9–20 October 2009	31 October 2009	41.1	40.2	18.7	Source
Imaginacción	1–31 October 2009	16 November 2009	42.7	43.4	13.9	Source
CEP	8–30 October 2009	11 November 2009	35	37	28	Response to a questionnaire. (Source)
CEP	8–30 October 2009	11 November 2009	37	40	23	Ballot box vote. (Source)
El Mercurio-Opina	3–4 November 2009	7 November 2009	37.7	41.9	20.4	Ballot-box vote. (Source)
La Segunda-UDD	18 November 2009	20 November 2009	40	44	16	Source
El Mercurio-Opina	5–6 December 2009	9 December 2009	34.8	40.7	24.5	Ballot-box vote. (Source)

DK/NR: Don't know / No response.

===== Arrate vs. Piñera =====
Publisher	Field date	Date published	Arrate	Piñera	DK/NR	Comments
La Tercera	5–8 October 2009	10 October 2009	33	51	16	Source

DK/NR: Don't know / No response.

===== Enríquez-Ominami vs. Frei =====
Publisher	Field date	Date published	MEO	Frei	DK/NR	Comments
UDP	21 September – 13 October 2009	28 October 2009	32.3	31.9	35.8	Source

DK/NR: Don't know / No response.

== Debates ==
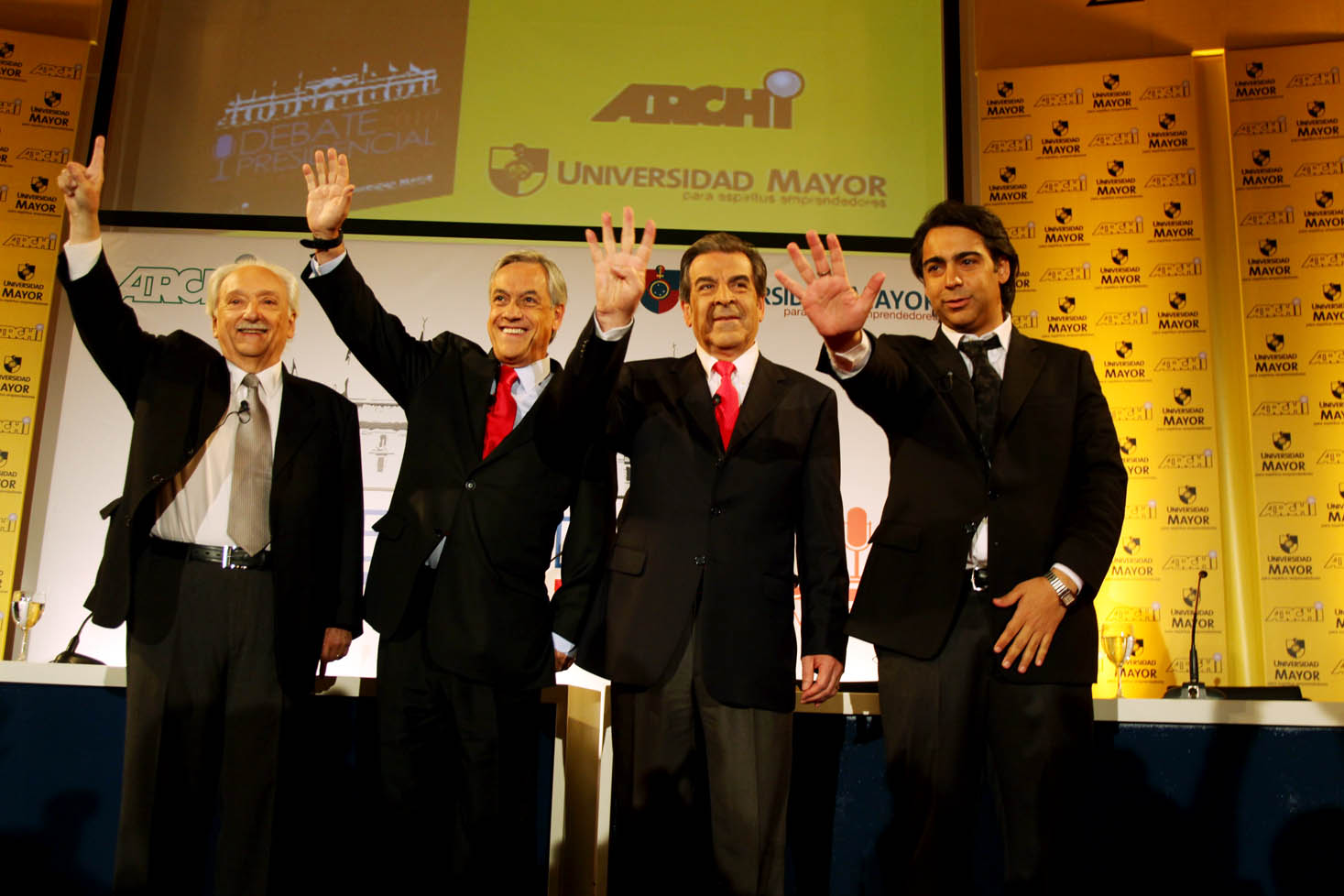
The four candidates attend the second debate organized by Archi.

The first debate was organized by TVN and took place in Studio #9 at the station's main headquarters in Santiago. It was broadcast live on 23 September 2009 at 10:40 p.m and included all four candidates. A poll published by Ipsos the following day, showed that Enríquez-Ominami, Arrate and Piñera were each considered to have had the best performance over the rest, with 29-30% of support, while Frei's showing only had the support of 9%. Frei was seen by 45% as the worst performer, followed by Piñera (37%), Arrate (10%) and Enríquez-Ominami (5%). Another poll by La Segunda found 23% thought Piñera had won the debate, followed by Arrate (21%), Enríquez-Ominami (15%) and Frei (9%). 31% thought none had won the debate.

The second debate was organized by Archi (Radio Broadcasters Association) and Mayor University. It took place at 8:30 AM on 9 October 2009. It was a radio-only debate, though some local 24-hour news channels broadcast live some parts of it. A poll carried out by Mayor University showed Piñera had won the debate by 41%, followed by Enríquez-Ominami (22%), Arrate (19%) and Frei Ruiz-Tagle (17%).

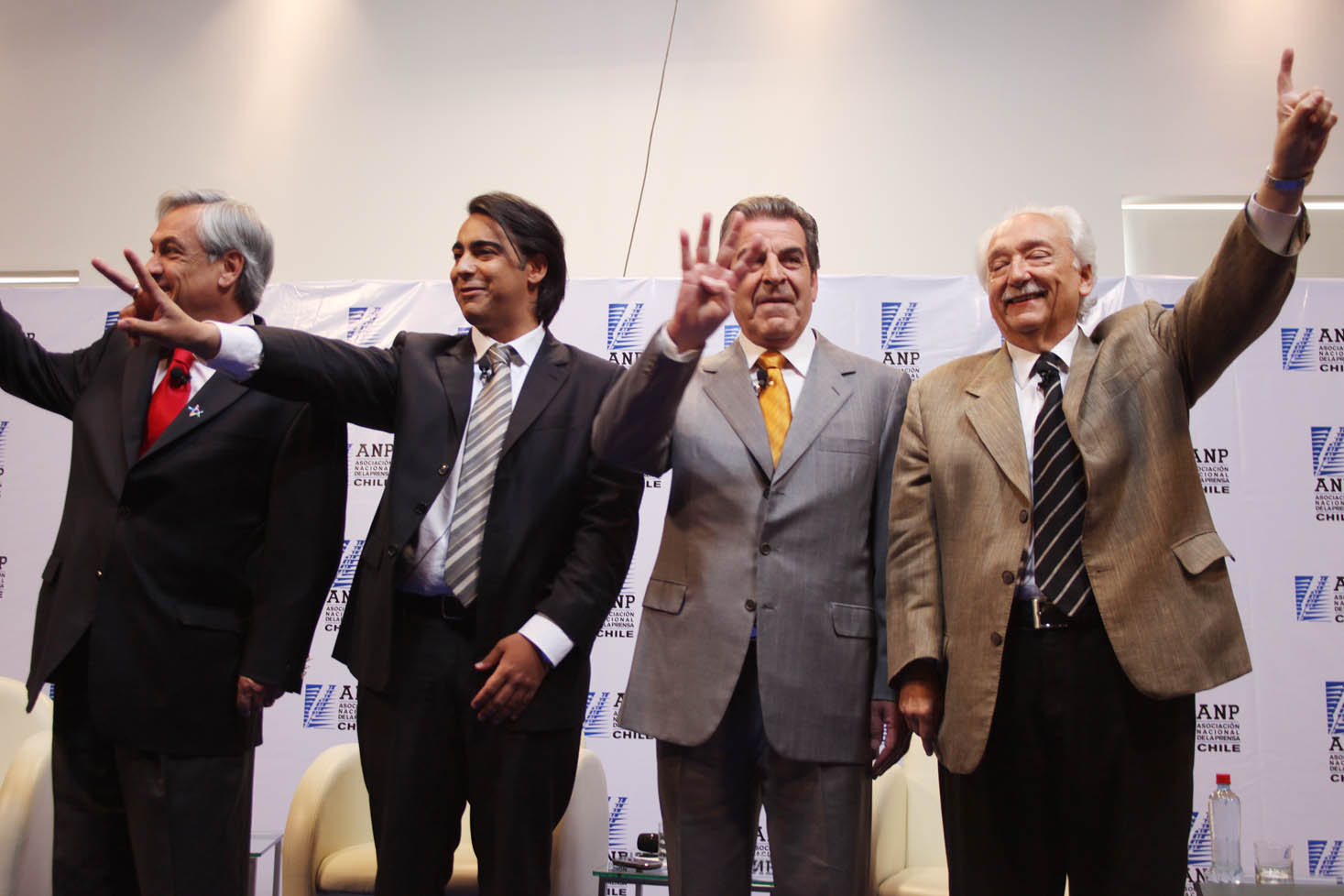
The four candidates at the ANP debate.

There was an online debate on 4 November, organized by Terra and Radio Cooperativa. Only Arrate was present after the other three candidates declined to attend. Frei and Piñera had confirmed their presence in May, while Enríquez-Ominami backed down on the same day of the debate.

A debate to discuss regional issues took place on 6 November at 9 AM in Talca's casino. It was organized by the National Press Association (ANP) and was attended by all four candidates.

A fifth debate took place on 9 November at Canal 13's studios in Santiago, which was broadcast live at 10 PM. All four candidates were present. This debate was notable because the candidates were able to ask questions to one another and freely talk to each other.

The last debate of the first round was organized by the National Television Association (Anatel) and broadcast live on 16 November at 10 PM by all terrestrial television stations. All candidates attended. There was no audience present.

For the second round, there was a single debate between the two candidates. It was organized by Anatel and broadcast at 10 PM by all terrestrial television stations on 11 January 2010.

== Results ==
=== President ===
On 20 December 2009, the Juntos Podemos Más coalition gave its support to Eduardo Frei's candidacy, after the former president agreed to include a number of policies into his government program. Two days later, Jorge Arrate also gave his full support to Frei. On 13 January 2010 Enríquez-Ominami held a press conference to state that he would vote for Frei, although he did not say his name. He had previously said that voting for Piñera would be a regression and voting for Frei would not be an advancement.

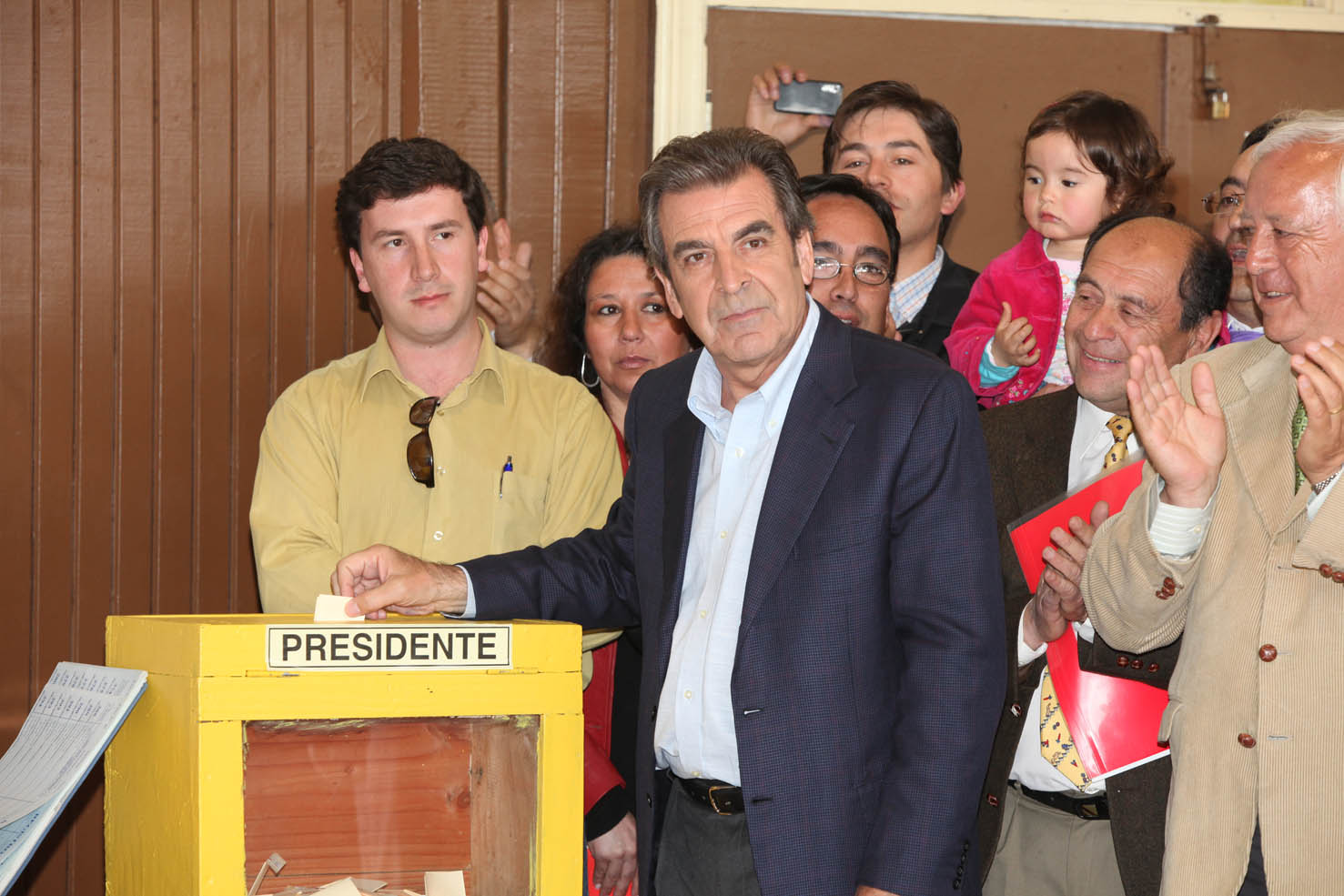
Candidate Eduardo Frei casting his ballot in La Unión on 13 December 2009

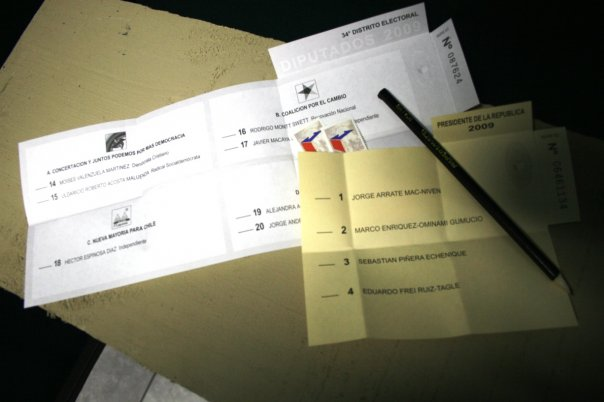
Ballots of the first round of the presidential election (in yellow) and the parliamentary election (in white).

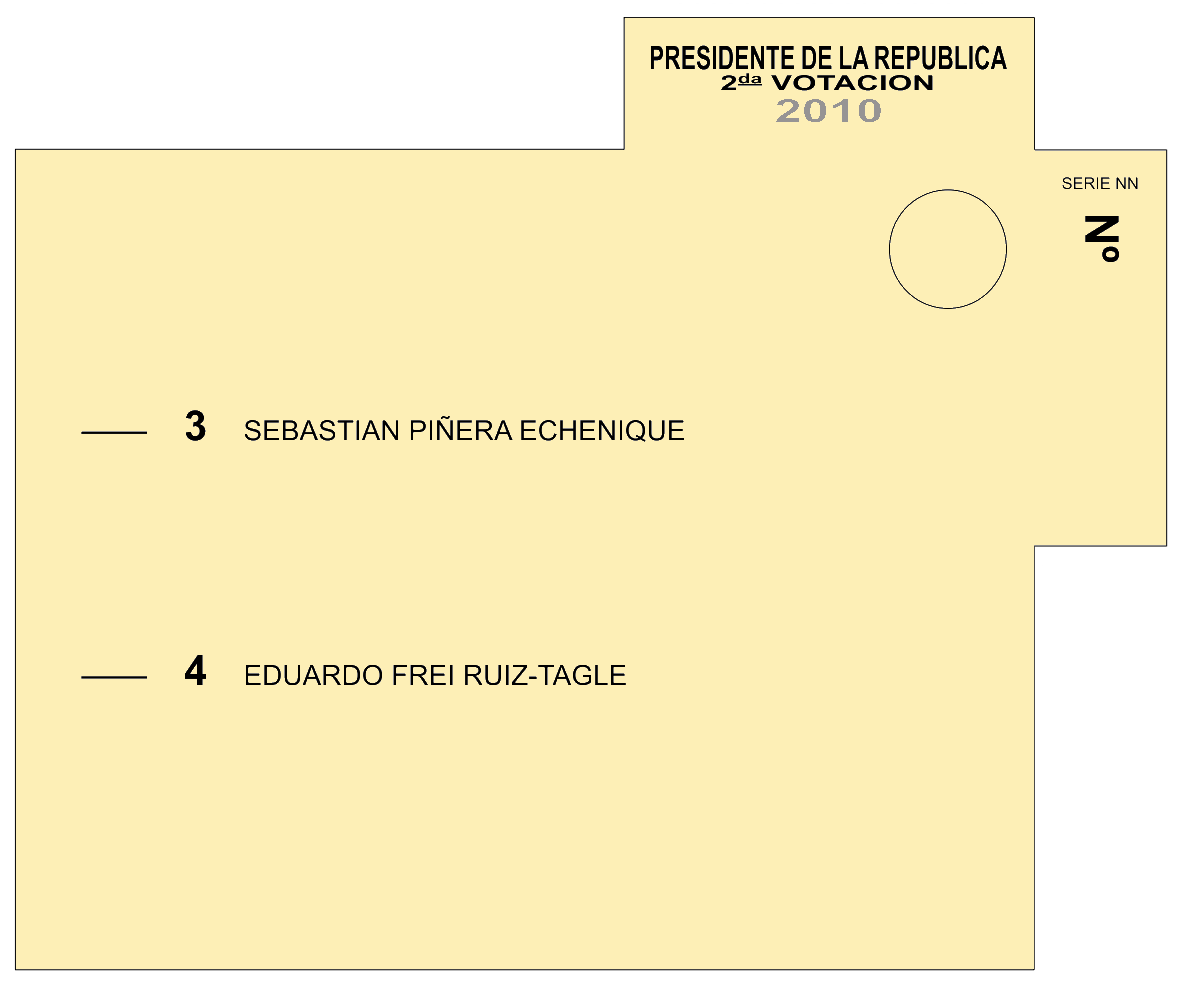
Ballot of the runoff

Candidate	Party	First round		Second round	
Candidate	Party	Votes	%	Votes	%
Sebastián Piñera	Coalition for Change (RN)	3,074,164	44.06	3,591,182	51.61
Eduardo Frei Ruiz-Tagle	Concertación (PDC)	2,065,061	29.60	3,367,790	48.39
Marco Enríquez-Ominami	New Majority for Chile (Ind.)	1,405,124	20.14		
Jorge Arrate	Juntos Podemos Más (PCCh)	433,195	6.21		
Total		6,977,544	100.00	6,958,972	100.00
Valid votes		6,977,544	96.05	6,958,972	96.61
Invalid/blank votes		286,592	3.95	244,399	3.39
Total votes		7,264,136	100.00	7,203,371	100.00
Registered voters/turnout		8,285,186	87.68	8,285,186	86.94
Source: SERVEL (first round) SERVEL (second round)

=== Chamber of Deputies ===
Party or alliance		Votes	%	Seats	+/–
Concertación & Juntos Podemos	Christian Democratic Party	940,265	14.21	19	–1
Concertación & Juntos Podemos	Party for Democracy	839,744	12.69	18	–3
Concertación & Juntos Podemos	Socialist Party	653,367	9.88	11	–4
Concertación & Juntos Podemos	Social Democratic Radical Party	251,456	3.80	5	–2
Concertación & Juntos Podemos	Communist Party of Chile	133,718	2.02	3	+3
Concertación & Juntos Podemos	Independents	115,828	1.75	1	–1
Concertación & Juntos Podemos	Total	2,934,378	44.35	57	–8
Coalition for Change	Independent Democratic Union	1,525,000	23.05	37	+4
Coalition for Change	National Renewal	1,178,392	17.81	18	–1
Coalition for Change	ChileFirst	18,021	0.27	0	New
Coalition for Change	Independents	153,261	2.32	3	+1
Coalition for Change	Total	2,874,674	43.45	58	+4
Clean Chile, Vote Happy	Regionalist Independent Party	264,466	4.00	3	+2
Clean Chile, Vote Happy	Broad Social Movement	26,440	0.40	0	New
Clean Chile, Vote Happy	Independents	65,892	1.00	0	–
Clean Chile, Vote Happy	Total	356,798	5.39	3	New
New Majority for Chile	Humanist Party	95,177	1.44	0	0
New Majority for Chile	Ecologist Party	3,815	0.06	0	New
New Majority for Chile	Independents	203,635	3.08	0	–
New Majority for Chile	Total	302,627	4.57	0	New
Independents		147,379	2.23	2	+1
Total		6,615,856	100.00	120	0
Valid votes		6,615,856	91.08		
Invalid/blank votes		647,681	8.92		
Total votes		7,263,537	100.00		
Registered voters/turnout		8,285,186	87.67		
Source: SERVEL

==== List of elected deputies 2010–2014 ====
District	Deputy	Party	Votes	%
1^{[d]}	Orlando Vargas Pizarro	Ind.-PPD	22 425	30,01 %
1^{[d]}	Nino Baltolu Rasera	UDI	17 644	23,61 %
2^{[d]}	Hugo Gutiérrez Gálvez	PCCh	28 217	30,31 %
2^{[d]}	Marta Isasi Barbieri	Ind.-UDI	28 884	31,02 %
3^{[d]}	Felipe Ward Edwards	UDI	24 618	37,36 %
3^{[d]}	Marcos Espinoza Monardes	PRSD	16 223	24,62 %
4^{[d]}	Pedro Araya Guerrero	PRI	27 268	24,60 %
4^{[d]}	Manuel Rojas Molina	UDI	37 241	33,59 %
5^{[d]}	Lautaro Carmona Soto	PCCh	17 022	27,87 %
5^{[d]}	Carlos Vilches Guzmán	UDI	13 159	21,55 %
6^{[d]}	Giovanni Calderón Bassi	UDI	8 330	19,26 %
6^{[d]}	Alberto Robles Pantoja	PRSD	11 582	26,77 %
7^{[d]}	Marcelo Díaz Díaz	PS	32 673	36,74 %
7^{[d]}	Mario Bertolino Rendic	RN	18 037	20,28 %
8^{[d]}	Matías Walker Prieto	DC	28 948	27,21 %
8^{[d]}	Pedro Velásquez Seguel	Ind.	25 919	24,37 %
9^{[d]}	Adriana Muñoz D'Albora	PPD	15 332	25,29 %
9^{[d]}	Luis Lemus Aracena	PRI	15 735	25,95 %
10^{[d]}	Eduardo Cerda García	DC	30 017	21,94 %
10^{[d]}	Andrea Molina Oliva	Ind.-UDI	36 000	26,31 %
11^{[d]}	Gaspar Rivas Sánchez	RN	21 634	20,22 %
11^{[d]}	Marco Antonio Núñez Lozano	PPD	49 801	46,55 %
12^{[d]}	Arturo Squella Ovalle	UDI	30 108	24,75 %
12^{[d]}	Marcelo Schilling Rodríguez	PS	24 124	19,83 %
13^{[d]}	Aldo Cornejo Gonález	DC	40 582	31,04 %
13^{[d]}	Joaquín Godoy Ibáñez	RN	38 183	29,20 %
14^{[d]}	Rodrigo González Torres	PPD	41 168	25,89 %
14^{[d]}	Edmundo Eluchans Urenda	UDI	45 829	28,82 %
15^{[d]}	Víctor Torres Jeldes	DC	18 102	21,11 %
15^{[d]}	María José Hoffmann Opazo	UDI	20 585	24,00 %
16^{[d]}	Gabriel Silber Romo	DC	48 333	29,39 %
16^{[d]}	Patricio Melero Abaroa	UDI	58 306	35,45 %
17^{[d]}	Karla Rubilar Barahona	RN	46 572	33,15 %
17^{[d]}	María Antonieta Saa Díaz	PPD	45 798	32,60 %
18^{[d]}	Cristina Girardi Lavín	PPD	51 669	34,35 %
18^{[d]}	Nicolás Monckeberg Díaz	RN	40 782	27,11 %
19^{[d]}	Patricio Hales Dib	PPD	39 126	38,12 %
19^{[d]}	Claudia Nogueira Fernández	UDI	38 297	37,31 %
20^{[d]}	Pepe Auth Stewart	PPD	49 981	20,70 %
20^{[d]}	Mónica Zalaquett Said	UDI	56 168	23,26 %
21^{[d]}	Jorge Burgos Varela	DC	52 982	29,79 %
21^{[d]}	Marcela Sabat	RN	48 732	27,40 %
22^{[d]}	Felipe Harboe Bascuñán	PPD	42 060	38,66 %
22^{[d]}	Alberto Cardemil Herrera	RN	38 949	35,80 %
23^{[d]}	Ernesto Silva Méndez	UDI	60 272	27,95 %
23^{[d]}	Cristián Monckeberg Bruner	RN	77 484	35,93 %
24^{[d]}	Enrique Accorsi Opazo	PPD	31 383	23,19 %
24^{[d]}	María Angélica Cristi Marfil	UDI	44 969	33,24 %
25^{[d]}	Ximena Vidal Lázaro	PPD	43 794	30,81 %
25^{[d]}	Felipe Salaberry Soto	UDI	28 444	20,01 %
26^{[d]}	Carlos Montes Cisternas	PS	71 173	50,44 %
26^{[d]}	Gustavo Hasbún Selume	UDI	36 438	25,82 %
27^{[d]}	Tucapel Jiménez Fuentes	PPD	47 765	31,89 %
27^{[d]}	Iván Moreira Barros	UDI	53 683	35,84 %
28^{[d]}	Guillermo Teillier del Valle	PCCh	49 040	33,52 %
28^{[d]}	Pedro Browne Urrejola	RN	31 882	21,79 %
29^{[d]}	Osvaldo Andrade Lara	PS	55 152	29,88 %
29^{[d]}	Leopoldo Pérez Lahsen	RN	45 464	24,63 %
30^{[d]}	Ramón Farías Ponce	PPD	29 335	19,27 %
30^{[d]}	José Antonio Kast Rist	UDI	53 423	35,10 %

District	Deputy	Party	Votes	%
31^{[d]}	Denise Pascal Allende	PS	52 763	32,23 %
31^{[d]}	Gonzalo Uriarte Herrera	UDI	60 833	37,16 %
32^{[d]}	Juan Luis Castro González	PS	27 772	30,76 %
32^{[d]}	Alejandro García-Huidobro	UDI	31 346	34,71 %
33^{[d]}	Ricardo Rincón González	DC	38 057	32,45 %
33^{[d]}	Eugenio Bauer Jouanne	UDI	26 504	22,60 %
34^{[d]}	Alejandra Sepúlveda Orbenes	PRI	42 771	45,55 %
34^{[d]}	Javier Macaya	UDI	17 130	18,24 %
35^{[d]}	Juan Carlos Latorre Carmona	DC	30 300	38,83 %
35^{[d]}	Ramón José Barros	UDI	29 622	37,96 %
36^{[d]}	Roberto León Ramírez	DC	51 476	42,93 %
36^{[d]}	Celso Morales Muñoz	UDI	35 732	29,80 %
37^{[d]}	Sergio Aguiló Melo	PS	31 649	37,69 %
37^{[d]}	Germán Verdugo Soto	RN	32 864	39,14 %
38^{[d]}	Pablo Lorenzini Basso	DC	29 320	38,32 %
38^{[d]}	Pedro Álvarez-Salamanca Ramírez	Ind.-UDI	15 844	20,71 %
39^{[d]}	Jorge Tarud Daccarett	PPD	38 626	46,26 %
39^{[d]}	Romilio Gutiérrez Pino	UDI	22 487	26,93 %
40^{[d]}	Guillermo Ceroni Fuentes	PPD	32 643	44,75 %
40^{[d]}	Ignacio Urrutia Bonilla	UDI	19 323	26,49 %
41^{[d]}	Carlos Abel Jarpa Wevar	PRSD	24 093	19,12 %
41^{[d]}	Rosauro Martínez Labbé	RN	42 385	33,64 %
42^{[d]}	Jorge Sabag Villalobos	DC	32 174	28,59 %
42^{[d]}	Frank Sauerbaum Muñoz	RN	22 861	20,33 %
43^{[d]}	Cristian Campos Jara	PPD	33 622	31,35 %
43^{[d]}	Jorge Ulloa Aguillón	UDI	30 309	28,26 %
44^{[d]}	José Miguel Ortiz Novoa	DC	45 379	27,04 %
44^{[d]}	Enrique van Rysselberghe Herrera	UDI	44 735	26,65 %
45^{[d]}	Clemira Pacheco Rivas	PS	38 379	33,80 %
45^{[d]}	Sergio Bobadilla Muñoz	UDI	29 272	25,78 %
46^{[d]}	Iván Norambuena Farías	UDI	34 852	35,77 %
46^{[d]}	Manuel Monsalve Benavides	PS	30 360	31,16 %
47^{[d]}	José Pérez Arriagada	PRSD	46 606	33,80 %
47^{[d]}	Juan Lobos Krause	UDI	51 937	37,67 %
48^{[d]}	Mario Venegas Cárdenas	DC	20 102	29,80 %
48^{[d]}	Gonzalo Arenas Hodar	UDI	17 223	25,54 %
49^{[d]}	Fuad Chahín Valenzuela	DC	20 212	30,26 %
49^{[d]}	Enrique Estay Peñaloza	UDI	16 009	23,97 %
50^{[d]}	René Saffirio Espinoza	DC	37 017	30,83 %
50^{[d]}	Germán Becker Alvear	RN	33 785	28,14 %
51^{[d]}	Joaquín Tuma Zedán	PPD	16 327	24,36 %
51^{[d]}	José Manuel Edwards Silva	RN	11 275	16,82 %
52^{[d]}	Fernando Meza Moncada	PRSD	22 116	32,72 %
52^{[d]}	René Manuel García García	RN	20 726	30,66 %
53^{[d]}	Alfonso de Urresti Longton	PS	32 433	38,71 %
53^{[d]}	Roberto Delmastro Naso	RN	25 360	30,27 %
54^{[d]}	Enrique Jaramillo	PPD	29 004	37,43 %
54^{[d]}	Gastón von Mühlenbrock Zamora	UDI	19 978	25,78 %
55^{[d]}	Sergio Ojeda Uribe	DC	23 623	30,44 %
55^{[d]}	Javier Hernández Hernández	UDI	22 108	28,49 %
56^{[d]}	Fidel Espinoza Sandoval	PS	39 245	51,30 %
56^{[d]}	Carlos Rencodo Lavanderos	UDI	18 792	24,57 %
57^{[d]}	Patricio Vallespín López	DC	33 782	38,60 %
57^{[d]}	Marisol Turres Figueroa	UDI	28 552	32,62 %
58^{[d]}	Gabriel Ascencio Mansilla	DC	17 457	23,10 %
58^{[d]}	Alejandro Santana Tirachini	RN	27 098	35,86 %
59^{[d]}	René Alinco Bustos	PPD	9381	22,90 %
59^{[d]}	David Sandoval Plaza	UDI	12 902	31,50 %
60^{[d]}	Carolina Goic Boroevic	DC	22 498	34,00 %
60^{[d]}	Miodrag Marinovic Solo De Zaldívar	Ind.	17 512	26,47 %

=== Senate ===
Party or alliance		Votes	%	Seats			
Party or alliance		Votes	%	Won	Not up	Total	+/–
Coalition for Change	National Renewal	382,728	20.19	6	2	8	0
Coalition for Change	Independent Democratic Union	403,741	21.30	3	5	8	–1
Coalition for Change	Independents	70,124	3.70	0	0	0	0
Coalition for Change	Total	856,593	45.19	9	7	16	–1
Concertación & Juntos Podemos	Christian Democratic Party	314,145	16.57	4	5	9	+3
Concertación & Juntos Podemos	Party for Democracy	262,503	13.85	3	1	4	+1
Concertación & Juntos Podemos	Socialist Party	175,017	9.23	2	3	5	–3
Concertación & Juntos Podemos	Social Democrat Radical Party	68,482	3.61	0	1	1	–2
Concertación & Juntos Podemos	Total	820,147	43.27	9	10	19	–1
Clean Chile, Vote Happy	Independent Regionalist Party	46,730	2.47	0	0	0	–1
Clean Chile, Vote Happy	MAS Region			–	1	1	0
Clean Chile, Vote Happy	Independents	75,311	3.97	0	0	0	0
Clean Chile, Vote Happy	Total	122,041	6.44	0	1	1	–1
New Majority for Chile	Humanist Party	12,974	0.68	0	0	0	0
New Majority for Chile	Independents	79,266	4.18	0	0	0	0
New Majority for Chile	Total	92,240	4.87	0	0	0	0
Independents		4,461	0.24	0	2	2	+1
Total		1,895,482	100.00	18	20	38	0
Valid votes		1,895,482	92.31				
Invalid/blank votes		157,998	7.69				
Total votes		2,053,480	100.00				
Registered voters/turnout		2,392,477	85.83				
Source: SERVEL, IPU, Election Resources

==== Tarapacá-Arica and Parinacota ====
Pact	Party	Candidate	Votes	%	Result
Coalition for Change	UDI	Jaime Orpis	56,390	33.5	Hold his seat
Clean Chile, Vote Happy	Independent	Salvador Urrutia	47,087	29.3	
Concertación	Socialist	Fulvio Rossi	45,639	26.8	New senator
Coalition for Change	National Renewal	Julio Lagos	12,348	7.3	
Concertación	PDC	Daniel Espinoza	6,919	4.1	

==== Atacama ====
Pact	Party	Candidate	Votes	%	Result
Coalition for Change	National Renewal	Baldo Prokurica	34,793	33.0	Hold his seat
Concertación	Socialist	Isabel Allende Bussi	28,240	26.8	New senator
Concertación	For Democracy	Antonio Leal	19,693	18.7	
Clean Chile, Vote Happy	Regionalist	Jaime Mulet	18,580	17.6	
Clean Chile, Vote Happy	Regionalist	Robinson Peña	2,126	2.0	
Coalition for Change	UDI	Cristián Letelier	1,909	1.8	

==== Valparaiso East ====
Pact	Party	Candidate	Votes	%	Result
Concertación	PDC	Ignacio Walker	76,716	21.1	New senator
Concertación	Social Democrat Radical	Nelson Ávila	64,124	17.6	Lost his seat
Coalition for Change	UDI	Marcelo Forni	71,645	19.7	
Coalition for Change	National Renewal	Lily Pérez	83,595	23.0	New senator
New Majority for Chile	Independent	Carlos Ominami	60,945	16.7	
New Majority for Chile	Independent	Cristián García-Huidobro	2,509	0.7	
Clean Chile, Vote Happy	Independent	Lautaro Velásquez	4,422	1.2	

==== Valparaíso West ====
Pact	Party	Candidate	Votes	%	Result
Concertación	For Democracy	Ricardo Lagos Weber	123,626	33.2	New senator
Coalition for Change	National Renewal	Francisco Chahuán	105,123	28.2	New senator
Coalition for Change	UDI	Joaquín Lavín	103,762	27.9	
Concertación	PDC	Hernán Pinto	22,447	6.00	
New Majority for Chile	Independent	Juan Guzmán	14,784	4.0	
Clean Chile, Vote Happy	Regionalist	Raúl Silva	2,773	0.7	

==== Maule North ====
Pact	Party	Candidate	Votes	%	Result
Coalition for Change	UDI	Juan Antonio Coloma	96,844	35.2	Hold his seat
Concertación	PDC	Andrés Zaldívar	86,266	31.3	Holding in a new seat
Concertación	Socialist	Jaime Gazmuri	67,586	24.6	Lost his seat
Coalition for Change	National Renewal	Robert Morrison	17,548	6.3	
New Majority for Chile	Humanist	Mercedes Bravo	6,942	2.5	

==== Maule South ====
Pact	Party	Candidate	Votes	%	Result
Coalition for Change	UDI	Hernán Larraín	67,461	43.1	Hold his seat
Concertación	PDC	Ximena Rincón	48,607	31.0	New senator
Concertación	Socialist	Jaime Naranjo	32,867	21.0	Lost his seat
Coalition for Change	Independent	Juan Ariztía	6,110	3.9	
New Majority for Chile	Humanist	Marilén Cabrera	1,567	1.0	

==== Araucanía North ====
Pact	Party	Candidate	Votes	%	Result
Coalition for Change	National Renewal	Alberto Espina	52,082	38.5	Hold his seat
Concertación	For Democracy	Jaime Quintana	40,120	29.7	New senator
Concertación	PDC	Tomás Jocelyn-Holt	7,481	5.5	
Coalition for Change	Independent	Cecilia Villouta	7,255	5.4	
New Majority for Chile	Humanist	Juan Enrique Prieto	1,611	1.2	
Clean Chile, Vote Happy	Independent	Roberto Muñoz	20,126	14.9	
Clean Chile, Vote Happy	Independent	Enrique Sanhueza	6,574	4.9	

==== Araucanía South ====
Pact	Party	Candidate	Votes	%	Result
Concertación	For Democracy	Eugenio Tuma	74,207	29.1	New senator
Coalition for Change	National Renewal	José García Ruminot	57,260	22.4	Hold his seat
Coalition for Change	UDI	Ena von Baer	56,578	22.2	
Concertación	PDC	Francisco Huenchumilla	51,338	20.1	
Clean Chile, Vote Happy	Regionalist	Eduardo Díaz del Río	11,464	4.5	
New Majority for Chile	Humanist	Luis Fernando Vivanco	2,779	1.1	
Clean Chile, Vote Happy	Independent	José Villagrán	1,512	0.6	

==== Aysen ====
Pact	Party	Candidate	Votes	%	Result
Coalition for Change	National Renewal	Antonio Horvath	14,193	34.6	Hold his seat
Concertación	PDC	Patricio Walker	11,293	27.5	New senator
Clean Chile, Vote Happy	Regionalist	Eduardo Cruces	6,958	17.0	
Clean Chile, Vote Happy	Regionalist	Paz Foitzich	4,613	11.2	
Concertación	Social Democrat Radical	Ernesto Velasco	3,940	9.6	

== Timeline ==
- 13 September 2009: deadline to enroll to vote in the upcoming elections.
- 14 September 2009: deadline to register candidacies at the Electoral Service (Servel).
- 14 September 2009: electoral campaign begins.
- 5 October 2009: draw supervised by Servel to assign a ballot number to each candidate.
- 13 November 2009: electoral advertisement period starts.
- 10 December 2009: electoral advertisement period ends.
- 13 December 2009: election day. Electoral campaigning ends.
- 13 December 2009: first preliminary results are announced by the Deputy Interior Minister at 6:30 p.m. local time (9:30 p.m. UTC), including 4,342 out of 34,348 ballot boxes (12.64%).
- 13 December 2009: second preliminary results are announced by the Deputy Interior Minister at 8:03 p.m. local time (11:03 p.m. UTC), including 20,595 ballot boxes (59.96%).
- 13 December 2009: third preliminary results are announced by the Deputy Interior Minister at 10:56 p.m. local time (1:56 a.m. UTC), including 33,756 ballot boxes (98.28%).
- 14 December 2009: fourth and final preliminary results are announced by the Deputy Interior Minister at 11:05 a.m. local time (2:05 p.m. UTC), including 34,133 ballot boxes (99.37%).
- 21 December 2009: the Electoral Service (Servel) publishes preliminary results based on the examination of election certificates (actas de escrutinio) by the Tellers' Colleges (Colegios Escrutadores) meeting on 14 December 2009, including 34,263 out of 34,348 ballot boxes (99.75%).
- 29 December 2009: the Tricel publishes the final results of the first round election on the Official Gazette.
- 3 January 2009: electoral advertisement period for runoff election starts.
- 7 January 2009: ballot number is assigned to each candidate according to their position in the first draw.
- 14 January 2009: electoral advertisement period ends.
- 17 January 2010: date of presidential run-off. Electoral campaigning ends.
- 17 January 2010: first preliminary results are announced by the Deputy Interior Ministry at 6:00 p.m. local time (9:00 p.m. UTC), including results from 20,711 out of 34,348 ballot boxes (60.30%).
- 17 January 2010: Eduardo Frei concedes the election to Sebastián Piñera at 6:44 p.m. local time (9:44 p.m. UTC).
- 17 January 2010: second preliminary results are announced by the Deputy Interior Ministry at 7:40 p.m. local time (10:40 p.m. UTC), including results from 34,056 ballot boxes (99.15%).
- 18 January 2010: third and final preliminary results are announced by the Deputy Interior Ministry at 11:00 a.m. local time (2:00 p.m. UTC), including results from 34,252 ballot boxes (99.72%).
- 29 January 2010: the Election Qualifying Court (Tricel) officially proclaims PIñera as President-elect.
- 30 January 2010: the Tricel publishes the Act of Proclamation on the Official Gazette.
- 3 February 2010: the Tricel publishes the final results of the runoff election on its website.
