= Mariano Fernández (Chilean diplomat) =

Chilean diplomat (born 1945)

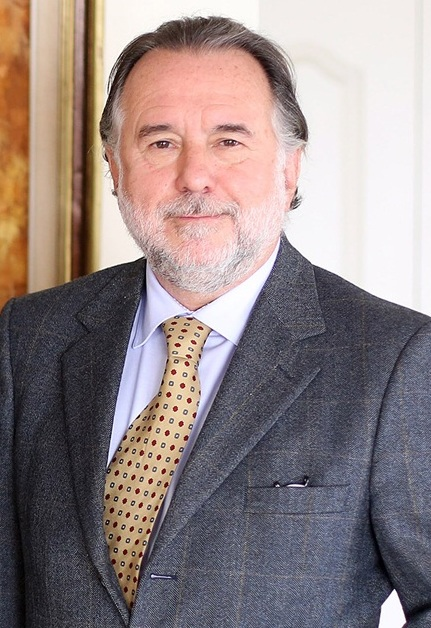

Minister of Foreign Affairs
- In office 13 March 2009 – 11 March 2010
- President: Michelle Bachelet
- Preceded by: Alejandro Foxley
- Succeeded by: Alfredo Moreno Charme

Personal details
- Born: 21 April 1945 (age 81) Santiago, Chile
- Party: Christian Democratic Party (DC)
- Spouse: María Angélica Morales
- Children: Three
- Parent(s): Mariano Fernández M. María Amunátegui
- Education: Pontifical Catholic University of Chile (LL.B); University of Bonn (M.Sc)
- Profession: Lawyer

Mariano Fernández (born 21 April 1945), a native of Chile, served as the Special Representative for Haiti and Head of the United Nations Stabilization Mission in Haiti (MINUSTAH). He was appointed to this position by the United Nations Secretary-General Ban Ki-moon on 16 May 2011.

A veteran diplomat, Fernández held various high-ranking positions in the foreign service of the Government of Chile. From 2009 to 2010, he was the Minister of Foreign Affairs of Chile. From 2006 to 2009, he serves as Chile's Ambassador to the United States.

Prior to that, he was Ambassador to a number of European countries and the EU including Great Britain (2002–2006), Spain (2000–2002) and Italy (1992–1994) and in the Chilean Mission to the European Union (1990–1992). He was the Commissioner to the International Whaling Commission from 2003 to 2007.

In addition to his experience in diplomacy, Fernández also held a variety of positions in civil society, including a member of the Board of Directors of Radio Cooperativa, Vice-chairman of the Italian-Latin-American Institute (ILAI) (1992–1994) and President of the Institute for European-Latin American Relations (IRELA) (1992–1994).

Fernández studied law at the Catholic University in Santiago, Chile, and social science research methods at the University of Bonn in Germany. He is married to María Angélica Morales and has three children.

== Biography ==
=== Family and education ===
He is the son of lawyer Mariano Fernández Méndez and María Angélica Amunátegui. He studied at St. Ignatius College, Santiago and at Liceo Valentín Letelier de Santiago ―Valentín Letelier High School―. He then studied law at the Pontifical Catholic University of Chile, graduating in 1970.

Since 1969, he has been married to María Angélica Morales, with whom he had three children: Magdalena, Mariano and Cristóbal. He also has seven grandchildren.

=== Academic career ===
Fernández served as president and vice president of the Institute for European-Latin American Relations (IRELA) in Madrid, Spain, and as vice president of the Italo-Latin American Institute (IILA) in Rome, Italy.

In addition, he served as a member of the Executive Committee of the Jacques Maritain Institute.

== Political career ==
=== Early career and exile ===
In 1967, he joined the Ministry of Foreign Affairs, serving as Third Secretary at his country's embassy in the Federal Republic of Germany (1971–1974). In 1970, he was diplomatic secretary of the Chilean delegation to the Special General Assembly of the Organization of American States (OAS).

He lived in exile in Germany between 1974 and 1982, during which time he pursued postgraduate studies in political sociology at the University of Bonn (1975–1977).

Upon returning to Chile, he worked as a researcher and member of the Executive Committee of the Center for Development Studies (1982–1990).

=== Concertación era ===
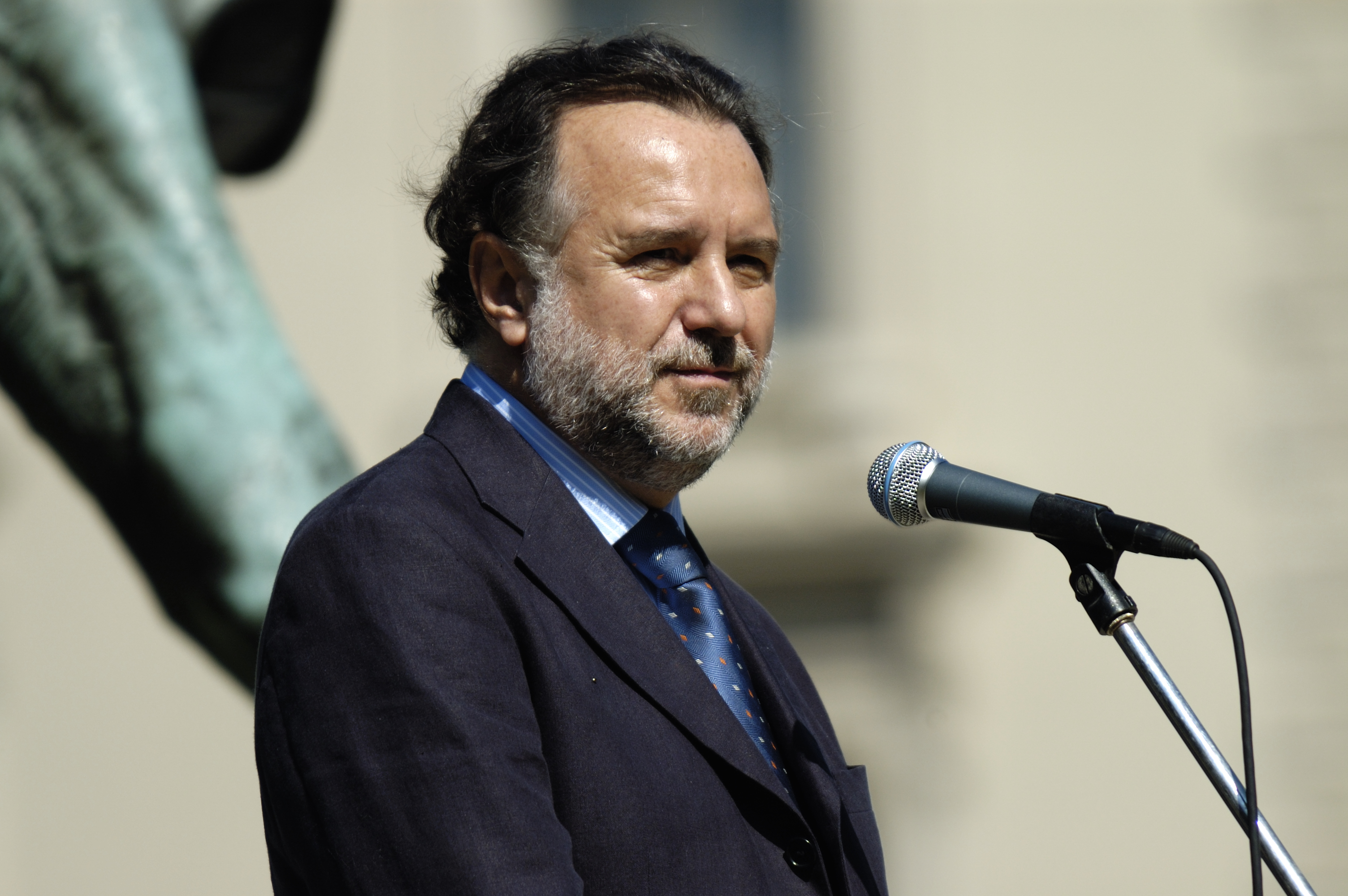
Fernández in 2006.

During the Concertación governments that followed the military dictatorship, he served as Chile's political ambassador to Belgium and the European Community (1990–1992), Italy (1992–1994), Spain (2000–2002), and the United Kingdom (2002–2004).

Between 1994 and 2000, during the administration of Eduardo Frei Ruiz-Tagle, he served as Undersecretary of Foreign Affairs.

In 2006, he became Chile's political ambassador to the United States, where he witnessed the historic election and subsequent inauguration of Democrat Barack Obama in Washington, D.C.

In March 2009, he was appointed Minister of Foreign Affairs by President Michelle Bachelet, a position he held until the end of the administration on 11 March 2010. In July of that year, he publicly announced his intention to run for the presidency of the Christian Democratic Party, receiving support from, among others, deputy Roberto León, former Minister of the National Women's Service Laura Albornoz, former Interior Minister Belisario Velasco, and deputy Pablo Lorenzini. He was defeated by a wide margin by fellow former foreign minister Ignacio Walker.

=== Head of MINUSTAH ===
In May 2011, United Nations Secretary-General Ban Ki-moon appointed him Special Representative for Haiti. Fernández assumed the post in Port-au-Prince on 27 June, as head of the United Nations Stabilisation Mission in Haiti (MINUSTAH), replacing Guatemalan diplomat Edmond Mulet, who had served temporarily in the role following the 2010 Haiti earthquake.

=== Late career ===
In April 2014, he unsuccessfully sought to fill the Senate seat vacated by Ximena Rincón after her appointment as a cabinet minister by Michelle Bachelet during her second administration. Fernández lost in a party primary to Manuel Antonio Matta, who was sworn in the following month as senator for South Maule.

In July 2014, he was appointed Chilean ambassador to Germany. He currently serves as ambassador to the Holy See in Rome, a position he has held since April 2016.
