= Coalition for Change =

Coalition for Change may refer to:

- Coalition for Change (Chile), 2009–2013
- Coalition for Change (Georgia), in the country of Georgia, formed in 2024
- Coalition for Change (Philippines), 2016–2022

== See also ==
- Citizens Coalition for Change, Zimbabwe, formed in 2022
- Coalition for Democratic Change, Liberia, formed in 2017
- Coalition of Change for Unity, Indonesia, 2023–2024
- Coalition of Patriots for Change, Central African Republic, formed in 2020
