= 2008 Chilean municipal election =

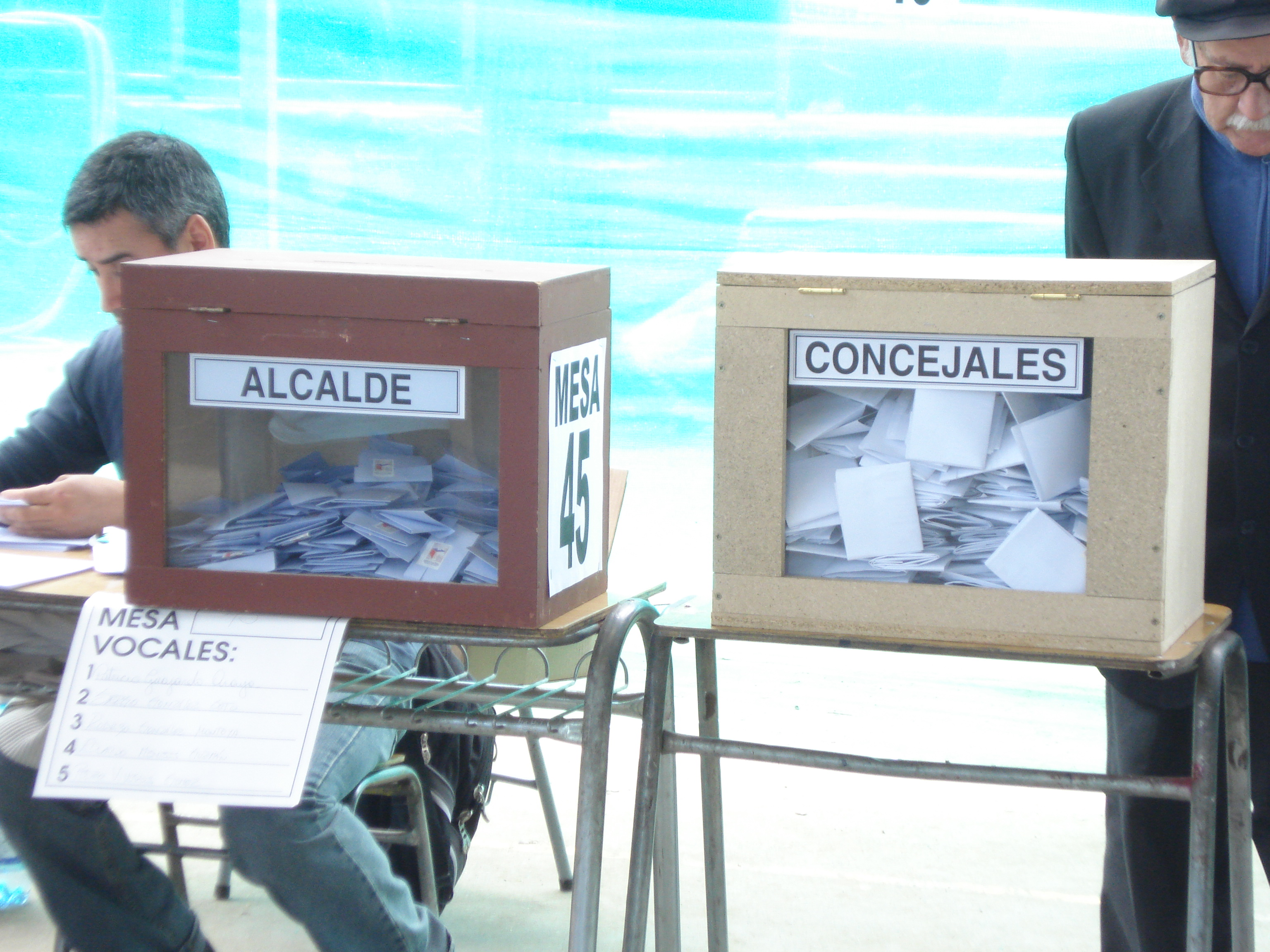
Ballot boxes for votes for mayors and council people, seen on a polling station in Peñalolén.

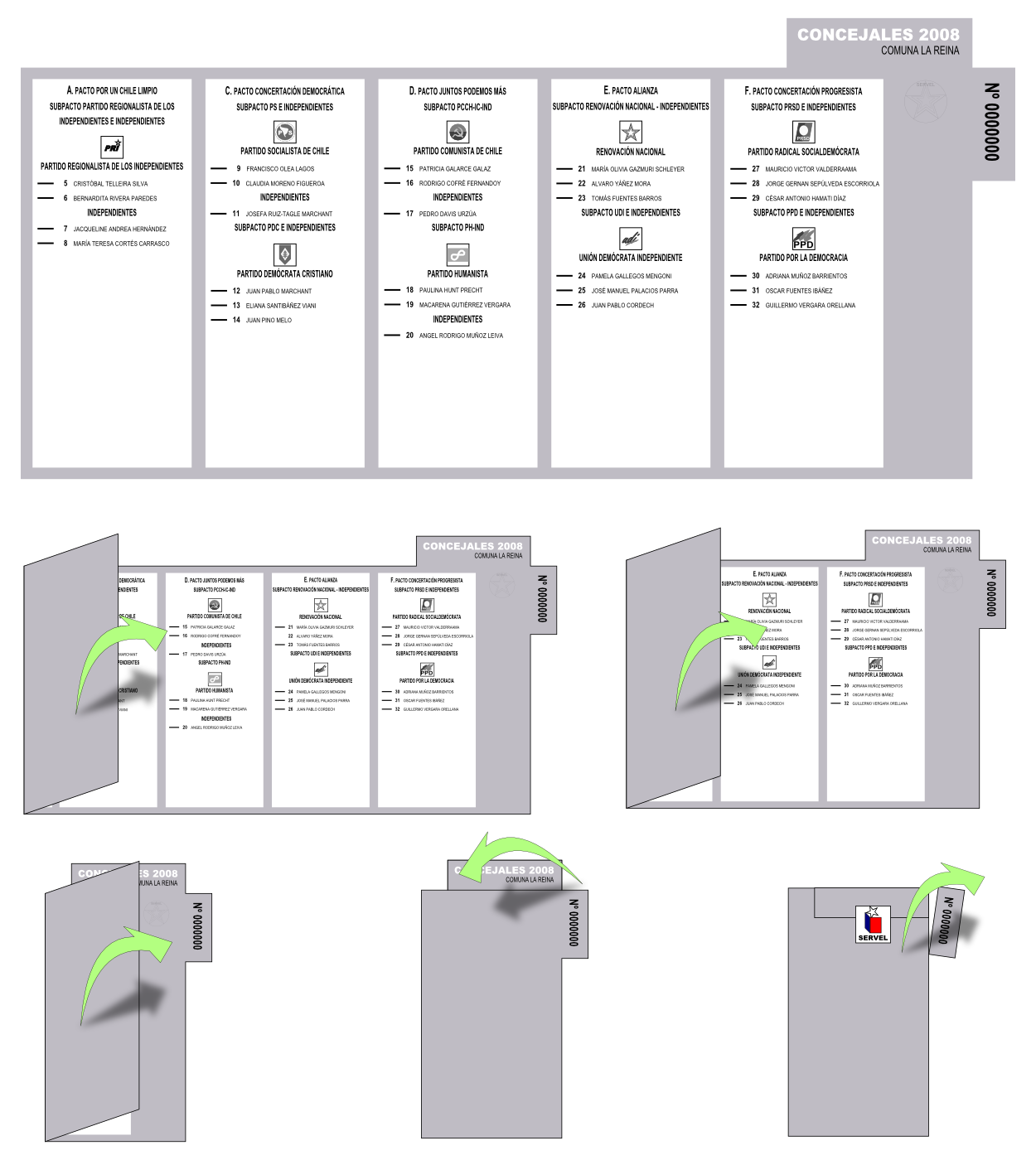
A mock councilmen ballot for the La Reina municipality.

A municipal election took place in Chile on October 26, 2008. The newly elected mayors and councilmen began their term on December 6, 2008.

== Results ==
=== Mayoral election ===
Official and final results.

List/Party	Votes	%	Candidates	Elected
List A - Por un Chile Limpio	254,610	4.00	103	8
Partido Regionalista de los Independientes	55,556	0.87	37	2
Independents List A	199,054	3.13	66	6
List B - La Fuerza del Norte	25,571	0.40	4	1
Fuerza País	1,166	0.02	1	0
Independents List B	24,405	0.38	3	1
List C - Concertación Democrática	1,826,824	28.71	227	101
Partido Demócrata Cristiano de Chile	1,143,898	17.98	136	59
Partido Socialista de Chile	594,186	9.34	72	30
Independents List C	88,740	1.39	19	12
List D - Juntos Podemos Más	402,661	6.33	191	7
Partido Comunista de Chile	157,414	2.47	76	4
Partido Humanista	85,528	1.34	30	1
Independents List D	159,719	2.51	85	2
List E - Alianza	2,586,754	40.66	340	144
Renovación Nacional	841,431	13.23	121	55
Unión Demócrata Independiente	1,275,653	20.05	129	58
Independents List E	469,670	7.38	90	31
List F - Concertación Progresista	618,685	9.72	102	46
Partido por la Democracia	442,498	6.96	65	35
Partido Radical Socialdemócrata	152,200	2.39	28	10
Independents List F	23,987	0.38	9	1
Independents (out of pact)	647,025	10.17	264	38
Valid votes	6,362,130	100.00	1,231	345
Null votes	407,103	5.85		
Blank votes	189,842	2.73		
Total votes	6,959,075	100.00		
Total voters enrolled	8,110,265	85.81% turnout		
Voting age population	12,035,307	67.39% registered		

=== Councilmen election ===
Official and final results.

Party	Votes	%	Candidates	Elected
List A - Por un Chile Limpio	459,993	7.56	1,429	117
Partido Regionalista de los Independientes	224,194	3.68	639	64
Partido Ecologista	4,297	0.07	11	0
Independents List A	231,502	3.80	779	53
List B - La Fuerza del Norte	35,232	0.58	37	7
Fuerza País	1,648	0.03	5	1
Independents List B	33,584	0.55	32	6
List C - Concertación Democrática	1,694,494	27.84	2,092	677
Partido Demócrata Cristiano de Chile	849,714	13.96	887	344
Partido Socialista de Chile	679,982	11.17	832	250
Independents List C	164,798	2.71	373	83
List D - Juntos Podemos Más	555,329	9.12	1,589	79
Partido Comunista de Chile	305,990	5.03	560	45
Partido Humanista	114,400	1.88	417	13
Partido Izquierda Cristiana de Chile	2,606	0.04	10	0
Independents List D	132,333	2.17	602	21
List E - Alianza	2,194,528	36.05	2,123	861
Renovación Nacional	980,196	16.10	834	389
Unión Demócrata Independiente	919,765	15.11	864	347
Independents List E	294,567	4.84	425	125
List F - Concertación Progresista	1,052,333	17.29	2,013	393
Partido por la Democracia	517,469	8.50	678	200
Partido Radical Socialdemócrata	316,975	5.21	713	112
Independents List F	217,889	3.58	622	81
Independents (out of pact)	94,986	1.56	203	12
Valid votes	6,086,895	100.00	9,486	2,146
Null votes	568,778	8.18		
Blank votes	294,835	4.24		
Total votes	6,950,508	100.00		
Total voters enrolled	8,110,265	85.70% turnout		
Voting age population	12,035,307	67.39% registered		
