= Jorge Ulloa =

Chilean politician (born 1958)

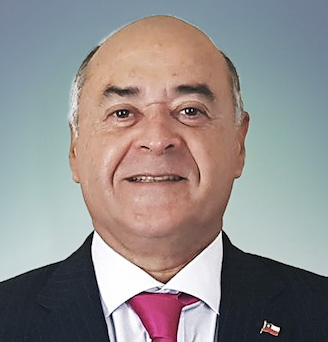
- Official portrait (2018)

Ambassador of Chile in Paraguay
- In office 27 August 2019 – 11 March 2022
- Preceded by: Alejandro Bahamondes

Intendant of the Bío-Bío Region
- In office 11 March 2018 – 16 April 2019
- Preceded by: Rodrigo Díaz Worner
- Succeeded by: Sergio Giacaman

Member of the Chamber of Deputies
- In office 11 March 1990 – 11 March 2018
- Preceded by: District created
- Succeeded by: District dissolved
- Constituency: 43rd District

Personal details
- Born: 15 September 1958 (age 68) Talcahuano, Chile
- Party: Unión Demócrata Independiente
- Spouse: Siomara Concha
- Children: Three
- Parent(s): Rubén Ulloa Castro; María Teresa de Jesús Aguillón
- Education: University of Concepción; Pontifical Catholic University of Chile (M.D)
- Occupation: Politician
- Profession: Teacher of History

Jorge Iván Ulloa Aguillón (born 15 September 1958) is a Chilean politician who currently serves as the Chilean ambassador to Paraguay. He was close to Manuel Contreras.

On January 8, 1993, while a deputy, he held a six hour long filibuster in the Chamber of Deputies to allow Pablo Longueira arrive from Concepción and vote on an accusation against various ministers of the Supreme Court and the General Comptroller of the Chilean Army.

== Biography ==
Ulloa was born on 16 September 1958 in Talcahuano. He is the son of Rubén Ulloa Castro and María Teresa de Jesús Aguillón. He is married to Siomara Concha and has three children.

He completed his primary education at School No. 25 of the Naval Base of Talcahuano and his secondary studies at the Salesianos School in Concepción, graduating in 1975.

He continued his studies at the University of Concepción, where he obtained a degree as a teacher of History and Geography in 1980. In 1987, he completed a Master’s degree in Political Science, with a specialization in Institutions and Political Processes, at the Pontifical Catholic University of Chile.

Professionally, he served as deputy director of the Diego Portales Professional Institute in Concepción. He also served as director of the Diego Portales Technical Training Center at its campuses in Viña del Mar, Santiago and Concepción.

In addition, he was a lecturer at the University of the Most Holy Conception, teaching Introduction to Political Science and Political Theory. Concurrently, he was engaged in agricultural activities, including the cultivation of kiwis and vineyards.

== Political career ==
Ulloa began his political career as a leader of the Student Center of the History and Geography Pedagogy program at the University of Concepción. In 1976, he participated in the founding of the university’s Student Center and served as secretary general for several terms.

In 1980, he was appointed provincial secretary of Youth in Ñuble and adviser to the National Secretariat. In 1987, he was part of the founding group of National Renewal (RN), from which he withdrew in 1988 to participate in the founding of the Independent Democratic Union (UDI). Within the latter party, he served as its first regional secretary in Biobío.

Between 1994 and 1997, he served as national vice president of the UDI, and later, between 2006 and 2008, as regional president.

Ulloa held the position of municipal director of the Education System of Curanilahue, and in 1988 he was appointed mayor of the Commune of Lebu, serving for one year.

He served as Intendant of the Biobío Region between 11 March 2018 and 12 April 2019, under the second government of President Sebastián Piñera. Since 27 August 2019, he has served as Ambassador of Chile to Paraguay.

In 2023, he ran as a candidate for the Constitutional Council representing the UDI on the Chile Seguro list in the Biobío Region, but was not elected, finishing fourth in vote share (7.61%).

In late July 2024, he registered his candidacy for mayor of the Municipality of Quillón representing the UDI, but was not elected in the elections held on 26 and 27 October.
