= Independent Democratic Union =

Chilean political party

Independent Democratic Union Unión Demócrata Independiente
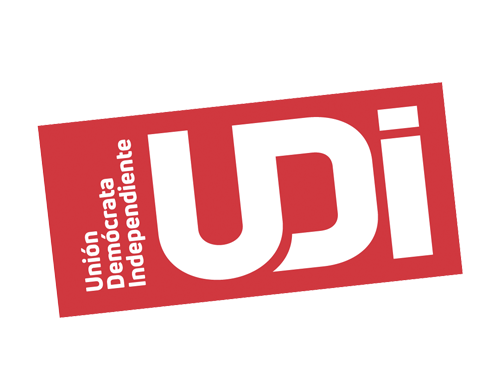
- Abbreviation: UDI
- President: Guillermo Ramírez
- Secretary-General: Juan Antonio Coloma
- Chief of Deputies: Flor Weisse
- Chief of Senators: Gustavo Sanhueza
- Founder: Jaime Guzmán
- Founded: September 24, 1983
- Headquarters: Suecia 286, Providencia, Santiago de Chile
- Youth wing: Nuevas Generaciones UDI
- Membership (2026): 30,810 (7th)
- Ideology: Conservatism; Liberal conservatism Christian right Economic liberalism Guildism: Right-wing populism; Anti-communism; Neoliberalism; Factions: Social conservatism Pinochetism; Piñerism
- Political position: Right-wing
- National affiliation: Chile Vamos (since 2015); Chile Grande y Unido (since 2025)
- International affiliation: International Democracy Union
- Regional affiliation: Union of Latin American Parties
- Colours: Blue, White and Yellow
- Chamber of Deputies: 18 / 155
- Senate: 5 / 50
- Regional boards: 37 / 302
- Mayors: 22 / 345
- Communal Councils: 173 / 2,252

Website
- www.udi.cl
- Politics of Chile; Political parties; Elections; A: It was originally considered a far-right party due to the support of its members gave to the dictatorship of Augusto Pinochet. However, since the early 21st century, the party has represented a pragmatic opposition to the Concertación; and part of the moderate right—especially in light of the creation of the Republican Party, which is positioned further to the right.

The Independent Democratic Union (Spanish: Unión Demócrata Independiente, UDI) is a conservative and right-wing political party in Chile, founded in 1983. Its founder was the lawyer, politician, law professor and senator Jaime Guzmán, a civilian allied with Augusto Pinochet.

Its ideological origins date back to Guzmán's Guildist Movement, born out of the Pontifical Catholic University of Chile in 1966, espousing the independence and depoliticization of intermediate bodies of civil society. The UDI is today a conservative political party with strong links to the Opus Dei, that opposes abortion in nearly all or all cases.

UDI has for most of its history formed coalitions with National Renewal (RN) and other minor movements under different names such as; Participación y Progreso (1992), Unión por el Progreso de Chile (1993), Alliance for Chile (1999–2009, 2013), Coalition for Change (2009–2012) and Chile Vamos (2015–present). UDI was the largest political party in Congress between 2010 and 2014. The party has been part of the government coalition twice, from 2010 to 2014 and 2018 to 2022.

The party has liberal-conservative and social-conservative factions. The social-conservative faction is characterised by its political work in poor sectors, while the liberal-conservative faction is characterised by its connections to Chile's business class, its links to think tanks such as Libertad y Desarrollo (LyD), and its training of young political leaders, often students from the Pontifical Catholic University of Chile (PUC) such as Jaime Bellolio or Javier Macaya.

== History ==
=== Origins (1967–1988) ===
It was during the university strikes of the 1960s when Jaime Guzmán, President of the Law Students Union at the Pontifical Catholic University of Chile, who opposed the protests and strikes led by the Christian-democrats and left-wing students- gathered a group of students and founded the Movimiento Gremial (Guildist Movement) and ran for the university's Student Union (Federación de Estudiantes) election. The movement quickly became one of the most important in the Catholic University, and later won the presidency of the university's Student Union.

Jaime Guzmán criticized liberal democracy and sought inspiration in authoritarian corporatism, proposing the principle of subsidiarity and to invigorate intermediate social movements, by the way that these were independent to develop their own specific purposes. Well into the government of Salvador Allende, some young members of the National Party and the Christian Democrats became part of the Gremialismo Movement of Jaime Guzmán.

Guzmán supported a military coup against Allende's government, which happened shortly thereafter on September 11, 1973 (see: Chilean coup of 1973). He was a close advisor of General Augusto Pinochet. Guzmán was later appointed a member of the Commission for the Study of the New Constitution, who worded the new constitution promulgated in 1980.

After the 1982 economic crisis, which caused the temporary removal of the "Chicago Boys" from cabinet, Guzmán moved away from the government and decided to found the movement he desired, establishing it on September 24, 1983, under the name Independent Democratic Union Movement (Movimiento Unión Demócrata Independiente).

The emerging movement, a supporter of the military government, had (as opposed to the traditional right-wing political groups) a strong empathy with the lower classes, in order to seize from the Marxist left its traditional domain. Amid the growing economic crisis of the time, UDI engaged in empowering leaders in the countryside and peripheral neighbourhoods that would help extend its influence in the middle and lower classes. One of them was Simon Yévenes, UDI member assassinated by left-wing resistance fighters on April 2, 1986.

On April 29, 1987, the Independent Democratic Union merged with other related movements such as National Union Movement, led by Andrés Allamand, and National Labour Front, led by Sergio Onofre Jarpa, plus some former members and supporters of the National Party and the Christian Democrats, to form the National Renewal party (RN), who managed briefly to unite all the right movements in the country. However, UDI members maintained their own identity in the new party, which caused a crisis in 1988, culminating in the resignation of all former UDI members to National Renewal. Allamand stayed in charge of National Renewal, while Jaime Guzman managed to register a new political party: the Independent Democratic Union in 1989.

=== End of dictatorship (1988–1989) ===
UDI strongly supported Pinochet's remaining in power in the 1988 Chilean national plebiscite. After the "Yes" option was defeated and presidential elections were announced, the UDI joined National Renewal and formed the "Democracy and Progress" alliance (Democracia y Progreso). Hernan Büchi, the former Minister of Finances under Pinochet, ran for president for this alliance. The alliance also ran a common Parliament list. The UDI's option lost the 1989 presidential election, this time against the center-left Concertación's leader, the Christian Democrat Patricio Aylwin.

In the 1989 parliamentary elections, the Independent Democratic Union obtained a 9.82% of votes in deputies (14 deputies out of 120) and 5.11% in the Senate (2 senators elected on 38). Jaime Guzmán won a seat as Senator for Western Santiago constituency. Although Guzman took third place with only 17% of the vote, behind Christian Democrat Andrés Zaldívar and Party for Democracy leader Ricardo Lagos, the two main leaders of the Coalition of Parties for Democracy, the binomial system allowed Zaldívar's and his election and deferred Ricardo Lagos who got 30%.

=== Growth and opposition (1989–2003) ===
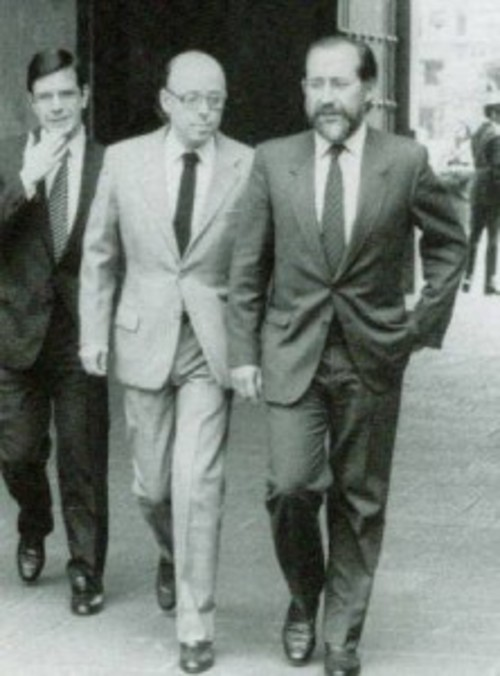
Joaquín Lavín, Jaime Guzmán and Jovino Novoa. c. 1990.

By 1990, Guzman was positioned as the leader of the opposition and was one of the harshest critics of the new democratic government, accusing it of softness in the fight against left-wing armed organizations which kept operating in Chile after the restoration of restricted democracy. On April 1, 1991, Guzmán was shot dead by members of the armed left-wing group Manuel Rodriguez Patriotic Front (Frente Patriótico Manuel Rodríguez), after leaving his lecture of Constitutional Law at the Pontifical Catholic University of Chile. He was replaced as senator by the National Renewal candidate for the same constituency, Miguel Otero.

The Independent Democratic Union remained as a minor party in the early years of transition, compared with its ally National Renewal, but over the years managed to win preferences, match and surpass them. In subsequent elections, UDI began to grow noticeably: got 12.11% in a congressional election in 1993, a 14.45% in elections in 1997 and 25.19% in the 2001 elections, when it became the largest party in Chile, removing that title to the Christian Democrats.

In 1998, when Pinochet was arrested in London, the UDI and National Renewal pressed the Frei government to return him to Chile.

In 1999, Joaquín Lavín, the mayor of Las Condes and member of UDI, was proclaimed as the Alliance for Chile candidate for the presidential election. Even as a relatively new face, a moderate support for Augusto Pinochet and a proposal eminently pragmatic rather than dogmatic, took him to get the 47.51% of the votes against the Concertación candidate Ricardo Lagos on the first ballot, with a difference of about 30,000 votes (i.e., almost one vote per polling place). Finally, in January 2000, Lavín got 48.69% of the votes against 51.31% of Lagos in the second round. That was the highest percentage of the vote received by any right-wing presidential candidate in the 20th century in Chile.

During the first half of the presidential term of Ricardo Lagos (2000–2006), UDI established itself as a relevant political actor of the opposition. Proof of this are the results of UDI in the 2000 municipal elections, the parliamentary elections of 2001, and the Lagos-Longueira agreement of January 17, 2003 to modernize the State administration and give a consensual political solution to Inverlink case and MOP-Gate case, which affected the institutional stability of the Lagos administration. The result of this is the election finance law, high public management law and others. During this period, especially outstanding figure is the party president, Pablo Longueira.

A milestone in the party's image came in 2003 when Longueira reported in a TV interview that he met with relatives of Disappeared Detainees, who saw the party as a serious and reliable institution, through which they could get some of the solutions that Socialist governments had not granted them. Of these numerous meetings, arose the document "Peace Now" ("La Paz Ahora"), which sought to give a sign of national reconciliation.

=== Disputes with National Renewal (2003–2006) ===
Also in 2003, stressed the frictions and conflicts between RN and UDI, mainly due to a dispute between the parties for the leadership within the Alliance for Chile, as well as personal disagreements between the presidents of both parties, Pablo Longueira and Sebastián Piñera. That is Joaquin Lavin, who was then leader of the Alliance for Chile and only presidential candidate, had suddenly and publicly call on both the resignation from their posts.

In 2005, UDI selected Joaquín Lavín for presidential elections again, but National Renewal launched its own candidate, the millionaire businessman and former senator Sebastián Piñera. Attempts to choose a single candidate for the right-wing failed. Piñera got second in the election, and there was a runoff between him and the Concertación candidate, Michelle Bachelet. Lavín urged his supporters to vote for Piñera, whom he endorsed wholeheartedly. However, in the 2006 runoff, Piñera was defeated by Bachelet. In the 2005 parliamentary elections, UDI maintained its status as largest party in Congress, electing 33 out of 120 deputies.

=== Michelle Bachelet first administration (2006–2010) ===
During the government of Michelle Bachelet (2006–2010), UDI was the majority party in both houses of Congress and successfully fought the municipal election of 2008. At the internal level, in July 2008 was first presented two lists to lead the party: one headed by Juan Antonio Coloma and Victor Perez Varela (who had the backing of the historical leaders of the party) and one by Jose Antonio Kast and Rodrigo Alvarez (supported mainly by the younger members). Coloma got 63% of member votes.

Coloma's board immediately got down to the details of the upcoming 2008 Chilean municipal election, and just finished it, the preparations for next year's parliamentary and presidential election. In December 2008, the highest party leaders decided to forgo the option to offer the country a UDI presidential candidate and provided support for Piñera's candidacy in order to avoid a fifth consecutive Concertacion government. This decision was ratified later, unanimously by party members, August 22, 2009.

In the 2008 Chilean municipal election, UDI won 347 councilm seats (16.16% of the total) with 15.11% of the popular vote becoming the party with the highest number of elected councilors and the most voted party in the councilor elections. It also secured 58 mayoralties (16.81% of mayors) with 20.05% of the vote ranking second in the number of elected mayors with only one mayor less than Partido Demócrata Cristiano de Chile).

In the 2009 Chilean parliamentary election, UDI held the largest plurality in the election of deputies, electing 40 deputies (one third of the House) with 23.04% (1,507,001 votes), and got 21.21% (369,594 votes) in the election of senators. This made the UDI the largest bench obtained by a single party in Chile since 1990 holding 39 deputies and 8 senators.

=== Sebastián Piñera first administration (2010–2014) ===
Sebastián Piñera, candidate of the Coalition for Change, was elected President of Chile in the runoff held on January 17, 2010, defeating Senator Eduardo Frei Ruiz-Tagle with 51.6% of the vote. He assumed office on March 11, 2010. After the 2009 Chilean parliamentary election, UDI consolidated its position as the largest party in Congress, winning 40 out of 120 seats in the Chamber of Deputies—the largest caucus obtained by a single party since the return to democracy in 1990.

In August 2010, the party held internal elections for its presidency, in which Juan Antonio Coloma defeated José Antonio Kast for the second consecutive time, obtaining over 67% of the votes.

Several UDI members held prominent positions in Piñera's cabinet. Among them were Joaquín Lavín, who initially served as Minister of Education and faced the 2011–2013 Chilean student protests before being reassigned to the Ministry of Social Development; Pablo Longueira, who served as Minister of Economy; Andrés Chadwick, who became Minister of the Interior and Public Security; and Laurence Golborne, who served as Minister of Mining during the 2010 Copiapó mining accident and later as Minister of Public Works.

During Piñera's term, UDI exerted significant influence on government policy, promoting a conservative stance on cultural and educational issues. The administration adopted a moderate approach on social measures such as the extension of maternity leave, tax adjustments, and the discussion of civil unions for same-sex couples, while UDI strongly opposed any initiative to legalize therapeutic abortion.

In the 2013 primaries of the Alliance, UDI nominated former Economy Minister Pablo Longueira, who defeated Andrés Allamand of National Renewal. However, Longueira withdrew from the race in July 2013 due to depression, and UDI replaced him with Evelyn Matthei. In the first round of the presidential election, Matthei obtained 25.03% of the vote, the second-worst result for the right since 1990. In the runoff, she was defeated by Michelle Bachelet with 62.17% against 37.83%, the largest margin of victory in a Chilean presidential election since 1993.

=== Michelle Bachelet second administration (2014–2018) ===
The Independent Democratic Union (UDI) played a leading role in the opposition to the second government of Michelle Bachelet. In Congress, the party opposed most of the administration's flagship reforms, including the tax reform, the replacement of the binomial electoral system, the prohibition of profit in state-subsidized education, labor law reform, the decriminalization of abortion on three grounds (risk to the mother, fetal inviability, and rape), and the proposal to draft a new constitution. UDI also rejected initiatives on same-sex marriage, which were introduced during this period.

In 2015, the party helped create a new center-right coalition, Chile Vamos, alongside National Renewal and Evópoli, replacing the previous Alliance for Chile.

Penta and campaign finance scandals

Between 2014 and 2015, UDI faced one of the most severe crises in its history following revelations of irregular campaign financing and alleged links to major corporate groups such as Penta, Soquimich (SQM), and Corpesca. These scandals had political and judicial repercussions: several party members, including former ministers, senators, and deputies, were investigated and some convicted for tax-related offenses, although most received fines or suspended sentences. The controversies significantly damaged the party's public image and approval ratings.

2016 municipal elections and recovery

Despite the scandals, UDI regained electoral strength in the 2016 Chilean municipal elections, becoming the most voted party in the country with 19.4% of the vote. It won 145 mayoralties (including several major municipalities such as Las Condes, Providencia, and Puente Alto) and more than 900 council seats.

2017 general election

For the 2017 Chilean general election, UDI supported former president Sebastián Piñera, the candidate of Chile Vamos, who returned to power after defeating Alejandro Guillier in the runoff. In the parliamentary elections, UDI secured 30 seats in the Chamber of Deputies, once again becoming the largest single party in the legislature, and won 9 seats in the Senate. The party continued to oppose initiatives such as same-sex marriage, which was debated during the final months of Bachelet's administration.

== Presidential candidates ==
The following is a list of the presidential candidates supported by the Independent Democratic Union. (Information gathered from the Archive of Chilean Elections).

- 1988 plebiscite: In favor of Augusto Pinochet (lost)
- 1989: Hernán Büchi (lost)
- 1993: Arturo Alessandri Besa (lost)
- 1999: Joaquín Lavín (lost)
- 2005: Joaquín Lavín (lost)
- 2009: Sebastián Piñera (won)
- 2013: Evelyn Matthei (lost)
- 2017: Sebastián Piñera (won)
- 2021: Sebastián Sichel (lost)
- 2025: Evelyn Matthei (lost)

== Party emblems ==
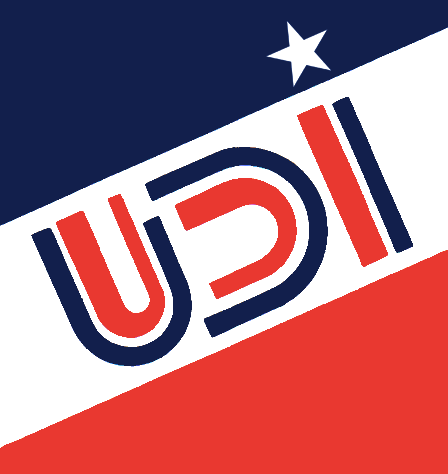
1983–1989

1989–2005

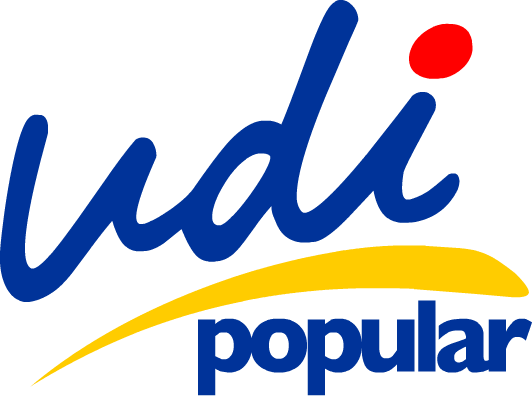
2005–2016

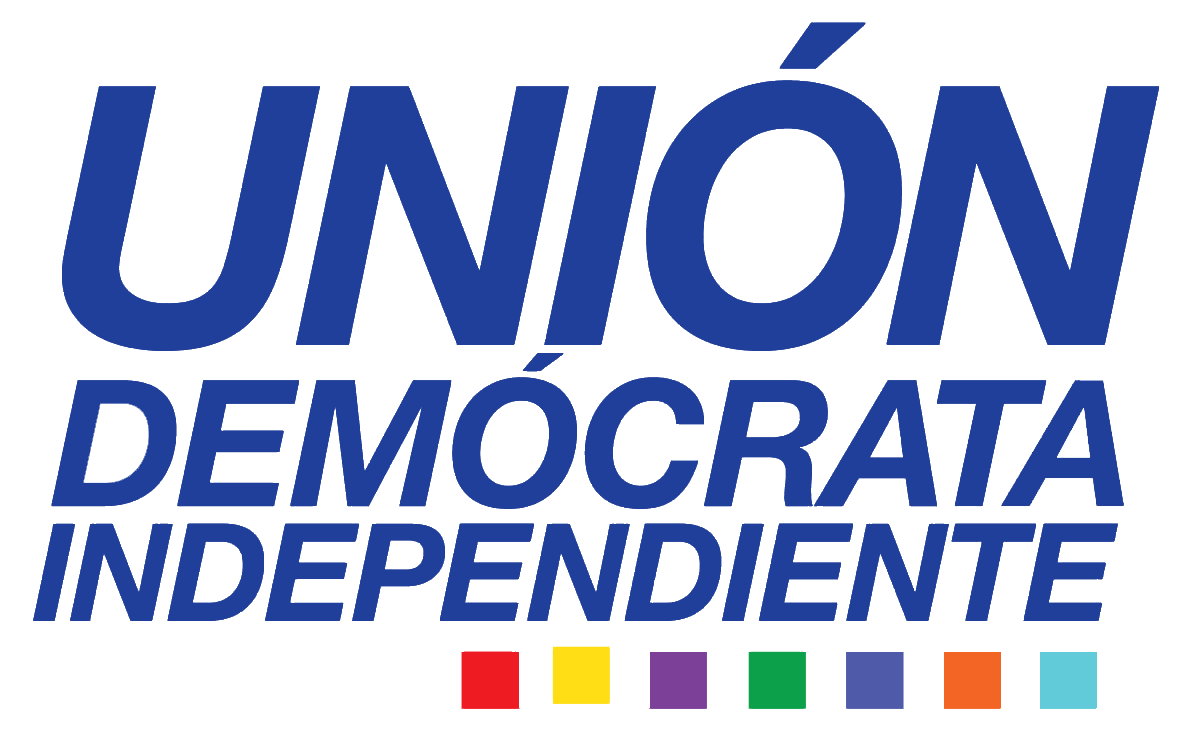
2016–2017

== See also ==
- Christian democracy
- Neoliberalism
- Pinochetism (factions)
