= Alejandro Viniegra =

Brazilian footballer (born 2002)

Personal information
- Full name: Alejandro Santana Viniegra
- Birth name: Alejandro Santana Viniegra (Note: This name uses Portuguese naming customs: the first or maternal family name is Santana and the second or paternal family name is Viniegra.)
- Date of birth: 13 February 2002 (age 24)
- Place of birth: Ribeirão Preto, São Paulo, Brazil
- Height: 1.71 m (5 ft 7 in)
- Position: Midfielder

Team information
- Current team: Maguary

Youth career
- Cruzeiro

Senior career*
Years	Team	Apps	(Gls)
2018–2020	Cruzeiro	1	(0)
2021	North Texas	6	(1)
2022–2024	Red Bull Brasil	29	(9)
2023	→ Ituano (loan)	9	(0)
2024	→ CRB (loan)	0	(0)
2024–2025	Santa Clara	0	(0)
2025	Tlaxcala	5	(1)
2026–	Maguary	0	(0)

International career
2017	Brazil U16	3	(1)
- * Club domestic league appearances and goals as of 13 May 2023

Alejandro Santana Viniegra (born 13 February 2002) is a Brazilian professional footballer who plays as a midfielder for Série D and Campeonato Pernambucano club Maguary.

== Club career ==
Viniegra made his professional debut with Cruzeiro on 12 February 2018 playing the last minute against Bahia ending in a tie.

== International career ==
In October 2020, Viniegra was called up to the Mexico national under-20 team training camp by Raúl Chabrand, for which he had done virtual training sessions three months before.

== Personal life ==
Born in Brazil to a Mexican father and a Brazilian mother, he holds dual Brazilian and Mexican citizenship.
