= Inverlink case =

The Inverlink case was a business and political bribery scandal in Chile in the early 2000s related to the private financial group Inverlink. It resulted in the sacking of the secretary and resignation of the chairman of the Central Bank of Chile and discovery of bribery by Inverlink of Chilian government departments that resulted in significant losses to the Chilian government and led to the failure of Interlink.

== History ==
Inverlink was a large Chilian financial company that was one of the most aggressive financial groups in Chile at the beginning of the 2000s. The group was engaged in pension fund administration, general insurance, private health care insurance, mutual funds and stocks, and leasing. Inverlink's firms included Inverlink Corredores de Bolsa, Inverlink Administradora General de Fondos, Inverlink Leasefactors, Inverlink Hipotecaria, Inverlink Consultores, Inverlink Asset Management and Inverlink USA. The holding also owned 75.5% of private pension fund manager AFP Magister and owns healthcare insurer Vida Plena.

In 2003 Pamela Andrada, the secretary of Central Bank of Chile chairman Carlos Massad, was sacked and put under investigation after she was surprised sending e-mails containing confidential insider information from Massad's computer to Inverlink's ex-CEO Enzo Bertinelli.

During the probe, it was discovered that Inverlink had also been bribing an employee at CORFO, the state economic-development agency, to "lend" it certificates of deposit as collateral for short-term operations in which it cashed in on its inside information. To raise funds to cover withdrawals, it began selling these certificates. Over US$100,000,000 were sold to mutual funds and other local institutions before Corfo discovered the theft.

The Inverlink scandal rocked the local financial establishment in 2003 and led to the resignations of central bank chairman Carlos Massad and securities regulator Alvaro Clarke.

In 2013 the Supreme Court of Chile determined the restitution of CLP$500,000,000 (approximately US$850,000) from the municipal council of La Pintana to CORFO. CORFO expected to obtain CLP$50,000,000,000 from 26 similar claims.
