= Tomás Hirsch =

Chilean politician and businessman

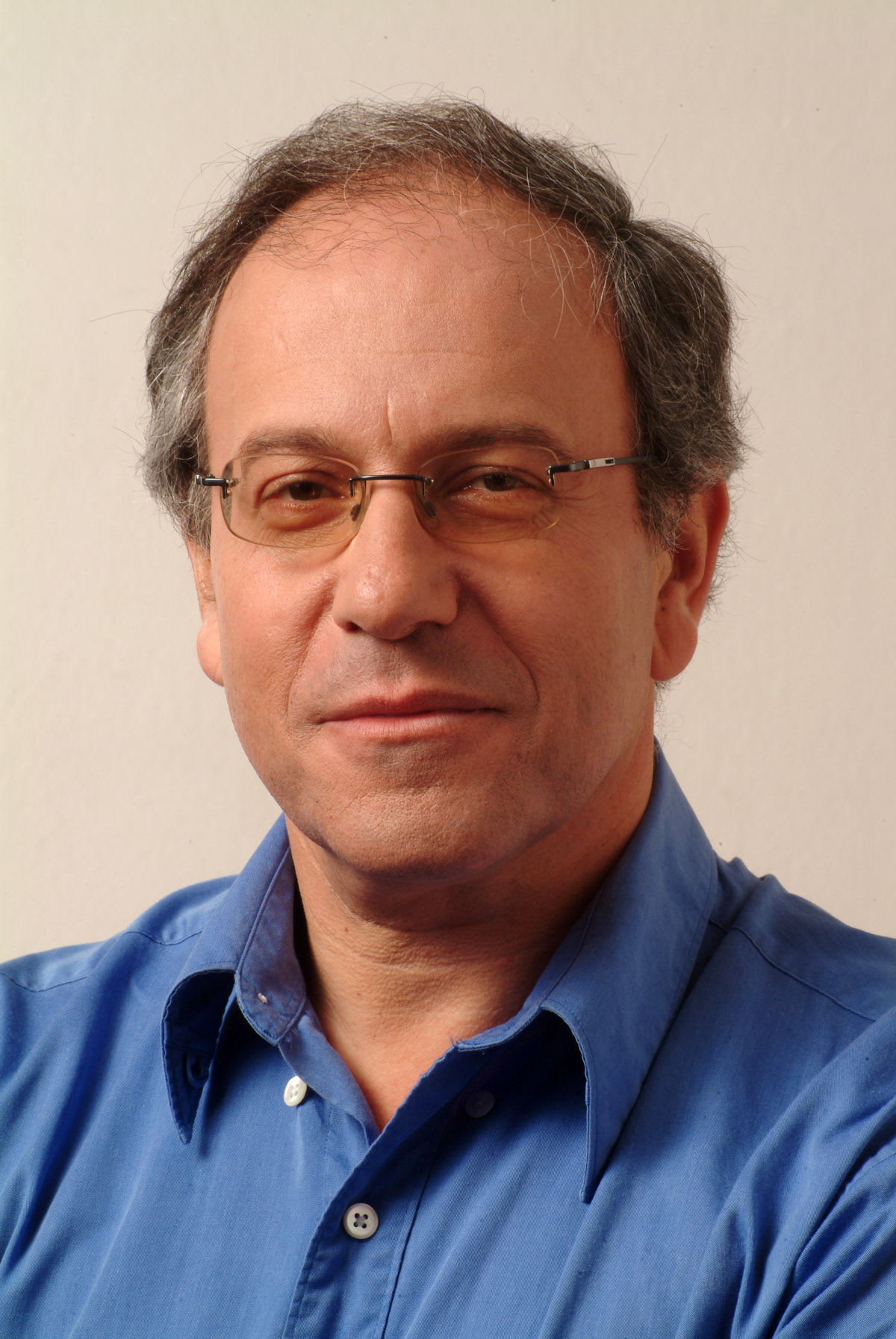
- Born: 19 July 1956 (age 70); Santiago, Chile

Tomás René Hirsch Goldschmidt (born 19 July 1956) is a leftist Chilean politician and businessman. He was the Together We Can Do More pact candidate for the 2005 Chilean presidential election, winning 5.4% of the vote.

== Biography ==
Hirsch was born in Santiago, Chile, to Jewish-German parents. His mother, Lysa Goldschmidt, arrived in Chile before World War II, while his father, Jorge Hirsch, arrived in the country escaping from German Nazi concentration camps.

During his youth, Hirsch became interested in Silo, an Argentinian writer and leader of a movement that inspired the founders of the Humanist Party.

In 1974 Hirsch began studying Industrial Civil Engineering at the University of Chile, but dropped out in 1978. Later he began working in his brother's photo company.

Hirsch is married to Juanita Vergara and has two children.

== Political life ==
In 1983 Hirsch helped found the Humanist Party, the first political party legalized (1987) under the government of Augusto Pinochet, and was president of the party from 1994 until 1999. He was also one of the founders of the Coalition of Parties for Democracy (CPD) and served as Chile's ambassador to New Zealand between 1990 and 1992, under the democratic government of Patricio Aylwin. In January 1993, the Humanist Party withdrew from the CPD.

Hirsch unsuccessfully ran for a seat in the lower house of Congress in 1997 and for President in 1999, representing the Humanists.

Hirsch was a leading spokesperson for the victims of the Pinochet regime - when Pinochet was under house arrest in London. He would often appear on international news cables demanding that Pinochet be sent to Spain and be put on trial for crimes against humanity. He criticized the government of Ricardo Lagos for pushing for Pinochet's release from detention claiming that Pinochet would never stand trial in Chile where he was protected by the Chilean Army and the Chilean political establishment. Hirsch has also been a major critic of the course the Coalition of Parties for Democracy has taken and was cynical of the euphoria created by the election of the socialist president Michelle Bachelet claiming that her government meant a continuation of the same for most Chileans.

Hirsch has a highly revolutionary conception of Chilean society and his party calls for systemic changes to the economy to create a more egalitarian, truly socialistic and democratic society for all Chileans. He is also a supporter of the cause of the natives of Chile – the Mapuches. Some of his views are close to those of the Communist Party of Chile (with which his party formed an electoral front in the coalition Juntos Podemos Más (English: Together we can do more) in the Chilean presidential elections of 2005. Hirsch has been arrested on a number of occasions by the Chilean police for taking part in demonstrations in support of political causes.

== Personal life ==
Hirsch is Jewish.
