= Juntos Podemos Más =

- Leader: Tomás Hirsch
- Founded: December 2003
- Headquarters: Santiago de Chile
- Ideology: Socialism; Humanism; Communism
- Political position: Left-wing
- Chamber of Deputies: 3 / 120
- Senate: 0 / 38
- Local government: 7 / 345

Website
- http://www.juntospodemos.cl/ (archive)

Juntos Podemos Más por Chile (Spanish literal: Together we can do more for Chile, Podemos is an acronym of Poder Democrático Social, Spanish for Social Democratic Power) was a political coalition created in 2003, consisting of the Communist Party of Chile, the Humanist Party, the Christian Left Party of Chile, and several other smaller left-wing organizations.

The Coalition presented at first five candidates (including the sociologist Tomás Moulián for the Communist Party) for the 2005 presidential election, but then finally agreed on the Humanist Party candidate, Tomás Hirsch. He obtained 5.4% of the vote (375,048 votes). The Coalition divided itself during the runoff vote, some conditionally voting for left-of-center candidate Michelle Bachelet and others proposing blank votes.

In the 2005 parliamentary election, the pact obtained 7.38% of the vote in the lower chamber election, and 5.98% in the Senate election, but did not win seats in either chamber. Members of the coalition blame this upon the binomial system, which privileges the two largest coalitions: Concertación and the Alliance for Chile.

For the 2009 parliamentary election, the coalition joined the Concertación list and won three seats in the lower chamber, all from the Communist Party. At the concurrent presidential election, Juntos Podemos supported the candidacy of former Socialist Party member Jorge Arrate as President, who won 6.2% of the vote. The Humanist Party left the coalition and supported independent candidate Marco Enríquez-Ominami.

== Composition ==
The coalition was made up of more than 50 parties and organisations, including the Communist Party (PCCh), the Humanist Party (PH) (until 2009), Izquierda Cristiana (Christian Left), Chilean Communist Party (Proletarian Action) (PCAP), MIR, the MPMR (Movimiento Patriótico Manuel Rodríguez), the Bloque por el Socialismo (BS) — which itself gathers three parties: Izquierda Socialista (Socialist Left), the Movimiento Por el Socialismo (MPS) and the Partido Alternativa Socialista (PAS) — Identidad Rodriguista (IR), Movimiento Fuerza Ciudadana (FC), Cambio Democrático, Partido Radical de Chile (PRCh), Revolución Democratizadora (RD), Generación 80 (G-80), Partido de los Trabajadores (PT) and the Juventudes Comunistas de Chile.
