= Juan Carlos Latorre =

Chilean politician (born 1949)

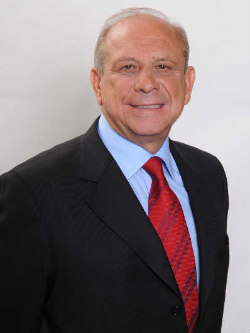
- Official portrait, 2010

Member of the Chamber of Deputies
- In office 11 March 2006 – 11 March 2014
- In office 11 March 1990 – 11 March 1998

President of the Christian Democratic Party
- In office 2008–2010
- Preceded by: Jorge Burgos

Personal details
- Born: 25 March 1949 (age 77) Santiago, Chile
- Party: Christian Democratic Party
- Education: University of Chile; University of Karlsruhe

Juan Carlos Latorre Carmona (born 25 March 1949) is a Chilean politician who served as member of the Chamber of Deputies, representing the former District 35 of the O'Higgins Region.

== Early life and family ==
He was born on 25 March 1949, the son of Carlos Latorre Offermanns and Teresa Carmona.

He was married to Ximena Rincón, and they are the parents of Valentina, Juan Carlos, and Juan Pablo. Previously, he was married to Rosa Djana D'ottone Morales, with whom he moved to Germany during the military regime; they had three children: Carlos, Rodrigo, and Paulina.

== Professional career ==
He completed his secondary education at the Deutsche Schule Santiago, graduating in 1965. He pursued higher education at the Faculty of Physical and Mathematical Sciences of the University of Chile, where he qualified as a Civil Engineer. He later obtained a Master’s degree in Regional Planning and Development from the University of Karlsruhe in the Federal Republic of Germany.

Professionally, between 1983 and 1987, he served as president of the Metropolitan Council of the Colegio de Ingenieros de Chile. He was an honorary member of the National Council of the Asamblea de la Civilidad, director of the Instituto Profesional de Santiago, and executive secretary of the Fundación para el Desarrollo y la Cultura Popular (DECUP).

In 1987, during the visit of Pope John Paul II to Chile, he was appointed head of the Papal Guard by the Catholic Church. The following year, he was one of the organizers of the Cruzada por la Participación Ciudadana.

From 1997 onward, he served as an academic at the University of Chile, as well as project manager and consultant for the Economic Commission for Latin America and the Caribbean (ECLAC) and the United Nations Development Programme (UNDP).

== Political career ==
During his university years, he assumed political responsibilities, serving as president of the Civil Engineering Student Center at his university. He later became a leader within the Federation of Students of the University of Chile (FECH), president of the Christian Democratic University Movement, and vice president of the Youth of the Christian Democratic Party. The following year and until 1990, he was elected president of the Front of Professionals and Technicians and national counselor of his party.

In 1998, during the administration of President Eduardo Frei Ruiz-Tagle, he was appointed Undersecretary of Public Works. In 2000, under President Ricardo Lagos, he continued in that position. In 2004, he became president of Sistemas Inteligentes de Transporte ITS Chile.

On 13 December 2008, the National Board of his party appointed him president of the Christian Democratic Party. In August 2010, he was elected vice president of the Christian Democrat Organization of America (ODCA).

In the parliamentary elections of November 2013, he ran as a candidate for senator for Constituency No. 9, O'Higgins Region, representing the Christian Democratic Party (Chile), but was not elected.
