= Coalition for Change (Chile) =

Chilean political coalition

Coalition for Change Coalición por el Cambio
- Leader: Sebastián Piñera
- Founded: May 6, 2009
- Dissolved: 2013
- Preceded by: Alliance
- Succeeded by: Coalición
- Headquarters: Santiago de Chile
- Ideology: Liberal conservatism
- Political position: Center-right
- International affiliation: International Democrat Union

Website
- rn.cl and udi.cl

The Coalition for Change was a presidential and parliamentary electoral coalition that groups the supporters of Sebastián Piñera for the 2009-10 Chilean presidential election. Its predecessor was the Alliance for Chile. The constituent parties are the Independent Democratic Union, National Renewal, ChileFirst, the movements Grand North, and Christian Humanism.

This coalition speech aspired to leave behind divisions that have polarized Chilean society, and his objective was to work together for the future of Chile by creating a democracy representative of the diverse creeds with respect, tolerance and friendship.

== History ==
After his separation from the Coalition of Parties for Democracy (Concertación de Partidos por la Democracia) and having founded the political movement ChileFirst, Senator Fernando Flores integrated the independent platform next to Carlos Cantero, who renounced from National Renewal to found the Movement Grand North; Carlos Bianchi; and Adolfo Zaldívar, ex Christian-democrat with close ties to the Regionalist Party of the Independents (Partido Regionalista de los Independientes).

This group of senators was key in proposing the coalition of right-wing Alliance for Chile, as in the destitution of the Minister Yasna Provoste for embezzlement and in the naming of Jovino Novoa (UDI) as the president of the Chilean Senate.

After having joined the list "Clean Chile. Happy Vote" (Chile Limpio. Vote Feliz, formerly Por Un Chile Limpio), a separation was generated between the founding members of ChileFirst in respect to the position the party would take before the presidential and parliamentary elections of 2009. Meanwhile, Jorge Schaulsohn and Fernando Flores supported the candidate of the Alliance for Chile Sebastián Piñera, Esteban Valenzuela, also a member of parliament, rejected the union with the center-right and renounced ChileFirst in order to support Marco Enríquez-Ominami. The support for Sebastián Piñera by the part of ChilePrimero was made official on May 6, 2009, the same day the Coalition for Change itself became official, joining the Alliance for Chile, ChileFirst and other minor political movements.

For the 2009-2010 presidential elections, the candidate for the Coalition for Change, Sebastián Piñera, won the first round with more than 44% of the votes. During the run-off election, Sebastián Piñera won with 51.61% of the Chilean vote, with which he succeeded in retaining the presidency for the period of 2010–2014. Piñera took the presidential oath on March 11, 2010.

In 2013, the coalition was composed only of the National Renewal and the Independent Democratic Union. That same year, regained its old name "Alliance" to participate in the presidential primaries.

== Leaders ==
- Francisco Alaniz, Corparaucanía
- Cristina Bitar, Humanismo Cristiano
- Roberto Mayorga, Humanismo Cristiano
- Juan Antonio Coloma, Unión Demócrata Independiente
- Carlos Larraín, Renovación Nacional
- Carlos Cantero, Norte Grande
- Fernando Flores, ChilePrimero
- Sebastián Piñera, President of Chile

== See also ==
- Alliance (Chile)
