= Pablo Lorenzini =

Chilean politician (1949–2025)

The Honourable Pablo Lorenzini
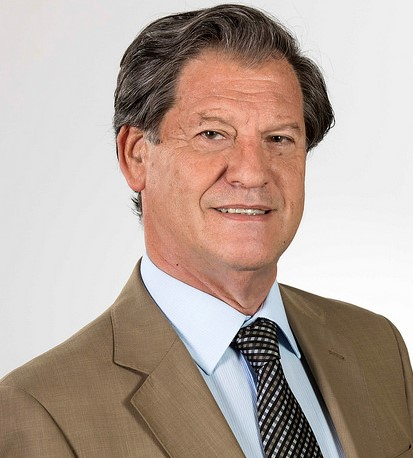

Member of the Chamber of Deputies
- In office 11 March 1998 – 11 March 2022

President of the Chamber of Deputies of Chile
- In office 16 March 2004 – 6 January 2005
- Preceded by: Isabel Allende Bussi
- Succeeded by: Gabriel Ascencio

Personal details
- Born: 25 October 1949 Molina, Chile
- Died: 29 June 2025 (aged 75)
- Party: Independent; Christian Democratic Party (1997–2020)
- Education: University of Chile
- Occupation: Politician, economist

Pablo Lorenzini Basso (25 October 1949 – 29 June 2025) was a Chilean politician who served as a member of the Chamber of Deputies, representing District 38 of the Maule Region and as President of the Chamber of Deputies. He died on 29 June 2025, at the age of 75.
