= Roberto León =

Chilean politician

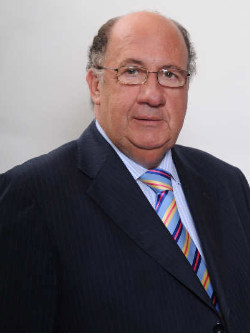

Member of the Chamber of Deputies
- In office 11 March 2006 – 11 March 2018
- Preceded by: Boris Tapia
- Succeeded by: District dissolved
- Constituency: 36th District
- In office 11 March 1994 – 11 March 2002
- Preceded by: Gustavo Ramírez Vergara
- Succeeded by: Boris Tapia

Personal details
- Born: 11 February 1951 (age 75) Santiago, Chile
- Party: Christian Democratic Party (DC)
- Children: Four
- Education: University of Chile (LL.B)
- Occupation: Politician
- Profession: Lawyer

Roberto Eduardo León Ramírez (born 11 February 1951) is a Chilean lawyer and Christian Democratic politician.

He served as deputy of the Republic, for district No. 36, which included the communes of Curicó, Vichuquén, Licantén, Hualañé, and Teno. He was up for reelection in November 2017 for the new district 17 of the Maule Region, an objective that he did not meet and ended his term on March 10, 2018.

On 6 September 2017, a national scandal broke out when various media outlets accused nearly 40 parliamentarians, including Roberto León, of having accepted advisory reports with paragraphs copied verbatim from the internet or books, without crediting the writer of the original source. The five reports from Roberto León that record plagiarism were received by the legislator in 2014, and paid $10.9 million.

== Biography ==
León was born on 11 February 1951 in Santiago, Chile. He is the son of Roberto León Alquinta and Silvia Luisa Ramírez Guerra. He is married to María de la Paz Araya García and is the father of four children.

He completed his primary and secondary education at Colegio San Marcos in Arica and at Instituto Luis Campino in Santiago. In 1971, he began studying law at the University of Chile in Valparaíso and later continued his studies in Santiago, qualifying as a lawyer on 16 November 1981.

Professionally, he worked as a lawyer and was engaged in agricultural activities. He was a shareholder in cable television companies in Curicó, a partner in industrial security firms, and in the agricultural companies Licantén and Vichuquén.

He began his political activity in 1970 as a leader of the Christian Democratic Youth (JDC) in Arica. In 1971, he served as delegate of the Student Federation of the University of Chile (FECH) in Valparaíso and, in 1972, as delegate of the Student Federation of the Faculty of Law of the same university in Santiago.

For four years, he was a leader of the Democratic Alliance in Licantén. Between 1987 and 1989, he served as communal vice president of the Christian Democratic Party, later becoming communal president. In 1991, 1993 and 1995, he was elected delegate to his party’s National Board representing the Province of Curicó.

== Parliamentary career ==
In December 1993, he was elected deputy for the Christian Democratic Party (DC) for the Seventh Region of Maule, District No. 36 (1994–1998), beginning a parliamentary career that extended uninterruptedly until 2018. He was re-elected in 1997, 2005, 2009 and 2013, completing five consecutive terms in the Chamber of Deputies representing the same district.

Throughout his legislative service (1994–2018), he served on various standing committees, including Agriculture; Labor and Social Security (which he chaired); Economy; Science and Technology; Foreign Affairs; Citizen Security and Drugs; National Defense (which he chaired from March 2014); Natural Resources and Environment; and Housing and Urban Development (which he presided over in 2015). He also participated in investigative and special commissions, and was First Vice President of the Chamber between March 2000 and April 2001.

In the field of interparliamentary relations, he presided over the Chilean Group to the Inter-Parliamentary Union in 2007 and headed the Chilean-Chinese Interparliamentary Group, participating in official missions and international forums of the Inter-Parliamentary Union and the United Nations.
