= District 2 (Chamber of Deputies of Chile) =

Electoral district of the Chamber of Deputies of Chile

- Distrito 2
- Electoral District for the Chamber of Deputies
- Location of District 2 within Chile
- Region: Tarapacá
- Population: 330,558 (2017)
- Electorate: 260,147 (2021)
- Area: 42,289 km^{2} (2020)

Current Electoral District
- Created: 2017
- Seats: 3 (2017–present)
- Deputies: List: Danisa Astudillo (PS); Matías Ramírez (PC); Renzo Trisotti (Ind)

District 2 (Spanish: Distrito 2) is one of the 28 multi-member electoral districts of the Chamber of Deputies, the lower house of the National Congress, the national legislature of Chile. The district was created by the 2015 electoral reform and came into being at the following general election in 2017. It is conterminous with the region of Tarapacá. The district currently elects three of the 155 members of the Chamber of Deputies using the open party-list proportional representation electoral system. At the 2021 general election the district had 260,147 registered electors.

== Electoral system ==
District 2 currently elects three of the 155 members of the Chamber of Deputies using the open party-list proportional representation electoral system. Parties may form electoral pacts with each other to pool their votes and increase their chances of winning seats. However, the number of candidates nominated by an electoral pact may not exceed the maximum number of candidates that a single party may nominate. Seats are allocated using the D'Hondt method.

== Election results ==
=== Summary ===
| Election | Apruebo Dignidad AD / FA | | | Dignidad Ahora DA | | | New Social Pact NPS / NM | | | Democratic Convergence CD | | | Chile Vamos Podemos / Vamos | | | Party of the People PDG | | | Christian Social Front FSC | | |
| Election | Votes | % | Seats | Votes | % | Seats | Votes | % | Seats | Votes | % | Seats | Votes | % | Seats | Votes | % | Seats | Votes | % | Seats |
|---|---|---|---|---|---|---|---|---|---|---|---|---|---|---|---|---|---|---|---|---|---|
| 2021 | 26,534 | 26.50% | 1 | 1,894 | 1.89% | 0 | 15,929 | 15.91% | 1 | | | | 23,750 | 23.72% | 1 | 15,723 | 15.70% | 0 | 14,834 | 14.82% | 0 |
| 2017 | 11,652 | 12.89% | 0 | | | | 27,770 | 30.72% | 1 | 4,330 | 4.79% | 0 | 38,960 | 43.09% | 2 | | | | | | |

=== Detailed ===
==== 2021 ====
Results of the 2021 general election held on 21 November 2021:

| Party | | Pact | Party | | | | | | | | | | Pact | | |
| Party | | Pact | Votes per commune | | | | | | | Total votes | % | Seats | Votes | % | Seats |
| Party | | Pact | Alto Hos- picio | Cam- iña | Col- chane | Huara | Iqui- que | Pica | Pozo Al- monte | Total votes | % | Seats | Votes | % | Seats |
|---|---|---|---|---|---|---|---|---|---|---|---|---|---|---|---|
| Communist Party of Chile | PC | Apruebo Dignidad | 1,237 | 11 | 8 | 70 | 8,165 | 170 | 236 | 9,897 | 9.88% | 1 | 26,534 | 26.50% | 1 |
| Social Green Regionalist Federation | FREVS | Apruebo Dignidad | 1,653 | 58 | 49 | 97 | 5,218 | 226 | 278 | 7,579 | 7.57% | 0 | 26,534 | 26.50% | 1 |
| Democratic Revolution | RD | Apruebo Dignidad | 1,065 | 21 | 13 | 62 | 3,667 | 98 | 186 | 5,112 | 5.11% | 0 | 26,534 | 26.50% | 1 |
| Comunes | COM | Apruebo Dignidad | 819 | 61 | 9 | 144 | 2,726 | 61 | 126 | 3,946 | 3.94% | 0 | 26,534 | 26.50% | 1 |
| Independent Democratic Union | UDI | Chile Podemos + | 1,613 | 149 | 104 | 241 | 8,161 | 438 | 394 | 11,100 | 11.09% | 1 | 23,750 | 23.72% | 1 |
| National Renewal | RN | Chile Podemos + | 3,434 | 114 | 159 | 151 | 5,651 | 175 | 323 | 10,007 | 9.99% | 0 | 23,750 | 23.72% | 1 |
| Evópoli | EVO | Chile Podemos + | 238 | 11 | 3 | 22 | 1,020 | 32 | 121 | 1,447 | 1.45% | 0 | 23,750 | 23.72% | 1 |
| Democratic Independent Regionalist Party | PRI | Chile Podemos + | 263 | 10 | 10 | 29 | 769 | 31 | 84 | 1,196 | 1.19% | 0 | 23,750 | 23.72% | 1 |
| Socialist Party of Chile | PS | New Social Pact | 1,662 | 35 | 22 | 132 | 5,004 | 224 | 503 | 7,582 | 7.57% | 1 | 15,929 | 15.91% | 1 |
| Party for Democracy | PPD | New Social Pact | 930 | 18 | 16 | 90 | 5,408 | 97 | 165 | 6,724 | 6.72% | 0 | 15,929 | 15.91% | 1 |
| Christian Democratic Party | PDC | New Social Pact | 444 | 9 | 7 | 16 | 776 | 68 | 303 | 1,623 | 1.62% | 0 | 15,929 | 15.91% | 1 |
| Party of the People | PDG | | 5,304 | 146 | 207 | 255 | 8,466 | 317 | 1,028 | 15,723 | 15.70% | 0 | 15,723 | 15.70% | 0 |
| Republican Party | REP | Christian Social Front | 2,291 | 99 | 177 | 152 | 11,307 | 271 | 537 | 14,834 | 14.82% | 0 | 14,834 | 14.82% | 0 |
| Humanist Party | PH | Dignidad Ahora | 486 | 20 | 16 | 31 | 1,152 | 53 | 136 | 1,894 | 1.89% | 0 | 1,894 | 1.89% | 0 |
| New Time | NT | | 475 | 9 | 11 | 22 | 845 | 27 | 74 | 1,463 | 1.46% | 0 | 1,463 | 1.46% | 0 |
| Valid votes | | | 21,914 | 771 | 811 | 1,514 | 68,335 | 2,288 | 4,494 | 100,127 | 100.00% | 3 | 100,127 | 100.00% | 3 |
| Blank votes | | | 1,112 | 80 | 81 | 131 | 2,840 | 178 | 343 | 4,765 | 4.32% | | | | |
| Rejected votes – other | | | 1,531 | 32 | 26 | 77 | 3,354 | 100 | 319 | 5,439 | 4.93% | | | | |
| Total polled | | | 24,557 | 883 | 918 | 1,722 | 74,529 | 2,566 | 5,156 | 110,331 | 42.41% | | | | |
| Registered electors | | | 60,343 | 2,639 | 3,217 | 9,045 | 167,349 | 5,663 | 11,891 | 260,147 | | | | | |
| Turnout | | | 40.70% | 33.46% | 28.54% | 19.04% | 44.54% | 45.31% | 43.36% | 42.41% | | | | | |

The following candidates were elected: Danisa Astudillo (PS), 7,582 votes; Matías Ramírez (PC), 9,897 votes; and Renzo Trisotti (UDI), 11,100 votes.

==== 2017 ====
Results of the 2017 general election held on 19 November 2017:

| Party | | Pact | Party | | | | | | | | | | Pact | | |
| Party | | Pact | Votes per commune | | | | | | | Total votes | % | Seats | Votes | % | Seats |
| Party | | Pact | Alto Hos- picio | Cam- iña | Col- chane | Huara | Iqui- que | Pica | Pozo Al- monte | Total votes | % | Seats | Votes | % | Seats |
|---|---|---|---|---|---|---|---|---|---|---|---|---|---|---|---|
| Independent Democratic Union | UDI | Chile Vamos | 2,408 | 170 | 109 | 358 | 15,738 | 663 | 638 | 20,084 | 22.22% | 1 | 38,960 | 43.09% | 2 |
| National Renewal | RN | Chile Vamos | 4,665 | 207 | 219 | 269 | 10,943 | 282 | 694 | 17,279 | 19.11% | 1 | 38,960 | 43.09% | 2 |
| Independent Regionalist Party | PRI | Chile Vamos | 206 | 9 | 2 | 6 | 591 | 15 | 75 | 904 | 1.00% | 0 | 38,960 | 43.09% | 2 |
| Evópoli | EVO | Chile Vamos | 172 | 7 | 4 | 10 | 446 | 33 | 21 | 693 | 0.77% | 0 | 38,960 | 43.09% | 2 |
| Communist Party of Chile | PC | Nueva Mayoría | 2,717 | 101 | 53 | 249 | 10,136 | 475 | 601 | 14,332 | 15.85% | 1 | 27,770 | 30.72% | 1 |
| Socialist Party of Chile | PS | Nueva Mayoría | 1,674 | 41 | 28 | 80 | 6,030 | 161 | 421 | 8,435 | 9.33% | 0 | 27,770 | 30.72% | 1 |
| Social Democrat Radical Party | PRSD | Nueva Mayoría | 841 | 19 | 32 | 55 | 1,979 | 43 | 220 | 3,189 | 3.53% | 0 | 27,770 | 30.72% | 1 |
| Party for Democracy | PPD | Nueva Mayoría | 371 | 19 | 7 | 54 | 1,286 | 13 | 64 | 1,814 | 2.01% | 0 | 27,770 | 30.72% | 1 |
| Liberal Party of Chile | PL | Broad Front | 734 | 8 | 12 | 47 | 3,799 | 132 | 242 | 4,974 | 5.50% | 0 | 11,652 | 12.89% | 0 |
| Equality Party | IGUAL | Broad Front | 490 | 7 | 12 | 17 | 2,762 | 31 | 72 | 3,391 | 3.75% | 0 | 11,652 | 12.89% | 0 |
| Humanist Party | PH | Broad Front | 389 | 10 | 7 | 13 | 1,921 | 24 | 54 | 2,418 | 2.67% | 0 | 11,652 | 12.89% | 0 |
| Citizen Power | PODER | Broad Front | 178 | 5 | 4 | 6 | 650 | 9 | 17 | 869 | 0.96% | 0 | 11,652 | 12.89% | 0 |
| Christian Democratic Party | PDC | Democratic Convergence | 747 | 34 | 33 | 139 | 2,881 | 209 | 287 | 4,330 | 4.79% | 0 | 4,330 | 4.79% | 0 |
| Freddy Marcos Araneda Barahona (Independent) | Ind | | 1,085 | 13 | 9 | 36 | 2,428 | 26 | 149 | 3,746 | 4.14% | 0 | 3,746 | 4.14% | 0 |
| Amplitude | AMP | Sumemos | 409 | 17 | 36 | 56 | 1,206 | 79 | 269 | 2,072 | 2.29% | 0 | 2,504 | 2.77% | 0 |
| Todos | TODOS | Sumemos | 131 | 3 | 2 | 5 | 257 | 11 | 23 | 432 | 0.48% | 0 | 2,504 | 2.77% | 0 |
| País | PAIS | All Over Chile | 283 | 21 | 12 | 32 | 981 | 39 | 76 | 1,444 | 1.60% | 0 | 1,444 | 1.60% | 0 |
| Valid votes | | | 17,500 | 691 | 581 | 1,432 | 64,034 | 2,245 | 3,923 | 90,406 | 100.00% | 3 | 90,406 | 100.00% | 3 |
| Blank votes | | | 672 | 55 | 47 | 73 | 1,988 | 97 | 269 | 3,201 | 3.33% | | | | |
| Rejected votes – other | | | 523 | 18 | 16 | 51 | 1,776 | 62 | 171 | 2,617 | 2.72% | | | | |
| Total polled | | | 18,695 | 764 | 644 | 1,556 | 67,798 | 2,404 | 4,363 | 96,224 | 39.54% | | | | |
| Registered electors | | | 51,451 | 2,820 | 3,379 | 9,046 | 160,432 | 5,000 | 11,215 | 243,343 | | | | | |
| Turnout | | | 36.34% | 27.09% | 19.06% | 17.20% | 42.26% | 48.08% | 38.90% | 39.54% | | | | | |

The following candidates were elected: Ramón Galleguillos (RN), 17,279 votes; Hugo Gutiérrez (PC), 14,332 votes; and Renzo Trisotti (UDI), 20,084 votes.
