= 2017 Chilean presidential primaries =

Presidential primaries of Chile Vamos and Broad Front, 2017
- 2 July 2017
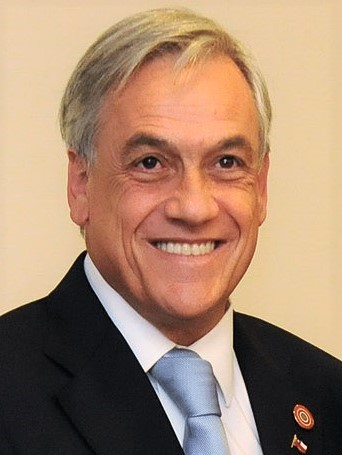

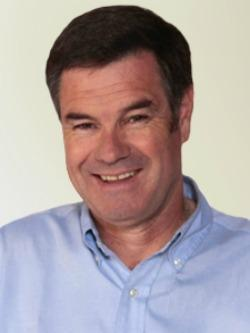

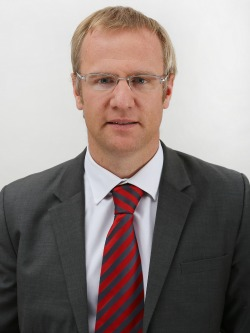

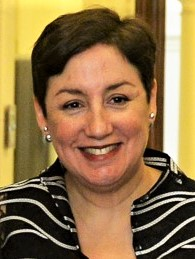

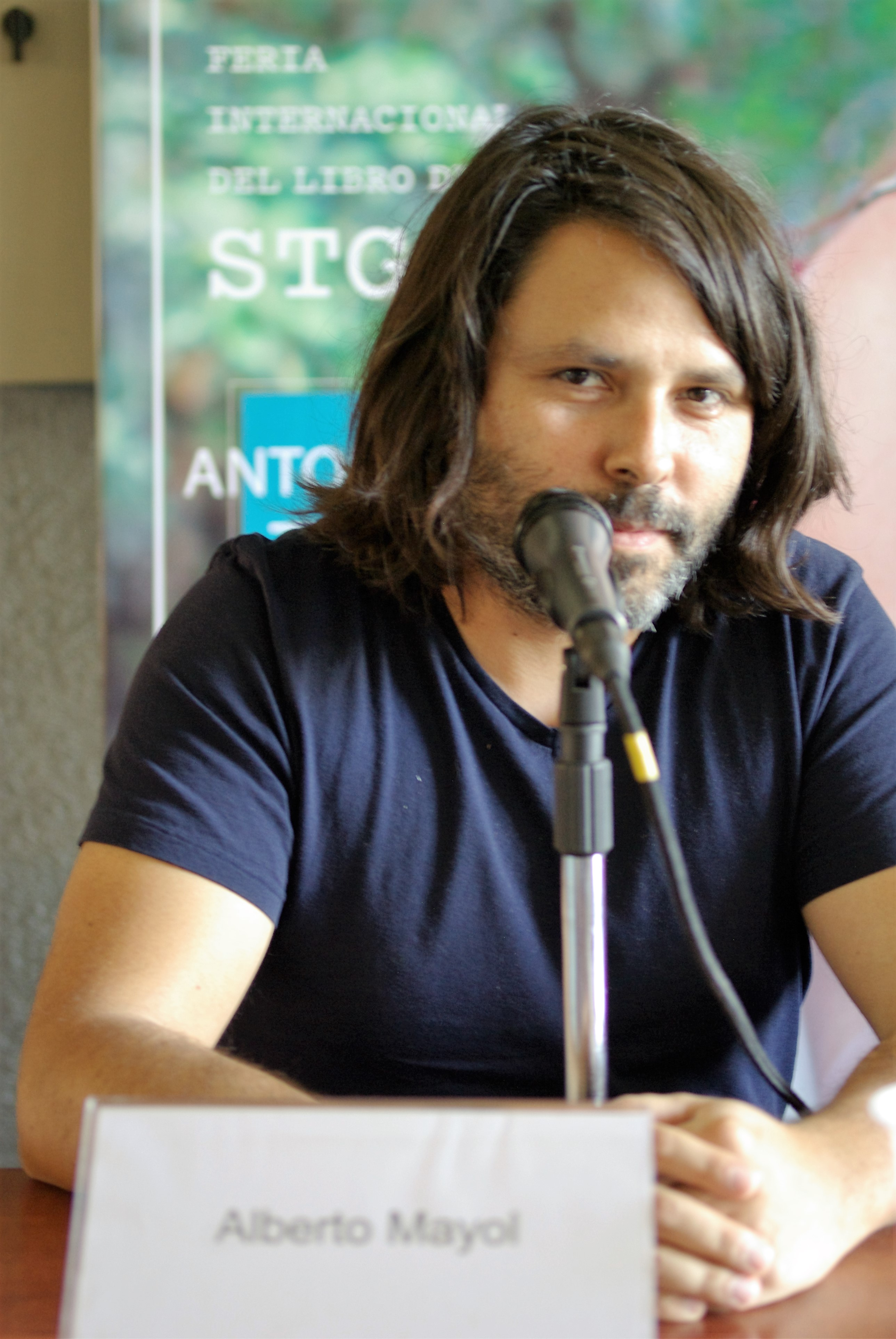
Candidate	Sebastián Piñera	Manuel José Ossandón	Felipe Kast
Party	Independent	Independent	Evópoli
Alliance	Chile Vamos	Chile Vamos	Chile Vamos
Popular vote	827,434	372,215	218,489
Percentage	58.35%	26.25%	15.41%
Candidate	Beatriz Sánchez	Alberto Mayol
Party	Independent	Independent
Alliance	Broad Front	Broad Front
Popular vote	221,416	106,300
Percentage	67.56%	32.44%

The Chilean presidential primaries of 2017 were held in Chile on Sunday 2 July 2017. It was the first election in the country's history in which Chileans were permitted to vote from abroad.

According to the law, primaries are voluntary, but its results are binding. Two political coalitions decided to participate: Former president Sebastián Piñera won the Chile Vamos primary with 58% of the vote, while radio and television journalist Beatriz Sánchez became the Broad Front nominee with nearly 68%.

The governing Nueva Mayoría coalition decided not to participate.

The presidential election was held on Sunday 19 November 2017.

== Chile Vamos primary ==
All three Chile Vamos candidates were registered before the Servel (election authority) on 2 May 2017. Former President Sebastián Piñera won the coalition's nomination with 56,86% of the vote.

=== Candidates ===
- Felipe Kast (Evópoli): The former minister was proclaimed as candidate on 6 November 2016 by his party, Evópoli.
- Manuel José Ossandón (Ind.): The senator for Santiago announced on 5 November 2016 his willingness to participate in a Chile Vamos primary.
- Sebastián Piñera (Ind.): The former president was proclaimed as candidate by the Independent Regionalist Party on 17 December 2016, by the Independent Democratic Union on 24 March 2017, and two days later by his former party, National Renewal. On 8 July 2017, Amplitude proclaimed him as its candidate.

=== Unsuccessful candidacies ===
- Francisco Chahuán (RN): Announced his candidacy to the presidency of the Republic on September 14, 2016. He declined his candidacy on March 6, 2017, declaring his support for Sebastián Piñera.
- Francisco de la Maza (UDI): He refused to compete for reelection to the mayor of Las Condes in the municipal elections of 2016, ceding the quota to Joaquín Lavín, in order to follow a presidential candidacy for 2017. However, in September 2016 declared that he had neither the spirit nor the ambition to be a presidential candidate.
- Alberto Espina (RN): Announced on 4 December 2013 his intention to run for the presidency of the Republic. With RN's proclamation to Piñera on March 25, his candidacy was virtually ruled out. Previously, he had given his support to the former President's nomination.

== Broad Front primary ==
In the Broad Front coalition of leftist parties, Beatriz Sánchez, a journalist with no political experience, became the coalition's nominee with nearly 68% of the vote.

=== Candidates ===
- Alberto Mayol (Ind.): The sociologist, author and television commentator announced on 2 March 2017 his intention to participate in a Broad Front primary. On 31 May 2017 it was reported that both the Equality Party and the Pirate Party had given him their backing. Other movements not part of the Broad Front also decided to give him their support, including Ukamau, the Christian Left (on 14 May 2017) and the Allendista Socialism.
- Beatriz Sánchez (Ind.): The journalist announced on 21 March 2017 during her own radio show that she was quitting her job to think about the possibility of running for president. On 31 March 2017 she gained the official support from both Democratic Revolution and Autonomist Movement. She launched her candidacy on 3 April 2017 at a rally near Plaza Baquedano in Santiago. On 16 April 2017 she was proclaimed as candidate by the Humanist Party, and on 23 April 2017 the Libertarian Left gave her its support. On 9 May 2017 she was proclaimed as candidate by the Poder party, and four days later by the Progressive Democratic Movement. On 14 May 2017 the Autonomous Left proclaimed her as their candidate. On 29 May 2017 the Liberal Party proclaimed her as their candidate, while on 6 June 2017, the Green Ecologist Party did the same.

=== Unsuccessful candidacies ===
- Alejandro Navarro
- Luis Mariano Rendón
- Carlos Ruiz

== Primary results ==
Note: Revised preliminary results.

Ballot number	Candidate	Party	Votes	%	Result
(A) Chile Vamos primary
1	Sebastián Piñera	Independent	827,434	58.35	Chile Vamos candidate
2	Felipe Kast	Political Evolution	218,489	15.41	
3	Manuel José Ossandón	Independent	372,215	26.25	
	Total valid votes		1,418,138	100.00	
(B) Broad Front primary
4	Beatriz Sánchez	Independent	221,416	67.56	Broad Front candidate
5	Alberto Mayol	Independent	106,300	32.44	
	Total valid votes		327,716	100.00	
	Total valid votes		1,745,854	96.35	
	Null votes		57,945	3.20	
	Blank votes		8,278	0.46	
	Total votes		1,812,077	100.00	
	Eligible voters		13,531,553	13.39% turnout	

Source: Servel.

== Nueva Mayoría's aborted primary ==
The Nueva Mayoría was expected to hold a primary election to select its candidate for president. The governing coalition includes the Christian Democratic, Radical Social Democratic, For Democracy, Socialist, MAS Region, Citizen Left and Communist parties.

Senator Alejandro Guillier was proclaimed as candidate by the Radical Social Democratic (PRSD), Socialist (PS) and Communist (PC) parties. However, on April 29, 2017, the Christian Democratic Party decided to break away from the Nueva Mayoría coalition and present their candidate, Senator Carolina Goic, directly to the first round.

According to Chilean law, Guillier will have to collect signatures to participate in the first round, even if he is supported by a political party, given his status as an independent politician.

=== Socialist Party candidate definition ===
On 19 January 2017, the Socialist Party of Chile agreed to maintain its decision to define the party's presidential candidacy via an extra-legal primary (called "citizen consultation") on April 28, in which party members and citizens who are not registered in any political party would be able to vote. The decision was ratified by the party's Central Committee on 21 January. The possible candidates were:

- Fernando Atria (PS): The constitutional lawyer and university professor declared his intention to compete in a Socialist Party primary on 25 September 2016.
- José Miguel Insulza (PS): The former minister and former Secretary General of the Organization of American States announced his intention to compete in a Socialist Party primary on 23 November 2016.
- Ricardo Lagos (PPD): The former President was proclaimed as candidate by the Party for Democracy on 14 January 2017.

However, on 1 April 2017 the Central Committee of the Socialist Party decided to call off the primary election and select the presidential candidate themselves. After this decision, both Insulza and Atria withdrew their candidacies.

On 10 April 2017 former President Ricardo Lagos announced he was pulling out of the presidential race.
