= Opinion polling for the 2017 Chilean general election =

Opinion polling was carried out prior to the 2017 Chilean general elections.

== President ==
=== Open-ended question ===
Question: "Who would you like to be the next president?" Full sample is shown, unless specified.

Polling firm	Field dates	MEO	Goic	Guillier	F Kast	JA Kast	Lagos	Mayol	Ossandón	Parisi	Piñera	Sánchez	Others	DK/NR	Error
Adimark	November 7–28, 2016	1%	1%	21%	1%		7%		4%		24%		10%	31%	3%
Criteria Research	November 28-December 7, 2016	2%		25%	0%	0%	4%		5%	2%	27%		35%		3.4%
CEP	November 25-December 23, 2016	1%		14%			5%		2%		20%		10%	49%	3%
CERC-Mori	December 7–15, 2016			14%			6%		3%		19%		57%		3%
Adimark	December 2–28, 2016	2%		26%			5%		4%		29%		11%	23%	3%
Criteria Research	December 27, 2016 – January 4, 2017	2%		27%		1%	2%		5%	2%	32%		22%	7%	3.4%
Adimark	January 6–25, 2017	1%	1%	28%		1%	5%		2%		27%		10%	25%	3%
Criteria Research	January 25-February 2, 2017	1%		28%			3%		5%	3%	28%		32%		3.4%
Adimark	February 2–28, 2017	1%	1%	25%	1%	1%	4%		2%	1%	29%		10%	25%	3%
Cadem	March 1–3, 2017	1%		17%			3%		3%	2%	25%		6%	43%	3.7%
Criteria Research	March 1–10, 2017	3%		25%			7%		4%	5%	23%		33%		3.4%
Cadem	March 8–10, 2017	1%	1%	17%	1%		2%		4%	2%	26%		6%	40%	3.7%
Adimark	March 3–28, 2017	2%	2%	23%	1%		3%		4%		27%	2%	7%	29%	3%
Cadem	March 15–17, 2017	1%	2%	16%	1%		2%	1%	3%	1%	24%		7%	42%	3.7%
Cadem	March 22–24, 2017	1%	3%	15%	1%		3%		3%	1%	25%	2%	4%	42%	3.6%
Cadem	March 29–31, 2017	1%	2%	16%	1%		4%		3%	1%	24%	4%	4%	40%	3.6%
CERC-Mori	March 28-April 10, 2017	2%		14%			4%		2%		24%	3%	2%	49%	3%
Cadem	April 5–7, 2017	2%	1%	15%			3%		3%	2%	26%	6%	3%	39%	3.6%
Criteria Research	April 4–11, 2017	2%		18%			2%		4%	6%	33%	11%	24%		3.4%
Cadem	April 12–13, 2017	1%	2%	17%			1%		3%	2%	24%	6%	3%	41%	3.6%
Adimark	April 3–25, 2017		2%	19%	1%		3%		2%	3%	24%	11%	6%	29%	3%
Cadem	April 20–21, 2017		2%	17%	1%				4%	1%	23%	6%	4%	42%	3.7%
Cadem	April 26–28, 2017		2%	16%	1%	1%			4%	3%	22%	6%	4%	41%	3.6%
Cadem	May 3–5, 2017	1%	3%	15%	1%				4%	2%	24%	8%	4%	38%	3.6%
Criteria Research	May 2–12, 2017			18%					9%	5%	30%	17%	15%	7%	3.4%
CEP	April 26-May 22, 2017	1.5%	2.1%	12.8%			1.5%		5.4%		23.7%	4.8%	7%	42%	3%
Cadem	May 10–12, 2017	1%	3%	15%	1%				4%	1%	24%	9%	3%	39%	3.7%
Adimark	May 3–29, 2017	2%	3%	21%	1%		1%		4%	1%	25%	11%	5%	26%	3%
Cadem	May 17–19, 2017	1%	3%	14%	1%	1%			4%	2%	26%	8%	4%	36%	3.6%
Cadem	May 24–26, 2017	1%	3%	13%				1%	4%	2%	24%	9%	4%	39%	3.7%
Cadem	June 1–2, 2017	1%	2%	14%	1%				4%	1%	24%	10%	5%	38%	3.7%
Criteria Research	June 1–11, 2017	2%	6%	17%					6%		29%	12%	19%	10%	3.4%
Cadem	June 7–9, 2017		1%	13%	1%			1%	5%		25%	9%	5%	40%	3.6%
Adimark	June 2–27, 2017	1%	2%	15%	3%	1%		3%	4%	1%	31%	13%	3%	23%	3%
Cadem	June 15–16, 2017	1%	2%	13%	2%			2%	6%	1%	25%	9%	5%	34%	3.6%
Cadem	June 21–23, 2017		2%	12%	3%			3%	6%	1%	24%	9%	6%	34%	3.6%
Cadem	June 28–29, 2017	1%	1%	9%	5%	1%		3%	7%	1%	22%	11%	4%	35%	3.6%
Cadem	July 5–7, 2017		1%	9%	1%	1%			2%	1%	30%	15%	5%	35%	3.7%
Adimark	July 4–26, 2017	1%	1%	16%	2%	1%	1%		2%	1%	32%	17%	4%	22%	3%
Adimark^{a}	July 4–26, 2017	1%	1%	21%	2%	1%	1%		1%	1%	39%	20%	2%	10%	3%
Criteria Research	July 14–19, 2017	1%	3%	13%	5%	1%			3%		37%	19%	14%	6%	3.4%
CEP	July 21-August 17, 2017	1.6%	2.2%	14.5%	0.5%	0.4%	0.1%	0.1%	1.1%	1.1%	31.3%	10.2%	1.4%	35.5%	3%
Criteria Research	August 11–17, 2017	2%	4%	15%		2%					35%	17%	18%	7%	3.4%
Adimark	August 3–29, 2017	1%	5%	16%	1%	2%					34%	15%	4%	22%	3%
Adimark^{b}	August 3–29, 2017	1%	7%	21%	1%	2%					40%	16%	2%	10%	3%
Criteria Research	September 21–24, 2017	3%	3%	17%		3%					34%	17%	18%	5%	3.4%
CERC-Mori	September 1–12, 2017	2%	2%	20%		1%					31%	8%	35%		3%
CEP	September 22-October 16, 2017	3.4%	2.3%	13.8%							32.8%	7.0%	4.3%	36.4%	3%
Criteria Research	October 20–30, 2017	4%	5%	18%		7%					33%	15%	12%	6%	2.5%

^{a} Likely voter (52%).
^{b} Likely voter (49%).

=== First round ===
Question: "Given the following list of candidates, who would you vote for?"

Legend
—	Not on the list
	Wins election
	May win election
	Runoff
	May go to a runoff

Polling firm	Field dates	Artés	MEO	Goic	Guillier	JA Kast	Navarro	Piñera	Sánchez	Others	DK/NR	Error	Sample
CERC-Mori	December 7–15, 2016	—	5%	—	19%	—	—	23%	—	19%	34%	2.8%	Total (n=1200)
CERC-Mori	March 28-April 10, 2017	—	3%	2%	14%	0%	0%	26%	4%	51%		2.8%	Total (n=1200)
Criteria Research	May 2–12, 2017	—	3%	3%	19%	3%	—	33%	21%	7%	12%	3.4%	Total (n=810)
Activa Research	June 2–9, 2017	—	1.6%	2.1%	13.9%	<1%	<1%	21.4%	7.1%	11.8%	42.1%	2.6%	Total (n=1395)
Criteria Research	June 1–11, 2017	—	5%	6%	19%	2%	—	36%	18%	1%	13%	3.4%	Total (n=814)
CERC-Mori	June 6–15, 2017	—	3%	5%	18%	—	1%	26%	10%	38%		2.8%	Total (n=1200)
Cadem	July 5–7, 2017	—	2%	3%	16%	4%	—	38%	26%	3%	8%	5.4%	Likely voter (45%, n=324)
Activa Research	July 7–12, 2017	—	0.6%	1.3%	14.0%	2.4%	<1%	28.3%	12.0%	3.9%	37.5%	2.6%	Total (n=1440)
Cadem	July 12–14, 2017	—	2%	2%	20%	4%	—	40%	23%	3%	6%	5.4%	Likely voter (45%, n=326)
Criteria Research	July 14–19, 2017	—	5%	5%	14%	3%	—	38%	23%	5%	7%	3.4%	Total (n=825)
Cadem	July 19–21, 2017	—	2%	2%	21%	4%	—	40%	21%	2%	8%	5.6%	Likely voter (44%, n=310)
Cadem	July 26–28, 2017	—	4%	3%	22%	5%	—	42%	19%	1%	4%	5.3%	Likely voter (43%, n=345)
CEP^{a}	July 21-August 17, 2017	—	2.4%	5.3%	17.8%	3.3%	—	39.7%	17.9%	2.9%	10.7%	4.1%	Will "surely" go to vote (40%, n=569)
Criteria Research	August 11–17, 2017	—	2%	8%	18%	9%	—	38%	22%		3%	5.1%	Likely voter (45%, n=365)
Cadem	August 3–25, 2017	0%	2%	5%	19%	4%	0%	42%	19%		9%	2.8%	Likely voter (44%, n=1228)
Activa Research	August 11–18, 2017	<1%	1.7%	1%	17.9%	1.1%	<1%	44.4%	19.2%	1.5%	13.2%	3.8%	Likely voter (42.4%, n=673)
CERC-Mori	September 1–12, 2017	0%	4%	8%	30%	2%	1%	44%	11%			4.2%	Likely voter (45%, n=540)
Cadem	August 30-September 29, 2017	0%	3%	5%	20%	4%	0%	43%	15%		10%	2.3%	Likely voter (47%, n=1782)
Criteria Research	September 21–24, 2017	0%	1%	8%	19%	6%	0%	36%	24%		6%	4.7%	Likely voter (49%, n=430)
Activa Research	September 21–28, 2017	<0.5%	6.1%	2.2%	11.2%	8.6%	<0.5%	45.2%	15.5%		10.7%	4.4%	Likely voter (32.9%, n=487)
CEP^{a}	September 22-October 16, 2017	0.1%	4.6%	3.9%	19.7%	2.7%	0.5%	44.4%	8.5%		15.6%	3.9%^{b}	Likely voter (44%, n=627^{b})
Cadem	October 4–26, 2017	0%	4%	4%	21%	5%	0%	43%	13%		10%	1.8%	Likely voter (49%, n=2964)
Criteria Research	October 20–30, 2017	1%	5%	6%	24%	6%	0%	39%	15%		4%	3.6%	Likely voter (46%, n=724)
Cadem	October 31-November 2, 2017	1%	6%	5%	20%	6%	1%	42%	13%		7%	3.5%	Likely voter (48%, n=796)
Cadem	November 8–10, 2017	0.5%	7%	6%	20%	7%	0.5%	39%	13%		7%	N/A%	Likely voter (48%, n=N/A)
Activa Research	November 8–17, 2017	0.5%	5.5%	3.9%	21.1%	5.4%	0.1%	35.1%	14.0%		14.3%	3.1%	Likely voter (48.9%, n=989)
Cadem	November 14–16, 2017	0.5%	5%	6%	21%	6%	0.5%	40%	13%		8%	3.6%	Likely voter (46%, n=727)

^{a} Ballot-box vote. ^{b} Estimated.

=== Second round ===
Question: "If the following two candidates proceed to a runoff election, who would you vote for?"

Legend
—	Not on the list
	Wins election
	May win election

Polling firm	Field dates	MEO	Goic	Guillier	JA Kast	Navarro	Piñera	Sánchez	DK/NR	Error	Sample
Criteria Research	November 28-December 7, 2016	—	—	42%	—	—	39%	—	18%	3.4%	Total (n=822)
CERC-Mori	December 7–15, 2016	—	—	35%	—	—	30%	—	35%	2.8%	Total (n=1200)
Criteria Research	December 27, 2016 – January 4, 2017	—	—	42%	—	—	41%	—	17%	3.4%	Total (n=807)
Criteria Research	January 25-February 2, 2017	—	—	43%	—	—	43%	—	14%	4.4%	100% probability of voting (60%, n=487)
Criteria Research	January 25-February 2, 2017	—	13%	—	—	—	45%	—	14%	3.5%	Total (n=805)
Criteria Research	March 1–10, 2017	—	—	41%	—	—	36%	—	23%	3.3%	Total (n=869)
Criteria Research	March 1–10, 2017	—	18%	—	—	—	39%	—	42%	3.3%	Total (n=869)
CERC-Mori	March 28-April 10, 2017	—	—	33%	—	—	32%	—	35%	2.8%	Total (n=1200)
CERC-Mori	March 28-April 10, 2017	—	18%	—	—	—	33%	—	49%	2.8%	Total (n=1200)
CERC-Mori	March 28-April 10, 2017	—	—	—	—	10%	35%	—	55%	2.8%	Total (n=1200)
Criteria Research	April 4–11, 2017	—	—	37%	—	—	41%	—	22%	3.4%	Total (n=852)
Criteria Research	April 4–11, 2017	—	—	—	—	—	43%	32%	26%	3.4%	Total (n=852)
Criteria Research	April 4–11, 2017	—	18%	—	—	—	45%	—	37%	3.4%	Total (n=852)
Criteria Research	May 2–12, 2017	—	—	40%	—	—	41%	—	19%	3.4%	Total (n=810)
Criteria Research	May 2–12, 2017	—	—	—	—	—	41%	42%	17%	3.4%	Total (n=810)
Criteria Research	May 2–12, 2017	—	22%	—	—	—	43%	—	35%	3.4%	Total (n=810)
CEP	April 26-May 22, 2017	—	14.2%	—	—	—	36.0%	—	49.8%	2.5%	Total (n=1481)
CEP	April 26-May 22, 2017	—	—	28.7%	—	—	32.9%	—	38.4%	2.5%	Total (n=1481)
Criteria Research	June 1–11, 2017	—	—	40%	—	—	43%	—	17%	3.4%	Total (n=814)
Criteria Research	June 1–11, 2017	—	—	—	—	—	45%	33%	22%	3.4%	Total (n=814)
Criteria Research	June 1–11, 2017	—	27%	—	—	—	42%	—	31%	3.4%	Total (n=814)
CERC-Mori	June 6–15, 2017	—	—	35%	—	—	32%	—	33%	2.8%	Total (n=1200)
CERC-Mori	June 6–15, 2017	—	23%	—	—	—	33%	—	44%	2.8%	Total (n=1200)
CERC-Mori	June 6–15, 2017	—	—	—	—	—	33%	26%	41%	2.8%	Total (n=1200)
Criteria Research	July 14–19, 2017	—	—	37%	—	—	45%	—	18%	3.4%	Total (n=825)
Criteria Research	July 14–19, 2017	—	—	—	—	—	45%	42%	13%	3.4%	Total (n=825)
Criteria Research	July 14–19, 2017	—	24%	—	—	—	45%	—	31%	3.4%	Total (n=825)
Criteria Research	July 14–19, 2017	27%	—	—	—	—	47%	—	26%	3.4%	Total (n=825)
Cadem	July 5–28, 2017	—	—	39%	—	—	49%	—	12%	2.7%	Likely voter (46%, n=1327)
Cadem	July 5–28, 2017	—	—	—	—	—	48%	42%	10%	2.7%	Likely voter (46%, n=1327)
Cadem	July 5–28, 2017	—	27%	—	—	—	50%	—	23%	2.7%	Likely voter (46%, n=1327)
Activa Research	July 7–12, 2017	—	—	23.7%	—	—	32.8%	—	43.5%	2.6%	Total (n=1440)
Activa Research	July 7–12, 2017	—	—	—	—	—	32.7%	28.3%	39.0%	2.6%	Total (n=1440)
CEP^{a}	July 21-August 17, 2017	—	23.7%	—	—	—	48.9%	—	27.5%	4.1%	Will "surely" go to vote (40%, n=569)
CEP^{a}	July 21-August 17, 2017	—	—	—	—	—	45.7%	34.9%	19.4%	4.1%	Will "surely" go to vote (40%, n=569)
CEP^{a}	July 21-August 17, 2017	—	—	35.7%	—	—	46.6%	—	17.7%	4.1%	Will "surely" go to vote (40%, n=569)
Criteria Research	August 11–17, 2017	—	—	38%	—	—	46%	—	16%	5.1%	Likely voter (45%, n=368)
Criteria Research	August 11–17, 2017	—	—	—	—	—	48%	41%	11%	5.1%	Likely voter (45%, n=368)
Criteria Research	August 11–17, 2017	—	33%	—	—	—	48%	—	19%	5.1%	Likely voter (45%, n=368)
Criteria Research	August 11–17, 2017	25%	—	—	—	—	49%	—	26%	5.1%	Likely voter (45%, n=368)
Activa Research	August 11–18, 2017	—	—	33.9%	—	—	46.9%	—	19.2%	4%	Likely voter (42.4%, n=600)
Activa Research	August 11–18, 2017	—	—	—	—	—	46.8%	29.7%	23.5%	4%	Likely voter (42.4%, n=600)
Cadem	August 3–25, 2017	—	—	37%	—	—	49%	—	14%	2.8%	Likely voter (44%, n=1228)
Cadem	August 3–25, 2017	—	—	—	—	—	50%	39%	11%	2.8%	Likely voter (44%, n=1228)
Cadem	August 3–25, 2017	—	27%	—	—	—	51%	—	22%	2.8%	Likely voter (44%, n=1228)
Cadem	August 3–25, 2017	24%	—	—	—	—	53%	—	23%	2.8%	Likely voter (44%, n=1228)
Cadem	August 30-September 29, 2017	—	—	38%	—	—	50%	—	12%	2.3%	Likely voter (47%, n=1782)
Cadem	August 30-September 29, 2017	—	—	—	—	—	50%	36%	14%	2.3%	Likely voter (47%, n=1782)
Cadem	August 30-September 29, 2017	—	28%	—	—	—	51%	—	21%	2.3%	Likely voter (47%, n=1782)
Cadem	August 30-September 29, 2017	24%	—	—	—	—	52%	—	24%	2.3%	Likely voter (47%, n=1782)
Criteria Research	September 21–24, 2017	—	—	44%	—	—	45%	—	11%	4.7%	Likely voter (45%, n=430)
Criteria Research	September 21–24, 2017	—	—	—	—	—	46%	45%	9%	4.7%	Likely voter (45%, n=430)
Criteria Research	September 21–24, 2017	—	30%	—	—	—	45%	—	25%	4.7%	Likely voter (45%, n=430)
Criteria Research	September 21–24, 2017	28%	—	—	—	—	49%	—	23%	4.7%	Likely voter (45%, n=430)
Activa Research	September 21–28, 2017	—	—	29%	—	—	48.2%	—	22.8%	4.4%	Likely voter (32.9%, n=487)
Activa Research	September 21–28, 2017	—	—	—	—	—	48.8%	31.4%	19.8%	4.4%	Likely voter (32.9%, n=487)
CEP^{a}	September 22-October 16, 2017	—	19.7%	—	—	—	40.0%	—	40.3%	2.6%	Total (n=1424)
CEP^{a}	September 22-October 16, 2017	—	—	—	—	—	39.7%	23.3%	37.0%	2.6%	Total (n=1424)
CEP^{a}	September 22-October 16, 2017	—	—	27.2%	—	—	39.4%	—	33.4%	2.6%	Total (n=1424)
Cadem	October 4–26, 2017	—	—	38%	—	—	50%	—	12%	1.8%	Likely voter (49%, n=2964)
Cadem	October 4–26, 2017	—	—	—	—	—	51%	35%	14%	1.8%	Likely voter (49%, n=2964)
Cadem	October 4–26, 2017	—	29%	—	—	—	50%	—	21%	1.8%	Likely voter (49%, n=2964)
Cadem	October 4–26, 2017	25%	—	—	—	—	52%	—	23%	1.8%	Likely voter (49%, n=2964)
Cadem	October 4–26, 2017	—	—	—	15%	—	49%	—	36%	1.8%	Likely voter (49%, n=2964)
Criteria Research	October 20–30, 2017	—	—	46%	—	—	49%	—	5%	3.6%	Likely voter (46%, n=724)
Criteria Research	October 20–30, 2017	—	—	—	—	—	49%	41%	10%	3.6%	Likely voter (46%, n=724)
Activa Research	November 8–17, 2017	—	—	38.8%	—	—	44.1%	—	17.0%	3.1%	Likely voter (48.9%, n=989)
Activa Research	November 8–17, 2017	—	—	—	—	—	45.8%	36.3%	17.8%	3.1%	Likely voter (48.9%, n=989)
Cadem	October 31-November 2, 2017	—	—	38%	—	—	50%	—	12%	3.5%	Likely voter (48%, n=796)
Cadem	October 31-November 2, 2017	—	—	—	—	—	51%	36%	13%	3.5%	Likely voter (48%, n=796)
Cadem	October 31-November 2, 2017	—	31%	—	—	—	50%	—	19%	3.5%	Likely voter (48%, n=796)
Cadem	October 31-November 2, 2017	29%	—	—	—	—	51%	—	20%	3.5%	Likely voter (48%, n=796)
Cadem	October 31-November 2, 2017	—	—	—	18%	—	49%	—	33%	3.5%	Likely voter (48%, n=796)
Cadem	November 8–10, 2017	—	—	38%	—	—	48%	—	14%	N/A%	Likely voter (48%, n=N/A)
Cadem	November 14–16, 2017	—	—	39%	—	—	48%	—	13%	3.6%	Likely voter (46%, n=727)
Cadem	November 22–24, 2017	—	—	37.3%	—	—	39.8%	—	22.9%	2.6%	Total (n=1442)
Criteria Research	November 22–28, 2017	—	—	46%	—	—	51%	—	3%	3.7%	Likely voter (44%, n=702)
Cadem	November 29-December 1, 2017	—	—	38.6%	—	—	40.0%	—	21.4%	2.6%	Total (n=1439)
Cadem	December 13–15, 2017	—	—	33.4%	—	—	39.6%	—	27.0%	2.6%	Total (n=1455)

^{a} Ballot-box vote.
