= Luis Larraín =

Chilean LGBT rights activist (1980–2023)

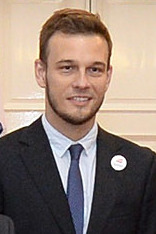
- Larraín in 2016
- Born: Luis Alberto Larraín Stieb; 30 December 1980; Santiago, Chile
- Died: 17 November 2023 (aged 42); Santiago, Chile
- Occupations: Civil engineer; LGBT activist

Luis Alberto Larraín Stieb (30 December 1980 – 17 November 2023) was a Chilean LGBT rights activist and civil engineer.

In 2013, Larraín succeeded writer Pablo Simonetti as president of Fundación Iguales, a major LGBT rights organization in Chile.

As president of the foundation, despite undergoing two kidney transplants, Larraín became one of the main campaigners to achieve the approval of a civil union law in notoriously conservative Chile. Since 22 October 2015, same-sex couples and households headed by same-sex couples have the same legal protections available to opposite-sex married couples within a civil union, except for adoption rights and the title of marriage. Fundación Iguales also promotes dialogue and cooperation with partner groups made up of women and Indigenous peoples. In November 2015, he was elected among the top 50 diversity figures in public life by The Economist for his impact on diversity.

Larraín held a degree in engineering from Pontifical Catholic University of Chile and a master's degree in international relations from Sciences Po. He was also a model.

In 12 March 2017, he announced a candidacy for deputy in the parliamentary elections for District 10 (communes of Santiago, Providencia, La Granja, Macul, Ñuñoa and San Joaquín), supported by the Citizens party and the Future Sense coalition. However, on 21 August 2017, Larraín announced that he was running as an independent in the centre-right Chile Vamos coalition, supported by Evópoli. He received 8,303 votes out of 436,469 and was not among the 8 elected.

Luis Larraín died from non-Hodgkin lymphoma on 17 November 2023, at the age of 42.
