= Todos (Chile) =

Political party in Chile

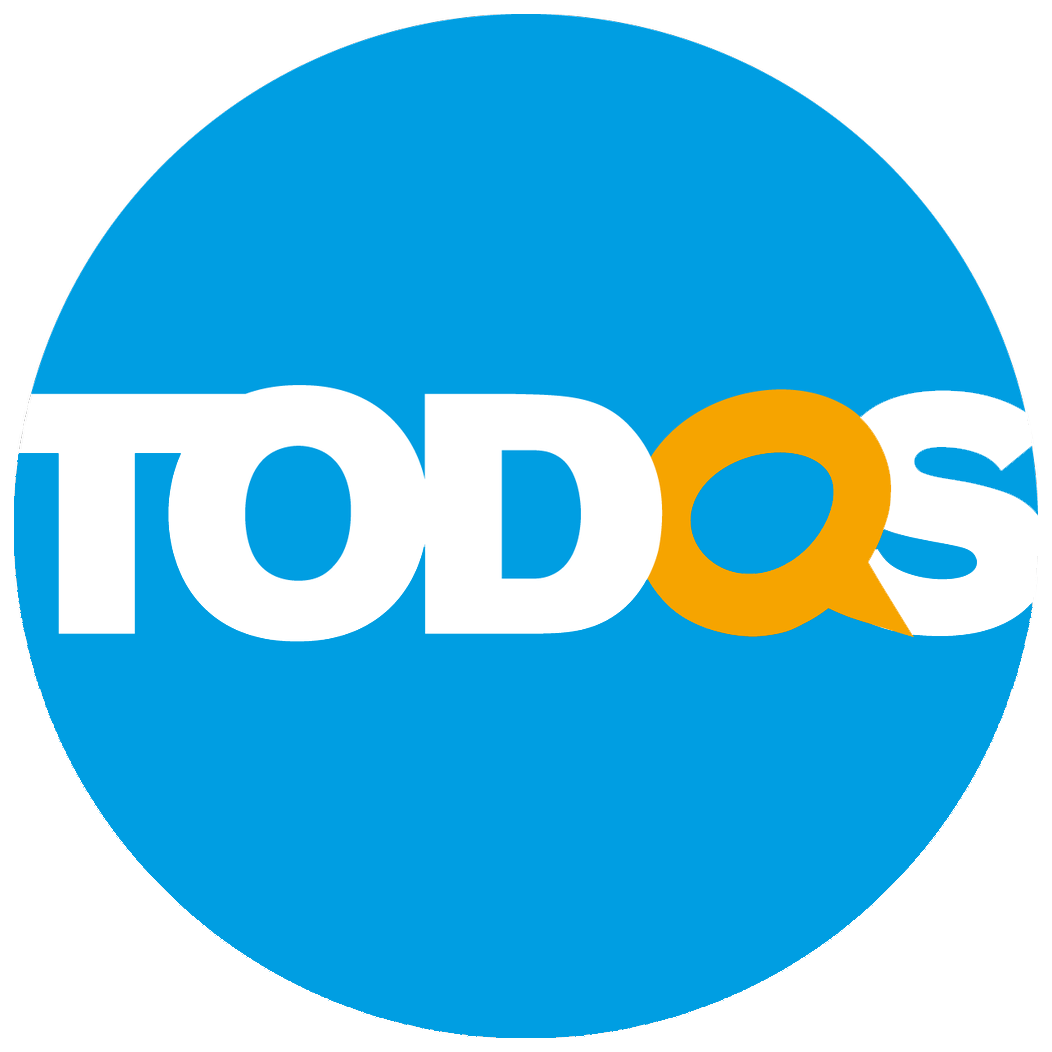
- President: Gabriel Gurovich
- Secretary: Jorge Ossa
- Founded: 14 October 2015
- Legalised: 7 June 2016
- Membership (2017): 2797
- Ideology: Big tent
- Political position: Centre
- National affiliation: Sumemos
- Colors: Sky blue
- Chamber of Deputies: 0 / 120
- Senate: 0 / 38

Website
- http://www.todos.cl/

Todos (Spanish for 'Everybody') is a centrist political party in Chile.

The party was founded in 2015 by the creator of Start-up Chile, Nicolás Shea, and the former executive director of Chile 21, Ángeles Fernández. Todos defines itself as a catch-all and transversal party. It was registered on August 19, 2015, and reportedly legalized on June 7, 2016.

For the 2017 presidential election, "Everybody" presented Nicolás Shea and television host Nicolás Larraín as presidential candidates, but neither were registered and the party was left without a candidate for the first round. On August 7, 2017, it joined the Amplitude and Citizens parties in the Sumemos coalition.

== Presidential candidates ==
The following is a list of the presidential candidates supported by the Everybody Party. (Information gathered from the Archive of Chilean Elections).

- 2017: none
