= 2017 Chilean general election =

- Presidential election
- 19 November 2017 (first round); 17 December 2017 (second round)
- Opinion polls
- Turnout: 46.72% (first round) ▼2.63pp 49.02% (second round) ▲7.04pp
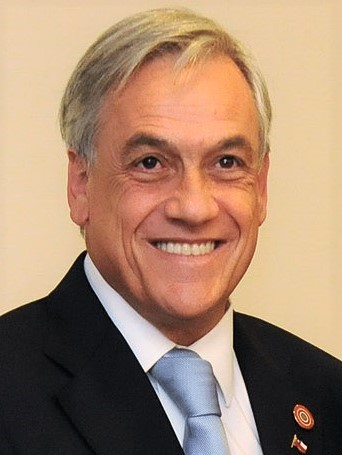

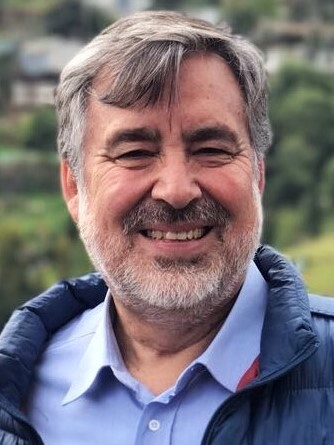
Candidate	Sebastián Piñera	Alejandro Guillier
Party	Independent	Independent
Alliance	Chile Vamos	Force of the Majority
Popular vote	3,796,918	3,160,628
Percentage	54.57%	45.43%
President before election
Michelle Bachelet
Socialist
Elected President
Sebastián Piñera
Independent
- Chamber of Deputies
- All 155 seats in the Chamber of Deputies; 78 seats needed for a majority
Party	Vote %	Seats	+/–
Chile Vamos	38.68	72	+23
Force of the Majority	24.06	43	−1
Broad Front	16.49	20	+17
Democratic Convergence	10.68	14	−9
All Over Chile	3.92	1	+1
Green Regionalist	1.92	4	+3
Independents	1.75	1	−2
This lists parties that won seats. See the complete results below.
Results by constituency
- Senate
- 23 of the 43 seats in the Senate
Party	Vote %	Seats	+/–
Chile Vamos	37.71	12	+5
Force of the Majority	22.82	7	+3
Democratic Convergence	14.32	3	−1
Broad Front	11.06	1	+1
This lists parties that won seats. See the complete results below.
Results by constituency

General elections were held in Chile on 19 November 2017 to elect the president, all 155 members of the Chamber of Deputies, 23 of the 43 members of the Senate and 278 members of regional boards. All elected members would serve a four-year term, aside from the senators would serve for eight years.

In the presidential election, former president Sebastián Piñera received a lower-than-expected 36% of the vote, nearly 14 points ahead of senator Alejandro Guillier, who was backed by the sitting administration. In the runoff election on 17 December 2017, Piñera surprised many by defeating Guillier with 54% of the vote, and turnout was two points higher than in the first round.

In the parliamentary elections, the Chile Vamos coalition, which supported Piñera's candidacy, won 46% of the Chamber of Deputies and 44% of the Senate, while the governing New Majority alliance, which competed without the Christian Democrats for the first time in 28 years, failed to retain its majority in both chambers, receiving just 28% and 35% in the lower and upper chambers, respectively. The leftist bloc Broad Front elected 20 deputies (13%) and gained one senator. The Christian Democratic Party received 9% of the lower chamber and secured 14% of the Senate.

Following an election reform in 2015, the Chamber of Deputies grew in size to 155 members from the previous 120, while the Senate increased its membership from 38 to 43 after this election, and will grow to 50 following the election in 2021. Multi-seat constituencies were reestablished, replacing the previous binomial system of two seats per district, installed by the outgoing Pinochet dictatorship in 1989. Starting with this election, Chile's congress was elected through open list proportional representation under the D'Hondt method. Also for the first time, a 40% gender quota was put in place for candidates of each political party in parliamentary elections.

All the newly elected officials began their terms on 11 March 2018.

This was the first non-primary election in which Chilean citizens voted from abroad.

== Presidential primaries ==
According to the Constitution, primaries are voluntary but its results are binding. Sebastián Piñera won the Chile Vamos primary with 58% of the vote while Beatriz Sánchez became the Broad Front (Frente Amplio) nominee with nearly 68%.

== Presidential candidates ==
These candidates officially registered their candidacies before the national election authority (Servel), either directly, or via a primary election victory. All candidacies were accepted (met legal requirements) by the Servel on September 1, 2017 and were officially registered on September 12, 2017, after no legal challenges were raised.

Candidate	Endorsement	Ideology
Eduardo Artés; Patriotic Union	Patriotic Union	Communism; Marxism–Leninism
Marco Enríquez-Ominami; Progressive Party	Progressive Party	Democratic socialism; Progressivism
Carolina Goic; Christian Democratic Party	Christian Democratic Party	
Alejandro Guillier; Independent	The Force of the Majority: MAS Region; Communist Party; Citizen Left; Party for Democracy; Social Democrat Radical Party; Socialist Party; Independent electors	
José Antonio Kast; Independent	Independent electors	Conservatism; Right-wing populism
Alejandro Navarro; País	País	
Sebastián Piñera; Independent	Chile Vamos: Political Evolution; Independent Regionalist Party; National Renewal; Independent Democratic Union; Amplitude	
Beatriz Sánchez; Independent	Broad Front (Frente Amplio): Humanist Party; Liberal Party; Democratic Revolution; Power; Green Ecologist Party; Equality Party	

=== Chile Vamos ===
==== Nominee ====
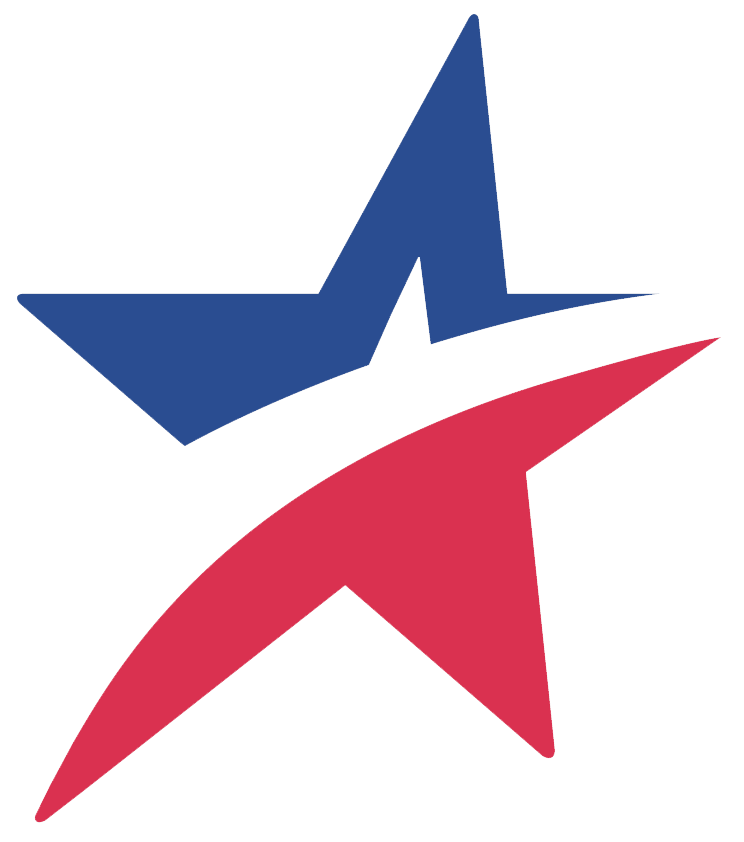

2017 Chile Vamos Candidate
Sebastián Piñera
for President

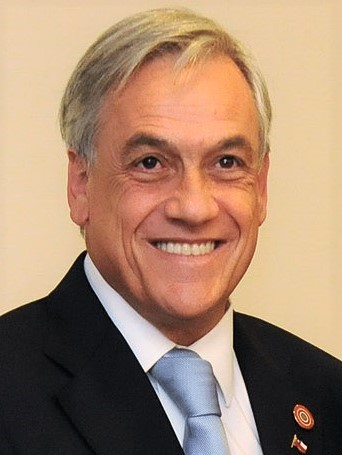

President of Chile
(2010–2014)

==== Candidates ====
The former president was proclaimed as candidate by the Independent Regionalist Party on 17 December 2016, by the Independent Democratic Union on 24 March 2017, and two days later by his former party, National Renewal. On 2 July 2017 Sebastián Piñera won the Chile Vamos primary, thereby officially becoming a presidential candidate. On 8 July 2017, Amplitude —a party that is not member of Chile Vamos— proclaimed him as its candidate. On 6 August 2017, Political Evolution, which had supported Felipe Kast during the primaries, officially joined Piñera's campaign team.

Sebastián Piñera won the primary with 58% of the vote.

Candidates in this section are sorted by reverse date of withdrawal from the primary
Manuel José Ossandón (Ind-RN)	Felipe Kast (Evopoli)	Alberto Espina (RN)	Francisco Chahuán (RN)	Francisco de la Maza (UDI)
Senator from Santiago Metropolitan Region (2014–present)	Deputy from Central Santiago (2014–2018)	Senator from Araucanía (2002–2018)	Senator from Valparaíso Region (2010–present)	Mayor of Las Condes (2000–2016)
LN: 2 July 2017; 372,215 votes	LN: 2 July 2017; 218,489 votes	W: 21 March 2017	W: 6 March 2017	W: 11 September 2016

=== The Force of the Majority ===
==== Presidential nominee ====
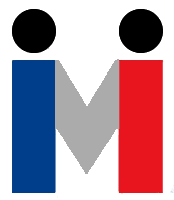

2017 The Force of the Majority Candidate
Alejandro Guillier
for President

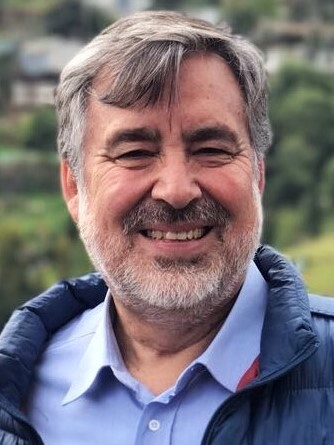

Senator
from Antofagasta Region
(2014–present)

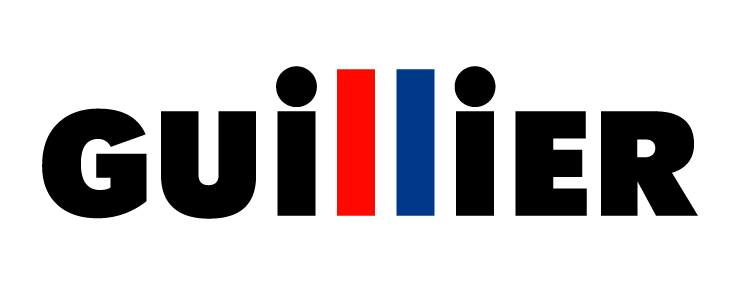

==== Candidates ====
Alejandro Guillier was proclaimed by the Social Democrat Radical Party as candidate on 7 January 2017. On 9 April 2017 he was chosen by the Socialist Party's Central Committee as its candidate after a secret election in which he beat former president Ricardo Lagos by nearly two-thirds of the vote; he was proclaimed as candidate by that party on 21 April 2017. On 7 May 2017, the Communist Party proclaimed him as their candidate. On 13 May 2017 the Party for Democracy unanimously proclaimed him as their candidate in a show of hands. As the New Majority coalition failed to organize a primary and Guillier decided to stay as an independent, he was forced to collect thousands of signatures in order to compete. On 4 August 2017 he officially registered his candidacy before the Servel, presenting 61,403 signatures, more than the 33 thousand needed to register an independent candidacy.

Candidates in this section are sorted by reverse date of withdrawal from the failed primaries
Carolina Goic (PDC)	Ricardo Lagos (PPD)	Fernando Atria (PS)	José Miguel Insulza (PS)	Francisco Huenchumilla (PDC)	Jorge Tarud (PPD)	Ignacio Walker (PDC)	Isabel Allende (PS)
Senator from Magallanes (2014–present)	President of Chile (2000–2006)	University of Chile; Law professor (2011–present)	Secretary General of the Organization of American States (2005–2015)	Intendant of Araucanía (2014–2015)	Deputy from South Maule (2002–2018)	Senator from Valparaíso Region (2010–2018)	Senator from Atacama (2010–present)
W: 29 April 2017; Announced to run directly as PDC nominee	W: 10 April 2017	W: 1 April 2017	W: 1 April 2017	W: 5 February 2017	W: 14 January 2017	W: 3 December 2016	W: 28 October 2016

=== Broad Front ===
==== Nominee ====

2017 Broad Front Candidate
Beatriz Sánchez
for President

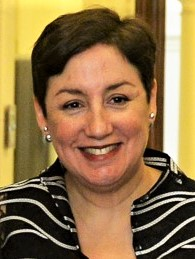

TV and Radio
Journalist

==== Candidates ====
The journalist announced on 21 March 2017 during her own radio show that she was quitting her job to think about the possibility of running for president. On 31 March 2017 she gained the official support from both Democratic Revolution and Autonomist Movement. She launched her candidacy on 3 April 2017 at a rally near Plaza Baquedano in Santiago. On 16 April 2017 she was proclaimed as candidate by the Humanist Party, and on 23 April 2017 the Libertarian Left gave her its support. On 9 May 2017 she was proclaimed as candidate by the Poder party, and four days later by the Progressive Democratic Movement. On 14 May 2017 the Autonomous Left proclaimed her as their candidate. On 29 May 2017 the Liberal Party proclaimed her as their candidate, while on 6 June 2017, the Green Ecologist Party did the same. On 2 July 2017 she won the Broad Front primary with nearly 68% of the vote. Her primary win was officially sanctioned by the Election Court (Tricel) on 24 July 2017 during a ceremony in Santiago. On 31 July 2017, Sánchez presented her campaign team, which included members of the Equality Party, which had supported her primary opponent, Alberto Mayol.

Candidates in this section are sorted by reverse date of withdrawal from the primary
Alberto Mayol (Ind.)	Luis Mariano Rendón (Ind-Pirate)	Claudia Sanhueza (RD)	Sebastián Depolo (RD)	Luis Mesina (Ind.)
USACH Management and Public Policies professor (2013–present)	Chair of the Ecological Action Network	UDP; Economics professor	Leader of Democratic Revolution (2015–2016)	Chair of No+AFP Workers Cordinator (2016–present)
LN: 2 July 2017; 106,300 votes	V: 13 April 2017	W: 21 March 2017	W: 21 March 2017	W: 10 January 2017

=== Other candidates ===
Independent Candidate	2017 Christian Democratic Candidate	2017 Progressive Candidate	2017 Patriotic Union Candidate	2017 País Candidate
José Antonio Kast	Carolina Goic	Marco Enríquez-Ominami	Eduardo Artés	Alejandro Navarro (politician)
for President	for President	for President	for President	for President
Deputy from La Reina and Peñalolén (2002–2018)	Senator from Magallanes (2014–present)	2013 presidential candidate	Public Education; History teacher	Senator from Biobío (2014–present)
The current deputy and former UDI party member stated on 8 March 2017 he would not participate in a Chile Vamos primary and would instead collect the necessary signatures needed to become an independent candidate to run directly in the November 2017 election. On 18 August 2017 he officially registered his independent candidacy before the Servel, presenting 43,461 signatures.	Main article: New Majority presidential primary, 2017 The current senator for Magallanes was proclaimed by the Christian Democratic Party as candidate on 11 March 2017. On 29 April 2017, the PDC decided not to participate in a New Majority primary, breaking away from the coalition after 28 years. On 11 May 2017 Goic officially registered her pre-candidacy before the Servel, accompanied by former president Eduardo Frei Ruiz-Tagle. On 19 August 2017 the PDC officially registered her candidacy before the Servel.	The former candidate in the past two presidential elections announced his candidacy on 7 September 2016. On 19 May 2017 he officially registered his pre-candidacy before the election authority. On 20 August 2017 his party officially registered his candidacy before the Servel.	The teacher and president of the Patriotic Union was registered before the Servel by his party on 22 July 2017.	The current senator for Biobío and former MAS party member announced his intention to run as president on 24 March 2017. He has the support of the newly formed País party. On 18 August 2017 País officially registered his candidacy before the Servel.

=== Unsuccessful candidacies ===
- Carola Canelo (Ind.): The lawyer and academic announced on 16 November 2016 her intention to run for president. On 21 August 2017 —the deadline to register candidacies— the press reported that her official website stated that she had only gathered 6,257 out of the 33,493 signatures needed to register an independent candidacy.
- Tomás Jocelyn-Holt (Ind.): The 2013 candidate announced on 7 June 2017, during a television interview, that he was willing to run again as president, representing The Other Chile (El Otro Chile) coalition. However, on 15 August 2017 he said he had failed to gather the required number of signatures to register as an independent candidate though he vowed to run in 2022.
- Nicolás Larraín (Ind.): On 12 December 2016, the television host announced his presidential candidacy. On 19 June 2017 he announced he was quitting his candidacy and giving his support to then Chile Vamos primary candidate for Evópoli Felipe Kast.
- Franco Parisi (Ind.): The former presidential candidate stated on 17 January 2017 he was mulling over the possibility of running again in 2017 after the Regional Democracy party said it would support him. On 4 August 2017, he put an end to his presidential candidacy, opting instead to compete for a seat in the Senate.
- Luis Riveros (Ind.): The former rector of the University of Chile said on 28 October 2016 he was willing to run for president. On 7 April 2017, La Tercera daily announced he was stepping out of the race.

== Presidential election ==
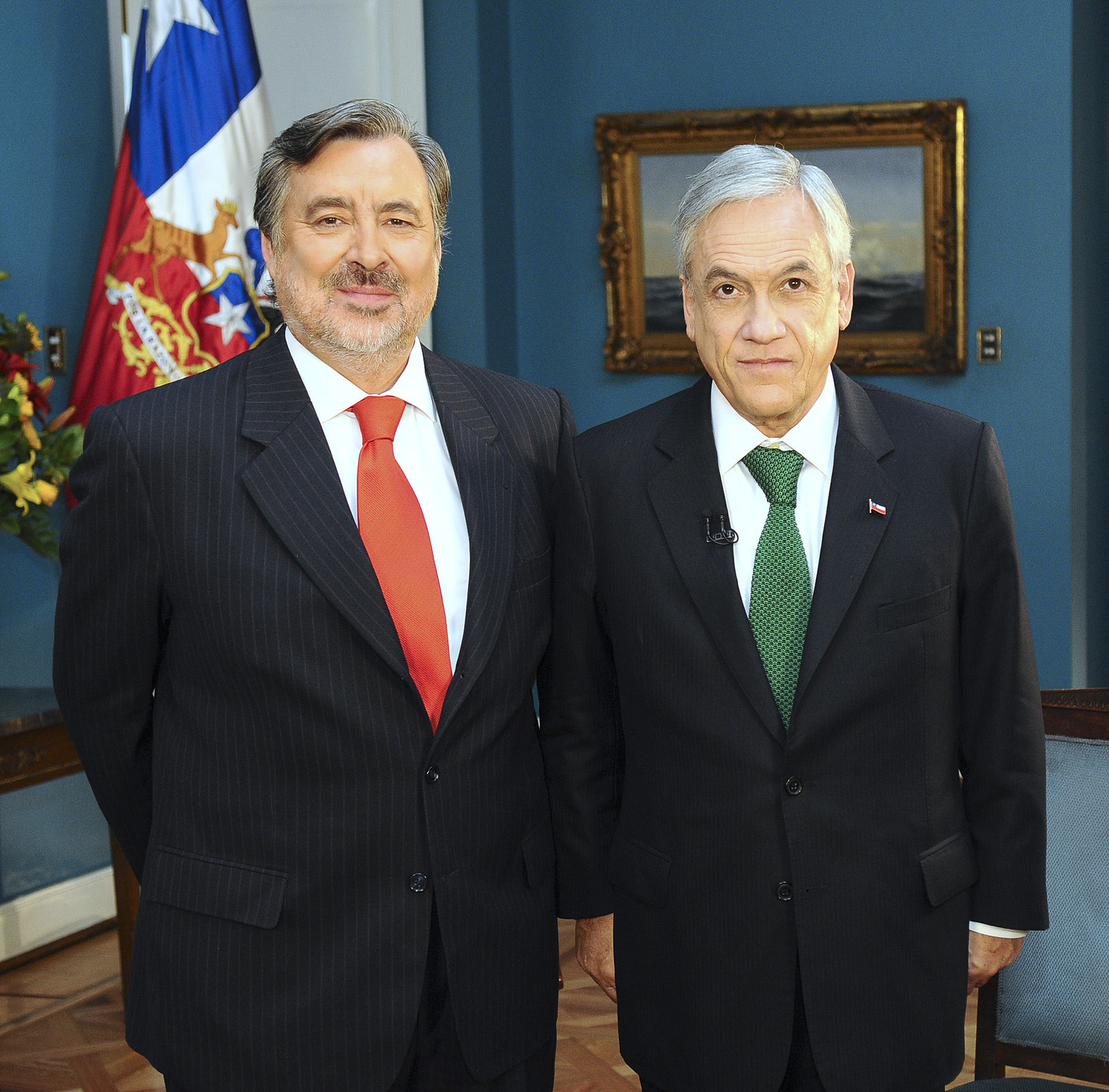
The two candidates making it to a second round: Alejandro Guillier (left) and Sebastián Piñera.

=== Results ===
Presidential election results by commune in the first round (left) and second round (right).

Candidate	Party	First round		Second round	
Candidate	Party	Votes	%	Votes	%
Sebastián Piñera	Independent (Chile Vamos)	2,418,540	36.64	3,796,918	54.57
Alejandro Guillier	Independent (The Force of the Majority)	1,498,040	22.70	3,160,628	45.43
Beatriz Sánchez	Independent (Broad Front)	1,338,037	20.27		
José Antonio Kast	Independent	523,375	7.93		
Carolina Goic	Christian Democratic Party	387,784	5.88		
Marco Enríquez-Ominami	Progressive Party	376,871	5.71		
Eduardo Artés	Patriotic Union	33,665	0.51		
Alejandro Navarro	País	23,968	0.36		
Total		6,600,280	100.00	6,957,546	100.00
Valid votes		6,600,280	98.46	6,957,546	98.93
Invalid votes		64,504	0.96	56,440	0.80
Blank votes		38,543	0.57	18,892	0.27
Total votes		6,703,327	100.00	7,032,878	100.00
Registered voters/turnout		14,347,288	46.72	14,347,288	49.02
Source: First round: Tricel via Diario Oficial. Second round: Tricel via Electoral Service.

== Chamber of Deputies election ==
Revised provisional results.

Distribution by parties (left) and coalitions (right)
Party or alliance		Votes	%	Seats
Chile Vamos	National Renewal	1,067,270	17.80	36
Chile Vamos	Independent Democratic Union	957,245	15.96	30
Chile Vamos	Evópoli	255,221	4.26	6
Chile Vamos	Independent Regionalist Party	39,692	0.66	0
Chile Vamos	Total	2,319,428	38.68	72
The Force of the Majority	Socialist Party	585,128	9.76	19
The Force of the Majority	Party for Democracy	365,988	6.10	8
The Force of the Majority	Communist Party	275,096	4.59	8
The Force of the Majority	Social Democrat Radical Party	216,355	3.61	8
The Force of the Majority	Total	1,442,567	24.06	43
Broad Front	Democratic Revolution	343,019	5.72	10
Broad Front	Humanist Party	253,787	4.23	5
Broad Front	Equality Party	129,232	2.16	1
Broad Front	Green Ecologist Party	128,629	2.14	1
Broad Front	Citizen Power	87,456	1.46	1
Broad Front	Liberal Party	46,605	0.78	2
Broad Front	Total	988,728	16.49	20
Democratic Convergence	Christian Democratic Party	616,550	10.28	14
Democratic Convergence	Citizen Left	14,358	0.24	0
Democratic Convergence	MAS Region	9,582	0.16	0
Democratic Convergence	Total	640,490	10.68	14
All Over Chile	Progressive Party	199,566	3.33	1
All Over Chile	País	35,469	0.59	0
All Over Chile	Total	235,035	3.92	1
Green Regionalist Coalition	Social Green Regionalist Federation	94,666	1.58	4
Green Regionalist Coalition	Patagonian Regional Democracy	20,575	0.34	0
Green Regionalist Coalition	Total	115,241	1.92	4
Sumemos	Amplitude	61,319	1.02	0
Sumemos	Citizens	30,286	0.51	0
Sumemos	Everybody	2,888	0.05	0
Sumemos	Total	94,493	1.58	0
Patriotic Union		51,348	0.86	0
Revolutionary Workers Party		4,663	0.08	0
Independents		104,717	1.75	1
Total		5,996,710	100.00	155
Valid votes		5,996,710	89.84	
Invalid votes		317,742	4.76	
Blank votes		360,694	5.40	
Total votes		6,675,146	100.00	
Source: Servicio Electoral de Chile

=== Results by regions ===
Pact	Arica y Parinacota			Tarapacá			Antofagasta			Atacama			Coquimbo		
Pact	Seats	Votes		Seats	Votes		Seats	Votes		Seats	Votes		Seats	Votes	
ChV	1	15 161	21,30%	2	38 789	42,99%	2	55 376	34,12%	2	28 221	30,09%	3	66 050	28,44%
LFM	1	15 957	22,42%	1	27 740	30,74%	1	40 391	24,88%	2	33 922	36,17%	2	62 963	27,11%
FA	1	27 327	38,39%	0	11 682	12,95%	1	20 630	12,71%	0	10 738	11,45%	0	21 666	9.33%
CODE	0	2 416	3,39%	0	4 334	4,80%	0	6 369	3,92%	0	4 498	4,80%	1	36 406	15,68%
Others	0	10 325	14,60%	0	7 683	8,52%	1	39 553	24,37%	1	16 411	17,49%	1	45 155	19,44%
Total	3	71 186	100,00%	3	90 228	100,00%	5	162 319	100,00%	5	93 790	100,00%	7	232 240	100,00%
Pact	Valparaíso			Santiago MR			O'Higgins			Maule			Biobío		
Pact	Seats	Votes		Seats	Votes		Seats	Votes		Seats	Votes		Seats	Votes	
ChV	7	243 462	37,99%	22	1 000 021	40,47%	5	121 148	38,13%	6	159 605	43,74%	8	277 900	38,54%
LFM	4	140 074	21,86%	12	552 307	22,35%	2	75 069	23,63%	2	76 966	21,09%	6	194 890	27,03%
FA	3	133 134	20,78%	11	546 554	22,12%	0	23 298	7,33%	1	33 232	9,11%	1	79 358	11,01%
CODE	2	68 185	10,64%	1	187 705	7,60%	1	40 769	12,83%	2	66 379	18,19%	3	114 587	15,89%
Others	0	55 970	8,73%	1	184 497	7,46%	1	57 450	18,08%	0	28 705	7,87%	0	54 301	7,53%
Total	16	640 825	100,00%	47	2 471 084	100,00%	9	317 734	100,00%	11	364 887	100,00%	18	721 036	100,00%
Pact	Araucanía			Los Ríos			Los Lagos			Aysén			Magallanes		
Pact	Seats	Votes		Seats	Votes		Seats	Votes		Seats	Votes		Seats	Votes	
ChV	6	139 754	42,03%	2	50 975	36,58%	4	96 911	36,19%	1	9 874	28,24%	1	16 181	28,51%
LFM	2	80 949	24,34%	2	45 246	32,47%	3	73 653	27,51%	1	10 649	30,46%	1	11 791	20,77%
FA	0	19 821	5,96%	0	17 637	12,66%	1	23 725	8,86%	0	No candidates		1	19 926	35,11%
CODE	1	35 897	10,79%	1	18 077	12,97%	1	36 933	13,79%	1	10 626	30,39%	0	7 309	12,88%
Others	1	56 126	16,88%	0	7 426	5,32%	0	36 530	13,65%	0	3 812	10,91%	0	1 553	2,74%
Total	10	332 547	100,00%	5	139 361	100,00%	9	267 752	100,00%	3	34 961	100,00%	3	56 760	100,00%

== Senate election ==
Revised provisional results.

Distribution by parties (left) and alliances (right)
Party or alliance		Votes	%	Seats		
Party or alliance		Votes	%	Won	Not up	Total
Chile Vamos	National Renewal	349,622	20.98	6	2	8
Chile Vamos	Independent Democratic Union	210,897	12.66	4	5	9
Chile Vamos	Evópoli	67,801	4.07	2	0	2
Chile Vamos	Total	628,320	37.71	12	7	19
The Force of the Majority	Party for Democracy	200,299	12.02	4	3	7
The Force of the Majority	Socialist Party	125,247	7.52	3	4	7
The Force of the Majority	Social Democrat Radical Party	34,448	2.07	0	1	1
The Force of the Majority	Communist Party	20,209	1.21	0	0	0
The Force of the Majority	Total	380,203	22.82	7	8	15
Democratic Convergence	Christian Democratic Party	237,983	14.28	3	3	6
Democratic Convergence	MAS Region	661	0.04	0	0	0
Democratic Convergence	Total	238,644	14.32	3	3	6
Broad Front	Humanist Party	62,223	3.73	0	0	0
Broad Front	Democratic Revolution	38,224	2.29	1	0	1
Broad Front	Liberal Party	28,774	1.73	0	0	0
Broad Front	Citizen Power	28,472	1.71	–	0	0
Broad Front	Equality Party	26,640	1.60	0	0	0
Broad Front	Total	184,333	11.06	1	0	1
Sumemos	Amplitude	62,601	3.76	0	0	0
Sumemos	Citizens	45,636	2.74	0	0	0
Sumemos	Everybody	4,748	0.28	0	0	0
Sumemos	Total	112,985	6.78	0	0	0
All Over Chile	Progressive Party	15,959	0.96	0	0	0
All Over Chile	País	6,970	0.42	0	1	1
All Over Chile	Total	22,929	1.38	0	1	1
Patriotic Union		7,312	0.44	0	0	0
Green Regionalist Coalition	Social Green Regionalist Federation	2,397	0.14	0	0	0
Green Regionalist Coalition	Patagonian Regional Democracy	519	0.03	0	0	0
Green Regionalist Coalition	Total	2,916	0.17	0	0	0
Independents		88,701	5.32	0	1	1
Total		1,666,343	100.00	23	20	43
Valid votes		1,666,343	91.59			
Invalid votes		70,958	3.90			
Blank votes		81,964	4.51			
Total votes		1,819,265	100.00			
Source: Servicio Electoral de Chile

=== Results by region ===
==== Arica and Parinacota ====
Senate Election 2017: Arica and Parinacota
Pact	Votes	%	Party	Candidate	Votes	%	Result
The Force of Majority	22,680	31.7	Socialist	José Miguel Insulza	14,501	20.3	New senator
The Force of Majority	22,680	31.7	For Democracy	Salvador Urrutia	8,179	11.5	
Chile Vamos	17,843	25.0	UDI	José Durana	9,639	13.5	New senator
Chile Vamos	17,843	25.0	National Renewal	Rodolfo Barbosa	7,136	10.0	
Chile Vamos	17,843	25.0	National Renewal	Mirtha Arancibia	1,068	1.5	
Independent				Enrique Lee	14,820	20.7	
Broad Front	13,504	18.9	Liberal	Verónica Foppiano	7,617	10.7	
Broad Front	13,504	18.9	Citizen Power	Rodrigo Díaz Bogdanic	4,192	5.9	
Broad Front	13,504	18.9	Humanist	Claudio Ojeda	1,695	2.4	
All Over Chile	1,796	2.5	Progressive	Pablo Pizarro Bossay (Ind.)	960	1.3	
All Over Chile	1,796	2.5	Progressive	Sandra Zapata (Ind.)	836	1.2	
Democratic Convergence	813	1.1	PDC	Trinidad Parra (Ind.)	813	1.1	
Total valid votes					71,456		
Turnout					74,948	40.4	

==== Tarapacá ====
Senate Election 2017: Tarapacá
Pact	Votes	%	Party	Candidate	Votes	%	Result
The Force of Majority	34,970	37.8	For Democracy	Jorge Soria (Ind.)	31,594	34.2	New senator
The Force of Majority	34,970	37.8	Socialist	Franitza Mitrovic (Ind.)	1,846	2.0	
The Force of Majority	34,970	37.8	Socialist	Astrid Abarca (Ind.)	1,530	1.6	
Chile Vamos	26,865	29.1	UDI	Luz Ebensperger	21,155	22.9	New senator
Chile Vamos	26,865	29.1	National Renewal	Juan Carlos Carreño	4,244	4.6	
Chile Vamos	26,865	29.1	National Renewal	Pamela Boyardi	1,466	1.6	
Independent				Fulvio Rossi	22,406	24.2	Lost re-election
Sumemos	4,333	4.7	Everybody	Gabriel Gurovich	3,440	3.7	
Sumemos	4,333	4.7	Everybody	Lorena Vergara (Ind.)	4,192	0.5	
Sumemos	4,333	4.7	Everybody	Alejandra Guajardo (Ind.)	1,695	0.4	
Broad Front	3,878	4.2	Citizen Power	Rigoberto Rojas (Ind.)	3,878	4.2	
Total valid votes					92,452		
Turnout					96,241	39.6	

==== Atacama ====
Senate Election 2017: Atacama
Pact	Votes	%	Party	Candidate	Votes	%	Result
Democratic Convergence	33,244	34.9	PDC	Yasna Provoste	32,583	34.2	New senator
Democratic Convergence	33,244	34.9	MAS Region	Tomás Pastenes (Ind.)	661	0.7	
Chile Vamos	31,863	33.5	National Renewal	Rafael Prohens	17,574	18.5	New senator
Chile Vamos	31,863	33.5	UDI	Felipe Ward	14,289	15.0	Lost election. Retiring Deputy
The Force of Majority	23,455	24.6	Communist	Lautaro Carmona Soto	16,714	17.6	Lost election. Retiring Deputy
The Force of Majority	23,455	24.6	Social Democrat Radical	Alberto Robles	5,442	5.7	Lost election. Retiring Deputy
The Force of Majority	23,455	24.6	For Democracy	Carolina Peralta	1,299	1.4	
Broad Front	4,175	4.4	Citizen Power	Gloria Guzmán	4,175	4.4	
Green Regionalist Coalition	2,397	2.5	Social Green Regionalist	Jorge Vargas Guerra	1,457	1.5	
Green Regionalist Coalition	2,397	2.5	Social Green Regionalist	Elizabeth Pérez	940	1.0	
Total valid votes					95,134		
Turnout					100,679	43.2	

==== Valparaíso Region ====
Senate Election 2017: Valparaíso Region
Pact	Votes	%	Party	Candidate	Votes	%	Result
Chile Vamos	244,733	36.9	National Renewal	Francisco Chahuán	150,031	22.6	Incumbent re-elected
Chile Vamos	244,733	36.9	National Renewal	Kenneth Pugh (Ind.)	14,241	2.1	New senator
Chile Vamos	244,733	36.9	National Renewal	Carmen Zamora Bravo	4,614	0.7	
Chile Vamos	244,733	36.9	UDI	Andrea Molina	64,668	9.7	Lost election. Retiring Deputy.
Chile Vamos	244,733	36.9	UDI	Francisco Bartolucci	9,513	1.4	
Chile Vamos	244,733	36.9	UDI	Ximena Ramírez	1,666	0.2	
The Force of Majority	182,799	27.5	For Democracy	Ricardo Lagos Weber	74,015	11.2	Incumbent re-elected
The Force of Majority	182,799	27.5	For Democracy	Marco Antonio Núñez	19,791	2.3	Lost election. Retiring Deputy
The Force of Majority	182,799	27.5	Socialist	Isabel Allende Bussi	59,147	8.9	Incumbent elected in new seat
The Force of Majority	182,799	27.5	Socialist	Abel Gallardo	4,510	0.7	
The Force of Majority	182,799	27.5	Social Democrat Radical	Nelson Ávila	23,220	3.5	
The Force of Majority	182,799	27.5	Social Democrat Radical	Josefina Bustamante	2,116	0.3	
Broad Front	96,394	14.5	Democratic Revolution	Juan Ignacio Latorre	30,528	4.6	New senator
Broad Front	96,394	14.5	Equality	Mónica Valencia	26,640	4.0	
Broad Front	96,394	14.5	Humanist	Octavio González Ojeda	22,999	3.5	
Broad Front	96,394	14.5	Citizen Power	Francisco Marín (Ind.)	16,227	2.4	
Democratic Convergence	49,380	7.4	PDC	Ignacio Walker	30,827	4.6	Lost re-election
Democratic Convergence	49,380	7.4	PDC	Aldo Cornejo	16,357	2.5	Lost election. Retiring Deputy.
Democratic Convergence	49,380	7.4	PDC	Oriele Zencovich	2,196	0.3	
Sumemos	42,550	6.4	Amplitude	Lily Pérez	35,493	5.3	Lost re-election
Sumemos	42,550	6.4	Amplitude	Julián Ugarte (Ind.)	2,411	0.4	
Sumemos	42,550	6.4	Amplitude	Pedro Sariego	1,505	0.2	
Sumemos	42,550	6.4	Amplitude	Ana Cuadros Matamala	1,247	0.2	
Sumemos	42,550	6.4	Amplitude	Alberto Nuñez Ponce	1,213	0.2	
Sumemos	42,550	6.4	Amplitude	Oscar Rementería (Ind.)	681	0.1	
Independent				Gaspar Rivas	29,423	4.4	Lost election. Retiring Deputy.
All Over Chile	11,356	1.7	Progressive	Francisco Coloane (Ind.)	5,070	0.8	
All Over Chile	11,356	1.7	Progressive	Pamela Jiménez Gallardo	3,602	0.5	
All Over Chile	11,356	1.7	Progressive	Héctor Pérez Meneses (Ind.)	2,674	0.4	
Patriotic Union	7,312	1.1	Patriotic Union	Luis Aravena Egaña	3,571	0.5	
Patriotic Union	7,312	1.1	Patriotic Union	Vlademir Venegas	2,298	0.4	
Patriotic Union	7,312	1.1	Patriotic Union	Berta Caro	1,443	0.2	
Total valid votes					663,937		
Turnout					725,514	47.2	

==== Maule ====
Senate Election 2017: Maule
Pact	Votes	%	Party	Candidate	Votes	%	Result
Chile Vamos	154,294	41.7	National Renewal	Juan Castro Prieto (Ind.)	54,433	14.7	New senator
Chile Vamos	154,294	41.7	National Renewal	Rodrigo Galilea	28,268	7.6	New senator
Chile Vamos	154,294	41.7	National Renewal	Macarena Pons (Ind.)	3,229	0.9	
Chile Vamos	154,294	41.7	UDI	Juan Antonio Coloma Correa	58.595	15.8	Incumbent re-elected
Chile Vamos	154,294	41.7	UDI	Yasna Cancino (Ind.)	7,760	2.1	
Chile Vamos	154,294	41.7	UDI	Francisca Concha (Ind.)	2,009	0.5	
Democratic Convergence	68,287	18.4	PDC	Ximena Rincón	38,697	10.5	New senator
Democratic Convergence	68,287	18.4	PDC	Andrés Zaldívar	29,590	7.8	Lost re-election
The Force of Majority	55,124	14.9	Socialist	Álvaro Elizalde	30,900	8.3	New senator
The Force of Majority	55,124	14.9	Socialist	Viviana Landaeta	4,426	1.2	
The Force of Majority	55,124	14.9	Socialist	Carlos Villalobos	3,264	0.9	
The Force of Majority	55,124	14.9	For Democracy	Jorge Tarud	14,109	3.8	Lost election. Retiring Deputy.
The Force of Majority	55,124	14.9	For Democracy	Liliana Caro	1,332	0.4	
The Force of Majority	55,124	14.9	For Democracy	Valeria Jenoveva (Ind.)	1,093	0.3	
Sumemos	45,636	12.3	Citizens	Andrés Velasco	38,867	10.5	
Sumemos	45,636	12.3	Citizens	Paula Romero Neira	2,164	0.6	
Sumemos	45,636	12.3	Citizens	Alberto Martínez Moya (Ind.)	1,817	0.5	
Sumemos	45,636	12.3	Citizens	Grace Salazar (Ind.)	1,520	0.4	
Sumemos	45,636	12.3	Citizens	Esteban Bravo Moreno (Ind.)	1,268	0.3	
Broad Front	36,998	10.0	Liberal	Alfredo Sfeir (Ind.)	21,157	5.7	
Broad Front	36,998	10.0	Humanist	Wilfredo Alfsen	3,482	0.9	
Broad Front	36,998	10.0	Humanist	Jimena Arias	3,145	0.8	
Broad Front	36,998	10.0	Humanist	Marta Guerra Medina	2,604	0.7	
Broad Front	36,998	10.0	Democratic Revolution	María Eugenia Lorenzini	4,816	1.3	
Broad Front	36,998	10.0	Democratic Revolution	Yuri Sepúlveda (Ind.)	1,794	0.5	
All Over Chile	9,787	2.6	País	María Romero (Ind.)	3,503	0.9	
All Over Chile	9,787	2.6	País	Gustavo Ruz	3,467	0.9	
All Over Chile	9,787	2.6	Progressive	Sandra Alfaro	2,817	0.8	
Total valid votes					370,126		
Turnout					410,430	48.3	

==== Araucanía ====
Senate Election 2017: Araucanía
Pact	Votes	%	Party	Candidate	Votes	%	Result
Chile Vamos	141,125	41.8	Evópoli	Felipe Kast	63,601	18.84	New senator
Chile Vamos	141,125	41.8	Evópoli	Carmen Gloria Aravena	4,200	1.24	New senator
Chile Vamos	141,125	41.8	National Renewal	José García Ruminot	33,456	9.91	Incumbent re-elected
Chile Vamos	141,125	41.8	National Renewal	Germán Becker Alvear	25,576	7.58	Lost election. Retiring Deputy.
Chile Vamos	141,125	41.8	UDI	Gustavo Hasbún	11.751	3.48	Lost election. Retiring Deputy.
Chile Vamos	141,125	41.8	UDI	José Villagrán	2,541	0.75	
Democratic Convergence	76,119	22.55	PDC	Francisco Huenchumilla	38,185	11.31	New senator
Democratic Convergence	76,119	22.55	PDC	Fuad Chahín	37,934	11.24	Lost election. Retiring Deputy.
The Force of Majority	49,938	14.79	Socialist	Flor Domínguez	2,961	0.88	
The Force of Majority	49,938	14.79	For Democracy	Jaime Quintana	34,285	10.16	Incumbent re-elected
The Force of Majority	49,938	14.79	For Democracy	Alberto Pizarro	5,950	1.76	
The Force of Majority	49,938	14.79	For Democracy	Claudia Palma	3,247	0.96	
The Force of Majority	49,938	14.79	Communist	Patricia Coñoman	3,495	1.04	
Broad Front	28,298	8.38	Humanist	Aucán Huilcamán (Ind.)	11,787	3.49	
Broad Front	28,298	8.38	Humanist	Diego Ancalao (Ind.)	6,119	1.81	
Broad Front	28,298	8.38	Humanist	Juan Ortiz	3.655	1,08	
Broad Front	28,298	8.38	Humanist	Gabriela Meléndez	3,173	0.94	
Broad Front	28,298	8.38	Humanist	Gloria Mujica	2,082	0.62	
Broad Front	28,298	8.38	Humanist	Lucía Tormen	1,482	0.44	
Independent				Rojo Edwards	22,052	6.53	Lost election. Retiring Deputy.
Sumemos	20,051	5.94	Amplitude	Eduardo Díaz	13,390	3.97	
Sumemos	20,051	5.94	Amplitude	Ema Vidal	3,795	1.12	
Sumemos	20,051	5.94	Amplitude	Tatiana Rudolph	1,717	0.51	
Sumemos	20,051	5.94	Amplitude	Juan Ramírez	1,149	0.34	
Total valid votes					337,583		
Turnout					373,476	44.04	

==== Aysén ====
Senate Election 2017: Aysén
Pact	Votes	%	Party	Candidate	Votes	%	Result
Chile Vamos	11,606	32.52	UDI	David Sandoval	7,320	20.51	New senator
Chile Vamos	11,606	32.52	National Renewal	Pilar Cuevas	4,168	11.68	
Chile Vamos	11,606	32.52	National Renewal	Ana Verdugo	118	0.33	
The Force of Majority	11,253	31.52	Socialist	Camilo Escalona	2,178	6.10	
The Force of Majority	11,253	31.52	For Democracy	Ximena Órdenes (Ind.)	5,405	15.14	New senator
The Force of Majority	11,253	31.52	Social Democrat Radical	Luperciano Muñoz (Ind.)	3,670	10.28	
Democratic Convergence	10,818	30.30	PDC	Paz Foitzich	5,743	16.09	
Democratic Convergence	10,818	30.30	PDC	Eduardo Cruces	4,939	13.84	
Democratic Convergence	10,818	30.30	PDC	Hernán Vodanovic (Ind.)	4,939	13.84	
Broad Front	1,087	3.04	Democratic Revolution	Alejandro Barrientos	664	1.86	
Broad Front	1,087	3.04	Democratic Revolution	Jenny Rivera	423	1.18	
Green Regionalist Coalition	518	1.45	Patagonian Regional Democracy	Carlos Pérez Osorio	271	0.76	
Green Regionalist Coalition	518	1.45	Patagonian Regional Democracy	Antonella Muñoz (Ind.)	247	0.69	
Sumemos	416	1.16	Everybody	Raúl Vargas	161	0.45	
Sumemos	416	1.16	Everybody	Carlos Chávez (Ind.)	255	0.71	
Total valid votes					35,698		
Turnout					38,030	40.0	

== Regional Boards election ==
Revised provisional results.

Party or alliance		Votes	%	Seats
Chile Vamos UDI – PRI – Ind.	RN – Ind.	1,066,089	18.34	72
Chile Vamos UDI – PRI – Ind.	Evópoli and Ind.	237,857	4.09	5
Chile Vamos UDI – PRI – Ind.	Total	1,303,946	22.43	77
Chile Vamos UDI – PRI – Ind.	UDI – Ind.	945,290	16.26	52
Chile Vamos UDI – PRI – Ind.	PRI and Ind.	158,980	2.74	4
Chile Vamos UDI – PRI – Ind.	Total	1,104,270	19.00	56
United for Decentralization	PDC and Ind.	580,582	9.99	44
United for Decentralization	PS and Ind.	521,050	8.96	26
United for Decentralization	Total	1,101,632	18.95	70
For a Just and Decentralized Chile	PPD and Ind.	429,719	7.39	26
For a Just and Decentralized Chile	PCCh and Ind.	270,241	4.65	11
For a Just and Decentralized Chile	PRSD and Ind.	164,891	2.84	8
For a Just and Decentralized Chile	IC and Ind.	9,892	0.17	1
For a Just and Decentralized Chile	MAS Region and Ind.	1,391	0.02	1
For a Just and Decentralized Chile	Total	876,134	15.07	47
Broad Front	Democratic Revolution and Ind.	302,812	5.21	10
Broad Front	Humanists plus Ind.	199,282	3.43	6
Broad Front	Equality for the Peoples	153,735	2.64	2
Broad Front	Liberals plus Ind.	19,653	0.34	0
Broad Front	Independents	11,237	0.19	0
Broad Front	Total	686,719	11.81	18
Ecologist and Citizen Front	Power/Green Ecologist Party	247,229	4.25	2
For All Chile	PRO + Ind.	185,618	3.19	2
For All Chile	País + Ind.	25,279	0.43	0
For All Chile	Total	210,897	3.63	2
Green Regionalist Coalition	Regionalist Federation and Ind.	64,885	1.12	2
Green Regionalist Coalition	Regional Democracy and Ind.	19,539	0.34	0
Green Regionalist Coalition	Total	84,424	1.45	2
Sumemos	Amplitude and Ind.	64,873	1.12	2
Sumemos	Citizens and Ind.	13,743	0.24	0
Sumemos	Everybody and Ind.	124	0.00	0
Sumemos	Total	78,740	1.35	2
Let's Refound Chile	Patriotic Union	57,007	0.98	0
Integration for Development	For Regional Integration	9,259	0.16	1
Revolutionary Workers Party		2,927	0.05	0
Independents		49,585	0.85	1
Total		5,812,769	100.00	278
Valid votes		5,812,769	87.13	
Invalid votes		365,005	5.47	
Blank votes		493,623	7.40	
Total votes		6,671,397	100.00	
Source: Servicio Electoral de Chile

== Electoral pacts and political parties ==
Some Christian Democratic Party members believed the party would fare better running on its own, while the socialists and radicals advanced toward an agreement that did not include it. The party's National Council instructed its leadership to hold talks with parties outside the Nueva Mayoría, including Ciudadanos and the PRO, led respectively by Andrés Velasco and Marco Enríquez-Ominami, as it sought not to run alone in the parliamentary elections.

== See also ==
- List of female Chilean presidential candidates
