= Alejandro Guillier =

Chilean journalist and politician

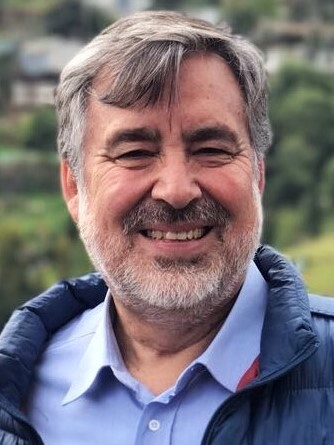
- In office 11 March 2014 – 11 March 2022
- Preceded by: José Antonio Gómez
- Succeeded by: Dissolution of the circunscription

Personal details
- Born: 5 March 1953 (age 73) La Serena, Chile
- Party: Social Democratic Radical Party (2014–2018)
- Spouse: María Cristina Fraga

Alejandro René Eleodoro Guillier Álvarez (born 5 March 1953) is a Chilean sociologist, television and radio journalist, and independent politician. He was the senator of the 2nd District of Antofagasta and ran as the 2017 presidential candidate of the New Majority.

Guillier ran in the New Majority primary for the 2017 election and was the coalition's standard bearer in the 2017 presidential elections to replace term-limited president Michelle Bachelet. Among others, he faced former PPD president Ricardo Lagos before the latter's withdrawal from the contest.

Polling showed him to be competitive against Chile Vamos candidate Sebastián Piñera, although his support slipped in the run up to the election and after a series of splits between the traditional left coalition block.

Gullier is a freemason and a member of the Valparaíso Parliamentary Lodge since 2014.

== Early life and family ==
He was born on 5 March 1953 in La Serena. He is the son of Alejandro René Guillier Ossa and María Raquel Álvarez Monterrey.

He is married to María Cristina Farga and is the father of three children.

=== Professional career ===
He studied at the Liceo de Hombres No. 1 of Antofagasta. He later entered the Catholic University of the North, where he studied Sociology while simultaneously pursuing a degree in Journalism. In 1977, he qualified as a sociologist with the thesis “Marginalidad y estructura social en América Latina: Hacia un replanteamiento de la problemática de la marginalidad e integración.” In 1980, he graduated as a journalist with the thesis “Un periodismo para nuestro tiempo.”

In 1983, he obtained a Master’s degree in Social Sciences, with a specialization in Development Studies, from the Latin American Faculty of Social Sciences (FLACSO) in Ecuador.

In 1976, he joined the Catholic University of the North as a lecturer and later served as head of the Sociology program. He also taught in the special degree regularization program at the University of Tarapacá.

In 1988, he became a professor at the School of Journalism of the Diego Portales University and served as its vice-dean between 1996 and 1998. In 2008, he taught at the School of Journalism of the University of Chile in the field of International Journalism. He later joined the School of Journalism of the Mayor University as an adviser and, in 2013, as its director.

He began his professional career as a reporter at the newspaper La Estrella del Norte (Antofagasta) and later worked as a correspondent for Antofagasta for Revista Hoy and for the radio program El Diario de Cooperativa. In 1984, he moved to Santiago and joined Revista Hoy as a staff writer. He also worked at Radio Chilena as host of the program Primera Plana.

In 1991, he began his television career as morning editor at Canal 11. The following year, he joined Televisión Nacional de Chile (TVN) as a news anchor and host of the programs Informe Especial and Medianoche. In 1999, he returned to Chilevisión as anchor of the main newscast, Director of News, and panelist on Tolerancia Cero. Between 2009 and December 2011, he worked at TVN’s 24 Horas News Channel. He later hosted the newscast Hora 20 on La Red until March 2013.

In parallel, he hosted programs on Radio Futuro and ADN Radio, and in 2001, he served as Director of the News Division of the newspaper El Metropolitano.

== Political career ==
He began his political activity as a student, serving as president of the student council at the Liceo de Hombres No. 1 of Antofagasta.

In October 2000, he was appointed by President Ricardo Lagos as a member of the Bicentennial Advisory Committee of the Presidential Advisory Commission for the Bicentennial of the Republic of Chile.

In 2013, he announced his intention to run for the Senate of Chile. Supported by the Radical Social Democratic Party, he ran as an independent candidate for the Second Senatorial Circumscription (Antofagasta Region) in the parliamentary elections of 17 November 2013. He was elected with 61,911 votes, representing 37.08% of the valid votes cast.

On 7 January 2017, he was proclaimed presidential candidate of the Radical Social Democratic Party, and on 9 April 2017, he was nominated as presidential candidate by the Socialist Party of Chile. Supported by additional political forces, including the Communist Party of Chile, Citizen Left and the Broad Social Movement, he ran in the 2017 Chilean presidential election representing the electoral coalition La Fuerza de la Mayoría.

On 11 June 2017, he presented the main guidelines of his presidential campaign at the Teatro Caupolicán, focusing on education, decentralization, and social security. In early November of the same year, he presented his government program.

In the first round of the presidential election, he obtained 22.70% of the valid votes, advancing to the runoff. In the second round, held on 19 December 2017, he received 45.43% of the votes and was defeated by Sebastián Piñera.

In the November 2021 parliamentary elections, he decided not to seek re-election for the Third Senatorial Circumscription (Antofagasta Region).
