= All Over Chile =

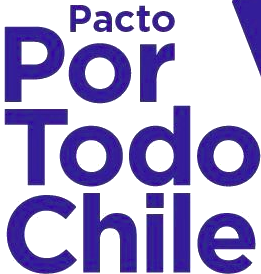
Party logo.

All Over Chile (Spanish: Por Todo Chile) was a Chilean political coalition that held one senator and one deputy in the LV legislative period of the Chilean Congress.

It brought together the Progressive Party and País for the 2017 Chilean general election.
