= Citizen Power (political party) =

Citizen Power Poder Ciudadano
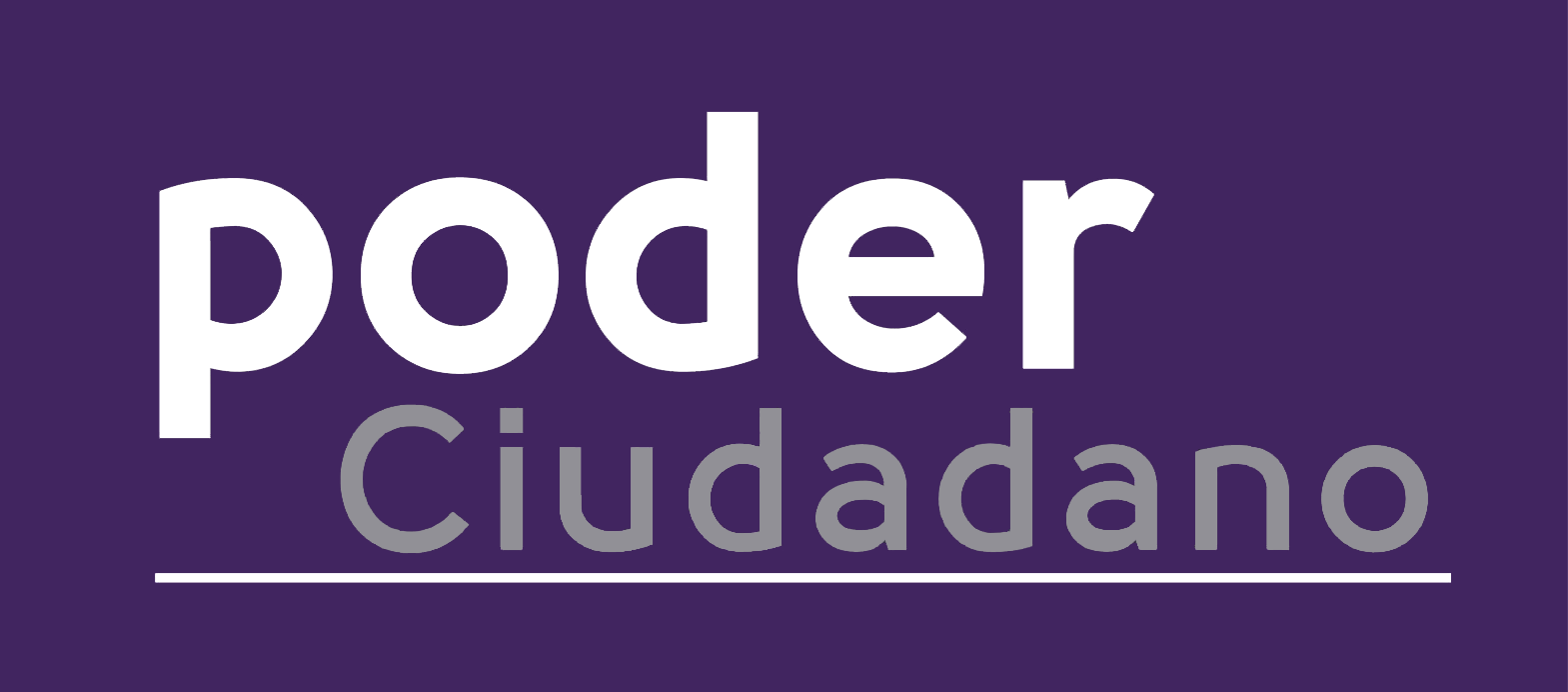
- President: Karina Oliva
- Founded: 20 March 2015
- Dissolved: 20 January 2019
- Merged into: Commons
- Coalition: Broad Front
- Membership (2017): 3014
- Ideology: Socialism of the 21st century
- Political position: Left-wing
- Colours: Purple
- Chamber of Deputies: 1 / 155
- Senate: 0 / 38

Website
- partidopoder.cl

Citizen Power (Poder Ciudadano) was a Chilean left-wing political party, founded in 2015. It was created by former supporters of Michelle Bachelet, Marcel Claude, Franco Parisi and Alfredo Sfeir, who were presidential candidates in the 2013 elections.

In 2017, the party joined a new leftist coalition called Broad Front, which competed in the presidential and parliamentary elections that year.

On September 27, 2018, Autonomous Left merged with Poder Ciudadano, the latter saying via Twitter to "...create a new party of feminist, popular and democratic left..." The new party was called Commons.

== Presidential candidates ==
The following is a list of the presidential candidates supported by Power. (Information gathered from the Archive of Chilean Elections).

- 2017: Beatriz Sánchez (lost)
