= El Mostrador =

Chilean online newspaper

- El primer diario digital de Chile
- Type: Newspaper
- Format: Online
- Owner: La Plaza S.A.
- President: Germán Olmedo Acevedo
- Founded: 1 March 2000; 26 years ago
- Political alignment: Pluralism
- Language: Spanish
- Headquarters: Av Providencia #223; Providencia, Santiago
- Website: www.elmostrador.cl

El Mostrador is a Chilean online newspaper, founded on 1 March 2000. Its current president is Germán Olmedo Acedvedo and its director is Federico Joannon Errázuriz.

== History ==
El Mostrador was launched on 1 March 2000 and is Chile's first exclusively digital newspaper. On 20 November 2001, part of its journalistic content was paywalled, but in 2007 it was reopened, completely free of charge.

On 25 May 2010 the newspaper launched an online television channel, «El Mostrador TV», that was transmitted for a digital television signal on channels 24, 26, 27, 28, 30 and 33 within the ring of Américo Vespucio Avenue in Santiago.

== Organization ==
El Mostrador is an ideologically pluralist journal owned by La Plaza S.A. Its president is Germán Olmedo Acevedo, while its vice president is Federico Joannon Errázuriz. The journalistic director is Héctor Cossio López and the deputy director is Iván Weissman.

== Content ==
The El Mostrador website is organized into the following sections:

- News: National and international news, editorials, and letters to the director, among others
- Markets: News from the economic field
- TV: Analysis, opinion, and cultural billboard in video format
- Culture+City: News from the cultural field
- Online Life: News from the technological field and the Internet

== Incidents ==
On 19 March 2010 El Mostrador published a report that linked the newly appointed governor of Bío Bío Province, José Miguel Steigmeier, with the inner circle of Paul Schäfer, ex-leader of Villa Baviera, and with supposed participation in money laundering. Faced with this information, Interior Minister Rodrigo Hinzpeter summoned Steigmeier to La Moneda Palace that same day, deciding after the meeting to revoke his appointment to govern Bío Bío.

On 22 April 2010 Mirko Macari left the directorship of El Mostrador due to his appointment as director of the newspaper La Nación. However, pressures from the Independent Democratic Union (UDI) made the government of Sebastián Piñera reverse the decision the following day. The return of Macari to his original post at El Mostrador was made public through a press release from the electronic medium published on 23 April, under the consideration that the previous withdrawal was a voluntary act and that the journalist satisfied "fully the standards of pluralism, independence, and quality that characterize El Mostrador."
