= Comunes (Chile) =

Chilean political party

Comunes Comunes
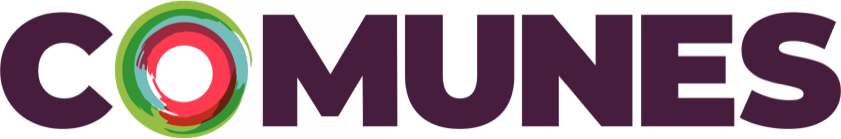
- President: Marco Velarde
- Founded: 20 January 2019
- Dissolved: 1 July 2024
- Merger of: Citizen Power; Autonomous Left
- Merged into: Broad Front
- Headquarters: Concha y Toro 19, Santiago, Santiago, Chile
- Coalition: Broad Front
- Membership (2020): 15,111
- Ideology: Socialism of the 21st century Autonomism; Feminism
- Political position: Left-wing
- National affiliation: Broad Front; Apruebo Dignidad
- Colours: Purple, Yellow, Pink and Green

Website
- https://www.partidocomunes.cl/

Comunes (Spanish: Common Ones) was a Chilean left-wing political party, founded in 2019 by the merger between the Citizen Power party and the Autonomous Left (Izquierda Autónoma) movement.

Among its notable members were Emilia Schneider, the first transgender president of the University of Chile Student Federation (FECH).

== Authorities ==
=== Deputies ===
Name	Region	District	Period
Camila Rojas	Region of Valparaíso	7	2018-2022 / 2022-2026
Claudia Mix	Santiago Metropolitan Region	8	2018-2022 / 2022-2026

== Presidential candidates ==
The following is a list of the presidential candidates supported by Commoners. (Information gathered from the Archive of Chilean Elections).

- 2021: Gabriel Boric (won)

== Electoral history ==
=== Congress election ===
Election year	Chamber of Deputies			Senate			Status
Election year	# Votes	% Votes	Seats	# Votes	% Votes	Seats	Status
2021	207,607	3.84	6 / 155	172,054	3.69%	0 / 50	TBA
