= Ramón Galleguillos =

Chilean politician

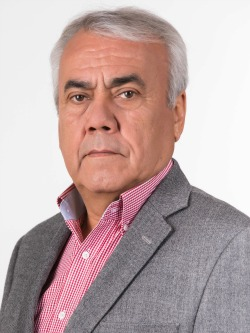

Ramón Galleguillos is a Chilean politician. A member of the National Renewal, he served in the Chamber of Deputies of Chile.
