= Alberto Mayol =

Chilean sociologist, political analyst, and politician

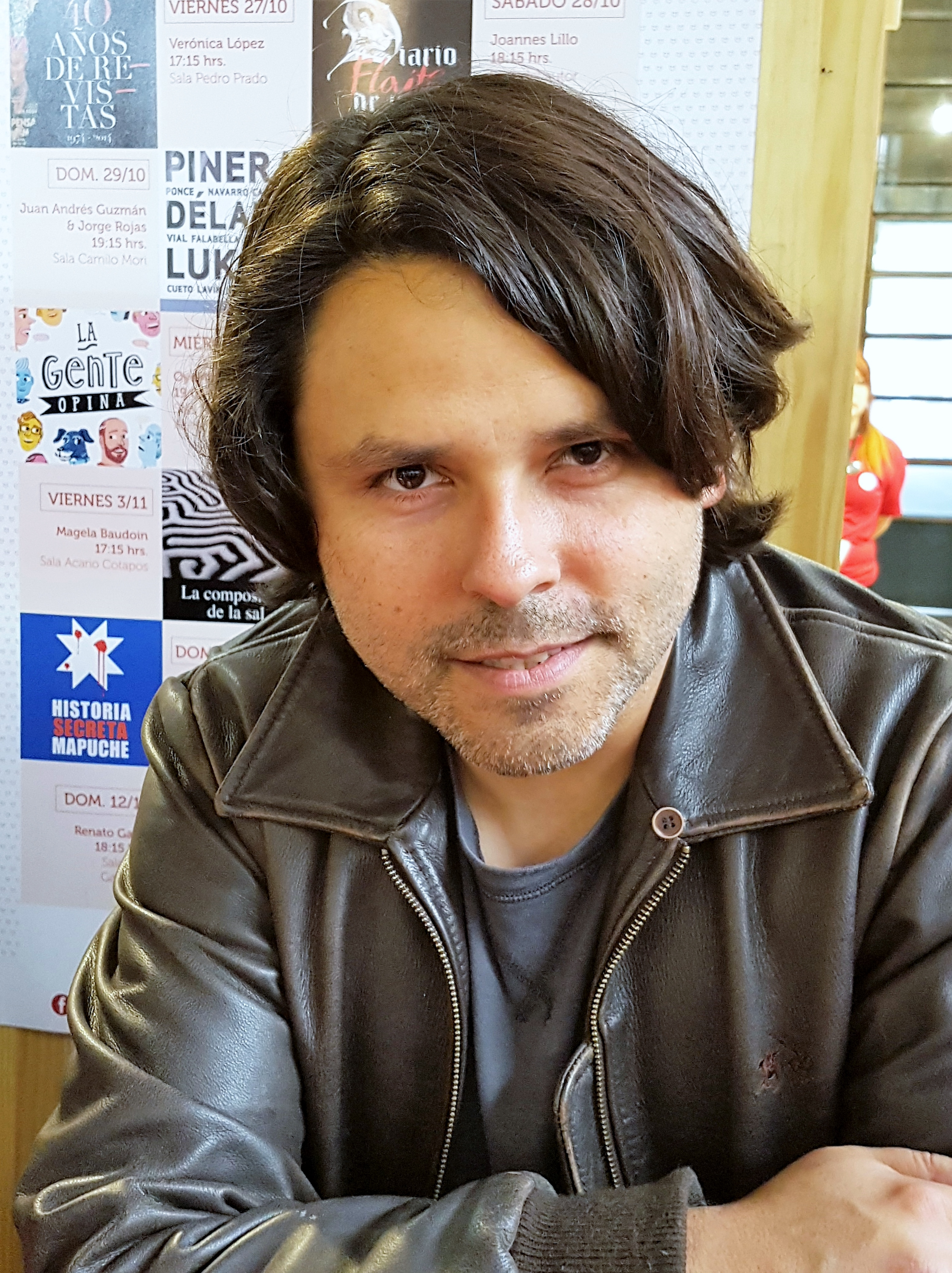
- November 2017
- Born: Alberto Manfredo Mayol Miranda; 8 July 1976 (age 50); Santiago, Chile
- Education: Universidad de Alicante
- Occupations: Sociologist, political analyst, writer
- Parents: Manfredo Mayol Durán (father); Mariana Miranda (mother)
- Awards: Santiago Municipal Literature Award (2013)
- Website: www.albertomayol.cl

Alberto Manfredo Mayol Miranda (born 8 July 1976) is a Chilean sociologist, political analyst, and politician. An independent researcher, and author of several works on social sciences, politics, and culture, he was a candidate in the Broad Front 2017 presidential primary.

An opinion poll, conducted by La Segunda in 2017, ranked Mayol in fifth place among the most admired public intellectuals nationwide.

== Family and studies ==
The son of Manfredo Mayol Durán, a well-known journalist during the period of the military dictatorship, and Mariana Miranda, Alberto Mayol studied sociology at the University of Chile's Faculty of Social Sciences, where he graduated in 1998. Then he worked toward a master's in political science at his alma mater, which he completed in 2000, and, in parallel, a degree in aesthetics at the Catholic University, which he received in 2001. In 2005, he completed a Master of Advanced Studies in sociology at the Complutense University of Madrid. Currently, he is a doctoral student at the Universidad de Alicante, Spain.

== Academic career ==
Mayol became a professor at the University of Chile in 2007, in the Faculties of Social Sciences, Law, Philosophy, and Humanities. At the Institute of Public Affairs he served as coordinator in the Research Center in Social Structure and researcher in the Transdisciplinary Laboratory in Social Practices and Subjectivity. He was an advisor to the Observatory of Books and Reading, where he directed research projects funded by the National Council of Culture and the Arts (CNCA).

Between 2013 and 2023, he belonged to the Department of Management and Public Policies of the Faculty of Administration and Economics of the University of Santiago.

In 2013 his essay El derrumbe del modelo received the Santiago Municipal Literature Award.

His report on the funding of science in Chile, "Do the Fondecyt competitions have a political undertone?", was questioned by other academics in columns published in the newspaper El Mostrador, in which they reproached him for a lack of methodological rigor. Mayol responded to these criticisms through the same medium.

== Public life ==
=== Political career ===
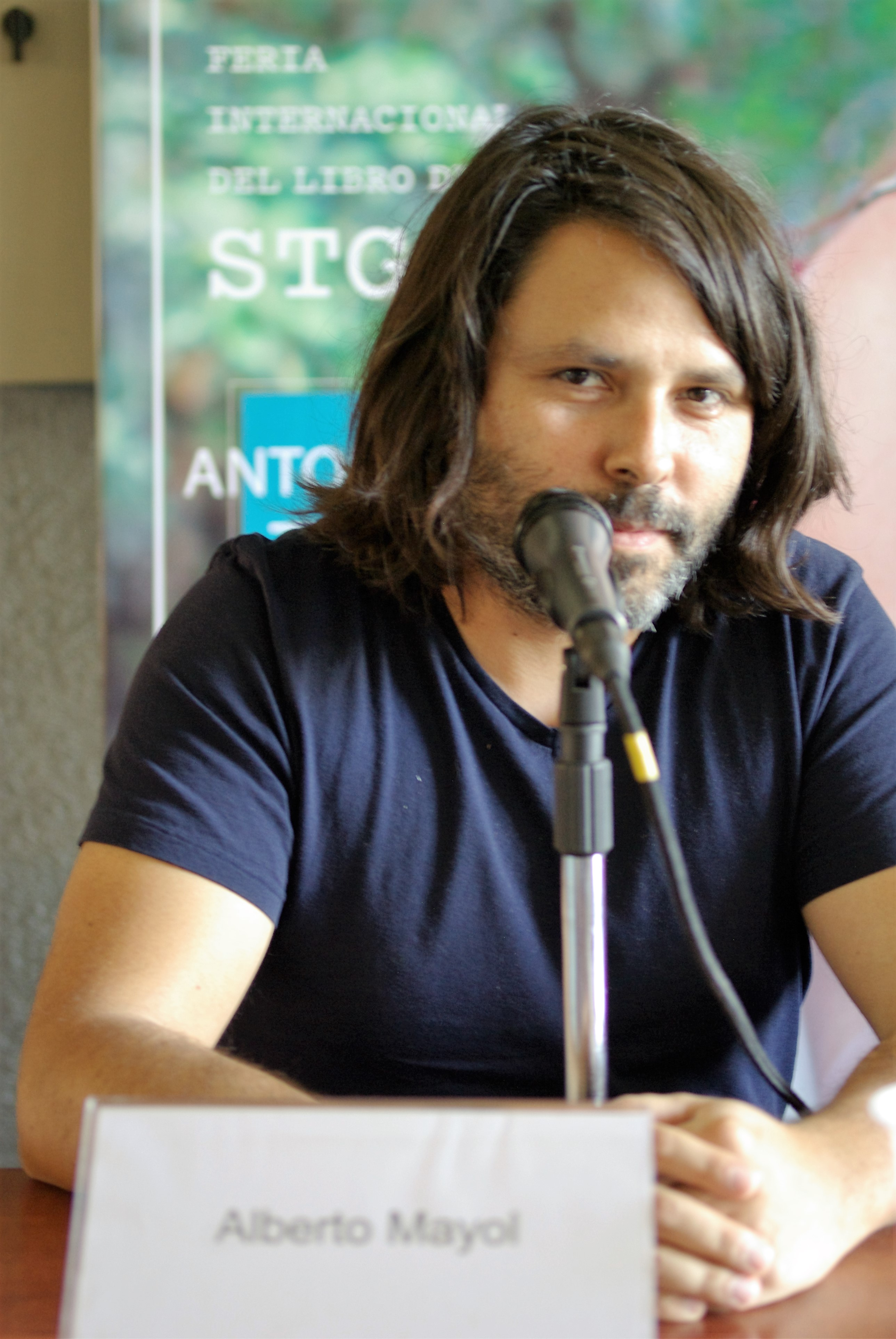
Mayol in October 2016

In March 2017, Mayol announced his candidacy to participate in the Broad Front primaries, which were to elect the representative of that coalition for the 2017 presidential election in Chile. Mayol received support from the New Democracy, Allendist Socialism, and SOL movements, as well as from the Christian Left, Equality, Pirate, and Ukamau parties. In the election of 2 July of that year, Mayol received 106,265 votes, equivalent to 32% of the votes received by the Broad Front, losing to Beatriz Sánchez.

On 15 August 2017, the Broad Front revoked Mayol's parliamentary candidacy for the 10th district after a polemical audio message sent to the parliamentary candidate of the same district, Natalia Castillo. Mayol allegedly verbally abused Castillo and spoke about a "dirty job" by Democratic Revolution deputy Giorgio Jackson. However, days later, his candidacy was confirmed, occupying a quota of the Equality Party. Mayol obtained 25,299 votes, equivalent to 5.8%, which were insufficient to be elected.

=== Media ===
He has appeared as a panelist on several radio and television programs, such as Patio de Los Naranjos on Mega, El semáforo and La República de las Letras on Radio University of Chile, Ciudadanos on CNN Chile, Palabras sacan Palabras on Radio Futuro, and Vía Pública on 24 Horas.

His columns have appeared in electronic journals, such as Diario U Chile, El Mostrador, the "Estadística de Bolsillo" section of the weekly newspaper The Clinic, El Dínamo, and El Periodista.

== Written work ==
His work focuses on issues of social movements, politics, culture, social structure, social unrest, social theory, culture and research methodology. He has published the following books:

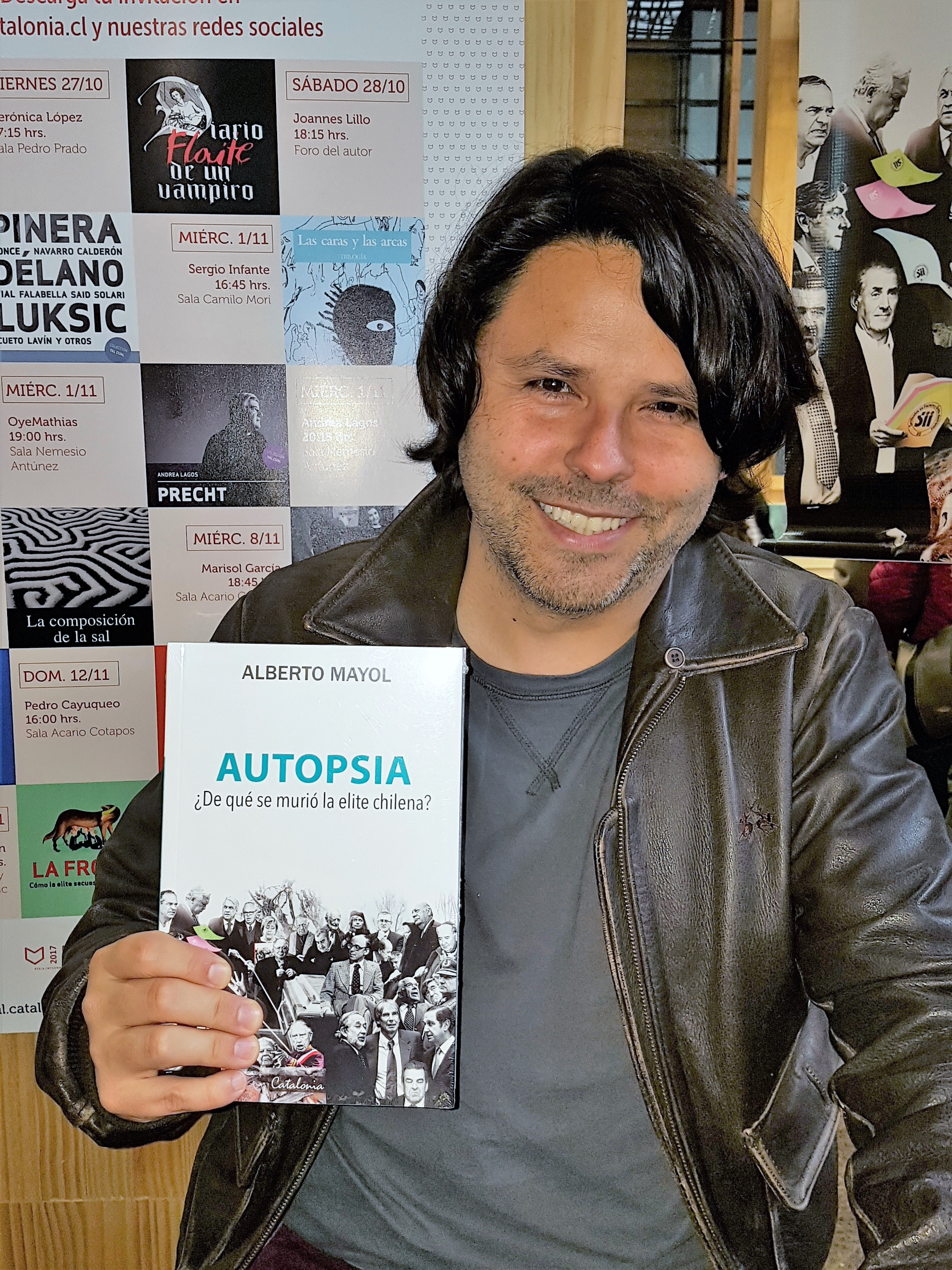
Mayol with his book Autopsia at FILSA 2017

- 2008: Métodos de investigación social: una aproximación desde las estrategias cuantitativas y cualitativas (Ed. Catholic University of the North). Written with Carlos Calderón Carvajal, Andrés Music Cáceres, and Paulina Salinas Meruane.
- 2012: No al lucro: de la crisis del modelo a la nueva era política (Debate). Analyzes the power structure in Chilean society, the political impact of neoliberalism in terms of depoliticization and the processes of transformation associated with social movements since 2011.
- 2013: El derrumbe del modelo: la crisis de la economía de mercado en el Chile contemporáneo (LOM). 31 June 2012. Arising from the Vox Popvli... Vox Dei exhibition, presented at a National Meeting of Entrepreneurs in November 2011, where he declares and analyzes the failure of the Chilean economic model. The book examines the Chilean model in its economic, political, and cultural dimensions as the origin of the malaise that culminated in the social movements of 2011 and the ensuing crisis.
- 2013: El Chile profundo: modelos culturales de la desigualdad y sus resistencias (Liberalia). Written with Carla Azócar Rosenkranz and Carlos Azócar Ortiz. It describes the Chilean cultural model, and analyzes its relationship with the high levels of inequality in this society.
- 2015: Economía política del fracaso: la falsa modernización del modelo neoliberal (El Desconcierto). Written with the political scientist José Ahumada. The book proposes to transfer the limit of questioning to the Chilean economic model, starting from the following hypothesis: the Chilean economic model has been widely questioned. The majority of the challenges, however, have avoided crossing a frontier: all recognize in the growth and modernization of their economic structures a positive consequence of their work.
- Autopsia: ¿de qué se murió la elite chilena? (in Spanish). Catalonia. 2016.
- El abismo existencial de Occidente (in Spanish). Catalonia. 2023.
