= País =

País País
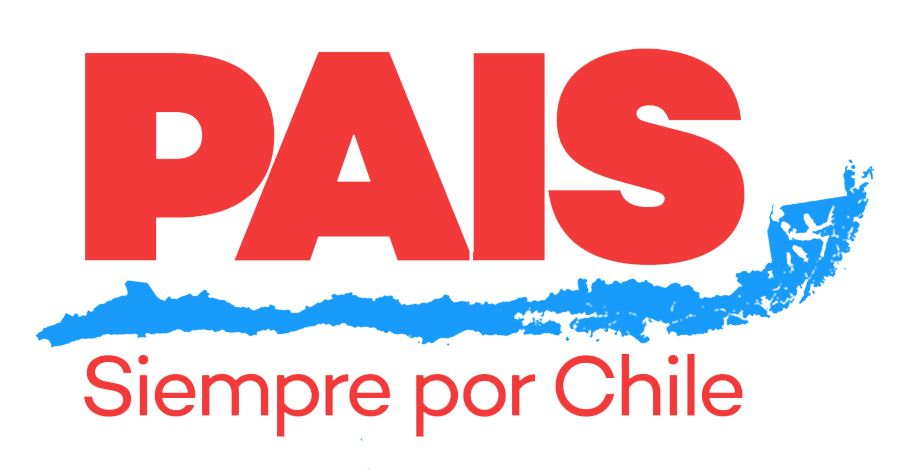
- Leader: Alejandro Navarro
- President: Jonatan Diaz Herrera
- Founded: 2016
- Dissolved: 2017
- Ideology: Socialism
- Political position: Left-wing

Website
- www.partidopais.cl

The party País was a leftist political party in Chile founded by Alejandro Navarro, a Senator formerly a member of the MAS Region party, supporting his candidacy for President in 2017.

País was presented in Santiago on 3 September 2016; on the 10th of the same month it was founded in the city of Concepción.

One of its founders was Chilean senator Alejandro Navarro.

Among the party's proposals was the elimination of the Chilean pensions system sistema de AFP as well as to achieve free education at all levels. It was part of the All Over Chile alliance.

On 22 May 2017, the party delivered 8,500 signatures of new members from six different regions to the Central Electoral Board Servicio Electoral in order to legalise the party on those areas; at the same time, it was announced that Alejandro Navarro would run in the presidential race.

Because of some issues with one of the regions, the party was finally legalised in 5 zones: Región de Tarapacá, Antofagasta, Maule, Biobío and Araucanía.

After their first General Assembly on 6 August 2017, Alejandro Navarro´s presidential candidacy was confirmed and legalised and the candidates for Parliament and Local Governments were announced. The new leadership of the party was also ratified.

== Presidential candidates ==
The following is a list of the presidential candidates supported by the País Party. (Information gathered from the Archive of Chilean Elections).

- 2017: Alejandro Navarro (lost)
