= Carolina Goic =

Chilean politician (born 1972)

Carolina Goić
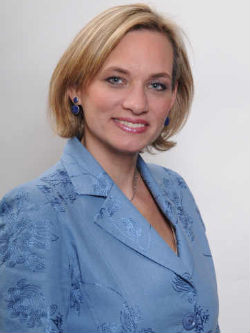

President of the Christian Democratic Party
- In office 2 April 2016 – 20 November 2017
- Preceded by: Jorge Pizarro
- Succeeded by: Myriam Verdugo

Member of the Senate
- In office 11 March 2014 – 11 March 2022
- Preceded by: Pedro Muñoz Aburto
- Succeeded by: Alejandro Kusanovic
- Constituency: 15th Circumscription

Member of the Chamber of Deputies of Chile
- In office 11 March 2006 – 11 March 2014
- Preceded by: Pedro Muñoz Aburto
- Succeeded by: Juan Morano Cornejo
- Constituency: Magallanes Region (60th District)

Personal details
- Born: 20 December 1972 (age 53) Puerto Natales, Chile
- Spouse: Christian Kirk Miranda
- Children: Two
- Relatives: Alejandro Goic Karmelic
- Education: Pontifical Catholic University of Chile
- Occupation: Politician
- Profession: Social worker

Carolina Nevenka Goić Borojević (born 20 December 1972) is a Chilean politician who served as president of the Chilean Christian Democratic Party (PDC) from 2016 to 2017.

She is a former Senator and former deputy for Magallanes, which includes the communities of Rio Verde, Laguna Blanca, Cape Horn, Porvenir, Primavera, Punta Arenas, San Gregorio, Timaukel and Torres del Paine. She was the PDC's nominee for president of Chile in 2017.

== Biography ==
She was born on 20 December 1972 in Santiago, Chile. She is the daughter of Pedro Danilo Goic Karmelic, an agronomist engineer and former National Vice President of the Christian Democratic Party, and María Juana Boroevic. She is the niece of Monsignor Alejandro Goic Karmelic, Bishop Emeritus of Rancagua and former President of the Chilean Episcopal Conference.

She is married to Christian Mauricio Kirk Miranda, who served as Director of the National Tourism Service (SERNATUR) in the Magallanes Region and Chilean Antarctica. She is the mother of two daughters: Catalina and Alejandra.

=== Professional career ===
She completed her primary education at Colegio Cardenal Spellman and her secondary education at Colegio Pedro de Valdivia (Institución Teresiana). She pursued higher education at the Pontifical Catholic University of Chile, where she qualified as a social worker. She later obtained a Master’s degree in Economics at the same university.

Between 2000 and 2002, she worked as a support professional at the National Women's Service (SERNAM) in the Magallanes Region. At the same time, she worked as an analyst for the Regional Planning Secretariat (SERPLAC) in the same region.

== Political career ==
She entered the Catholic University of Chile, where graduated as a social worker. Then she obtained magister degree in economics at the Catholic University of Chile.

She is married to Christian Kirk Miranda, a marine biologist by profession and photographer, and served as director of the National Tourism Service (Sernatur) in the Magallanes and Chilean Antarctic region. She is the mother of two daughters: Catalina and Alejandra.

Carolina Goic was elected president of the Christian Democratic Party in April 2016, following the resignation of Jorge Pizarro.

On 11 March 2017 Carolina Goic was proclaimed by the Christian Democratic Party as presidential candidate in the Chilean general election. On 29 April 2017, the PDC decided not to participate in a New Majority primary, breaking away from the coalition after 28 years. On 11 May 2017 the PDC officially registered her candidacy before the Electoral Service of Chile ("Servel"). She obtained 5.88% of the vote, the worst result for a Christian Democrat running for president in a general election in Chilean history, and subsequently resigned as president in November 2017, being replaced by Myriam Verdugo.

Goic is a member of the Inter-American Dialogue.

== See also ==
- List of female Chilean presidential candidates
