= Sumemos =

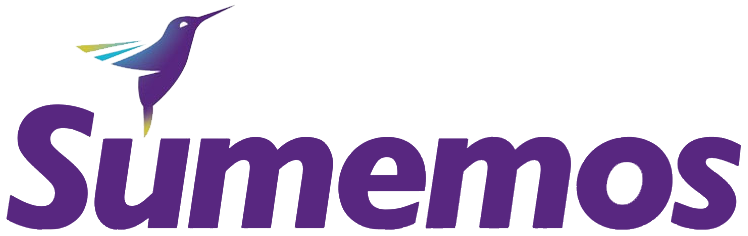
- Founded: 13 January 2016
- Dissolved: 19 December 2017
- Headquarters: Santiago de Chile
- Ideology: Liberalism
- Political position: Centre
- Deputies: 1 / 120
- Senate: 1 / 38

Sumemos (Spanish for "Let's add") was a Chilean political coalition that brought together two parties and a liberal centrist political movement. It was officially presented on January 13, 2016, in an event held in the building of the former National Congress of Chile.

== History ==
It was founded with the name Future Sense (Spanish: Sentido Futuro, SF). Its origins go back to September 28, 2015, when Amplitude announced the formation of a political coalition of liberal center next to the movements Citizens and Liberal Network (Spanish: Red Liberal), facing the municipal elections of 2016 in which it was presented under the name of "Chile wants Amplitude» (Spanish: Chile Quiere Amplitud) with 41 candidates for mayor and 289 for councilors. They have also indicated that they intend to present their own presidential candidate for the 2017 elections.

By April 2017, while the two parties that make up the coalition (Amplitude and Citizens) registered their collectivities in a minimum of three continuous regions or eight discontinuous regions to maintain their legal status, several parliamentary candidates were presented, such as Luis Larraín (district 10) and Sacha Razmilic (district 8) for deputies, and Lily Pérez, Jorge Errázuriz (constituency 6) and Andrés Velasco Brañes for senators. On that occasion they also announced that they expect to obtain 3 seats in the Senate and 6 to 8 in the Chamber of Deputies.

== Composition ==
It is formed by Amplitude and Citizens, parties emerged as divisions and groups of independents near Chile Vamos and the New Majority. Also part of Sense Future is the political movement Liberal Network (Red Liberal), led by Sacha Razmilic, and Everybody (Todos), led by Gabriel Gurovich.

The leaders of the parties that make up the coalition are:

Party	President
Amplitude	Lily Pérez
Citizens	Andrés Velasco Brañes
Everybody	Gabriel Gurovich

In February 2016 an electoral committee was created that defined the electoral strategy and candidacies for mayor and councilors presented by the coalition in the municipal elections. The commission is composed of Alex Olivares, Sebastián Sichel and Carolina Mayol (Citizens); Joaquín Godoy, Eugenio Aguiló and Carlos Lobos (Amplitude); And Sacha Razmilic, Nicolás Ibáñez and Emilia González (Liberal Network).
