= Autonomous Left =

Chilean political party

Autonomist Left Izquierda Autonomista
- Leaders: Francisco Figueroa
- Founded: 2008
- Dissolved: 20 January 2019
- Ideology: Autonomism; Libertarian socialism Democratic socialism Latinamericanism; Feminism
- Political position: Left-wing

The Autonomous Left was a Chilean political movement which was a founding member of the Broad Front on 21 January 2017. One year later, the movement merged into the party Commons.

== Notable members ==
- Gabriel Boric (until 2016)
- Jorge Sharp (until 2016)
- Francisco Figueroa
