= Amplitude (political party) =

Political party in Chile

Amplitude Amplitud
- President: Joaquín Godoy Ibáñez
- Founded: 7 January 2014
- Dissolved: 11 May 2018
- Split from: National Renewal
- Headquarters: Avenida Libertador Bernardo O'Higgins 1370, Of. 307, Santiago, Chile
- Youth wing: Juventud Amplitud
- Ideology: Liberalism; Classical liberalism
- Political position: Centre-right
- National affiliation: Sumemos
- Chamber of Deputies: 2 / 120
- Senate: 1 / 38

Website
- www.amplitud-chile.cl

Amplitude was a Chilean classical-liberal political party founded in January 2014. Although initially grouped as centre-right independents that had no militancy in the parties of the Alliance, the party's leanings were later grouped with the "liberal center" and the party was associated with other movements outside the coalition before its dissolution.

== History ==
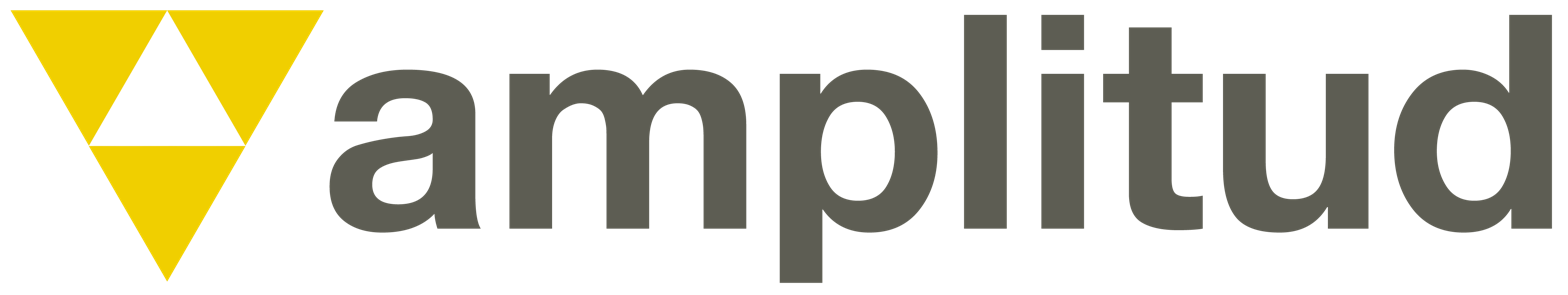
Amplitude logo from 2015 until 3 June 2017

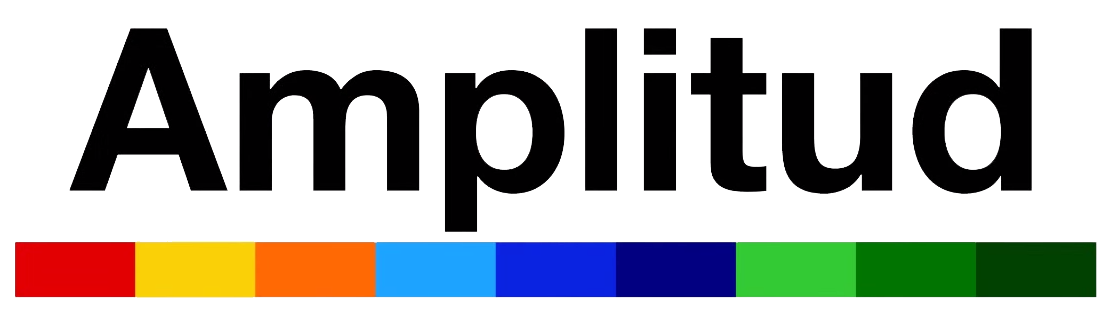
Amplitude logo from 2014 until 16 May 2015

On 7 January 2014, deputies Karla Rubilar, Pedro Browne and Joaquín Godoy Ibáñez decided to leave their party, the National Renewal party, due to ideological differences. Among the reasons that were given for leaving was the party's refusal to support the closing of the Penal Cordillera (a special prison for military people that were condemned for human rights violations under the Pinochet dictatorship), its lack of support for the allowance of civil unions, and its position on economic and educational policies.

The same day, Rubilar, Browne, and Ibáñez presented a manifesto entitled "Amplitud", which outlined a new political movement. The positions detailed included the rejection of human rights violations committed during the dictatorship of Augusto Pinochet and support for political reforms, including the reform of the electoral system and the vote of Chileans living abroad.

On 20 January, Senator Lily Pérez joined the movement, having resigned from National Renewal four days earlier. Later that year, on 28 March, former-senator Carlos Cantero and regional councilor of Antofagasta Constantino Zafirópulos joined the party.

Its initial intentions were to remain within the Alliance, forming a political party with Political Evolution and other center-right organizations, and presenting its own candidate for the eventual presidential primary in 2017. However, its path changed towards the end of 2014 when Amplitude made a political-reforms agreement with Public Force (Fuerza Pública, later Citizens), a political movement led by Andrés Velasco, and Liberal Network (Red Liberal). Lily Pérez had expressed the party's intention to hold a presidential primary between herself and Velasco.

On 7 March 2015, Amplitude elected its provisional board of directors; Joaquin Godoy won the presidency with 89.8% of the vote and general secretary Peter Browne won with 80.9%. The new board officially took office on 15 March 2015.

On 15 May 2015, founding member Deputy Karla Rubilar quit Amplitude, citing political differences. The next day the General Council was held in the former National Congress building in Santiago, where a new emblem was presented and it was decided to initiate proceedings for registration as a political party.

On 28 September 2015, Amplitude announced the formation of a liberal political coalition, joining with Citizens and Liberal Network to face the municipal elections of 2016. In January 2016 the coalition was named Future Sense (Spanish: Sentido Futuro).

== Presidential candidates ==
The following is a list of the presidential candidates supported by Amplitude. (Information gathered from the Archive of Chilean Elections).

- 2017: Sebastián Piñera
