= Citizens (Chilean political party) =

Political party in Chile

Citizens Ciudadanos
- President: María Ignacia Gómez
- Founder: Andrés Velasco Brañes
- Founded: 7 October 2013
- Headquarters: Monseñor Muller Nº 15, Depto. 325, Providencia, Santiago, Chile
- Youth wing: Juventud Ciudadanos
- Ideology: Social liberalism Progressivism; Technocracy; Reformism
- Political position: Centre to centre-left
- National affiliation: New Social Pact (2021); Constituent Unity (2020-2021); Sumemos (2015–2017)

Website
- www.partidociudadanos.cl

Citizens (Spanish: Ciudadanos pronounced [sjuðaˈðanos], called Public Force between 2013 and 2015) was a Chilean political party founded in 2013, with members comprising militants and independents of the center and center-left whose beliefs did not align with New Majority or Chile Vamos. Party militants mainly came from the Christian Democratic Party and the Party for Democracy.

== Ideology ==
One of the ideological axes of Citizens was the realization of political reforms, mainly to the binominal system that governs in the country. Other elements of the party platform included term limits for political officeholders and equal marriage.

== History ==
=== Public Force (2013-2015) ===
The Public Force (Spanish: Fuerza Pública) movement was officially launched on October 7, 2013, through an event held at Concha Palace in the Concha y Toro neighborhood of Santiago de Chile. It was headed by the former Minister of Finance, Andrés Velasco Brañes. With this political movement, Velasco sought to capitalize on the 13% of the vote that he won in the presidential primaries of the New Majority in 2013.

Among the members of Fuerza Pública were Andrés Velasco Brañes, Rafael Guilisasti, Juan José Santa Cruz, Pablo Halpern, José Joaquín Brunner, Eduardo Vergara, Mariana Aylwin and Pilar Armanet.

In the parliamentary elections of 2013, Public Force supported Sebastián Iglesias and Eduardo Vergara as candidates for Deputies, and Soledad Alvear as candidate for the Senate, all of whom were defeated.

On August 15, 2015, the movement held a vote, in which 99.17% of the participants agreed that Public Force should become a political party, with Alex Olivares to serve as the new national coordinator.

=== Citizens (2015-) ===
On September 28, 2015, Public Force announced the formation of a political coalition with Amplitude and Red Liberal (Spanish: Liberal Network), facing the municipal elections of 2016. This coalition was officially registered under the name Future Sense (Spanish: Sentido Futuro) on January 13, 2016.

On October 21, the group decided to change its name. The name "Citizens" triumphed 297 votes over the 285 votes received for the name "Plural." On December 31, 2015, the extract of the party's constitution was published in the Official Gazette of the Republic of Chile, starting the period for collecting signatures and achieve the legality by the Electoral Service. On July 26 they presented their first signatures to be officially registered in the regions of Antofagasta, Los Ríos, and Aysén.

On August 30, 2016, Servel approved the legal registration of the party in the Region of Aysén on September 6; however, the authority rejected the registration in the regions of Antofagasta and Los Ríos due to errors found in the signatures collected. After resubmitting the signatures a second time, Servel accepted the registration in those two regions on October 6, 2016. On December 11, 2016, the new party leadership was elected, headed by Andrés Velasco Brañes.

On April 27, 2017, the Chilean Electoral Service announced that the party would be dissolved for failing to meet the minimum of necessary members in three contiguous or eight discontinuous regions to maintain its legal status. The party appealed, and filed a complaint to the Electoral Qualification Tribunal (Spanish: Tribunal Calificador de Elecciones, Tricel) to reverse the determination. On June 27, 2017, the Tricel resolved to accept Citizens claim.

On February 3, 2022, the Chilean Electoral Service announced the party would be dissolved because it did not receive at least 5% of the votes in the 2021 parliamentary elections to maintain its legality. Its members in the Chamber of Deputies thereafter sat as independents.

== Presidential candidates ==
The following is a list of the presidential candidates supported by Citizens. (Information gathered from the Archive of Chilean Elections).

- 2017: none
- 2021: Yasna Provoste (lost)
