= Karol Cariola =

Chilean politician

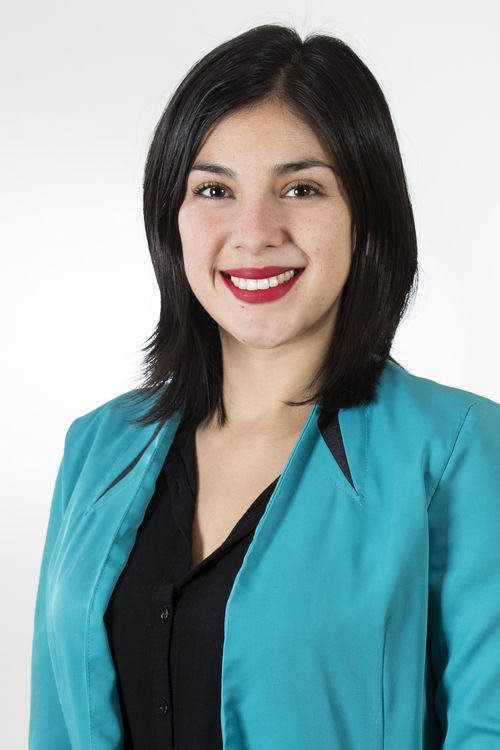
- Cariola in 2013

Member of the Senate
- Incumbent
- Assumed office 11 March 2026
- Constituency: 6th Circumscription

President of the Chamber of Deputies
- In office 15 April 2024 – 24 March 2025
- Preceded by: Ricardo Cifuentes
- Succeeded by: Gaspar Rivas

Member of the Chamber of Deputies
- In office 11 March 2014 – 11 March 2026
- Constituency: 9th District

General Secretary of the Communist Youth of Chile
- Incumbent
- Assumed office November 2011
- Preceded by: Oscar Aroca

President of the University of Concepción Student Federation
- In office 2010–2011
- Preceded by: Jose Piña
- Succeeded by: Guillermo Petersen

Personal details
- Born: Karol Aída Cariola Oliva; 1 April 1987 (age 39) Santiago, Chile
- Party: Communist Party of Chile
- Education: University of Concepción

Karol Aída Cariola Oliva (born 1 April 1987) is a Chilean politician, and former president of the Federación de Estudiantes de la Universidad de Concepción (University of Concepción Student Federation) for 2010. She was elected General Secretary of the Juventudes Comunistas de Chile, abbr. JJ.CC., (the youth wing of the Communist Party of Chile) at the organizations XIII Congress held in October 2011. Cariola is the second woman to hold this post in the Communist Youth of Chile after the late communist leader Gladys Marin (1941–2005).

On August 4, 2013, Cariola emerged as the leading congressional candidate in the New Majority coalition's primary elections for the electoral district of Recoleta and Independencia. Subsequently, during the Chilean general election held on November 17, 2013 she won 38.47% of the votes and became the deputy-elect for the 19th electoral Santiago district of Recoleta and Independencia. She commenced to serve a four-year term in the Chilean Congress on 11 March 2014. On March 11, 2022, it was agreed that as part of a rotation agreement, she would become Speaker of the Chilean Chamber of Deputies starting 21 October 2022.

In December 2021 Cariola was elected by party members to join the central committee of the Communist Party of Chile.

== Student movement for public education ==
Cariola was elected General Secretary of the JJ.CC. amidst one of the most significant mass social mobilization in recent Chilean history – referred by the media as the Chilean Winter. This mobilization saw students across Chile refuse to return to school or university, from April 2011 to the end of the academic year, in protest and to demand an end to the privatization of education. Cariola has stated that the student mobilization, protests and strikes had a political nature and she refuted the statement made by the Chilean government spokesperson Andrés Chadwick that the CONFECH (Chile's Confederation of Student Unions) has been taken over by extremist elements.

In an interview with CNN Chile Cariola stated that it was a grave mistake to refer to the student movement in that manner:

"I think our country is at a historic moment, that it is necessary to generate structural changes….We have had a process that has led this country to develop a new consciousness. Chile today is not the same that it was 6 months ago, there is an eagerness to generate changes and the need to do so."

== Parliamentary candidature and general elections ==
Cariola has stated that "Chile and its people have to draft a new constitution" and has said that within the Nueva Mayoria coalition she intends to fight for a Constituent Assembly to oversee a change to the existing Chilean Constitution. Cariola - in line with the leader of the Nueva Mayoria, Michelle Bachelet - believes that the Chilean Constitution is illegitimate because it was introduced in the absence of political democracy by the Pinochet regime on September 11, 1980. Cariola also states that if she wins a seat in the Chilean Chamber of Deputies she will work to see a fair labour code implemented with an institution to protect workers' rights and the automatic unionization of all workers in or entering the workforce.

=== New Majority coalition's primary elections ===
The primary elections for the New Majority coalition commenced on August 4, 2013. These parliamentary primaries were set to determine which two candidates from the Nueva Mayoria pact in a given electorate will stand for the Chilean elections in November 2013. In the primary election for the 19th Santiago electorate of Recoleta-Independencia Cariola received the highest number of votes from the local constituents.

District	Electoral Division	Candidate	Party	Votes	%	Results
19	Recoleta	Óscar Santelices	PPD	1439	18,3	Candidate
19	Recoleta	María Francisca Zaldívar	PDC	1206	15,3	
19	Recoleta	Francisco Díaz	PS	1125	14,3	
19	Recoleta	Karol Cariola	PCCh	4100	52,1	Candidate

=== Chilean general elections 2013 ===
- 2013 Chilean general election: deputy for the 19thelectoral Santiago district of Recoleta and Independencia

Candidate	Pact	Party	Votes	%	Results
Karol Cariola Oliva	New Majority	PCCh	35.604	38,47	Deputy
Claudia Nogueira	Alliance	UDI	22.992	24,84	Deputy
Óscar Santelices Altamirano	New Majority	PPD	13.929	15,05	
Eduardo Cuevas Rosselot	Alliance	RN	6.934	7,49	
Roberto Cofré Pinto	New Constitution for Chile	Ind.	4.214	4,55	
Galvarino Sazo Bolbaran	If You Want It, Chile Changes	PRO	3.005	3,24	
Juan Francisco Valdés Valencia	If You Want It, Chile Changes	PRO	2.424	2,61	
Claudio Méndez Rojas	Humanist Party	HP	2.051	2,21	
Eduardo Patricio Purán Purán	Humanist Party	HP	1.378	1,48	

Chilean general elections 2017

- 2017 Chilean general election: deputy for the 9th electoral district of Recoleta, Independencia, Renca, Quinta Normal, Lo Prado, Huechuraba, Conchalí, Cerro Navia.

Candidate	List	Party	Votes	%	Results
Karol Cariola Oliva	La Fuerza de la Mayoría	PCCh	50 449	14.95	Elected
Érika Olivera de la Fuente	Chile Vamos	IND-RN	30 784	9.13	Elected
Sebastián Keitel Bianchi	Chile Vamos	IND-EVO	30 233	8.96	Elected
Maite Orsini Pascal	Frente Amplio	RD	21 850	6.48	Elected
Jorge Durán Espinoza	Chile Vamos	RN	19 485	5.78	Elected
Claudia Nogueira Fernández	Chile Vamos	UDI	19 444	5.76	
Cristina Girardi Lavín	La Fuerza de la Mayoría	PPD	16 183	4.8	Elected
Eddy Roldán Cabrera	Independiente	IND	15 040	4.46	
Gonzalo Navarrete Muñoz	La Fuerza de la Mayoría	PPD	13 421	3.98	
Cristián Bowen Garfias	Convergencia Democrática	DC	12 031	3.57	
Jorge Rosales Vargas	Frente Amplio	PEV	9087	2.69	
Katherine Martorell Awad	Chile Vamos	RN	8688	2.58	
Carolina Mora Saa	Convergencia Democrática	DC	7546	2.24	
Karina Delfino Mussa	La Fuerza de la Mayoría	PS	7510	2.23	
Pilar Durán Baronti	La Fuerza de la Mayoría	PS	7.131	2.11	
Catalina Vidal Méndez	Frente Amplio	PH	5642	1.67	
Erick Coñoman Garay	Frente Amplio	PODER	4886	1.45	
Rodrigo Albornoz Pollmann	Convergencia Democrática	DC	4856	1.44	
Boris Barrera Moreno	La Fuerza de la Mayoría	PCCh	4347	1.29	Elected

== Speaker-elect of Chilean Chamber of Deputies ==
On 11 March 2022, a coalition consisting of eleven parties and independents voted to have Carlola serve as president of the Chilean Chamber of Deputies from 22 October 2022 to 30 June 2023.

== Criticism ==
Critics point to her explicit support for the governments of Fidel Castro and Hugo Chavez.

== See also ==
- Communist Party of Chile
- New Majority (Chile)
- 2006 student protests in Chile
- 2011 Chilean protests
