= Vlado Mirosevic =

Chilean political scientist and politician

His Excellency Vlado Mirosevic
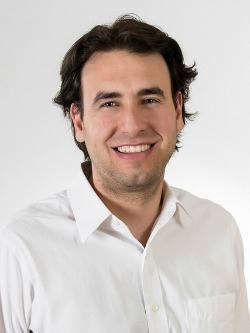
- Vlado Mirosevic in 2018

Member of the Senate
- Incumbent
- Assumed office 11 March 2026
- Constituency: 1st Circumscription

President of the Chamber of Deputies
- In office 7 November 2022 – 24 July 2023
- Preceded by: Raúl Soto
- Succeeded by: Ricardo Cifuentes

Member of the Chamber of Deputies
- In office 11 March 2014 – 11 March 2026
- Preceded by: Nino Baltolu
- Constituency: 1st District

President of ChilePrimero
- In office 16 October 2010 – 26 January 2013
- Preceded by: Alberto Precht

President of the Liberal Party of Chile
- In office 26 January 2013 – 26 January 2016
- Preceded by: Party established
- Succeeded by: Luis Felipe Ramos

Personal details
- Born: Vlado Mirosevic Verdugo; 23 May 1987 (age 39) Arica, Chile
- Party: Liberal Party of Chile (from 2013); ChilePrimero (es) (2009–2013)
- Relatives: Milovan Mirošević (cousin)
- Education: Central University of Chile
- Occupation: Political scientist
- Profession: Deputy
- Committees: Commission of Extreme Zones, the Commission of International Relations, the Commission of Interior Affairs and Decentralization, Commission of Ethics
- Website: vlado.cl

Vlado Mirosevic Verdugo (born 23 May 1987) is a Chilean political scientist and politician who served as President of the Chamber of Deputies of Chile in 2022 to 2023. He is one of the founders of the Liberal Party of Chile, and served as its president until January 2016. He has since 2014 been serving as deputy for District 1, the Region of Arica and Parinacota.

== Biography ==
Vlado Mirosevic was born in Arica in 1987, and has Croatian ancestry from his mother's side of the family. He studied at "Collegio Andino" in his hometown. He served as the leader of the student council during middle school and later as president of the Federation of High School students of Arica and Parinacota (FESAP) in 2003 and 2004.

Mirosevic studied political science at the Central University of Chile in Santiago and did afterwards study a master in digital journalism in the University Mayor (Universidad Mayor) Mirosevic published investigations about international agencies such as the United Nations Economic Commission for Latin America (Comision Economica para America Latina - CEPAL) and published documents about public youth politics and social politics. Mirosevic is also the co-author of the book "Donde esta el relato" from the institution Democracy y Mercado, which is a book written by 11 young people below the age of 35 who were all interested in the political life of Chile.

In 2006 and 2007 Mirosevic was the director of the digital newspaper El Morrocotudo of Arica and was in particular dedicated to the promotion of the citizen journalism and collaborated the process with the expansion of "The Net of citizen newspapers of Chile" (la Red de Diarios Ciudadanos de Chile) a group that was founded with the newspaper Morrocotudo and which has created citizen newspapers in 14 regions of the country.

In 2013, Mirosevic founded the Liberal Party of Chile, and was its president until early 2016.

== Political career ==
Mirosevic was formerly a part of the ChileFirst party, which was founded in 2007 by a group of dissidents from the coalition led by Fernando Flores Labra. In the final months of 2008 he stated his interest to present a candidature as deputy of Arica and Parinacota. However, the party inscribed him as candidate for district 19 which included the areas Indenpendencia and Recoleta in Santiago. He obtained approximately 5% of the votes and did not manage to get elected.

The 16 October 2010 Mirosevic was elected as president of ChilePrimero by its national assembly. The party changed its name from ChileFirst to the Liberal Party of Chile in 2013 - and Liberal Party of Chile became known as a party based on a social liberal ideology for which Mirosevic continued as president until January 2016. He was succeeded by Luis Felipe Ramos.

In the parliamentary elections of 2013, Vlado ran as deputy candidate for district 1 which includes the communes of Arica, Camarones, General Lagos y Putre. He represented Liberal Party of Chile and was a part of the pact "If you want it, Chile changes" (si tú quieres Chile cambia). He achieved 21,35% of the votes and was the only one who achieved a seat in the congress from his party as well as from the electoral alliance he was a part of. He assumed office on 11 March 2014. In the Chamber of Deputies he is further serving in the Commission of Extreme Zones, the Commission of International Relations, the Commission of Interior Affairs and Decentralization, and the Commission of Ethics.

== Legislative work ==
While serving in the Chamber of Deputies, Vlado Mirosevic has presented 48 bills (proposals). One of them was about a project on the water quality in Chile and aimed to make Chilean legislation on the area reach international standards through making the Ministry of Health regulate the water quality according to those international standards.

Mirosevic presented, with the independent deputies Giorgio Jackson and Gabriel Boric, a bill to reduce 50% of the parliamentary diet and establish an ethical limit for its establishment. That proposal meet with opposition from other members of the Chamber of Deputies.

Regarding transparent financing of political campaigns, Mirosevic presented together with Giorgio Jackson a proposal, which was approved in the Chamber of Deputies, to eliminate so-called reserved contributions (Spanish: aportes resevados), which meant that companies could donate big sums to political parties. The aim was to change the form of financing political parties in Chile, thus terminating the secrecy in the process of financing in Chilean politics. The Chamber of Deputies also approved the proposal of Mirosevic and Jackson to prohibit businesses and legal organisations from donating money for political campaigns, thus only allowing economic contributions from individual citizens.

During Mirosevic’s time in congress he presented a project regarding free software. He proposed to reduce the high costs which the state allocated to buy software patents and instead allow the state to promote the use of free software. This project was blocked deputy Daniel Farcas acting on request by the Microsoft lobby. Mirosevic denounced the lobby publicly in a wide report in the newspaper El Mercurio, which became a scandalous case for Farcas.

== Cultural work ==
When Mirosevic assumed office as deputy in March 2014 he transformed his parliamentary office into a cultural centre in Arica called "The House of Regionalism" (Spanish: "La casa del Regionalismo"). During his time in the congress he created libraries for public use and opened his personal library to the public.

Milosevic has also created art galleries and open spaces to promote artists in the regions.

== Political ideology ==
Mirosevic is inspired by social liberalism and supports federalism. He is recognised in general by the Chilean population as "a liberal commoner from the province". He political platform is situated in the political centre as a secular and reformist politician.

As the current president of the Liberal Party of Chile, he expressed: “What we want to do is to revive the authentic liberalism from the 19th century, with younger, more modern traits and liberal cultural values which make more sense in these contemporary times"

== Electoral history ==
=== Parliamentary elections of 2009 ===
- Parliamentary elections for deputy of the 19th district (Independencia and Recoleta)

Candidate	Electoral coalition	Party	Votes	%	Result
Patricio Hales Dib	Concertación and Juntos Podemos for more Democracy	PPD	39.126	38,12	Deputy
Claudia Nogueira Fernández	Coalition for Change	UDI	38.297	37,31	Deputy
Gonzalo Durán Baronti	Concertación and Juntos Podemos for more Democracy	PS	13.329	12,99	
Vlado Mirosevic Verdugo	Coalition for Change	ILB	5.148	5,02	
Jorge Pavez Urrutia	Clean Chile. Vote Happy.	ILD	2.485	2,42	
Leonora Zúñiga Fuentes	New Majority for Chile	PH	1.775	1,73	
Cristopher González Castillo	New Majority for Chile	ILC	1.305	1,27	
Damaris Hernández Muñoz	Clean Chile. Vote Happy.	MAS	1.177	1,15	

=== Parliamentary elections of 2013 ===
- Parliamentary elections for deputies for district 1 (Arica, Camarones, General Lagos and Putre)

Candidate	Pact	Party	Votes	%	Result
Luis Rocafull López	New Majority	PS	15.012	22,41	Deputy
Orlando Vargas Pizarro	New Majority	PPD	14.484	21,62	
Vlado Mirosevic Verdugo	If You Want It, Chile Changes	PL	14.237	21,25	Deputy
Nino Baltolu Rasera	Alliance	UDI	10.584	15,80	
Ximena Valcarce Becerra	Alliance	RN	5.483	8,18	
Enrique Lee Flores	Independent	IND	3.904	5,82	
Eduardo Piñones Piñones	If You Want It, Chile Changes	PRO	2.124	3,17	
Aníbal Díaz González	New Constitution for Chile	IGUAL	1.139	1,70	
