= Richard Israel =

Richard Israel may refer to:

- Richard J. Israel (rabbi) (1929–2000), American rabbi
- Richard J. Israel (politician) (1930–2022), American attorney and politician

== See also ==
- Ricardo Israel (born 1950), Chilean lawyer and academic
