= New Constitution for Chile =

New Constitution for Chile Nueva Constitución para Chile
- Leader: Roxana Miranda; Alfredo Sfeir
- Founded: 3 August 2013
- Headquarters: Santiago de Chile
- Ideology: Egalitarianism, Anti-capitalism, Political ecology
- Political position: Left-wing

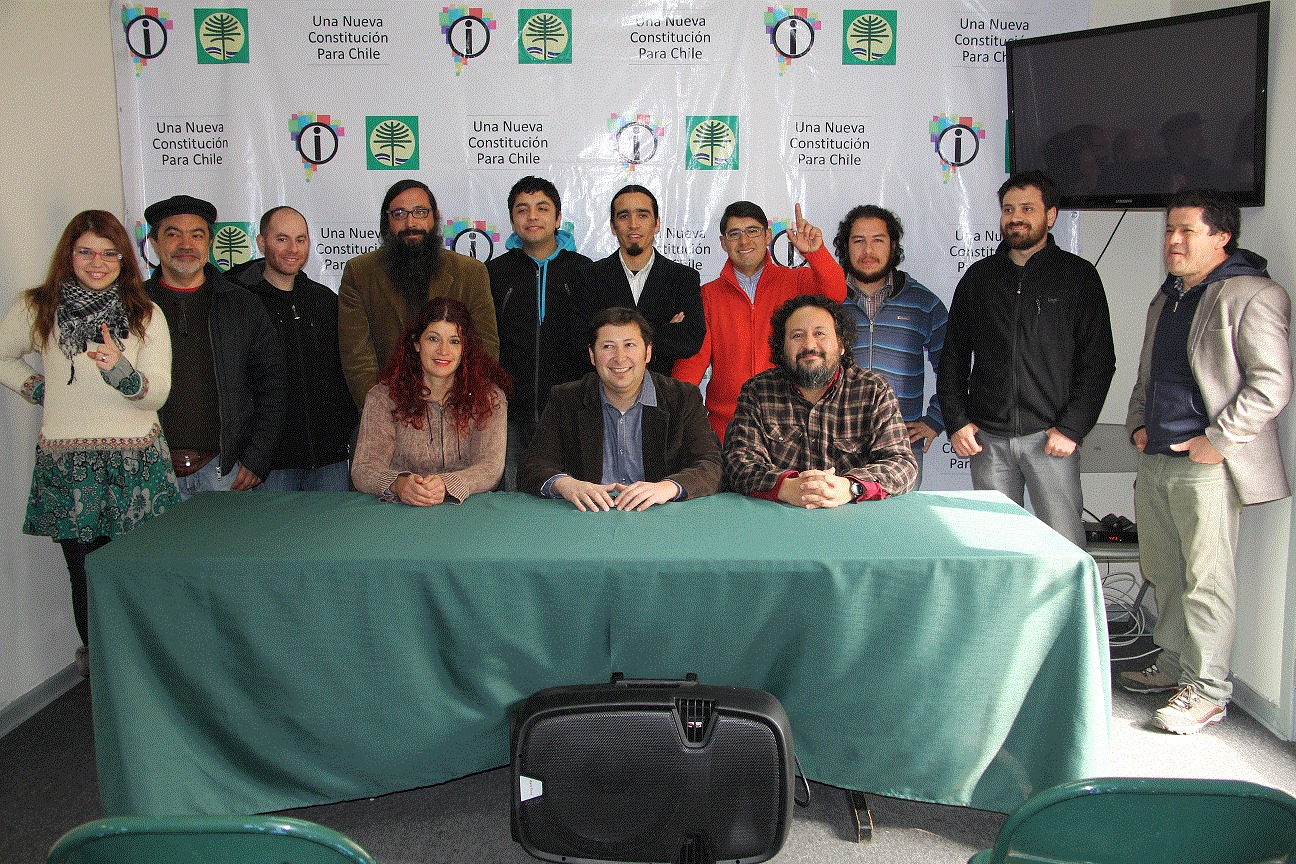
Joint press conference of Green Ecologist and Equality Party launching their electoral alliance in August 2013.

New Constitution for Chile was an electoral coalition of the Equality Party and the Green Ecologist Party founded to jointly contest the 2013 general election in Chile.

It was created on August 3, 2013 and registered officially with the Electoral Service on August 19.

The main objective of the coalition, as the name says, is to create a new Constitution of the Republic of Chile by performing a constituent assembly. While the pact exists as such in the parliamentary elections and regional advisers, in the presidential election each party will support a candidate separately: Roxana Miranda by Equality Party and Alfredo Sfeir by the Green Ecologist Party.

The coalition had nine candidates for the Senate elections, forty-nine candidates for the elections to the Chamber of Deputies, and seventy-seven candidates for regional councils. One regional councillor was elected.

== Composition ==
The coalition consisted of two political parties and other minor political movements.

Party	Spanish	Leader
Equality Party	Partido Igualdad	Roxana Miranda
Green Ecologist Party	Partido Ecologista Verde	Félix González Gatica

== Electoral results ==
=== Deputies ===
Party	Candidates	Votes	Percentage	Elected
Equality Party	20	67,094	1.08	0 / 120
Green Ecologist Party	5	32,762	0.53	0 / 120
Independents	23	73,047	1.17	0 / 120
Total	49	172,903	2.78	0 / 120

=== Senators ===
Party	Candidates	Votes	Percentage	Elected
Equality Party	3	70,962	1.57	0 / 38
Green Ecologist Party	1	9895	0.22	0 / 38
Independents	5	95,398	2.11	0 / 38
Total	9	175.915	3,90	0 / 38

=== Regional councillors ===
Party	Candidates	Votes	Percentage	Elected
Equality Party	20	39,336	0.68	0 / 278
Green Ecologist Party	10	34,318	0.59	1 / 278
Green Ecologist Party of the North	5	3,905	0.07	0 / 278
Independents	42	122,930	2.12	0 / 278
Total	77	200,489	3.46	1 / 278
