= 2013 Chilean presidential primaries =

Presidential primaries of the Alianza and Nueva Mayoría, 2013
- 30 June 2013
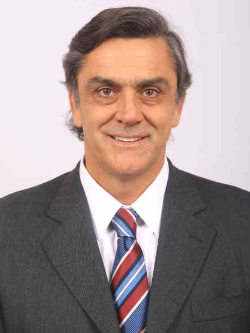

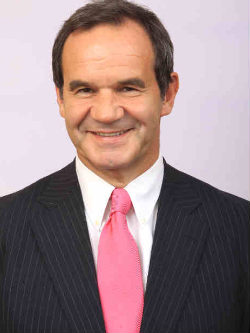

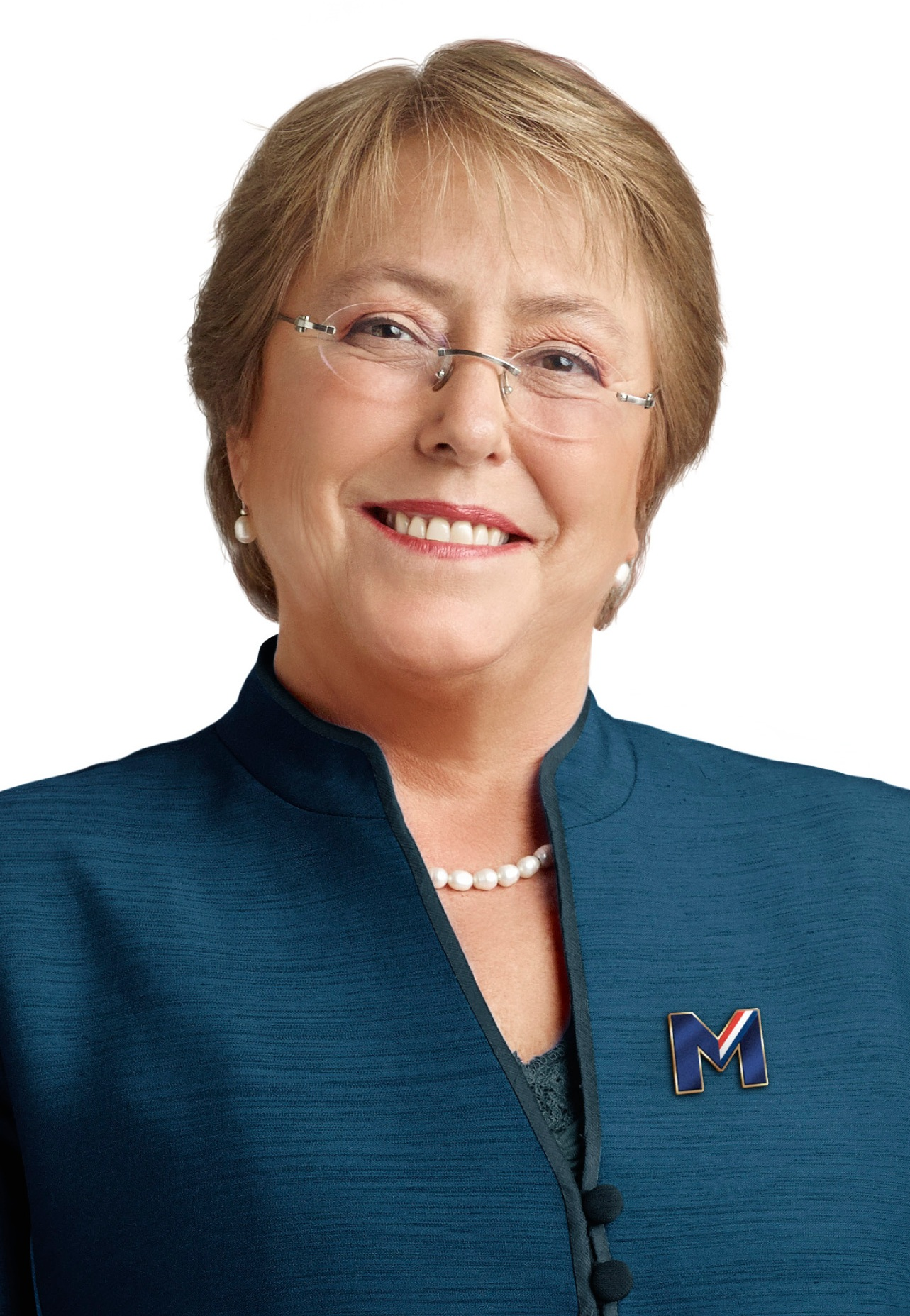

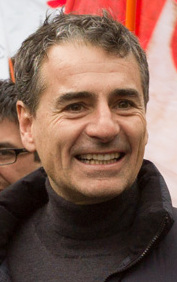

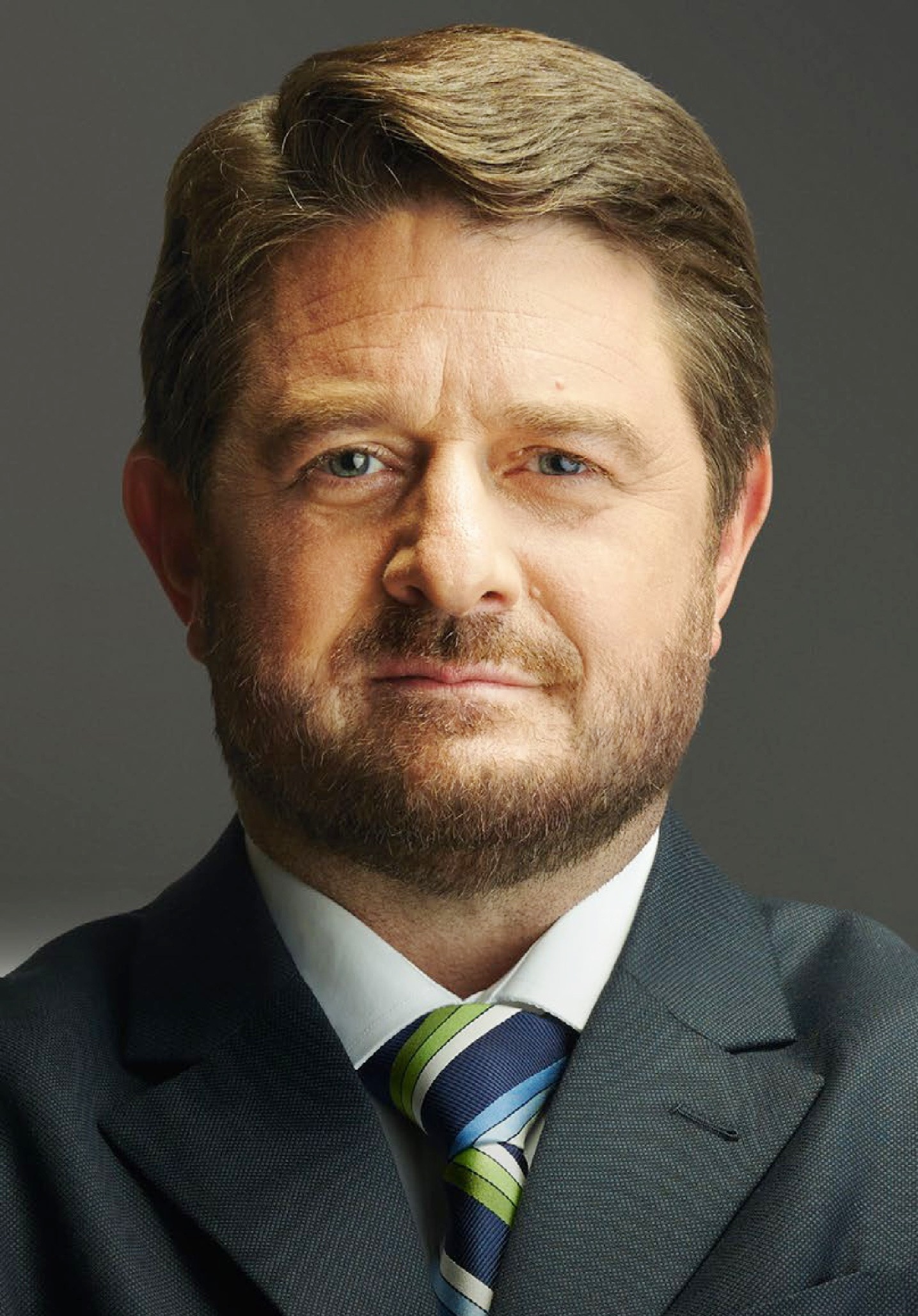

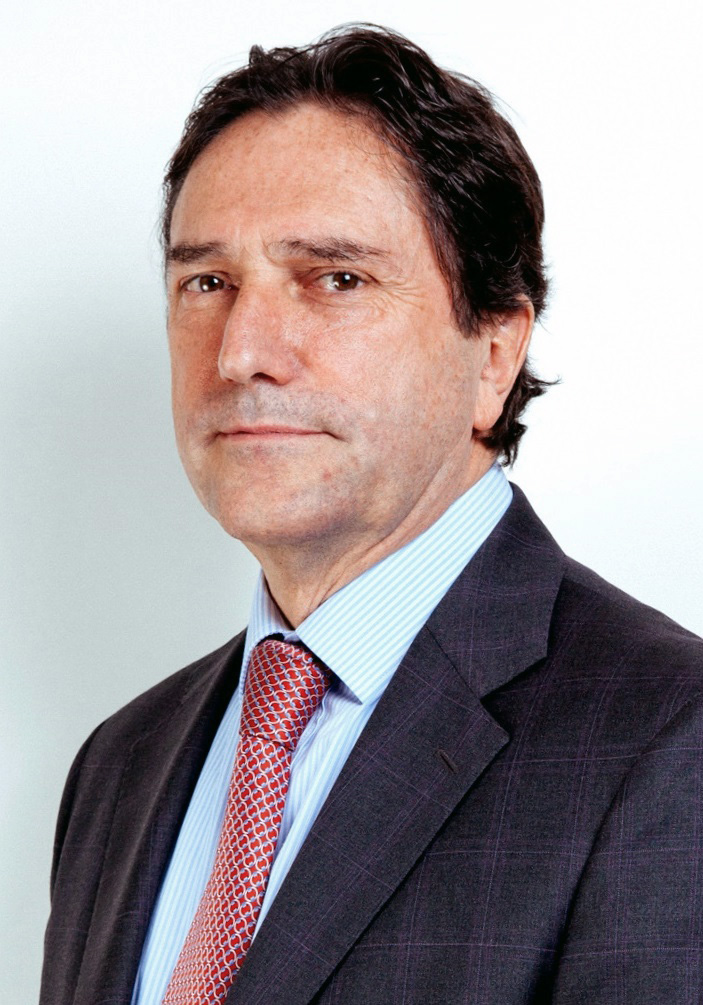
Candidate	Pablo Longueira	Andrés Allamand
Party	UDI	National Renewal
Alliance	Alliance	Alliance
Popular vote	414,380	392,221
Percentage	51.37%	48.63%
Candidate	Michelle Bachelet	Andrés Velasco
Party	Socialist	Independent
Alliance	New Majority	New Majority
Popular vote	1,561,563	278,056
Percentage	73.06%	13.01%
Candidate	Claudio Orrego	José Antonio Gómez
Party	PDC	Social Democrat Radical
Alliance	New Majority	New Majority
Popular vote	189,582	108,222
Percentage	8.87%	5.06%

The Chilean presidential primaries of 2013 were held in Chile on Sunday 30 June 2013. It was the first such election to be run by the government under a new primary law published in December 2012.

According to the law, primaries are voluntary, but its results are binding. The two main political coalitions decided to participate: Former president Michelle Bachelet won the Nueva Mayoría primary with 73% of the vote, while former senator and minister Pablo Longueira won the Alianza primary with 51%.

Longueira withdrew on 17 July and was replaced by Evelyn Matthei, who had not participated in the primaries. Bachelet defeated Matthei in the runoff election held on 15 December 2013.

== Candidates ==
=== Alianza candidates ===
Both candidates were officially registered on 1 May 2013. Affiliates from both Alianza parties (RN and UDI) plus independent electors were allowed to vote.

Candidate	Remarks
Andrés Allamand (RN)	The former Minister of Defense said on 22 April 2012 that he was willing to participate with Laurence Golborne and Pablo Longueira (both also ministers) in a three-way primary. He was proclaimed as candidate by his party on 6 November 2012.
Pablo Longueira (UDI)	The Minister of Economy was proclaimed as his party's candidate minutes after the resignation of then candidate Laurence Golborne on 29 April 2013. He left his cabinet post a day later.

Declined candidacy

- Laurence Golborne (Ind.), held several ministerial posts during Sebastián Piñera's tenure. On 4 November 2012 he said he was willing to become the right's candidate for president. On 17 November 2012 he was proclaimed as the right's pre-candidate by the Independent Democratic Union. On 29 Abril 2013, Golborne declined his candidacy after the Supreme Court fined his former employer Cencosud for illegally raising credit card maintenance fees, which Golborne as chief executive officer of the company had approved. At the same time there were press reports of Golborne having offshore accounts in the British Virgin Islands, that he had not properly registered in his property statement.

=== Nueva Mayoría candidates ===
All four candidates were officially registered on 30 April 2013. Affiliates from all Nueva Mayoría parties plus independent electors were allowed to vote.

Candidate	Remarks
Michelle Bachelet (PS)	The former president from 2006 to 2010 declared her intention to run for the presidency on 27 March 2013 during an act in El Bosque Commune (a poor suburb of Santiago), a few hours after arriving from New York City, where she had been working as head of UN Women before quitting two weeks before. On 7 April 2013 the Broad Social Movement (MAS) proclaimed Bachelet as their candidate. On 13 April 2013 Bachelet was proclaimed by the PS and the PPD, as agreed on in December 2012. On 25 May 2013 both the Communist Party and the Citizen Left movement decided to support Bachelet's candidacy.
José Antonio Gómez (PRSD)	Current senator. He says he will compete in a Concertación primary as long as they are held in a transparent way. Otherwise he says he may run directly as president outside of the coalition. On 30 June 2013 he was proclaimed by the PRSD as their pre-candidate for a Concertación primary.
Claudio Orrego (PDC)	PDC primary ballot. A primary was held on 19 January 2013 to determine the Christian Democratic Party's pre-candidate for the presidency. This primary was organized by the party and not under the new primary law. The contenders were Claudio Orrego and Ximena Rincón. Orrego won the primary with 59% of the vote.: Claudio Orrego, former minister and mayor, had said in January 2012 that he would seek reelection as mayor of Peñalolén in the October 2012 election, but that he did not rule out running for president. However, on 3 March 2012 he launched his candidacy for the presidency.; Ximena Rincón, senator, had expressed her willingness to compete in a Concertación primary during a television interview on 23 December 2011.; Provisional results: Candidate / Votes / % / Result; Claudio Orrego / 33,175 / 59.2 / PDC candidate; Ximena Rincón / 22,853 / 40.8; Valid votes / 56,028 / 100.0; Null and blank votes / 235 / 0.4; Total votes / 56,263 / 100.0
Andrés Velasco (Ind.)	Former Finance Minister during President Michelle Bachelet's tenure. He said he was willing to compete in a Concertación primary only if Bachelet decides not to run for reelection. In May 2012 he declared he had changed his mind and that now he would compete regardless of Bachelet's participation. He officially launched his pre-candidacy on 16 November 2012. On 2 May 2013, already registered to compete in primaries, he condemned the Nueva Mayoría pact for failing to register candidates for legislative primary elections and threatened to quit the competition and run directly in the November election. On 6 May 2013 he backpedaled, after party leaders pledged to carry out legislative primary elections wherever there were more than two candidates.

== Primary results ==
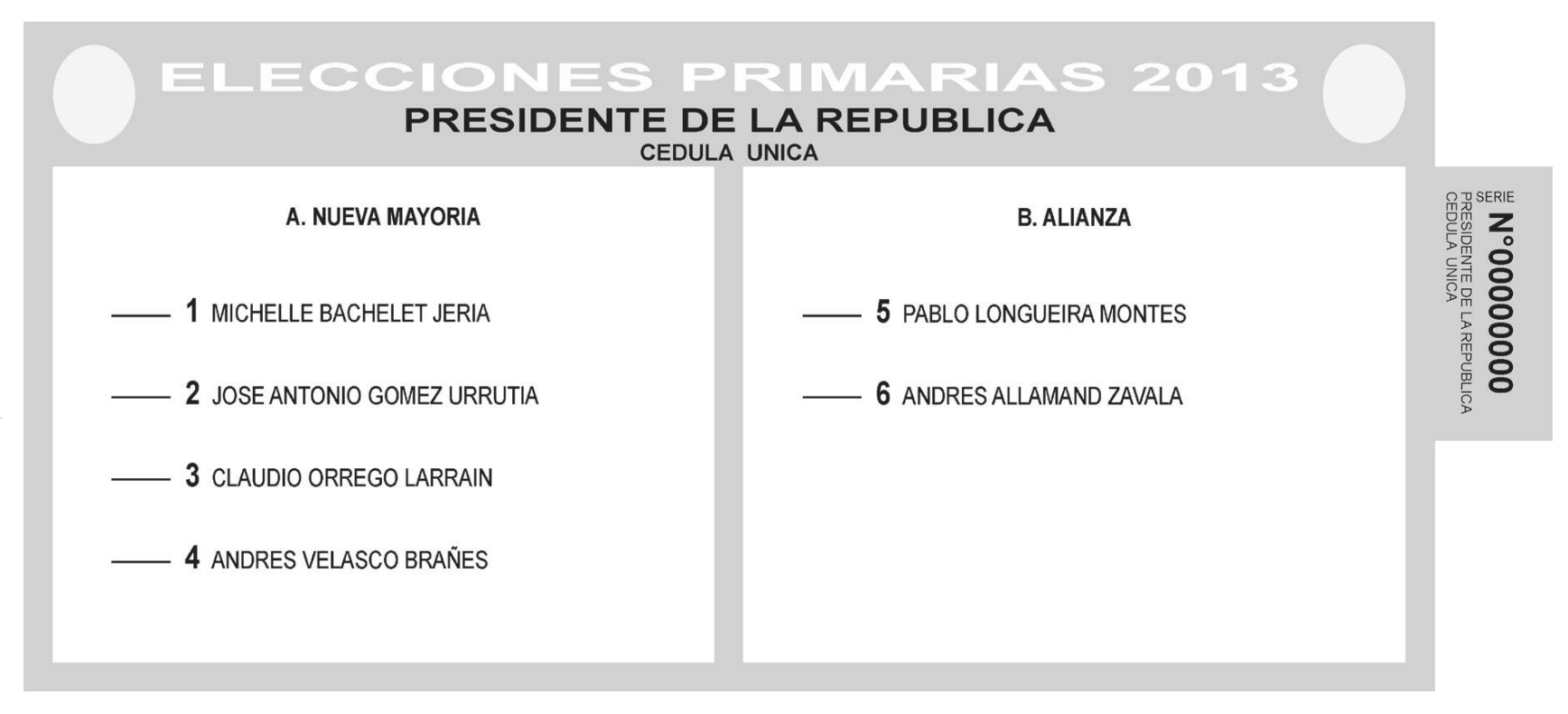
Primary ballot for independent electors.

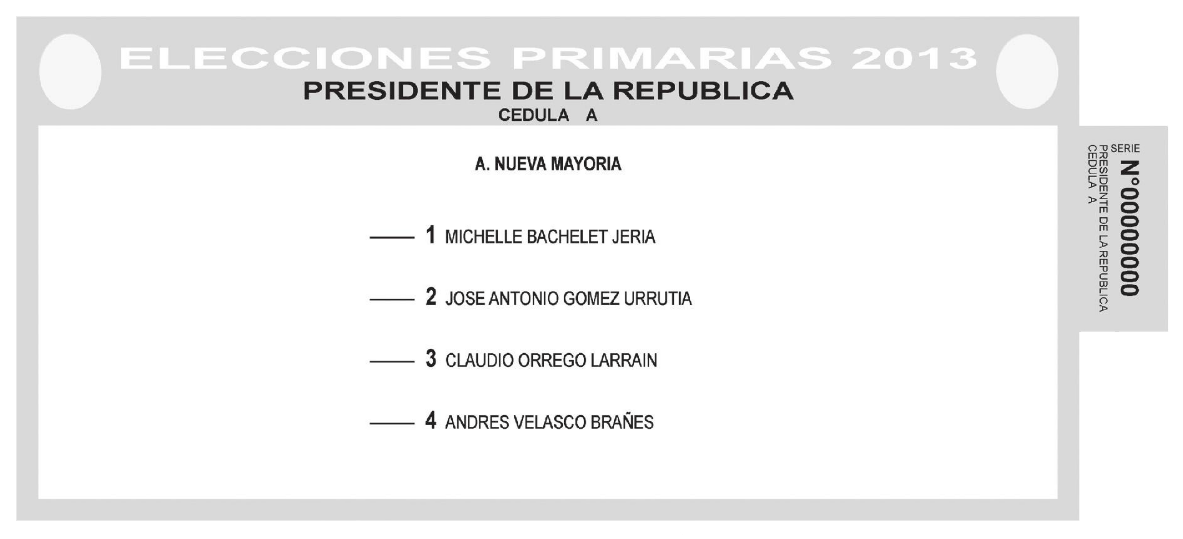
Primary ballot for Nueva Mayoría-party affiliates.

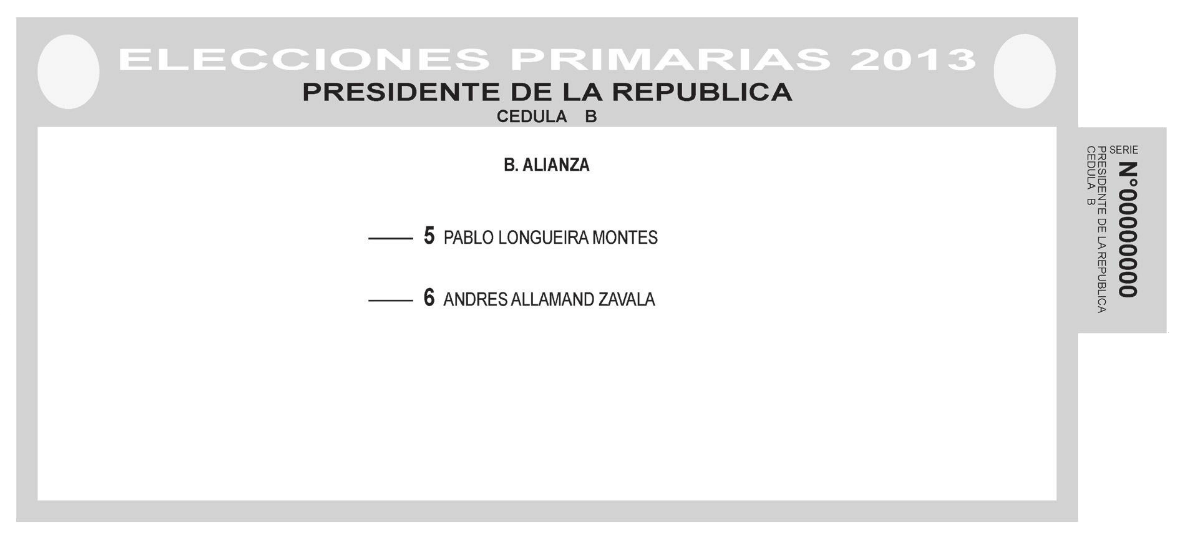
Primary ballot for Alianza-party affiliates.

Official and final results.

Ballot number	Candidate	Party	Votes	%	Result
(A) Nueva Mayoría primary
1	Michelle Bachelet	PS	1,565,269	73.07	Nueva Mayoría candidate
2	José Antonio Gómez	PRSD	108,365	5.05	
3	Claudio Orrego	PDC	189,752	8.85	
4	Andrés Velasco	Ind.	278,684	13.01	
	Total valid votes		2,142,070	100.00	
(B) Alianza primary
5	Pablo Longueira	UDI	415,087	51.37	Alianza candidate
6	Andrés Allamand	RN	392,915	48.62	
	Total valid votes		808,002	100.00	
	Total valid votes		2,950,072	97.98	
	Null votes		45,986	1.52	
	Blank votes		14,832	0.49	
	Total votes		3,010,890	100.00	
	Eligible voters		13,307,182	22.63% turnout	
	Voting age population		13,087,161	23.01% turnout	

Source: Tricel via Servel.

== Timeline ==
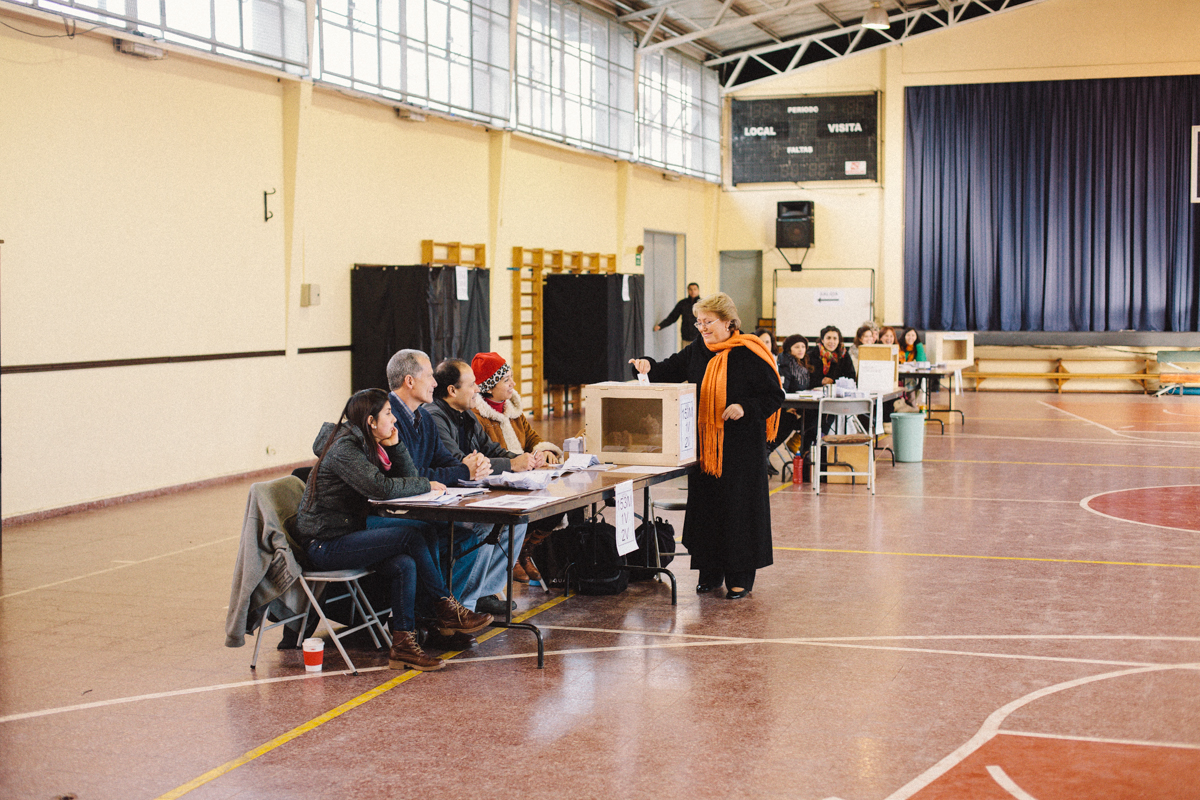
Michelle Bachelet casting her vote.

- April 29, 2013: Golborne quits race, replaced by Longueira on same day.
- May 1, 2013: Deadline to register in primaries.
- May 31, 2013: Primary campaign advertising starts.
- June 27, 2013: Primary campaign advertising ends.
- June 30, 2013: Primaries held simultaneously nationwide.

== See also ==
- 2013 Chilean general election
