= Everyone to La Moneda =

Everyone to La Moneda Tod@s a La Moneda
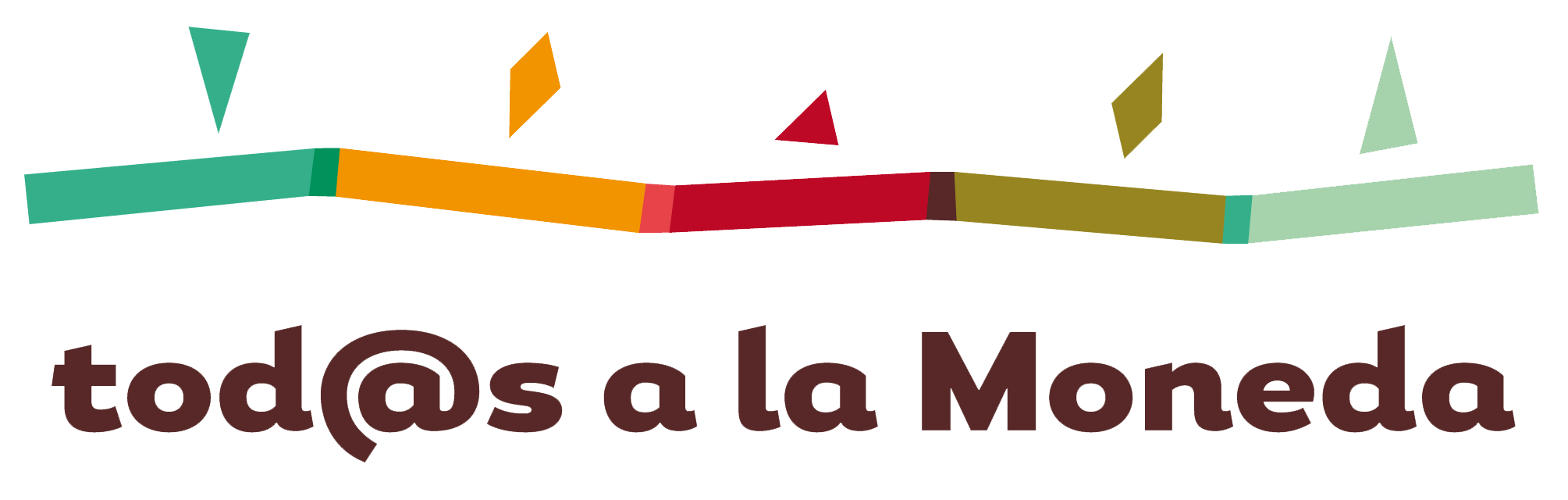
- Leader: Marcel Claude
- Founded: March 2013
- Ideology: Socialism; Ecologism; Ecosocialism; Progressivism
- Political position: Left-wing

Everyone to La Moneda (in Spanish: Todos a La Moneda, stylized Todxs a La Moneda or Tod@s a La Moneda) is a political movement created in 2013 to support independent candidate for president of Chile Marcel Claude. Todxs a La Moneda is composed by Izquierda Unida and the Humanist Party of Chile, for the presidential election of 17 November 2013.

The coalition is participating as an electoral pact in the regional advisors election of 2013, although, in the parliamentary election, the Humanist Party is appearing as a unique list, as only pacts with two or more legally constituted parties are accepted. As a consequence, several members of the movement, including Claude, adhered Todxs a La Moneda in an instrumental way.

== Goals ==
Todxs a La Moneda aims to "create a free society", which is the main focus (or axis) of Marcel Claude's presidential candidacy. Eight more goals have been proposed by the humanists and Claude, which are "essential to the Chilean society": "political constitution and democracy; deconcentration and decentralization of the State; diversity, human rights, discriminated majorities; native people; economic development: economy, work, productive development and social security; social politics: health, education, cultural development, housing; foreign policy and towards Latin America; environment and energy."

== Organization ==
Name	Occupation
Michely Bravo	General coordination
Tomás Hirsch	Spokesman
Salvador Muñoz	Spokesman
Francisco Carreras	Spokesman
Eduardo López	Spokesman
Carla Amtmann	Spokesman
Karen Hermosilla	Spokesman
Adrián Barahona	Communications coordinator
José Robredo	Press coordinator
Andrea Huaiquimil	Social networks coordinator
Leticia García	Program coordinator
Jorge Ramírez	Territorial coordinator
Camilo Navarro	Schedule
Alexis Meza	Political board coordinator
