= Roxana Miranda =

Chilean activist and politician (born 1967)

Roxana Miranda Meneses
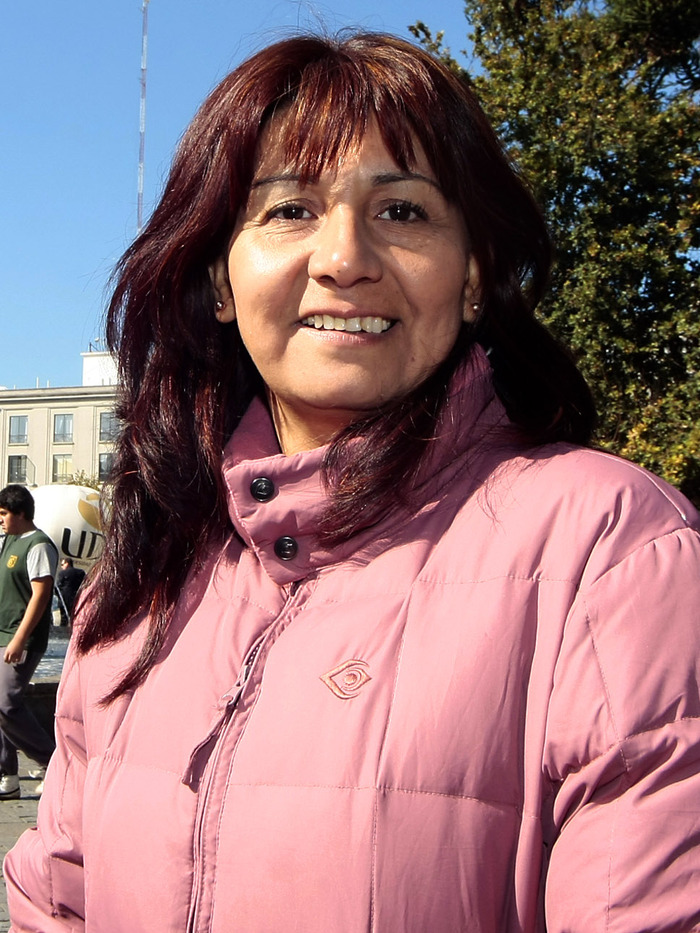
- Roxana Miranda in Concepción, in 2013

Personal details
- Born: Roxana del Pilar Miranda Meneses; 24 April 1967 (age 59) Buin, Chile
- Party: Partido Igualdad
- Spouse: Iván Luis Vargas García
- Children: 4
- Parent(s): Francisco Miranda Araya; Orfilia de las Mercedes Meneses Roa
- Occupation: Needlewoman and activist
- Known for: Candidate for President of Chile (2013)
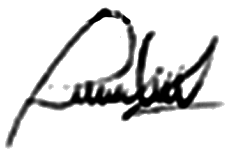
- Signature
- Website: roxanamiranda.cl

Roxana del Pilar Miranda Meneses (born 24 April 1967) is a Chilean activist and politician, candidate for President of Chile for the 2013 election, representing the Partido Igualdad.

== Biography ==
Miranda was born in Buin on 24 April 1967, to Francisco Miranda Araya, municipal worker, and Orfilia de las Mercedes Meneses Roa, seamstress. Her father died when she was six years old. She completed her secondary studies at the Liceo Comercial de San Bernardo, where she also held positions as student leader in the school's student council.

She married Iván Luis Vargas García in San Bernardo on 10 January 1994. The couple have four children.

== Political career ==
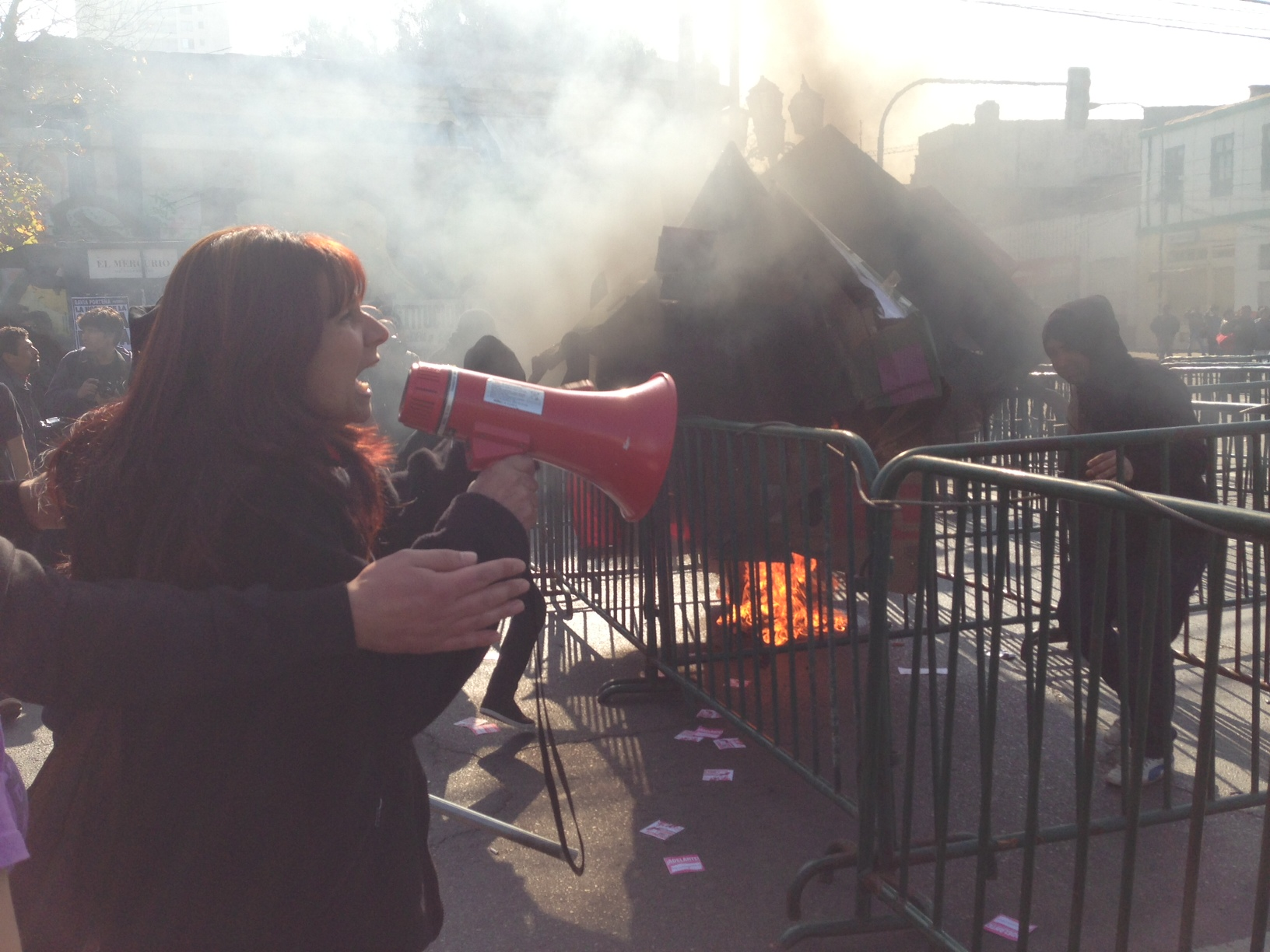
Miranda during a march in Valparaíso, on 21 May 2013.

Miranda has been involved with the Asociación de Deudores Habitacionales (Association of House Debtors, ANDHA Chile), as national leader of the organization, which in recent times has been renamed «ANDHA Chile a Luchar Democrático». In 2009, she ran for a deputy seat representing the District No. 30; however, she lost the election, ending up in the seventh place, with 4,332 votes (2.85 per cent). Miranda was a candidate for mayor of San Bernardo in 2008, as an independent, but lost the election, by only getting 3,558 votes (4.24%) out of 83,825. She ran again for the same position in the 2012 election, but obtained fewer votes than the previous municipal election (1,831 –2.77%– out of 65,944 votes).

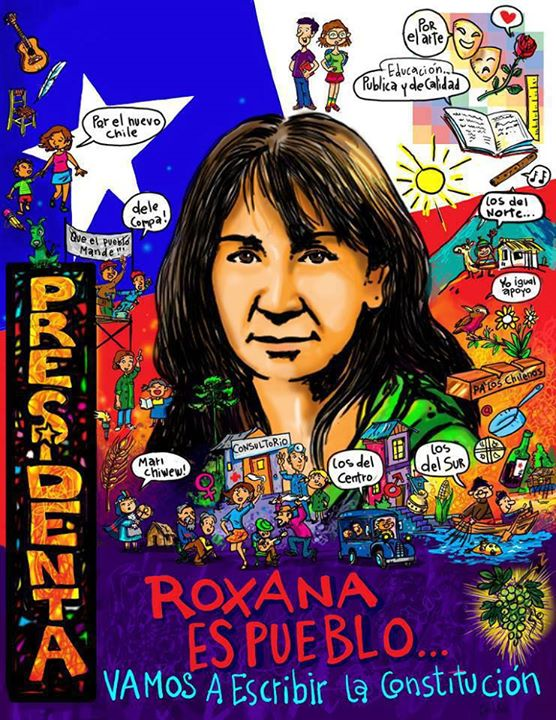
Propaganda poster of Roxana Miranda's presidential candidacy.

Later, she became president of the Partido Igualdad (Equality Party). She was proclaimed presidential candidate representing the party for the 2013 president election, on 20 January of that year. By the end of May of that year, it became known that the candidacies of Miranda and Marcel Claude were negotiating to "unify themselves" into only one candidacy, however, Miranda ruled out she was resigning her candidacy before the election. On 29 May 2013, Miranda gave the Electoral Service of Chile the requested signatures to legalize the Partido Igualdad, and as a consequence, formalizing her candidacy.

Miranda presented her government program, the last presidential candidate to do so, on 5 November 2013, which was centered in four areas related to social reforms. The 125-page document was introduced by Miranda Meneses "with proud (...) to begin, through the next four years, the profound transformation of Chile," and described it as a "plebeian program, of the people who wakes up and begins to organize itself to struggle for a better country". The four main areas of Roxana Miranda's program were titled: "Superación del capitalismo" (Overcoming capitalism), "Que el pueblo mande" (Let the people rule), "Recuperación de nuestros derechos" (recovering our rights), and "El buen vivir" (Good living). She lost the election.

== See also ==
- List of female Chilean presidential candidates
