= Tomás Jocelyn-Holt =

Chilean politician (born 1963)

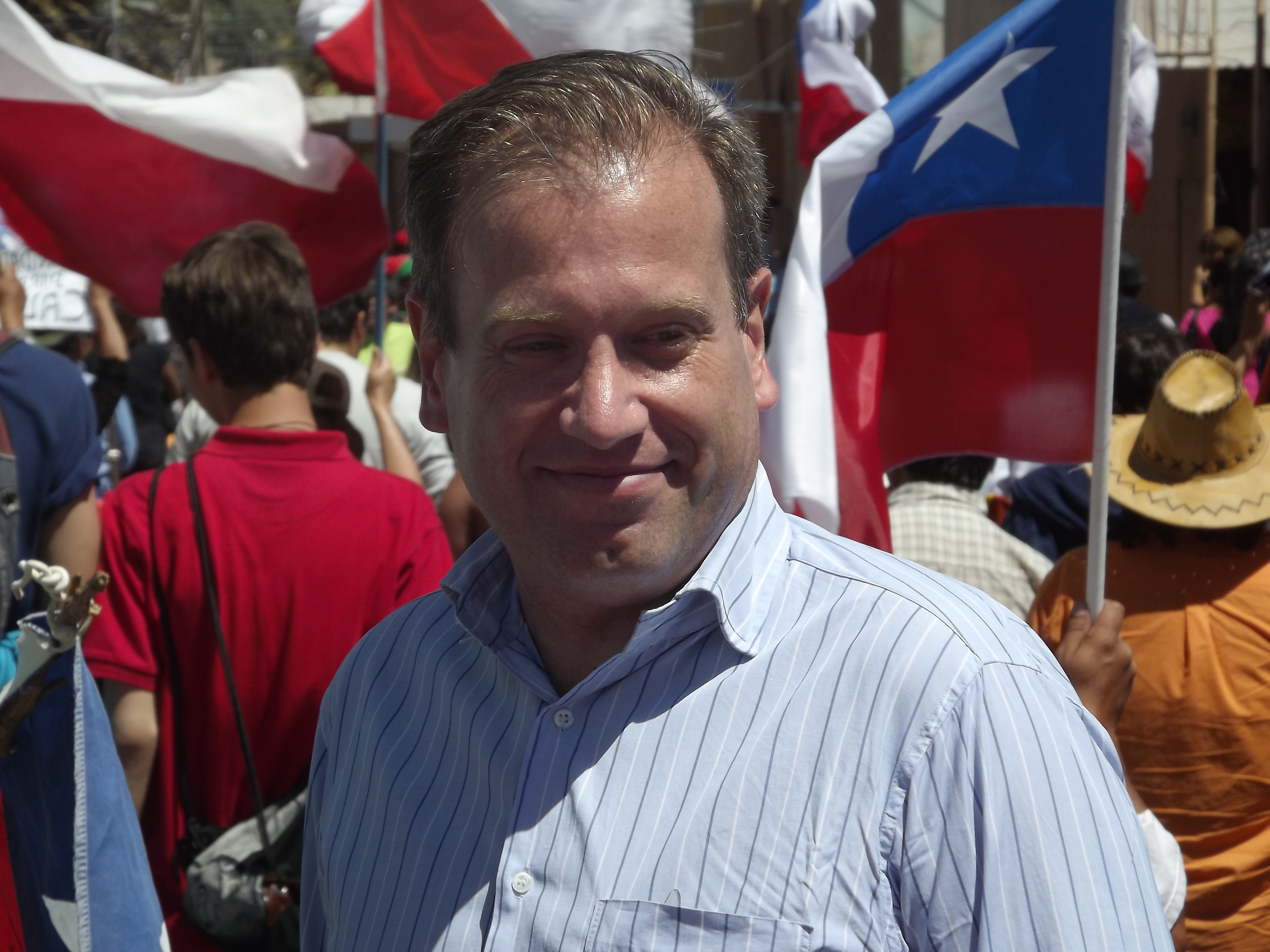

Member of the Chamber of Deputies of Chile for the District No. 24 (La Reina and Peñalolén)
- In office 11 March 1994 – 11 March 2002
- Preceded by: Martín Manterola
- Succeeded by: Enrique Accorsi Opazo

Personal details
- Born: José Tomás Jocelyn-Holt Letelier; January 16, 1963 (age 63) Santiago, Chile
- Party: Independent (2012–present); Christian Democrat Party of Chile (1982–2012)
- Spouse: Morin Eidelstein Areces
- Education: Pontifical Catholic University of Chile
- Occupation: Lawyer
- Known for: Candidate for President of Chile (2013)
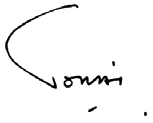
- Signature
- Website: tomaspresidente.cl

José Tomás Jocelyn-Holt Letelier (born 16 January 1963) is a Chilean politician, former member of the Christian Democrat Party of Chile (until 2012), and former member of the Chamber of Deputies of Chile between 1994 and 2002. Jocelyn-Holt Letelier was an independent candidate for the 2013 presidential election, but lost the election with the lowest voting percentage in the history of his country.

He's the younger brother of Alfredo Jocelyn-Holt, a well known historian. He also has another brother, Enrique, an economist.

== Biography ==
He was born in Santiago on 16 January 1963. He is the son of Alfredo Jocelyn-Holt, a former official of the Inter-American Development Bank (IDB), and Inés Letelier Saavedra, and the brother of historian Alfredo Jocelyn-Holt Letelier. He was first married to María Isabel Saval Bravo and later to Morín Eidelstein Areces.

He completed his primary education in Bethesda, Maryland, United States, and part of his secondary studies at Western Junior High School (1974–1976). He finished secondary school in Santiago at Colegio Nido de Águila (1976–1977) and at the Sagrados Corazones de Manquehue, graduating in 1979.

He subsequently studied Law at the Pontifical Catholic University of Chile. During his university years, he served as a teaching assistant in Administrative Law under Professor Jorge Precht. He worked at the law firms “Letelier, Munita y Cía.” (1980–1981) and later “Carey y Cía.” (1983), and contributed articles to publications such as the Revista de Ciencia Política of the Catholic University.

== Political career ==
He began his political career during his university years. Between 1985 and 1986, he was elected president of the Federation of Students of the Pontifical Catholic University of Chile (FEUC), becoming the first president elected after 13 years of suspension.

In 1988, he was elected executive secretary of the Alianza Democrática. He also worked in the media, serving as general manager of Editorial Aconcagua (1987–1988), member of the editorial board of the newspaper La Época (1990–1992), columnist for Ercilla, and panelist on the television program A eso de..., hosted by Jaime Celedón.

Between 1991 and 1994, he served as national councillor of the Christian Democratic Party (DC) and, in 1994, was elected national vice president, a position he held until 1997.

In 1993, he was elected deputy for District No. 24 (La Reina and Peñalolén), Santiago Metropolitan Region, for the 1994–1998 term, representing the Christian Democratic Party. He obtained 43,100 votes (31.27%). In 1997, he was re-elected in the same district for the 1998–2002 term, obtaining 26,126 votes (21.47%).

In the 2001 parliamentary elections, he ran for re-election in District No. 24 but was not re-elected. In 2009, he ran as candidate for senator for the Fourteenth Circumscription (Araucanía Norte) but was unsuccessful.

In January 2012, he resigned from the Christian Democratic Party.

In the presidential election of 17 November 2013, he ran as an independent candidate for President of the Republic, obtaining 12,594 votes (0.19%), finishing last among nine candidates.
