= 2013 Chilean general election =

- Presidential election
- 17 November 2013 (first round); 15 December 2013 (second round)
- Registered: 13,573,143 ▲63.82%
- Turnout: 49.35% (first round) ▼38.32pp 41.98% (second round) ▼44.96pp
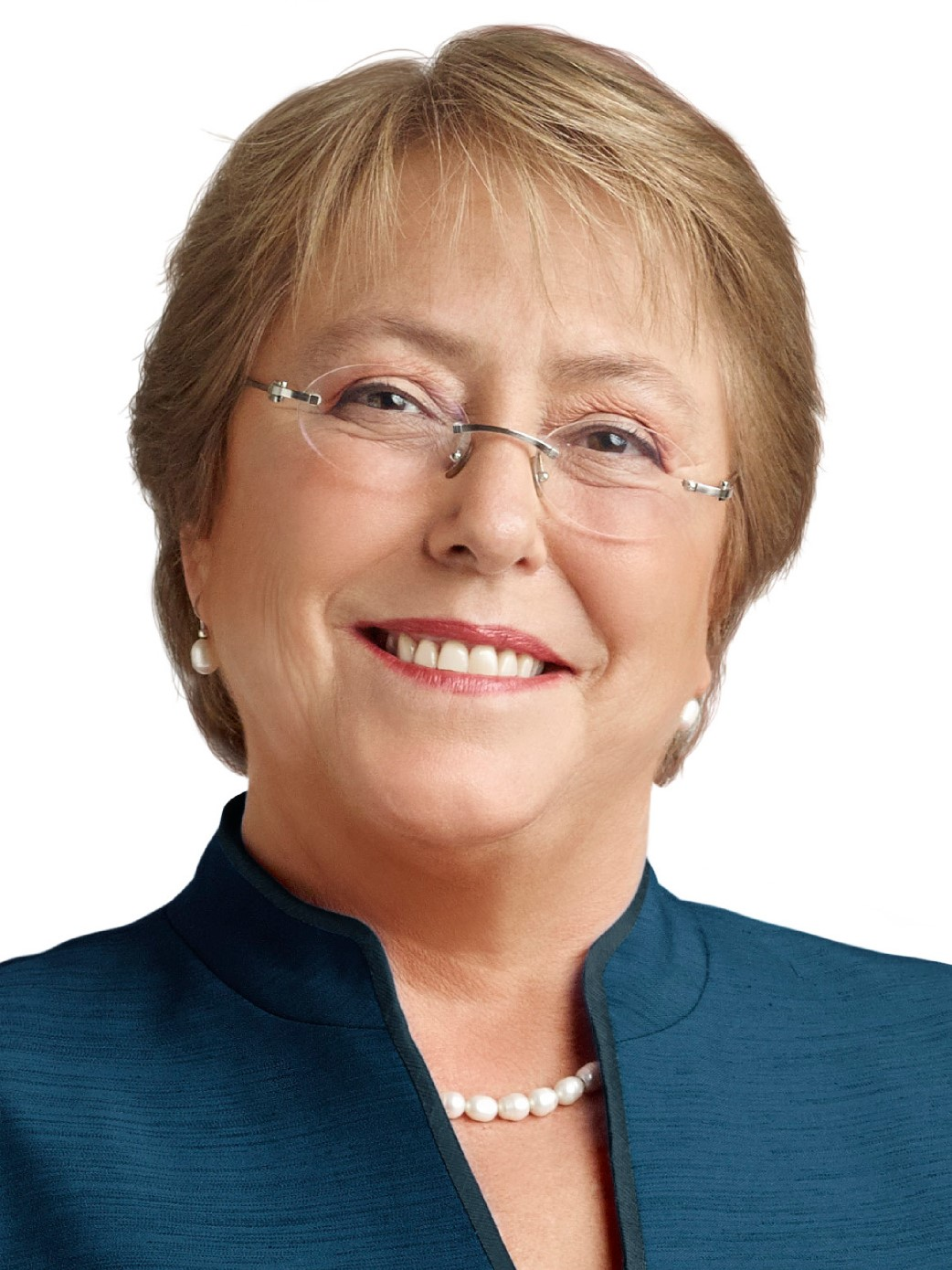

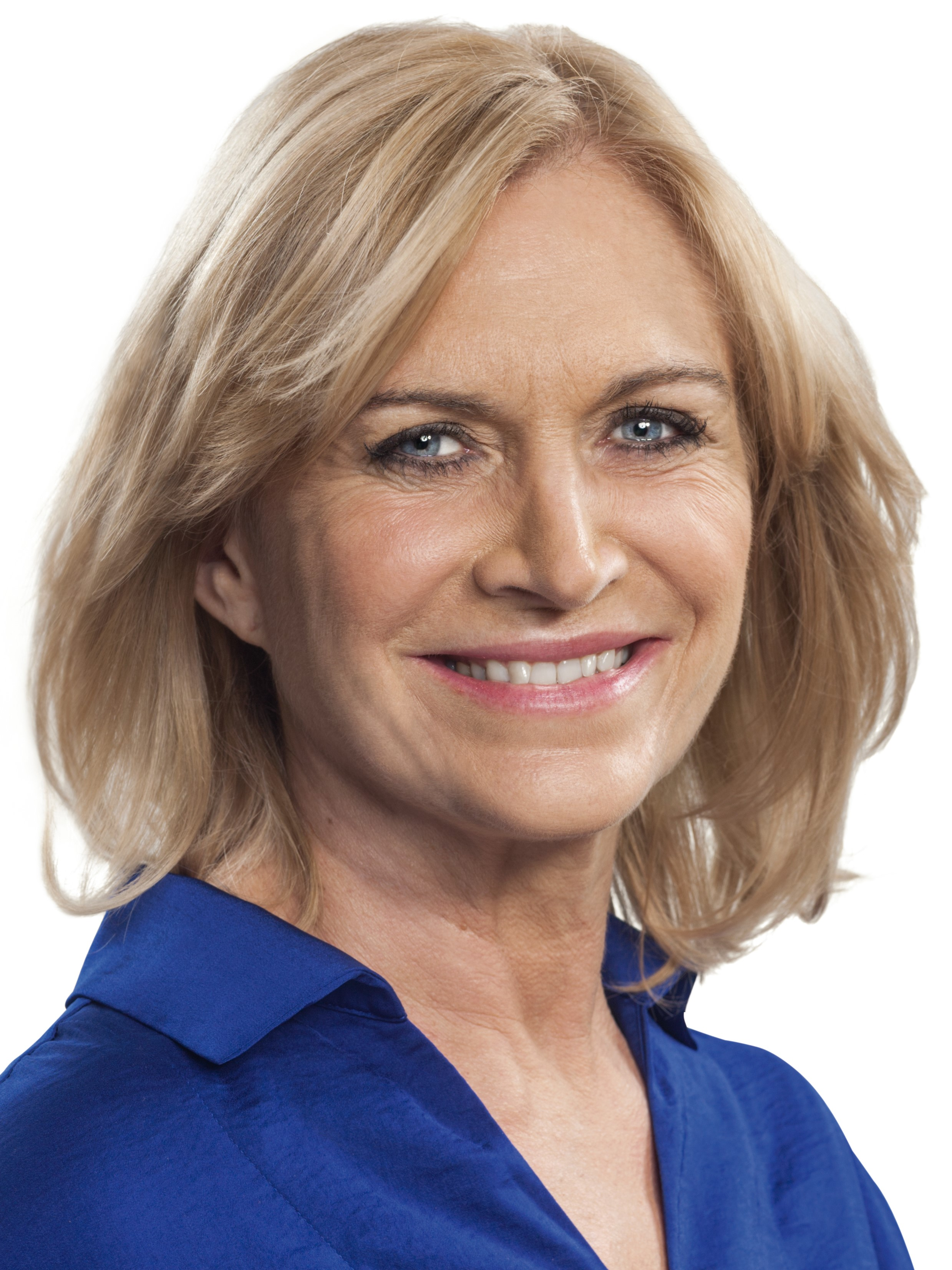
Candidate	Michelle Bachelet	Evelyn Matthei
Party	Socialist	UDI
Alliance	Nueva Mayoría	Alliance
Popular vote	3,470,379	2,111,891
Percentage	62.17%	37.83%
President before election
Sebastián Piñera
National Renewal
Elected President
Michelle Bachelet
Socialist
- Chamber of Deputies
- 17 November 2013
- All 120 seats in the Chamber of Deputies; 61 seats needed for a majority
Party	Vote %	Seats
Nueva Mayoría	47.71	67
Alliance	36.23	49
If You Want It, Chile Changes	5.43	1
Independents	3.32	3
This lists parties that won seats. See the complete results below.
- Senate
- 17 November 2013
- 20 of 38 seats in the Senate
Party	Vote %	Seats
Nueva Mayoría	50.63	12
Alliance	38.05	7
Independents	1.52	1
This lists parties that won seats. See the complete results below.

General elections were held in Chile on 17 November 2013 to elect the president, all 120 members of the Chamber of Deputies, 20 of the 38 members of the Senate and 278 members of regional boards. All elected members would serve a four-year term, aside from the Senators would serve for eight years. All the newly elected authorities began their terms on 11 March 2014.

In the presidential election, former president Michelle Bachelet fell short of the absolute majority needed for an outright win. In the runoff election, held on 15 December, she beat former senator and Minister of Labor Evelyn Matthei with over 62% of the vote, with turnout significantly lower than in the first round. This marked the first time two women faced each other in a runoff in Chilean history.

In the parliamentary elections, the New Majority coalition (backing Bachelet's candidacy) won back control of both chambers of Congress, winning 12 of the 20 contested seats in the Senate, for a total of 21 out of 38 total seats, and 67 of the 120 seats in the Chamber of Deputies.

These were the first presidential and parliamentary elections in which all eligible voters were automatically enrolled, and where voting was no longer mandatory (compulsory voting was reintroduced in 2022). Members of the regional boards were directly elected for the first time.

== Timeline ==
Notable events and dates.

- 30 June 2013: Primaries held simultaneously nationwide. Michelle Bachelet and Pablo Longueira win their respective primaries for president.
- 17 July 2013: Longueira quits the race.
- 20 July 2013: UDI picks Evelyn Matthei to replace Longueira.
- 19 August 2013: Deadline to register candidacies.
- 9 October 2013: First debate. Bachelet does not participate.
- 18 October 2013: Campaign advertising starts.
- 25 October 2013: Radio debate.
- 29–30 October 2013: Two-day television debate.
- 14 November 2013: Campaign advertising ends.
- 17 November 2013: Election takes place.
- 22 November 2013: The Electoral Service publishes on its website a revised count made by polling officers the day after the election.
- 1 December 2013: Runoff campaign advertising starts.
- 3 December 2013: The Election Court (Tricel) publishes the final results of the first round election in the Official Gazette and calls for a runoff election between the top two candidates.
- 6 December 2013: Radio debate.
- 10 December 2013: Television debate.
- 12 December 2013: Runoff campaign advertising ends.
- 15 December 2013: Runoff election.
  - Polls close at 6 PM nationwide.
  - At about 7 PM, Matthei concedes defeat, telling reporters outside her home: "It is clear, she has won".
  - At about 7:20 PM Matthei gives her concession speech.
- 17 December 2013: The Electoral Service publishes on its website a revised count made by polling officers the day after the election.
- 10 January 2014: The Tricel officially proclaims Bachelet as President-Elect during a ceremony in Santiago, and publishes the final results of the second round election on its website.
- 11 March 2014: The President-elect takes office in a ceremony at the National Congress in Valparaíso.

== Presidential primaries ==
In December 2012 a law was published allowing political parties or coalitions to define their candidates for president in government-run primary elections. The two main political groups agreed to choose their candidates this way. Former president Michelle Bachelet won the New Majority primary with 73% of the vote, while former senator and minister Pablo Longueira won the Alliance primary with 51%. Longueira subsequently quit the race and was replaced with Evelyn Matthei. Sitting president Sebastián Piñera did not stand for re-election due to term limits.

== Presidential candidates ==
List of candidates who officially registered their candidacies at the Electoral Service. All candidacies were accepted on 28 August 2013. Bachelet's candidacy was automatically accepted after she was proclaimed the winner of her primary by the Election Court.

Candidate	Endorsement	Remarks
Michelle Bachelet; Socialist Party	New Majority: Socialist Party; Party for Democracy; Broad Social Movement; Communist Party; Citizen Left; Christian Democratic Party; Social Democrat Radical Party	The former President from 2006 to 2010 became the New Majority candidate after beating three other candidates in a coalition primary held on 30 June 2013. For further details, see Chilean presidential primaries, 2013.
Marcel Claude; Humanist Party	Everybody to La Moneda: Humanist Party; United Left (movement)	The leftist economist and university professor launched his candidacy on 26 January 2013. On 12 March 2013 he was proclaimed by the Humanist Party as their candidate. He officially registered his candidacy at the Electoral Service on 12 August 2013.
Marco Enríquez-Ominami; Progressive Party	If You Want It, Chile Changes: Progressive Party; Liberal Party; Allendist Socialism (movement)	The 2009 candidate launched his candidacy on 4 October 2012 at a theater in Santiago. On 5 May 2013, he was proclaimed as candidate by the Allendist Socialism movement. On 15 June 2013, he was proclaimed as candidate by the Liberal Party (formerly known as Chilefirst) and on 13 July 2013 by the Progressive Party. He officially registered his candidacy at the Electoral Service on 17 August 2013.
Ricardo Israel; Regionalist Party of the Independents	Regionalist Party of the Independents	The political scientist was proclaimed by the Regionalist Party of the Independents (PRI) on 20 July 2013. He officially registered his candidacy at the Electoral Service on 14 August 2013.
Tomás Jocelyn-Holt; Independent	Independent electors	Former Christian Democrat deputy and former member of the Liberal Party (PL). On 9 December 2012, the PL decided to withdraw their support for his candidacy. He officially registered his independent candidacy at the Electoral Service on 19 August 2013.
Evelyn Matthei; Independent Democratic Union	Alliance: Independent Democratic Union; National Renewal	The former senator and Labor minister was picked as candidate by her party's political commission on 20 July 2013, replacing Pablo Longueira who had quit the race three days earlier. She was formally proclaimed as candidate by both UDI and National Renewal on 10 August 2013. She officially registered her candidacy at the Electoral Service on 18 August 2013. For further details, see Chilean presidential primaries, 2013.
Roxana Miranda; Equality Party	Equality Party	The leader of ANDHA Chile (a group representing mortgage borrowers) was proclaimed on 21 January 2013 as the Equality Party's candidate for president. She officially registered her candidacy at the Electoral Service on 19 August 2013.
Franco Parisi; Independent	Independent electors	Economist and television commentator. On 7 August 2013, Parisi officially registered his independent candidacy at the Electoral Service. He presented over 52 thousand signatures, many more than the required minimum.
Alfredo Sfeir; Green Ecologist Party	Green Ecologist Party	The economist and spiritual leader was proclaimed as candidate by the Green Ecologist Party on 13 April 2013, after beating Félix González in a party primary. He officially registered his candidacy at the Electoral Service on 19 August 2013.

=== Unsuccessful candidacies ===
- Eduardo Díaz (Ind.): The former mayor of Toltén and founder of the Party of the South (now defunct) is supported by the Alianza Independiente Regionalista (AIRE) movement. By July 2013 he said he had collected around 28 thousand signatures. However, he did not officially register his candidacy before the legal deadline of 19 August 2013.
- Pablo Longueira (UDI): The former Minister of Economy and senator became the Alliance candidate for president after he beat Andrés Allamand from the National Renewal party in a two-party primary held on 30 June 2013. However, on 17 July 2013 he unexpectedly quit the race after being diagnosed with depression.
- Gustavo Ruz (Ind.): Sociologist and founder of the «Movement for a Constituent Assembly» was selected by said group as their candidate on 14 May 2013. On 19 August 2013 he stepped out of the race, having collected only 27 thousand signatures out of the necessary 36 thousand.

== Opinion polls for presidential race ==
Legend
—	Not on the list
	Wins election
	May win election
	Runoff
	May go to a runoff

=== First-round scenarios ===
Publisher	Field date	Bachelet	Claude	MEO	Israel	TJH	Matthei	Miranda	Parisi	Sfeir	Other	DK/NR	Error	Comments
CERC	10 – 22 June 2013	51	3	5	—	—	—	—	4	—	24	14	3.0	Source
La Segunda-UDD	9 – 10 July 2013	39	2	7	—	—	—	—	6	—	25	21	3	Source
CEP	13 July - 18 August 2013	45	2	4	—	—	11	—	4	—	14	20	3.0	Open question. (Source)
IPSOS	17 August - 9 September 2013	31	7	9	1	2	20	1	13	2	—	15	3.3	Will go to vote (75%). (Source)
IPSOS	17 August - 9 September 2013	33	8	11	1	1	22	1	11	1	—	11	3.3	Likely voters (53%). (Source)
Conecta	30 August -7 September 2013	39.8	3.2	8.8	0.2	—	17.7	0.8	9.9	0.5	4.1	15.0	3.9	Source
Ichem (U. Autónoma)	23 August - 27 September 2013	44.4	3.5	8.4	0.2	0.2	17.3	0.0	7.6	0.8	—	17.7	2.35	Will "surely" go to vote (55%). (Source)
La Segunda-UDD	10 – 12 September 2013	38	4	7	0	0	27	0	8	1	—	15	3.1	Source
ICSO (UDP)	2 September - 10 October 2013	45.2	4.6	7.3	<1.0	<1.0	15.9	<1.0	12.0	<1.0	4.9	9.6	2.72	Likely voters (51.4%). (Source)
CEP	13 September - 14 October 2013	47	3	7	0	0	14	0	10	0	16	3	3.0	Ballot-box vote. (Source)
CEP	13 September - 14 October 2013	54	3	8	0	0	19	0	7	0	—	9	3.0	Will "surely" go to vote (50%). Questionnaire. (Source)
CEP	13 September - 14 October 2013	53.6	4.1	7.2	0.0	0.1	17.1	0.5	7.8	0.4	9.3	—	3.0	Will "surely" go to vote (50%). Ballot-box vote. (Source)
IPSOS	24 September - 4 October 2013	34	6	7	2	2	19	2	15	1	—	12	3.3	Will go to vote (72%). (Source)
IPSOS	24 September - 4 October 2013	33	5	7	2	2	23	2	15	1	—	10	3.3	Likely voters (49%). (Source)
IPSOS	8 – 18 October 2013	30	6	8	2	2	19	3	15	2	—	13	2.6	Will go to vote (75%). (Source)
IPSOS	8 – 18 October 2013	32	6	7	2	3	20	3	14	2	—	11	2.6	Likely voters (51%). (Source)
La Segunda-UDD	16 – 17 October 2013	40	3	7	0	0	26	0	10	0	—	14	3.4	Source
El Mercurio-Opina	19/20 and 26/27 October 2013	46.2	1.7	7.2	0.2	0.1	21.7	1.1	7.9	0.3	13.6	—	3.1	Likely voters (56.1%). Ballot-box vote. (Source)
IPSOS	19 October - 5 November 2013	30	5	12	2	0	20	3	13	2	—	13	2.2	Will go to vote (76%). (Source)
IPSOS	19 October - 5 November 2013	32	6	11	2	0	20	3	14	3	—	9	2.2	Likely voters (54%). (Source)

=== Second-round scenarios ===
==== Bachelet vs. Matthei ====
Publisher	Field date	Bachelet	Matthei	Other	DK/NR	Error	Comments
Conecta	30 August - 7 September 2013	57.6	23.1	9.3	10.0	3.9	Source
ICSO (UDP)	2 September - 10 October 2013	47.4	17.2	22.0	13.4	2.72	Source
Ipsos-Usach	21 November - 2 December 2013	65.2	34.9	—	—	4.3	Voted in first round and will go to vote. (Source)

== Presidential campaign ==
=== Debates ===
==== First round ====
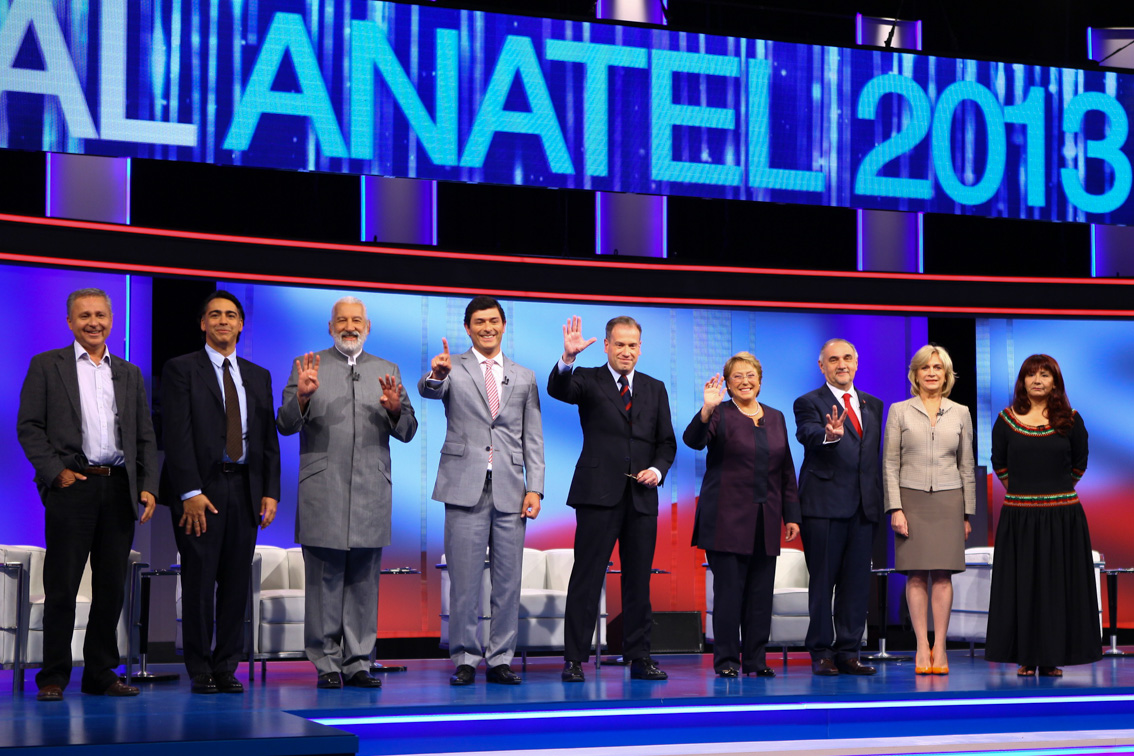
All nine candidates during the Anatel debate.

The first debate was organized by ANP (National Press Association) and CNN Chile and took place in Coquimbo's Enjoy Casino on 9 October. It ran from 20:00-22:00 with all candidates —except Bachelet, citing a prior commitment— participating. It was moderated by CNN Chile anchor Daniel Matamala. There were four other journalists from regional media present who asked the candidates two randomly selected questions. Matamala also asked two questions, which were the same to all eight candidates.

A radio debate organized by the Radio Broadcasters Association of Chile (Archi), took place on 25 October 2013 at the Gabriela Mistral Cultural Centre (GAM) in Santiago. The debate, which featured all nine candidates for the first time, was broadcast by over 600 radio stations across the country. It started at 8 AM and lasted for about 140 minutes. It was moderated by Archi president Luis Pardo and included four radio journalists: Sergio Campos (Cooperativa), Cony Stipicic (Duna), Mauricio Bustamente (Infinita) and Alejandro de la Carrera (Agricultura).

A series of two consecutive televised debates were organized by the National Television Association (Anatel) and broadcast by all national terrestrial television stations. All nine candidates participated, as well. The first part of the debate aired on 29 October 2013, with a second part transmitted the next day. Both shows took place at TVN's studios in Santiago, beginning at 10 PM and running for over two hours. Former Anatel president Bernardo Donoso served as moderator. The journalists for the first day were Constanza Santa María (Canal 13), Soledad Onetto (Mega) and Claudio Elórtegui (UCV-TV); while the journalists for the second day were Beatriz Sánchez (La Red), Iván Núñez (Chilevisión) and Mauricio Bustamante (TVN).

==== Runoff ====
A radio debate on 6 December 2013 was organized by Archi. A television debate organized by Anatel was held 10 December 2013.

== Results ==
=== President ===
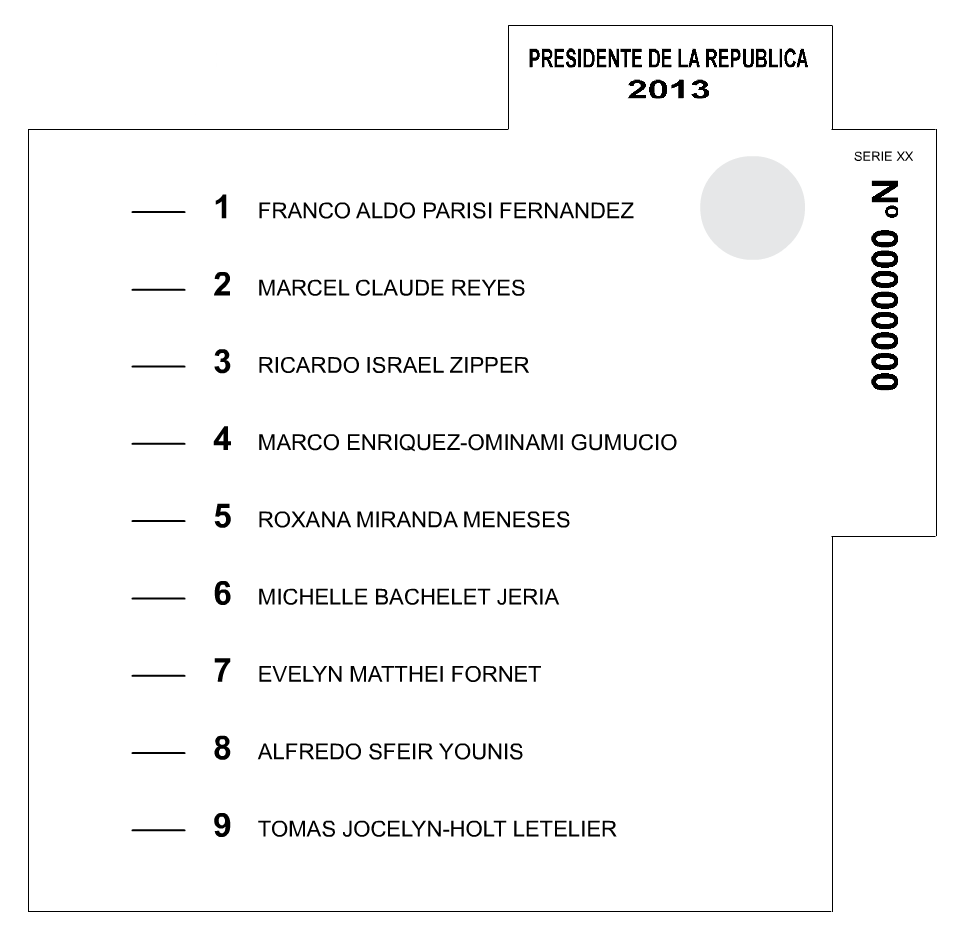
Ballot used in the first round

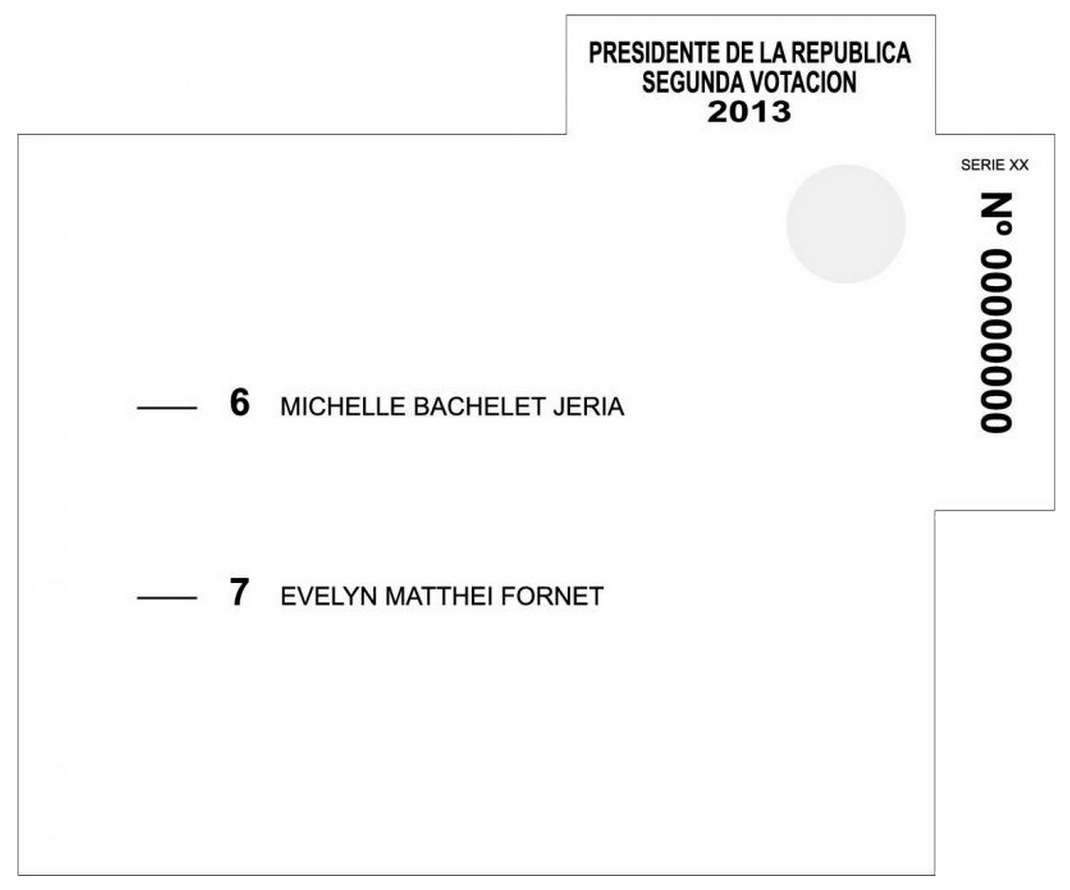
Ballot used in the runoff

Candidate	Party or alliance		First round		Second round	
Candidate	Party or alliance		Votes	%	Votes	%
Michelle Bachelet	Nueva Mayoría	PS	3,075,839	46.70	3,470,379	62.17
Evelyn Matthei	Alliance	UDI	1,648,481	25.03	2,111,891	37.83
Marco Enríquez-Ominami	If You Want It, Chile Changes	PRO	723,542	10.99		
Franco Parisi	Independent		666,015	10.11		
Marcel Claude	Everyone to La Moneda	PH	185,072	2.81		
Alfredo Sfeir	Green Ecologist Party		154,648	2.35		
Roxana Miranda	Equality Party		81,873	1.24		
Ricardo Israel	Independent Regionalist Party		37,744	0.57		
Tomás Jocelyn-Holt	Independent		12,594	0.19		
Total			6,585,808	100.00	5,582,270	100.00
Valid votes			6,585,808	98.31	5,582,270	97.97
Invalid votes			66,935	1.00	82,916	1.46
Blank votes			46,268	0.69	32,565	0.57
Total votes			6,699,011	100.00	5,697,751	100.00
Registered voters/turnout			13,573,143	49.35	13,573,143	41.98
Source: Tricel via Diario Oficial, Tricel via LeyChile, Tricel

=== Senate ===
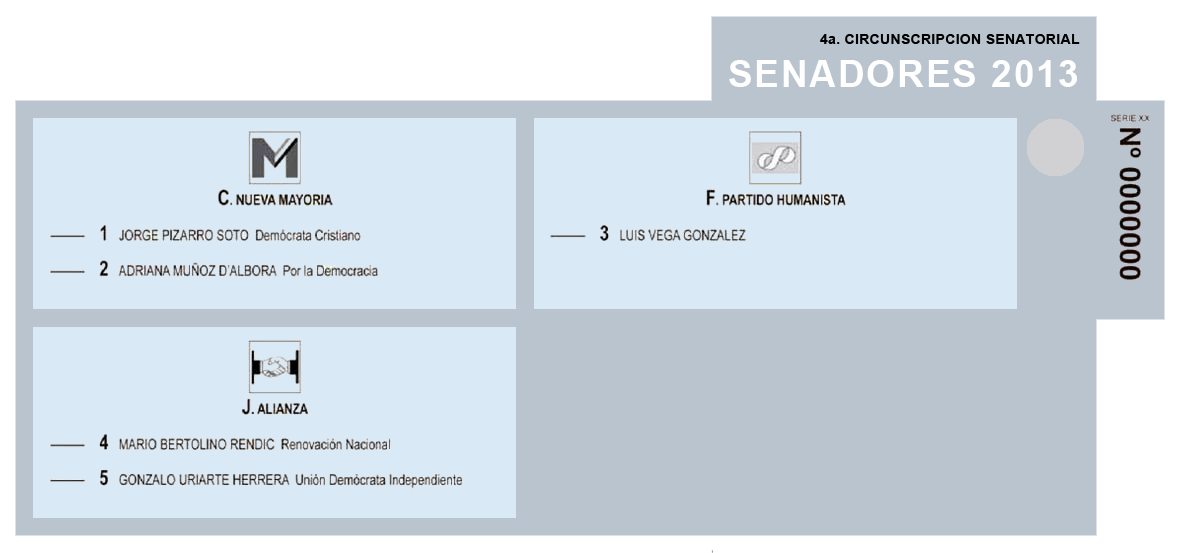
Ballot used in the Senate election in Coquimbo region.

Senators are elected for eight-year mandates, and roughly half of the Senate is renewed every four years. On this election, ten out of 19 senatorial constituencies were contested. As each constituency elects two representatives, this results in 20 new senators.

Party or alliance		Votes	%	Seats		
Party or alliance		Votes	%	Won	Not up	Total
Nueva Mayoría	Christian Democratic Party	744,261	16.51	2	4	6
Nueva Mayoría	Socialist Party	728,455	16.16	4	2	6
Nueva Mayoría	Party for Democracy	556,131	12.33	3	3	6
Nueva Mayoría	Broad Social Movement	156,372	3.47	1	0	1
Nueva Mayoría	Communist Party	6,423	0.14	0	0	0
Nueva Mayoría	Independents	91,112	2.02	2	0	2
Nueva Mayoría	Total	2,282,754	50.63	12	9	21
Alliance	National Renewal	733,726	16.27	2	6	8
Alliance	Independent Democratic Union	662,447	14.69	5	3	8
Alliance	Independents	319,528	7.09	0	0	0
Alliance	Total	1,715,731	38.05	7	9	16
New Constitution for Chile	Equality Party	70,692	1.57	0	0	0
New Constitution for Chile	Green Ecologist Party	9,895	0.22	0	0	0
New Constitution for Chile	Independents	95,328	2.11	0	0	0
New Constitution for Chile	Total	175,915	3.90	0	0	0
Humanist Party		156,336	3.47	0	0	0
If You Want It, Chile Changes	Independents	109,702	2.43	0	0	0
Independents		68,706	1.52	1	0	1
Total		4,509,114	100.00	20	18	38
Valid votes		4,509,114	92.93			
Invalid votes		166,402	3.43			
Blank votes		176,649	3.64			
Total votes		4,852,165	100.00			
Source: Servel

=== Chamber of Deputies ===
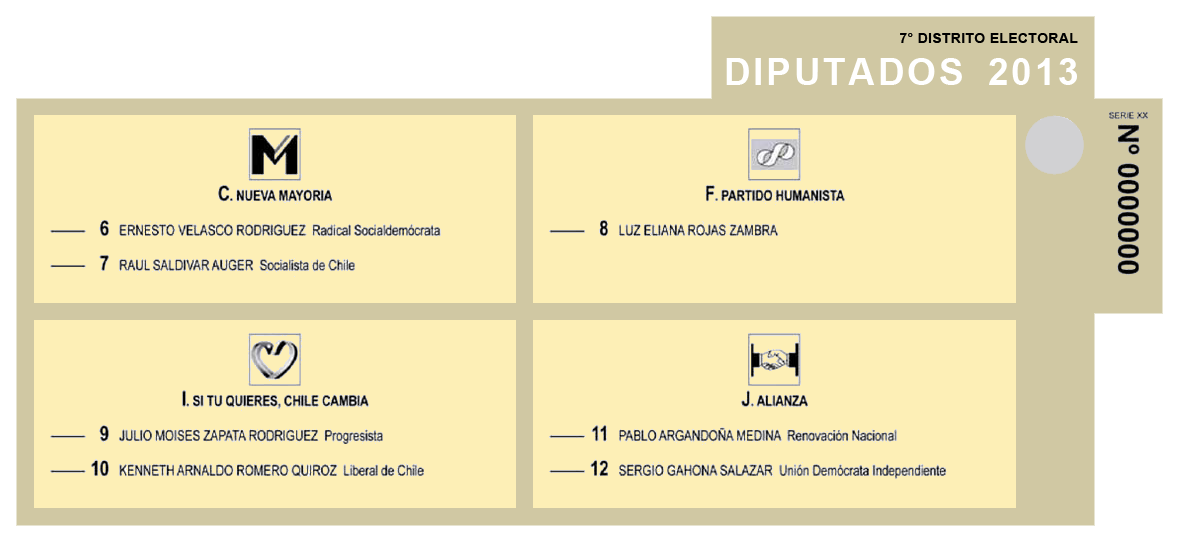
Ballot used in the deputies election.

Party or alliance		Votes	%	Seats
Nueva Mayoría	Christian Democratic Party	967,003	15.55	21
Nueva Mayoría	Socialist Party	691,713	11.12	15
Nueva Mayoría	Party for Democracy	685,804	11.03	15
Nueva Mayoría	Communist Party	255,914	4.11	6
Nueva Mayoría	Social Democrat Radical Party	225,955	3.63	6
Nueva Mayoría	Broad Social Movement	6,387	0.10	0
Nueva Mayoría	Independents	135,120	2.17	4
Nueva Mayoría	Total	2,967,896	47.71	67
Alliance	Independent Democratic Union	1,179,342	18.96	29
Alliance	National Renewal	928,037	14.92	19
Alliance	Independents	146,402	2.35	1
Alliance	Total	2,253,781	36.23	49
If You Want It, Chile Changes	Progressive Party	235,722	3.79	0
If You Want It, Chile Changes	Liberal Party	16,664	0.27	1
If You Want It, Chile Changes	Independents	85,437	1.37	0
If You Want It, Chile Changes	Total	337,823	5.43	1
Humanist Party		208,879	3.36	0
New Constitution for Chile	Equality Party	67,094	1.08	0
New Constitution for Chile	Green Ecologist Party	32,762	0.53	0
New Constitution for Chile	Independents	73,047	1.17	0
New Constitution for Chile	Total	172,903	2.78	0
Regionalist Party of the Independents		72,306	1.16	0
Independents		206,634	3.32	3
Total		6,220,222	100.00	120
Valid votes		6,220,222	92.86	
Invalid votes		220,868	3.30	
Blank votes		257,434	3.84	
Total votes		6,698,524	100.00	
Source: Servel

=== Regional boards ===
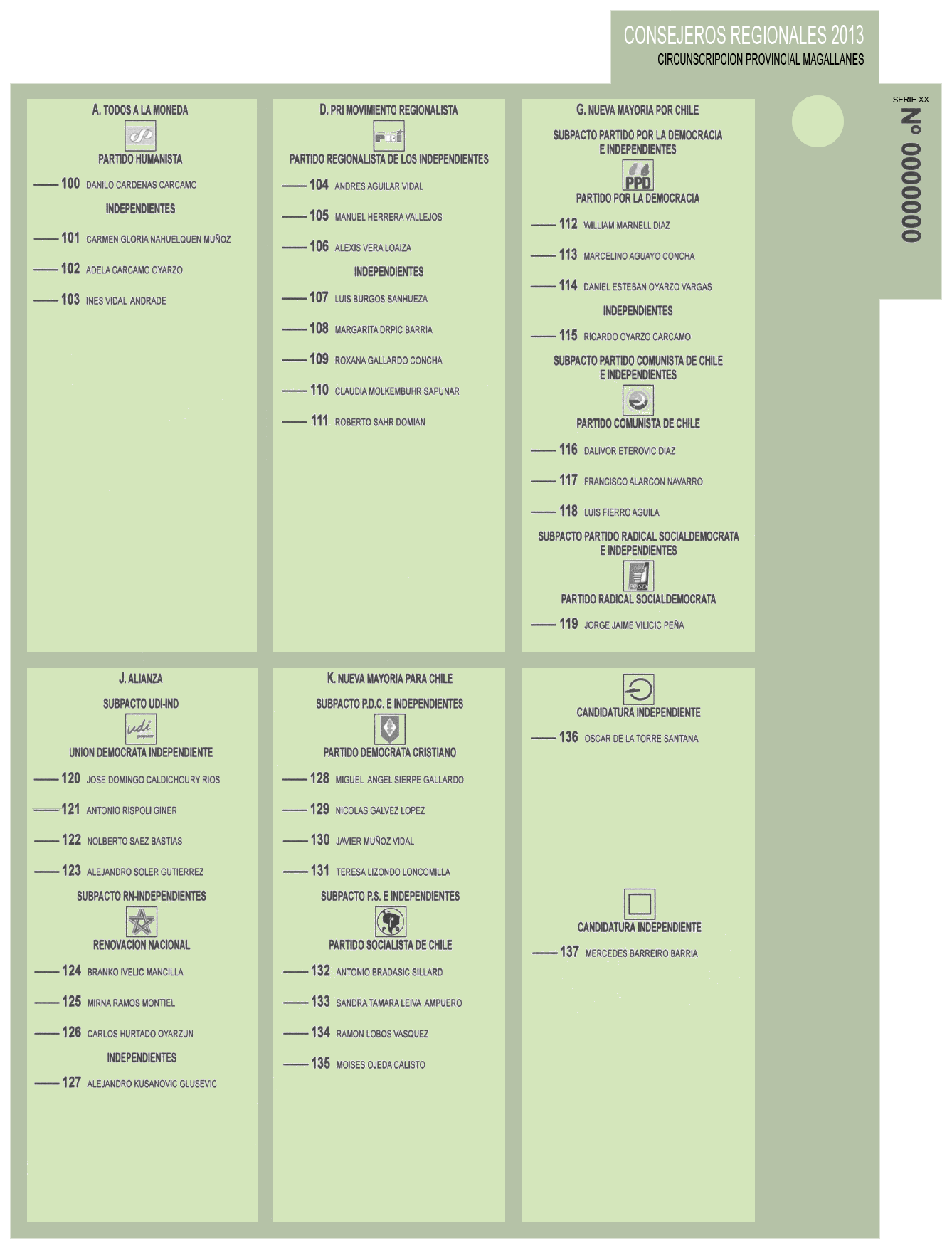
Ballot used in the regional board election in Magallanes province

Provisional results including 99.92% of ballot boxes. There were 41,349 ballot boxes for the regional boards election. The results above are a revised count made by the polling officers the following day.

Party or alliance		Votes	%	Seats
Alliance	Independent Democratic Union	822,819	14.13	47
Alliance	National Renewal	809,988	13.91	42
Alliance	Independents	246,504	4.23	13
Alliance	Total	1,879,311	32.28	102
Nueva Mayoría para Chile (Note: The New Majority coalition split into two lists for this election. The names in Spanish are similar and both translate as "New Majority for Chile". The list obtaining the most votes is called Nueva Mayoría para Chile, while the other list is called Nueva Mayoría por Chile.)	Christian Democratic Party	718,188	12.34	45
Nueva Mayoría para Chile	Socialist Party	614,178	10.55	33
Nueva Mayoría para Chile	Independents	119,683	2.06	11
Nueva Mayoría para Chile	Total	1,452,049	24.94	89
Nueva Mayoría por Chile	Party for Democracy	569,217	9.78	32
Nueva Mayoría por Chile	Communist Party	286,422	4.92	12
Nueva Mayoría por Chile	Social Democrat Radical Party	173,002	2.97	12
Nueva Mayoría por Chile	Broad Social Movement	6,602	0.11	0
Nueva Mayoría por Chile	Independents	234,670	4.03	13
Nueva Mayoría por Chile	Total	1,269,913	21.81	69
If You Want It, Chile Changes	Progressive Party	227,889	3.91	2
If You Want It, Chile Changes	Liberal Party	1,402	0.02	0
If You Want It, Chile Changes	Independents	134,114	2.30	1
If You Want It, Chile Changes	Total	363,405	6.24	3
PRI Regionalist Movement	Independent Regionalist Party	179,146	3.08	2
PRI Regionalist Movement	Independents	166,957	2.87	6
PRI Regionalist Movement	Total	346,103	5.94	8
Everyone to La Moneda	Humanist Party	99,615	1.71	0
Everyone to La Moneda	Independents	163,383	2.81	1
Everyone to La Moneda	Total	262,998	4.52	1
New Constitution for Chile	Equality Party	39,367	0.68	0
New Constitution for Chile	Green Ecologist Party	34,572	0.59	1
New Constitution for Chile	Green Ecologist Party of the North	3,930	0.07	0
New Constitution for Chile	Independents	123,128	2.11	0
New Constitution for Chile	Total	200,997	3.45	1
For the Development of the North	Northern Force	4,198	0.07	0
For the Development of the North	Independents	18,651	0.32	4
For the Development of the North	Total	22,849	0.39	4
Independents		24,576	0.42	1
Total		5,822,201	100.00	278
Valid votes		5,822,201	87.24	
Invalid votes		322,578	4.83	
Blank votes		529,132	7.93	
Total votes		6,673,911	100.00	
Source: Servel

== Reactions ==
Following the result of the first round election, Bachelet said: "We knew that it would be tough to win on the first round, we worked really hard, and we almost did it. We did win tonight, and we are going to work hard to win comfortably in December." Following the first round, both candidates offered no change in aggressive campaigning for the second round except to include young MPs elected in their campaign. Matthei did however compare her politices that of German Chancellor Angela Merkel and Bachelet's to that of the former East Germany. While Green Ecologist Party's candidate Alfredo Sfeir was the only losing first-round candidate to back one of the two second-round candidates, in his case Michelle Bachelet, independent candidate Franco Parisi said "Bachelet will be a great President, (...) Matthei would do bad for Chile, she is not to be trusted."

U.S. President Barack Obama spoke with Bachelet, while the White House issued a statement that read: "The President expressed his desire to continue strengthening the relationship between the United States and Chile, building on the close partnership he enjoyed with President-elect...The President looks forward to working closely with President-elect Bachelet to advance our shared interests in the years ahead."

=== Analysis ===
Though Bachelet's New Majority gained a majority of seats in the legislature, it failed to gain a four-sevenths majority required to pass legislation for her cornerstone education reform, which was the reason for mass mobilisation amidst the ongoing 2011–13 Chilean student protests. They also failed to get a two-thirds majority to restructure the 1981 constitution of Chile enacted during the Augusto Pinochet regime. Wake Forest political science Professor Peter Siavelis suggested: "The [congressional elections] result will surely be disappointing for Bachelet. Social movements that have spilled onto the streets are demanding reform, yet the limits of the institutional structure of Chile are going to limit her capacity to engage in reform. Even though Bachelet may be the winner tonight she is not in an enviable position." The Washington Post said that Bachelet's "legacy now rides on her ability to craft a coalition for far-reaching structural and particularly political reform." It also questioned what a low turnout could mean for her mandate, which it said was not clear enough as she had to go to a second round. The Huffington Post drew the 40th anniversary of the 11 September coup as a more than subtle backdrop to the election while saying the election was a referendum on Pinochet.
