= Green Ecologist Party (Chile) =

Defunct political party in Chile

Green Ecologist Party Partido Ecologista Verde
- Leader: Félix González Gatica
- Founded: 21 January 2008 (first iteration); 25 July 2025 (second iteration)
- Dissolved: February 7, 2022 (first iteration); February 12, 2026 (second iteration)
- Headquarters: O'Higgins N°1104, Concepción
- Membership (2009): 2,605 (12th)
- Ideology: Green politics
- Political position: Centre-left to left-wing
- International affiliation: Global Greens
- Colours: Green
- Chamber of Deputies: 0 / 155
- Senate: 0 / 50

Website
- www.ecologistas.cl

The Green Ecologist Party (Spanish: Partido Ecologista Verde, PEV) was a Chilean political party and one of South America's members of the global green movement.

== History ==
It is the first Chilean ecologist political party legalized after the disappearance of The Greens (1987–2001) and Environmentalist Movement (1993–1994), the first officially affiliated with the Global Greens.

It participated in the municipal elections of 2008 in an alliance («For a clean Chile») with the Independent Regionalist Party (PRI) and ChileFirst (CH1) movement. It managed to choose 1 councilor as an independent in the municipality of San Pedro de La Paz. In the parliamentary elections the following year it formed the New Majority for Chile pact with the Humanist Party and supported the presidential candidacy of Marco Enríquez-Ominami. In the municipal elections of 2012, it joined Change for You in conjunction with the Progressive Party.

For the presidential election of 2013, and after carrying out a process of internal primary among its members, proclaimed as presidential candidate to the economist Alfredo Sfeir, who obtained 2.35% of the vote. In parliamentary and regional councilors elections that same year participated in coalition with the Equality Party by New Constitution for Chile pact. No deputies or senators won, but won the election of Felix Gonzalez as regional councilor of the Province of Concepción.

Before the elections of 2013, the community was legalized by the name of Green Ecologist Party of North in three regions of northern Chile. Both the Green Ecologist Party North as the Green Party itself did not reach 5% of the votes, and for that reason they were dissolved by the Electoral Service. Given this, both parties decided to merge, in a process that was completed on April 15, 2014.

The party joined the Broad Front coalition for the 2017 elections, achieving its first seat in congress with its leader, Félix González as its candidate for Concepción. Its presence in the coalition lasted until 2019, when it suspended and subsequently terminated its membership over part of the groups decision of participating of an accord with the government during widespread protests.

The February 7, 2022, SERVEL announced the dissolution of several parties that did not meet the 5% minimum vote threshold at the last election to maintain registration, including the Partido Ecologista Verde. Its members in the Chamber of Deputies thereafter sat as independents.

It was dissolved again in February 2026 for failing to reach the minimum threshold of voting or parliamentary representation in the Chilean parliamentary elections of 2025.

== Presidential candidates ==
The following is a list of the presidential candidates supported by the Green Ecologist Party. (Information gathered from the Archive of Chilean Elections).

- 2009: Marco Enríquez-Ominami (lost)
- 2013: Alfredo Sfeir (lost)
- 2017: Beatriz Sánchez (lost)
- 2021: Gabriel Boric (won)

== Election results ==
=== Congress elections ===
Election year	Chamber of Deputies			Senate			Status
Election year	# Votes	% Votes	Seats	# Votes	% Votes	Seats	Status
2025	88,431	0.83%	0 / 155	21,325	0.69%	0 / 50	Extra-parliamentary
