= Alfredo Sfeir =

Chilean diplomat, economist (born 1947)

Alfredo Sfeir-Younis
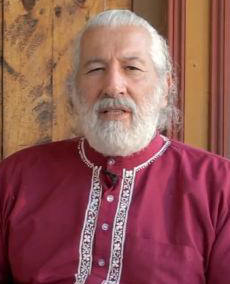
- Sfeir-Younis in 2013

Personal details
- Born: Alfredo Juan Sfeir Younis; 26 September 1947 (age 79) Santiago, Chile
- Party: Independent
- Domestic partner: María Camarena Orengo (1972–1985)
- Relations: Alberto Nacif Sfeir Sfeir (father); Inés Younis Mattar (mother)
- Children: 3
- Education: University of Chile (B.A., Commercial Engineer, 1970); University of Rhode Island (M.Sc., 1974); University of Wisconsin–Madison (M.Sc., Ph.D., 1976)
- Occupation: Economist, diplomat, spiritual teacher, author
- Known for: World Bank's first environmental economist Founder, Zambuling Institute for Human Transformation; Founder, Latin American Network of Socially Engaged Buddhism (LANSEB); Integration of human rights into development economics Buddhist Social Doctrine
- Website: alfredosfeiryounis.com

Alfredo Sfeir Younis (born 1947) is a Chilean economist and spiritual leader. He was nominated for the Chilean presidency by the Green Ecologist Party in the 2013 Chilean general election, where he placed sixth with 2.35% of the vote.

== Education ==
Sfeir studied economics at the University of Chile, and obtained his master's and doctorate degrees at the University of Rhode Island and University of Wisconsin, respectively.
