= Equality Party (Chile) =

Defunct political party in Chile

Equality Party Partido Igualdad
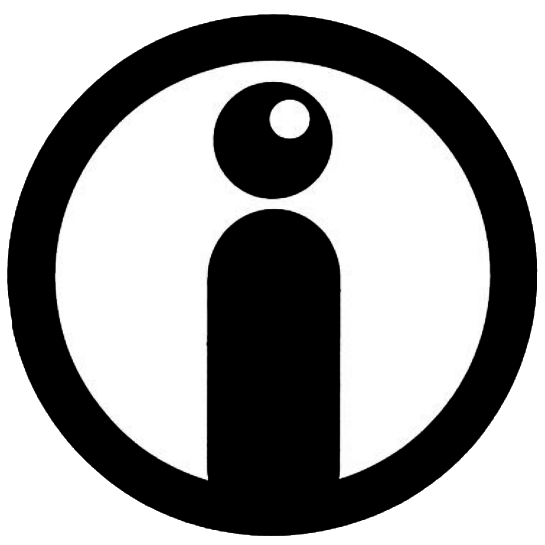
- President: Guillermo González Castro
- Founded: 2009
- Dissolved: February 2022; 12 February 2026
- Headquarters: Aviador Zañartu 2389; Conchalí
- Ideology: Socialism of the 21st century Marxism; Left-wing populism Anti-capitalism; Anti-imperialism
- Political position: Left-wing
- National affiliation: Popular Ecologist Left (2024–); Dignidad Ahora (2020–2022); New Constitution for Chile (2013); United People (2015-2016); Broad Front (2017-2019); Chile Digno (2021); Apruebo Dignidad (2021)
- Regional affiliation: São Paulo Forum
- Colours: Black and White

Website
- www.partidoigualdad.cl
- Politics of Chile; Political parties; Elections; a: Currently, this party is de facto active and in the process of legalization

The Equality Party (Spanish: Partido Igualdad) was a left-wing political party in Chile. It was founded in 2009 by various social movements of workers, students, mortgage borrowers, townspeople and human rights organizations, among other actors. Its first president was former communist councilor of Peñalolen, Lautaro Guanca.

Legally registered in 2012, it first appeared in the municipal elections of that year. Reaching 0.81% of the vote, it got the election of one councilor.

For the 2013 elections, the party proclaimed Roxana Miranda as its presidential candidate. The party joined the Broad Front and supported Beatriz Sánchez for President in 2017, winning a seat in the lower house.

The party was deregistered in February 2022 because it did not receive at least 5% of the votes in the 2021 parliamentary elections to maintain its legality.

== Presidential candidates ==
The following is a list of the presidential candidates supported by the Equality Party. (Information gathered from the Archive of Chilean Elections).

- 2013: Roxana Miranda (lost)
- 2017: Beatriz Sánchez (lost)
- 2021: none

== Election results ==
=== Presidential ===
Election	Candidate	First round		Second round		Result
Election	Candidate	Votes	%	Votes	%	Result
2013	Roxana Miranda	81,873	1.24 (#7)			Lost ✗
2017	Beatriz Sánchez (Note: The party was a member of Broad Front and supported its candidate)	1,338,037	20.27 (#3)			Lost ✗
2021	Did not contest					Lost ✗

=== Parliamentary ===
Election	Leader	Senate				Chamber of Deputies				Government
Election	Leader	Votes	%	Seats	+/–	Votes	%	Seats	+/–	Government
2013	Roxana Miranda	70,692	1.57 (#10) (Note: The party was a member of New Constitution for Chile that received 2.78% votes and came 5th)	0 / 38		67,094	1.08 (#12) (Note: The party was a member of New Constitution for Chile that received 3.90% votes and came 3rd)	0 / 120		Extra-parliamentary
2017	Guillermo González	26,640	1.60 (#14) (Note: The party was a member of Broad Front that received 11.06% votes and came 4th)	0 / 43	0	129,232	2.16 (#12) (Note: The party was a member of Broad Front that received 16.49% votes and came 3rd)	1 / 120	▲1	Opposition
2021	Guillermo González	82,785	1.78 (#15) (Note: The party was a member of Dignidad Ahora)	0 / 43	0	127,506	2.01 (Note: The party was a member of Dignidad Ahora)	0 / 120	▼1	Extra-parliamentary
2025	Guillermo González	4,795	0.15	0 / 43	0	79,871	0.75	0 / 120	▼1	Extra-parliamentary

=== Constitutional Convention ===
Election	Leader	Votes	%	Seats	+/–	Majority
2021	Guillermo González	67,556	1.18 (#16) (Note: The party was a member of Apruebo Dignidad that received 18.74% votes and came 2nd)	1 / 155	New	AD+LdP+LdA+INN
