= Ricardo Israel =

Chilean politician (born 1950)

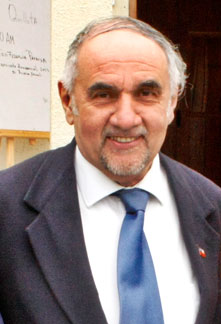
- Israel in 2013.

Personal details
- Born: Ricardo Jacob Israel Zipper; October 7, 1950 (age 75) Los Ángeles, Chile
- Party: Regionalist Party of the Independents
- Spouse: Sara Cofré
- Children: 2
- Education: University of Chile
- Occupation: Lawyer
- Known for: Candidate for President of Chile (2013)
- Website: Ricardo Israel 2014

Ricardo Jacob Israel Zipper (born 7 October 1950) is a Chilean lawyer and academic. Israel was a candidate for President of Chile in 2013, representing the Regionalist Party of the Independents (PRI), but lost the election obtaining 0.57 per cent of the vote.

== Education ==
Israel completed his university studies in 1981 at the Law Faculty of the University of Chile, becoming a lawyer. He has a master in Latin American Government and Politics, and a doctorate in political science at the University of Essex, and a degree in law at the University of Barcelona.

== Personal life ==
Israel is married to Sara Cofré, has two children (Daniela and Igal), and three grandsons (Vicente, Julián, and Dalia).
