= If You Want It, Chile Changes =

Chilean political coalition

If You Want It, Chile Changes Si tú quieres, Chile cambia
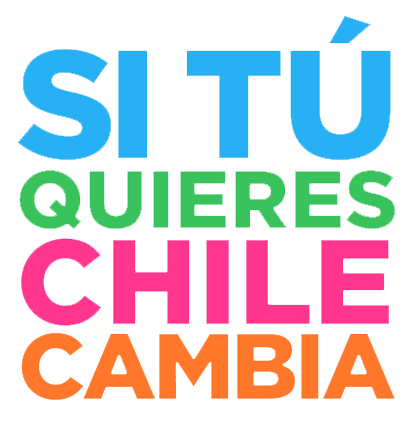
- Leader: Marco Enríquez-Ominami
- Founded: 19 August 2013
- Headquarters: Santiago de Chile
- Ideology: Progressivism; Liberalism
- Political position: Centre to centre-left

If You Want It, Chile Changes (Spanish: Si tú quieres, Chile cambia) was a Chilean electoral coalition that brought together a group of Chilean opposition parties (centre to centre-left) to the Chilean presidential, parliamentary and regional advisors elections in 2013. It supported the presidential candidacy of Marco Enríquez-Ominami, who lost the election.

== Composition ==
The coalition consisted of two political parties and other minor political movements.

Party	Spanish	Leader
Progressive Party	Partido Progresista	Marco Enríquez-Ominami
Liberal Party	Partido Liberal de Chile	Vlado Mirosevic
