= Marcel Claude =

Chilean economist, academic and political activist

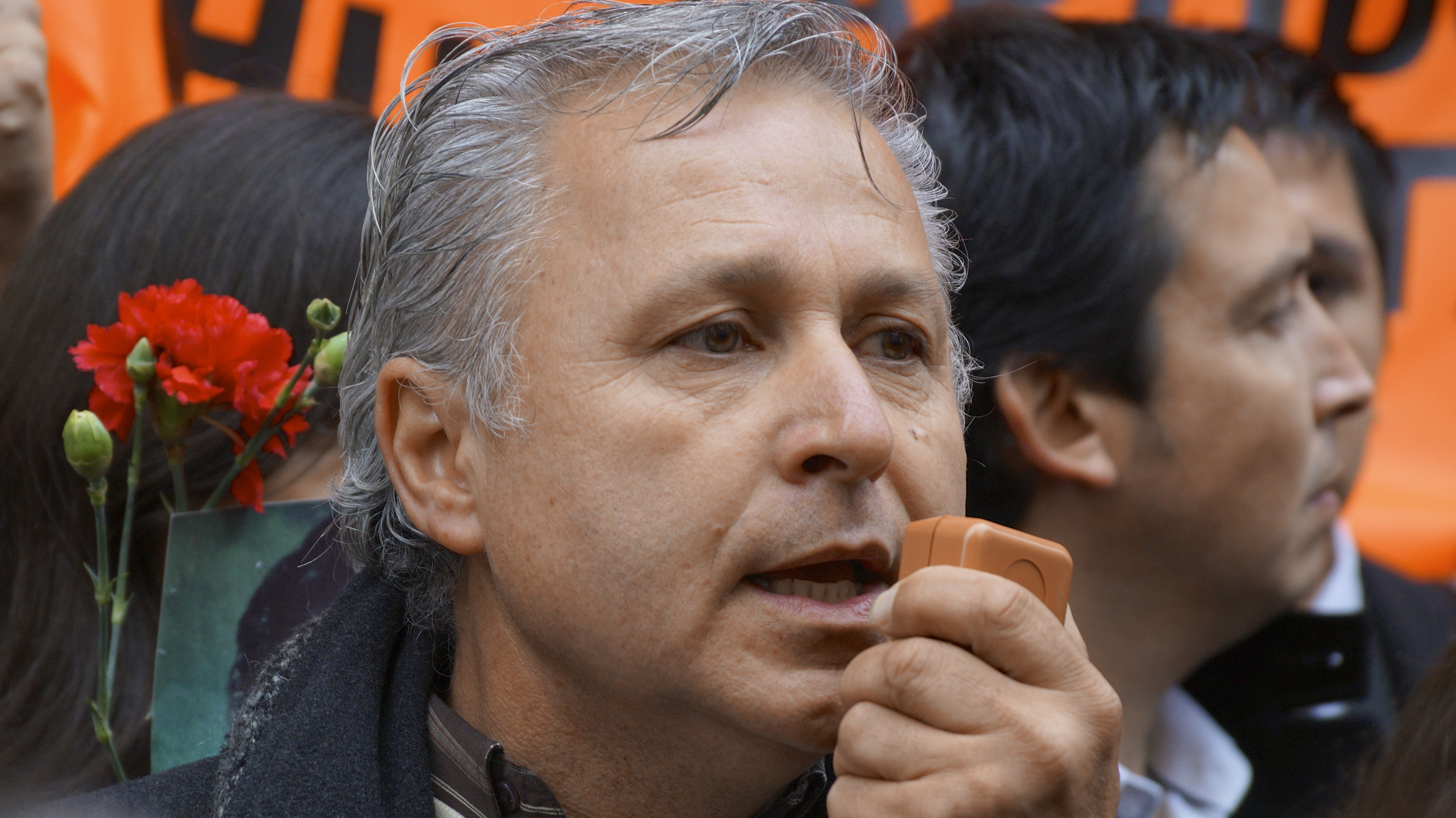
- Claude in 2013

Personal details
- Born: Marcel Henri Claude Reyes; 26 February 1957 (age 69) Santiago, Chile
- Party: Independent; Pro-Humanist Party (2013–); Party for Democracy (1990–95); Christian Democrat Youth of Chile (until 1973)
- Education: University of Chile
- Occupation: Economist, academician, politician
- Known for: Candidate for President of Chile (2014–18)
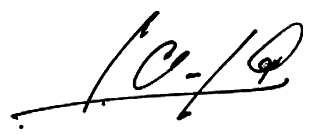
- Signature
- Website: todosalamoneda.cl

Marcel Henri Claude Reyes (born in Santiago, Chile on 26 February 1957) is a Chilean economist, academic, and political activist. He was an independent candidate to become President of Chile in the 2013 Chilean presidential election, and was endorsed by the Humanist Party.

Previously, Claude worked at the Central Bank of Chile between 1983 and 1995, and later directed two Chilean environmental NGOs.

== Early life ==
Claude was born on 26 February 1957 in Santiago de Chile to Rolande Hugo Claude Dellepiane, a native of Concepción, and Leyla del Carmen Reyes Maluje.

In 1975, he enrolled in the University of Chile, and graduated in 1982 with a degree in economics. After that, he got an educational scholarship at the Université catholique de Louvain, Belgium, in 1986 and got a degree in Master of Arts in 1987. At the same university, he was a candidate for a Doctorate in Economy Science.

On 25 July 1986, he married Oriella Celsi Tasso.

== Professional career ==
=== Central Bank of Chile ===
Claude started his career at the Central Bank of Chile in 1983. He served as an economic analyst and wrote reports regarding external debt and possible solutions to this problem, among other themes. He wrote a seminal report on the state of external debt in Latin America, among others. During this period he was a professor of economic development at the Catholic University of Valparaíso.

=== Environmentalist NGOs ===
In 1997, after completing his work at the Central Bank, Claude created the Terram Foundation, whose objective was to promote sustainable development in Chile.

In April 2003, he became the executive director of the Office for South America and Antarctica of Oceana.
