= Nueva Mayoría =

Chilean political coalition

New Majority Nueva Mayoría
- Leader: Michelle Bachelet
- Founded: 30 April 2013
- Dissolved: 11 March 2018
- Preceded by: Concertación
- Succeeded by: Progressive Convergence
- Headquarters: Santiago de Chile
- Ideology: Big tent Social democracy Progressivism; Christian democracy
- Political position: Centre-left

Election symbol
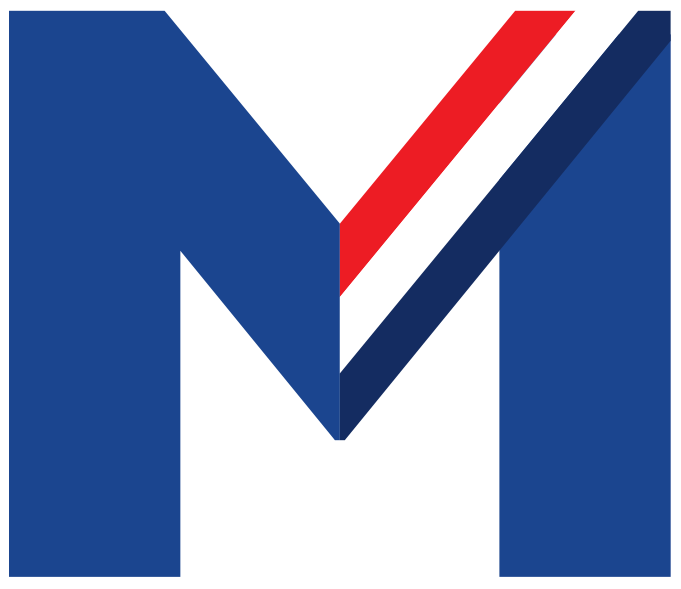

Party flag

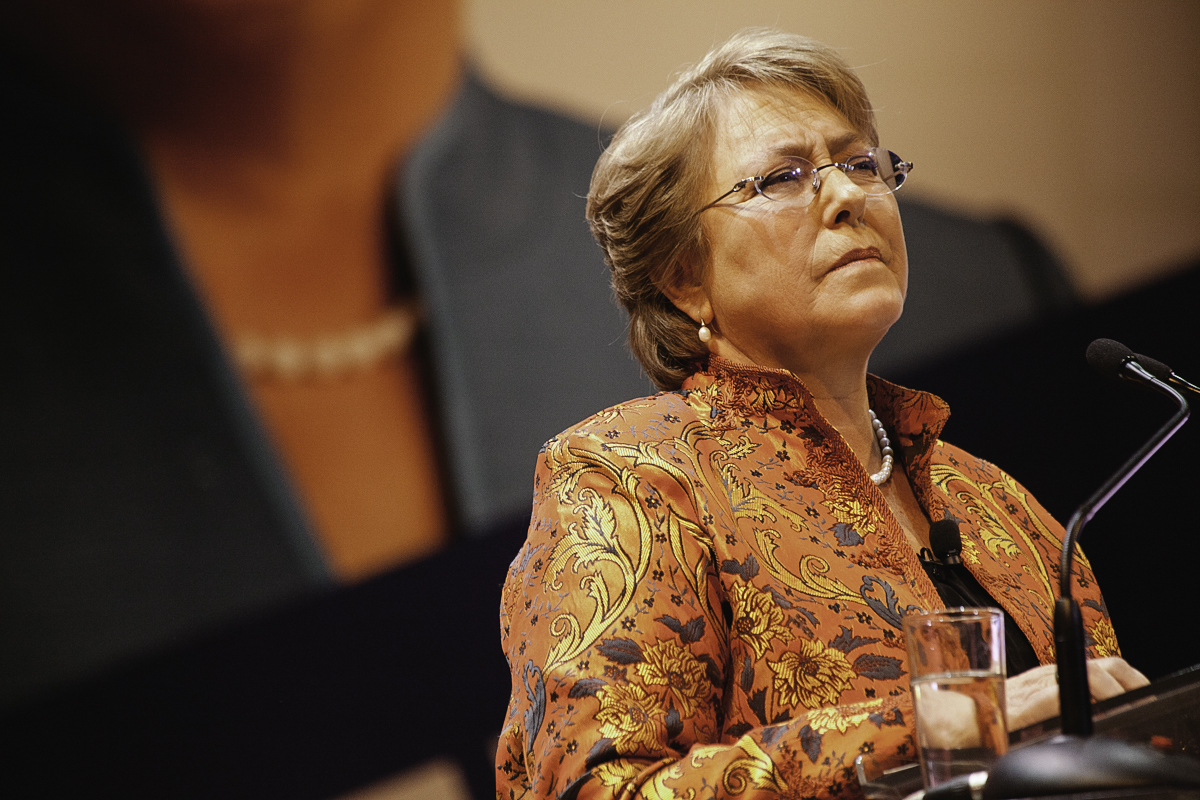
Michelle Bachelet, presidential candidate and leader of the Nueva Mayoría.

The Nueva Mayoría (Spanish pronunciation: [ˈnweβa maʝoˈɾi.a]), also translated in English as New Majority, was a Chilean centre-left electoral coalition from 2013 to 2018, composed mainly of centre-left political parties supporting the presidential candidacy of Michelle Bachelet in the 2013 election.

== Political objectives ==
Michelle Bachelet stated that a principal objective of the Nueva Mayoría coalition was to achieve and establish a system of universal and free access to higher education within a time frame of six years.

The first time the name of the new coalition was mentioned on 27 March 2013, when Bachelet agreed to be presidential candidate for the primary coalition. On that occasion, she asked that her eventual administration was "the first government of a new social majority".

== Composition ==
The coalition consisted of the four principal parties of the Concert of Parties for Democracy, namely, the Socialist Party of Chile (PS), the Christian Democratic Party (Chile) (PDC), the Party for Democracy (PPD) and the Social Democrat Radical Party (PRSD). In addition, the Nueva Mayoría also included the Communist Party of Chile (PCCh), the Citizen Left (IC), the Broad Social Movement (MAS) and centre-left independents. In March 2014, the regionalist Northern Force Party joined the Nueva Mayoría to merge with the Broad Social Movement and found the MAS Region.

Party	Spanish	Main ideology	Leader
MAS Region	MAS Región	Democratic socialism	Cristián Tapia
Christian Democratic Party	Partido Demócrata Cristiano	Christian democracy	Carolina Goić
Citizen Left	Izquierda Ciudadana	Christian socialism	Francisco Parraguez
Communist Party	Partido Comunista	Communism	Guillermo Teillier
Party for Democracy	Partido por la Democracia	Social democracy Progressivism	Gonzalo Navarrete
Social Democrat Radical Party	Partido Radical Socialdemócrata	Social democracy	Ernesto Velasco
Socialist Party	Partido Socialista	Democratic socialism	Álvaro Elizalde

== Presidential elections ==
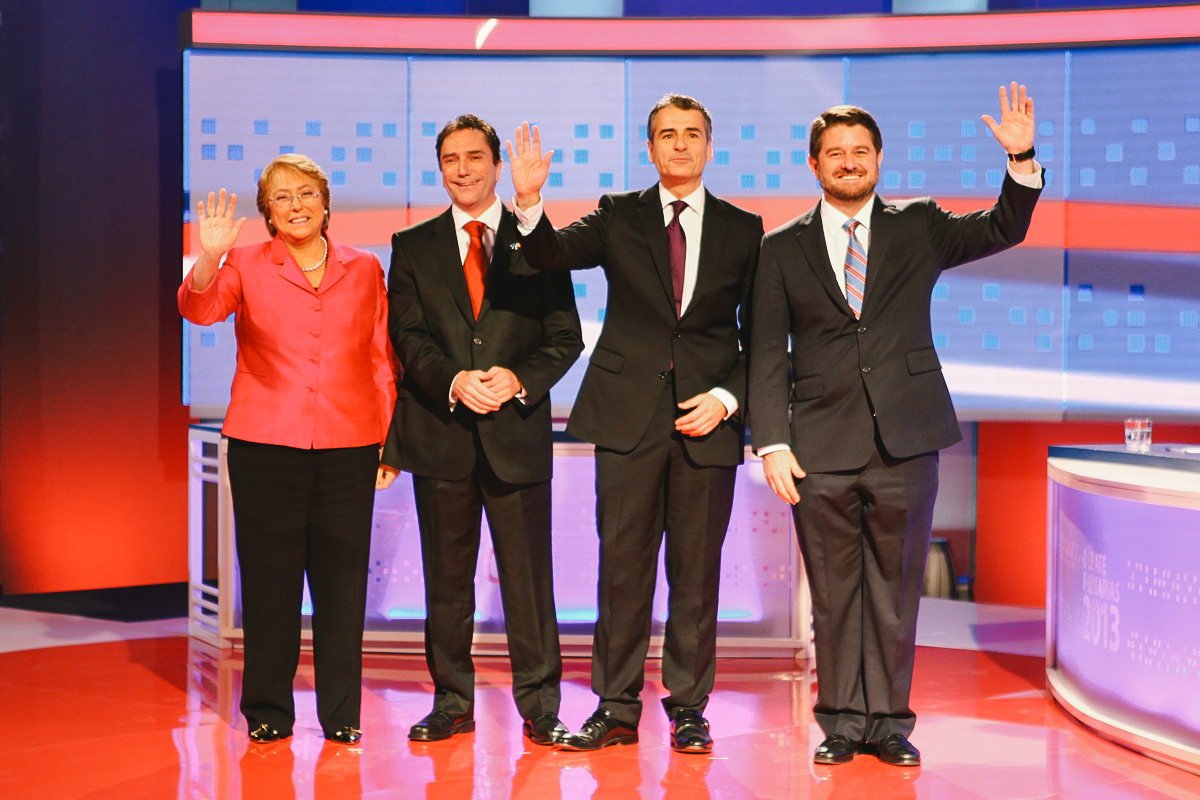
Presidential primary candidates of the Nueva Mayoría

The Nueva Mayoría coalition was registered on 30 April 2013 with the Chilean Electoral Service (SERVEL).

The coalition held its primaries on 30 June, where Michelle Bachelet (PS) won with 73% of the vote to become the sole presidential candidate of the bloc, defeating the independent Andrés Velasco, who won 13% of the preferences, to Claudio Orrego (PDC), which stood at 8.86%, and radical José Antonio Gómez, who reached 5.06%. The pact got more than two million votes from a total of three million voters, tripling the votes obtained by the Alliance.

Initially, the coalition intended to hold its parliamentary primary elections on 30 June 2013; however, this was annulled because parties failed to reach an agreement regarding their nomination. After several negotiations, an agreement was reached to commence partial and complete primaries in some districts on 4 August 2013.

After the primaries, Bachelet went straight to the election process, in which she competed with eight other candidates, the highest number in Chilean electoral history. In those elections, the leader of the coalition achieved a 46.70% of votes, not enough for an absolute majority nationwide, so she had to face a runoff with the candidate of the Alliance, Evelyn Matthei, where finally she won with 62.16% of the vote. This victory marked the first re-election of a woman in office, in addition to the return of the centre-left government after four years of the administration of Sebastián Piñera. In December 2017 the Nueva Mayoría presidential candidate, Alejandro Guillier, was defeated by Chile Vamos candidate Sebastián Piñera, who was returning to the government. The Nueva Mayoría coalition dissolved on 11 March 2018, at the end of Bachelet's term and the inauguration of Piñera.
