= List of members of the Chilean Constitutional Convention =

The following 155 representatives were members of the Chilean Constitutional Convention, organ whose relevance in the History of Chile consists in being the first of a democratic kind when drafting a constitution.

These people make up the Constitutional Convention whose goal is draft a new text in replace of the 1980 Constitution. On 15 June 2021, the Tribunal Calificador de Elecciones («Tricel», Election Qualifying Court) released the official list of conventionals.

== Reserved seats ==
Mapuche

- Francisca Linconao (Independent)
- Natividad Llanquileo (Independent)
- Adolfo Millabur (Independent)
- Rosa Catrileo (Independent)
- Victorino Antilef (Independent)
- Alexis Caiguan (Independent)
- Elisa Loncón (Independent)

Rapanui

- Tiare Aguilera Hey (Independent)

Atacameño

- Félix Galleguillos (Independent)

Aimara

- Isabella Mamani (Independent)
- Luis Jiménez Cáceres (Independent)

Quechua

- Wilfredo Bacián (Independent)

Colla

- Isabel Godoy (Independent)

Diaguita

- Eric Chinga (Independent)

Kawashkar

- Margarita Vargas López (Independent)

Yagan

- Lidia González (Independent)

Chango

- Fernando Tirado Soto (Independent)

== District 1 ==
Arica, Camarones, General Lagos y Putre.

- Carolina Videla (Communist Party)
- Pollyana Rivera (Close to Republican Party)
- Jorge Abarca Riveros (Close to Liberal Party)

== District 2 ==
Alto Hospicio, Camiña, Colchane, Huara, Iquique, Pica y Pozo Almonte.

- Hugo Gutiérrez Galvez (Communist Party)
- Álvaro Jofré (Renovación Nacional)
- Alejandra Flores Carlos (Independent)

== District 3 ==
Calama, María Elena, Ollagüe, San Pedro de Atacama, Tocopilla, Antofagasta, Mejillones, Sierra Gorda y Taltal.

- Cristina Dorador (Independent)
- Dayana González (The List of the People)
- Pablo Toloza (UDI)
- Hernán Velásquez (Social Green Regionalist Federation)

== District 4 ==
Chañaral, Copiapó, Diego de Almagro, Alto del Carmen, Caldera, Huasco, Freirina, Tierra Amarilla y Vallenar.

- Ericka Portilla (Communist Party)
- Constanza San Juan (Independent)
- Guillermo Namor Kong (Independent)
- Maximiliano Hurtado (Close to Socialist Party)

== District 5 ==
Andacollo, La Higuera, La Serena, Paihuano, Vicuña, Coquimbo, Ovalle, Río Hurtado, Canela, Combarbalá, Illapel, Los Vilos, Monte Patria, Punitaqui y Salamanca.

- Ivanna Olivares (Independent)
- Jeniffer Mella (Independent)
- Carlos Calvo Muñoz (Socialist Party)
- Daniel Bravo Silva (Independent)
- Roberto Vega Campusano (Renovación Nacional)
- María Trinidad Castillo (Independent)

== District 6 ==
Cabildo, La Calera, Hijuelas, La Cruz, La Ligua, Nogales, Papudo, Petorca, Puchuncaví, Quillota, Quintero, Zapallar, Calle Larga, Catemu, Llay-Llay, Los Andes, Panquehue, Putaendo, Rinconada, San Esteban, San Felipe, Santa María, Limache, Olmué, Quilpué y Villa Alemana.

- Carolina Vilches (Commons)
- Mariela Serey (Social Convergence)
- Lisette Vergara (The List of the People)
- Ruggero Cozzi (Renovación Nacional)
- Janis Meneses (The List of the People)
- Claudio Gómez (Socialist Party)
- Cristóbal Andrade (The List of the People)
- Miguel Ángel Botto (Independent)

== District 7 ==
Isla de Pascua, Juan Fernández, Valparaíso, Concón, Viña del Mar, Algarrobo, Cartagena, Casablanca, El Quisco, El Tabo, San Antonio y Santo Domingo.

- Jaime Bassa (Close to Social Convergence)
- Jorge Arancibia (Independent to Republican Party)
- Camila Zárate Zárate (The List of the People)
- Agustín Squella (Independent to Liberal Party)
- Tania Madriaga (The List of the People)
- Raúl Celis Montt (Renovación Nacional)
- María José Oyarzún (Democratic Revolution)

== District 8 ==
Colina, Lampa, Quilicura, Pudahuel, Til Til, Cerrillos, Estación Central y Maipú.

- Daniel Stingo (Democratic Revolution)
- Bernardo de la Maza (Close to Evópoli)
- Marco Arellano (Close to The List of the People)
- María Rivera (The List of the People)
- Valentina Miranda (Communist Party)
- Tatiana Urrutia (Democratic Revolution)
- Bessy Gallardo (Close to Progressive Party)

== District 9 ==
Conchalí, Huechuraba, Renca, Cerro Navia, Lo Prado, Quinta Normal, Independencia y Recoleta.

- Rodrigo Logan (Party of the People)
- Bárbara Sepúlveda Hales (Communist Party)
- Natalia Henríquez (The List of the People)
- Alejandra Pérez Espina (The List of the People)
- Arturo Zúñiga (Unión Demócrata Independiente)
- César Valenzuela Maass (Socialist Party)

== District 10 ==
Santiago, Ñuñoa, Providencia, La Granja, Macul y San Joaquín.

- Fernando Atria (Democratic Revolution)
- Teresa Marinovic (Close to Republican Party)
- Patricia Politzer (Non-Neutral Independents)
- Jorge Baradit (Close to Socialist Party)
- Cristián Monckeberg (Renovación Nacional)
- Manuel Woldarsky (The List of the People)
- Giovanna Roa (Democratic Revolution)

== District 11 ==
Las Condes, Lo Barnechea, Vitacura, La Reina y Peñalolén.

- Marcela Cubillos (Unión Demócrata Independiente)
- Hernán Larraín Matte (Evópoli)
- Constanza Schönhaut (Social Convergence)
- Constanza Hube (Unión Demócrata Independiente)
- Bernardo Fontaine (Close to Renovación Nacional)
- Patricio Fernández (Close to Liberal Party)

== District 12 ==
La Florida, Puente Alto, La Pintana, Pirque y San José de Maipo.

- Benito Baranda (Close to Non-Neutral Independents)
- Beatriz Sánchez (Close to Democratic Revolution)
- Alondra Carrillo (Independent)
- Giovanna Grandón (The List of the People)
- Manuel José Ossandón Lira (Renovación Nacional)
- Juan José Martin Bravo (Non-Neutral Independents)

== District 13 ==
El Bosque, La Cisterna, San Ramón, Lo Espejo, Pedro Aguirre Cerda y San Miguel.

- Malucha Pinto (Socialist Party)
- Ingrid Villena (The List of the People)
- Rodrigo Rojas Vade (The List of the People)
- Marcos Barraza (Communist Party)

== District 14 ==
Buin, Calera de Tango, Paine, San Bernardo, Alhué, Curacaví, El Monte, Isla de Maipo, María Pinto, Melipilla, Padre Hurtado, Peñaflor, San Pedro y Talagante.

- Ignacio Achurra (Social Convergence)
- Francisco Caamaño Rojas (The List of the People)
- Renato Garín (Radical Party)
- Paulina Valenzuela (Non-Neutral Independents)
- Claudia Castro Gutiérrez (Unión Demócrata Independiente)

== District 15 ==
Rancagua, Codegua, Coinco, Coltauco, Doñihue, Graneros, Machalí, Malloa, Mostazal, Olivar, Quinta de Tilcoco, Rengo y Requínoa.

- Loreto Vallejos (The List of the People)
- Alvin Saldaña (Independent)
- Carol Bown (Unión Demócrata Independiente)
- Matías Orellana (Socialist Party)
- Damaris Abarca (Social Convergence)

== District 16 ==
Chimbarongo, Las Cabras, Peumo, Pichidegua, San Fernando, San Vicente de Tagua Tagua, Chépica, La Estrella, Litueche, Lolol, Marchihue, Nancagua, Navidad, Palmilla, Paredones, Peralillo, Pichilemu, Placilla, Pumanque y Santa Cruz.

- Ricardo Neumann (Unión Demócrata Independiente)
- Nicolás Núñez Gangas (Independent)
- Gloria Alvarado (The List of the People)
- Adriana Cancino (Socialist Party)

== District 17 ==
Curicó, Hualañé, Licantén, Molina, Rauco, Romeral, Sagrada Familia, Teno, Vichuquén, Talca, Constitución, Curepto, Empedrado, Maule, Pelarco, Pencahue, Río Claro, San Clemente y San Rafael.

- Roberto Celedón Fernández (Social Green Regionalist Federation)
- Bárbara Rebolledo (Evópoli)
- María Elisa Quinteros (Independent)
- Alfredo Moreno Echeverría (Unión Demócrata Independiente)
- Christian Viera (Close to Christian Democrat Party)
- Elsa Labraña (The List of the People)
- Paola Grandón (Social Green Regionalist Federation)

== District 18 ==
Colbún, Linares, San Javier de Loncomilla, Villa Alegre, Yerbas Buenas, Cauquenes, Chanco, Longaví, Parral, Pelluhue y Retiro.

- Patricia Labra (Renovación Nacional)
- Francisca Arauna (The List of the People)
- Ricardo Montero Allende (Socialist Party)
- Fernando Salinas Manfredini (The List of the People)

== District 19 ==
Bulnes, Cobquecura, Coelemu, Ñiquén, Portezuelo, Quillón, Quirihue, Ninhue, Ránquil, San Carlos, San Fabián, San Nicolás, Treguaco, Chillán, Chillán Viejo, Coihueco, El Carmen, Pemuco, Pinto, San Ignacio y Yungay.

- Martín Arrau (Unión Demócrata Independiente)
- César Uribe Araya (The List of the People)
- Felipe Harboe (Party for Democracy)
- Carolina Sepúlveda Sepúlveda (The List of the People)
- Margarita Letelier Cortés (Unión Demócrata Independiente)

== District 20 ==
Hualpén, Talcahuano, Chiguayante, Concepción, San Pedro de la Paz, Coronel, Florida, Hualqui, Penco, Santa Juana y Tomé.

- Amaya Alvez (Democratic Revolution)
- Rocío Cantuarias (Close to Evópoli)
- Loreto Vidal (The List of the People)
- Andrés Cruz Carrasco (Close to Socialist Party)
- Tammy Pustilnick (Non-Neutral Independents)
- Bastián Labbé (Independent)
- Luciano Silva Mora (Renovación Nacional)

== District 21 ==
Arauco, Cabrero, Cañete, Contulmo, Curanilahue, Los Álamos, Lebu, Lota, Tirúa, Alto Biobío, Antuco, Laja, Los Ángeles, Mulchén, Nacimiento, Negrete, Quilaco, Quilleco, San Rosendo, Santa Bárbara, Tucapel y Yumbel.

- Vanessa Hoppe (Communist Party)
- Paulina Veloso Muñoz (Renovación Nacional)
- Luis Barceló Amado (Close to Party for Democracy)
- Javier Fuchslocher (Non-Neutral Independents)

== District 22 ==
Angol, Collipulli, Ercilla, Los Sauces, Lumaco, Purén, Renaico, Traiguén, Curacautín, Galvarino, Lautaro, Lonquimay, Melipeuco, Perquenco, Victoria y Vilcún.

- Fuad Chahín (Christian Democratic Party)
- Eduardo Cretton (Unión Demócrata Independiente)
- Ruth Hurtado (Close to Renovación Nacional)

== District 23 ==
Padre Las Casas, Temuco, Carahue, Cholchol, Freire, Nueva Imperial, Pitrufquén, Saavedra, Teodoro Schmidt, Cunco, Curarrehue, Gorbea, Loncoche, Pucón, Toltén y Villarrica.

- Luis Mayol (Renovación Nacional)
- Manuela Royo Letelier (Equality Party)
- Helmuth Martínez (The List of the People)
- Eduardo Castillo Vigouroux (Party for Democracy)
- Lorena Céspedes (The List of the People)
- Angélica Tepper (Close to Renovación Nacional)

== District 24 ==
Corral, Lanco, Máfil, Mariquina, Valdivia, Futrono, La Unión, Lago Ranco, Los Lagos, Paillaco, Panguipulli y Río Bueno.

- Ramona Reyes (Socialist Party)
- Pedro Muñoz Leiva (Socialist Party)
- Felipe Mena Villar (Unión Demócrata Independiente)
- Aurora Delgado (Close to Democratic Revolution)

== District 25 ==
Osorno, San Juan de la Costa, San Pablo, Fresia, Frutillar, Llanquihue, Los Muermos, Puerto Octay, Puerto Varas, Puyehue, Purranque y Río Negro.

- Harry Jürgensen (Renovación Nacional)
- María Cecilia Ubilla (Unión Demócrata Independiente)
- Mario Vargas Vidal (Socialist Party)

== District 26 ==
Calbuco, Cochamó, Maullín, Puerto Montt, Ancud, Castro, Chaitén, Chonchi, Curaco de Vélez, Dalcahue, Futaleufú, Hualaihué, Palena, Puqueldón, Queilén, Quellón, Quemchi y Quinchao.

- Julio Álvarez Pinto (Socialist Party)
- Katerine Montealegre (Unión Demócrata Independiente)
- Adriana Ampuero (The List of the People)
- Gaspar Domínguez (Non-Neutral Independents)

== District 27 ==
Aysén, Cisnes, Chile Chico, Coyhaique, Cochrane, Guaitecas, Lago Verde, Río Ibáñez, O'Higgins y Tortel.

- Tomás Laibe (Socialist Party)
- Geoconda Navarrete (Evópoli)
- Yarela Gómez (Social Convergence)

== District 28 ==
Antártica, Cabo de Hornos, Laguna Blanca, Natales, Porvenir, Primavera, Punta Arenas, Río Verde, San Gregorio, Timaukel y Torres del Paine.

- Mauricio Daza (Independent)
- Rodrigo Álvarez Zenteno (Unión Demócrata Independiente)
- Elisa Giustinianovic (The List of the People)
