= Volodarsky (surname) =

Volodarsky (Russian: Володарский); transliteration variants: Volodarski, Wolodarsky, Wolodarski) is a Russian-language toponymic surname. It may be a Jewish surname derived from the place name Volodarka, or the Russian-language variant of the name a Polish place named Włodarka since the times when Poland was part of the Russian Empire. Accordingly, the corresponding Polish-language surname is Włodarski.

Notable people with the surname include:

- Boris Volodarsky (born 1955), English historian, specialising in Intelligence History
- Eduard Volodarsky (1941–2012), Russian screenwriter, playwright and cinematographer
- Igal Volodarsky (1936–1977), Israeli basketball player
- Leonid Volodarsky (born 1950), Russian movie translator
- Peter Wolodarski (born 1978), Swedish journalist and television host
- V. Volodarsky (1891–1918), Russian revolutionary and early Soviet politician
- Wallace Wolodarsky, American screenwriter, television producer, film director, and actor

== See also ==
- Manuel Woldarsky, Chilean political activist
