= Fernando Salinas Manfredini =

Chilean constituent

Fernando Salinas
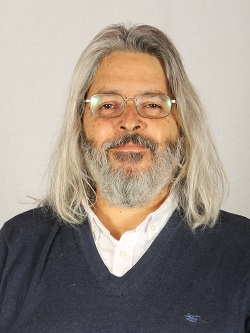

Member of the Constitutional Convention
- In office 4 July 2021 – 4 July 2022
- Constituency: 18th District

Personal details
- Born: 2 March 1956 (age 70) Santiago, Chile
- Other political affiliations: The List of the People
- Spouse: Marina Trentini
- Parent(s): Carlos Salinas; Levinia Manfredini
- Education: University of Chile (B.A. in Civil Engineering) (M.A. in Philosophy)

Fernando Salinas Manfredini (born 2 March 1956) is a Chilean civil engineer.

He served as a member of the Constitutional Convention, representing the 18th electoral district of the Maule Region.

== Biography ==
Salinas Manfredini was born on 2 March 1956 in Santiago. He is the son of Carlos Roberto Salinas Verdugo and Levinia Manfredini González. He is married to Marisa Trentini Tavonatti.

He completed his secondary education at Instituto Miguel León Prado. He studied civil engineering at the University of Chile and later obtained a Master’s degree in Philosophy from the same institution.

An ecologist and environmental activist, he produced Chile’s first ecological documentary, El Despertar de la Conciencia (1989). He has participated in numerous environmental campaigns, particularly in southern Maule, including opposition to the Los Robles thermoelectric power plant on the Maule coast, where he served as coordinator. He has been a member of the Committee for the Defense of Flora and Fauna (CODEFF) since 1993 and of Acción Ciudadana Costa Maule.

== Political career ==
Salinas Manfredini has been the coordinator of the Friends of Tibet movement, associated with the International Tibet Network, which advocates for the defence of human rights in Tibet following the Chinese invasion of 1959. He served as executive secretary for the visit of the Dalai Lama to Chile in 2006.

In the elections held on 15–16 May 2021, he ran as an independent candidate for the Constitutional Convention representing the 18th electoral district of the Maule Region as part of the La Lista del Pueblo (LdP) electoral pact, receiving 7,414 votes (6.7% of the validly cast votes).

On 2 September 2021, he resigned to LdP together with Francisca Arauna.
