= María José Oyarzún =

Chilean constituent

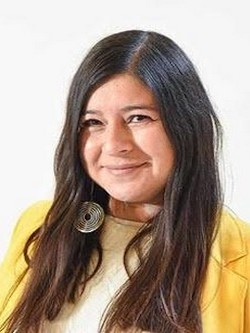

Member of the Constitutional Convention
- In office 4 July 2021 – 4 July 2022
- Constituency: 7th District

Personal details
- Born: 23 October 1982 (age 43) Osorno, Chile
- Party: Democratic Revolution
- Education: University of Valparaíso
- Profession: Teacher

María José Oyarzún Solís (born 23 October 1982) is a Chilean philosophy teacher, feminist activist, and politician of the Democratic Revolution party.

She served as a member of the Constitutional Convention, representing the 7th electoral district of the Valparaíso Region.

== Biography ==
Oyarzún was born on 23 October 1982 in Osorno. She is the daughter of Héctor Oyarzún Triviño and Claudina Solís Ibáñez.

She completed her secondary education in 2000 at Colegio Diocesano Obispo Labbé in Iquique. She pursued higher education at the University of Valparaíso (UV), where she earned a degree in philosophy and qualified as a secondary education teacher in philosophy. Her undergraduate thesis was titled La figuración de lo otro femenino.

Professionally, she has worked as a university lecturer in feminism and sexual diversity. She was the manager of the first Feminist Library and a founding member of the Interdisciplinary Gender Network at the UV. In the community sphere, she has participated in women’s circles.

== Political career ==
Oyarzún was a member of the defunct Democratic Revolution (RD) party and was one of its founders in Valparaíso. She also served on the national leadership of the Movimiento Marca AC and acted as spokesperson and coordinator of the “Bancada por la Asamblea Constituyente”.

In the elections held on 15–16 May 2021, she ran as a candidate for the Constitutional Convention for the 7th electoral district of the Valparaíso Region, representing RD within the Apruebo Dignidad electoral pact. She received 2,613 votes, corresponding to 0.79% of the validly cast votes, and entered the Convention through the gender parity correction mechanism.

In October 2022, she assumed the position of chief of staff to the Regional Secretary of Health (SEREMI) of the Valparaíso Region, Lorena Cofré.
