= Pollyana Rivera =

Chilean constituent (born 1974)

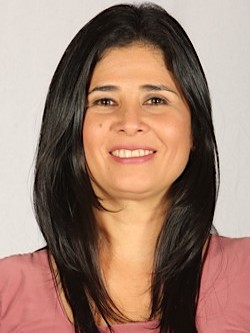

Member of the Constitutional Convention
- In office 4 July 2021 – 4 July 2022
- Constituency: 1st District

Personal details
- Born: 26 November 1974 (age 51) Arica, Chile
- Parent(s): Jesús Rivera; Linda Bigas
- Education: University of Chile; Central University of Venezuela
- Occupation: Politician
- Profession: Journalist

Pollyana Rivera Bigas (born 26 December 1974) is a Chilean communications professional and former candidate for the Chilean Constitutional Convention.

== Biography ==
Rivera was born on 26 December 1974 in Santiago, Chile. She is the daughter of Jesús Ángel Rivera Rojas and Linda Estrella del Pilar Bigas Zanetta.

She is single and has one daughter.

== Education and career ==
Rivera completed her secondary education at Liceo Tajamar in the commune of Providencia, graduating in 1992. She studied journalism at the University of Chile and social communication at the Central University of Venezuela.

She has extensive experience in communications, press, television, film, and public relations. Rivera has worked with communities in both public and private sectors, serving as head of communications at the Regional Ministry (SEREMI) of National Assets of the Arica and Parinacota Region and at the Municipal Education Directorate (DAEM).

She also worked as a journalist and public relations officer for the local water utility company. In addition, Rivera was a producer at the regional television channel Arica TV and was a morning show host for six years.

== Political career ==
Rivera is an independent politician.

In the elections held on 15–16 May 2021, she ran as a candidate for the Constitutional Convention representing the 1st District of the Arica and Parinacota Region as an independent on a seat supported by the Independent Democratic Union and as part of the Vamos por Chile coalition. She obtained 3,469 votes, corresponding to 6.06% of the valid votes cast.

She served on the Commission on Form of State, Order, Autonomy, Decentralization, Equity, Justice Territorial, Local Governments, and Fiscal Organization of the Constitutional Convention.
