= Christian Viera =

Chilean scholar

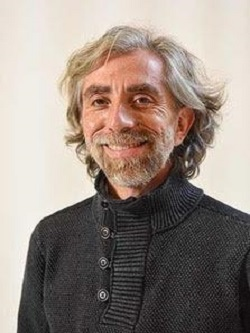

Member of the Constitutional Convention
- In office 4 July 2021 – 4 July 2022
- Constituency: 17th District

Personal details
- Born: 31 July 1972 (age 54) Curicó, Chile
- Education: Pontifical Catholic University of Valparaíso (LL.B); Alberto Hurtado University (LL.M); University of Deusto (PhD)
- Profession: Lawyer

Christian Viera Álvarez (born 31 July 1972) is a Chilean lawyer, Doctor of Law, and independent politician.

He served as a member of the Constitutional Convention, representing the 17th electoral district of the Maule Region, and acted as coordinator of the Committee on the Justice System, Autonomous Oversight Bodies, and Constitutional Reform.

== Biography ==
Viera was born on 31 July 1972 in Curicó. He is the son of Sergio Viera and Ana María Álvarez. He is married to Lorena Zuchel, with whom he has two children, Francisco and Martín.

=== Professional career ===
He completed his primary and secondary education at Escuela E-21, Liceo de Hombres, and Instituto San Martín in Curicó. He studied law at the Pontifical Catholic University of Valparaíso (PUCV), qualifying as a lawyer. He later obtained a Master’s degree in Philosophical Studies from Alberto Hurtado University (UAH). Between 2008 and 2011, he lived in the Basque Country, Spain, where he earned a PhD in Law from the University of Deusto.

He is currently a full professor at the School of Law of the University of Valparaíso. He has published numerous academic articles and several books, including Libre iniciativa económica y Estado social (2013), and, co-authored with Jaime Bassa, Elementos de teoría e interpretación constitucional para el Proceso Constituyente (2017) and Derechos, pero así no (2018). He is also a co-editor of La Constitución chilena (2015) and La Constitución que queremos (2019).

=== Political career ===
In the elections held on 15–16 May 2021, he ran as an independent candidate for the Constitutional Convention representing the 17th electoral district of the Maule Region as part of the Lista del Apruebo electoral pact, on a Christian Democratic Party (PDC) slot, receiving 9,164 votes (4.02% of the validly cast votes).
