= Roberto Vega Campusano =

Chilean lawyer (born 1978)

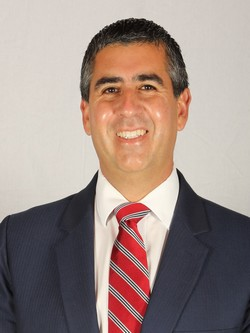
- Campusano in 2022

Member of the Constitutional Convention
- In office 4 July 2021 – 4 July 2022
- Constituency: 5th District

Personal details
- Born: 1 February 1978 (age 48) La Serena, Chile
- Party: Renovación Nacional
- Education: Pontifical Catholic University of Valparaíso (LL.B)
- Occupation: Politician
- Profession: Lawyer

Roberto Vega Campusano (born 1 February 1978) is a Chilean lawyer and politician. A member of National Renewal, he was elected as a member of the Constitutional Convention in 2021, representing the 5th District of the Coquimbo Region.

He previously served as Regional Ministerial Secretary of Mining for the Coquimbo Region between 2018 and 2020 during the second administration of President Sebastián Piñera.

== Early life and family ==
Vega was born on 1 February 1978 in La Serena, Chile. He is the son of Roberto Vega Alcayaga and Érika Campusano Murillo.

He is married to Catalina Mulet Díaz, a legal adviser to the Provincial Government of Elqui, and has one daughter.

== Professional career ==
Vega completed his primary and secondary education at Colegio Amalia Errázuriz in the commune of Ovalle, graduating in 1996. He studied law at the University of Valparaíso and the University of the Sea. He was sworn in as a lawyer before the Supreme Court of Chile on 3 September 2009.

He later completed a Master’s degree in Law, with a specialization in business law, at the Pontifical Catholic University of Valparaíso.

Vega has practiced law in both the public and private sectors. Since 2011, he has been part of the consultancy firm Agroley, where he has served as general manager. He has also worked as a professor at the Central University of Chile and taught accounting at Santo Tomás University.

He has participated in the Supervisory Board of the Limarí River and in the Agricultural Society of the North.

== Political career ==
He served as a legislative adviser to former senator Baldo Prokurica. Between 2018 and 2020, he held the position of Regional Ministerial Secretary of Mining for the Coquimbo Region during the second government of President Sebastián Piñera.

In the 2017 parliamentary elections, he ran as a candidate for the Chamber of Deputies of Chile representing the 5th District of the Coquimbo Region on behalf of National Renewal, obtaining 6,372 votes (2.75%) but was not elected.

In the elections held on 15–16 May 2021, Vega ran as a candidate for the Constitutional Convention representing the 5th District of the Coquimbo Region as a member of National Renewal, within the Vamos por Chile electoral pact. He obtained 7,990 votes, corresponding to 3.55% of the valid votes cast, and was elected as a member of the Convention.
