= Luis Barceló Amado =

Chilean politician

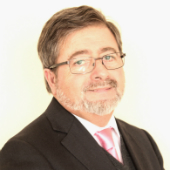

Member of the Constitutional Convention
- In office 4 July 2021 – 4 July 2022
- Constituency: 21st District

Provincial Governor of Bío Bío Region
- In office 11 March 2014 – 11 March 2018
- Preceded by: María Carolina Ríos
- Succeeded by: María Teresa Browne

Personal details
- Born: 10 November 1953 (age 72) Santiago, Chile
- Party: Socialist Party (1983–1988); Party for Democracy (1988–2018)
- Other political affiliations: Revolutionary Left Movement (1972–1980)
- Education: University of Chile (LL.B)
- Occupation: Politician
- Profession: Lawyer

Luis Barceló Amado (born 10 November 1953) is a Chilean lawyer and independent politician.

He served as a member of the Constitutional Convention, representing the 21st District of the Biobío Region. He previously served as Governor of the Province of Biobío between 2014 and 2018.

== Biography ==
Barceló was born on 10 November 1953 in Traiguén, Araucanía Region. He is the son of Luis Enrique Barceló Olave and Ciria Amado Caba. At the age of ten, he moved to the commune of Mulchén and later settled in the city of Los Ángeles, Biobío Region.

He completed his primary and secondary education at Colegio Bautista de Temuco, a public school in Mulchén, and the Liceo Alemán de Los Ángeles. From 1969 to 1970, he was part of the Chilean Navy. He later completed his secondary education at the Liceo de Hombres de Los Ángeles.

In 1972, he entered the Faculty of Law at the University of Chile, where he obtained a degree in Legal and Social Sciences. He was admitted to the Chilean bar by the Supreme Court of Justice on 14 November 1983.

Barceló has practiced law independently and served as a professor of Civil Law at the Los Ángeles campus of Bolivarian University at Chile. He also worked as a lawyer for the National Institute for Agricultural Development (INDAP).

== Political career ==
During the early 1970s, Barceló Amado was a member of the Revolutionary Left Movement (MIR).

During the 1980s, he participated in opposition mobilizations against the military regime of Augusto Pinochet and was affiliated with the Socialist Party (PS) and later the Party for Democracy (PPD). He subsequently became an independent politician.

From 2014 to 2018, he served as Governor of the Biobío Province during the second administration of President Michelle Bachelet.

In the elections held on 15 and 16 May 2021, he ran as an independent candidate for the Constitutional Convention representing the 21st District of the Biobío Region, on the Lista del Apruebo electoral pact, in a seat allocated to the PPD. He obtained 7,576 votes, corresponding to 4.5% of the valid votes cast, and was elected as a constitutional delegate.
