= Ingrid Villena =

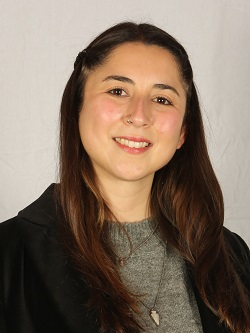

Member of the Constitutional Convention
- In office 4 July 2021 – 4 July 2022
- Constituency: 13th District

Personal details
- Born: 5 June 1990 (age 36) Santiago, Chile
- Education: Central University of Chile (LL.B)
- Occupation: Constituent
- Profession: Lawyer

Ingrid Villena Narbona (born 5 June 1990) is a Chilean lawyer and independent politician.

She served as a member of the Constitutional Convention, representing the 13th electoral district of the Santiago Metropolitan Region.

== Biography ==
Villena was born on 5 June 1990 in Santiago. She is the daughter of Rolando Alfredo Villena Bustos and Ingrid Belinda Narbona Esguep.

=== Professional career ===
She completed her primary and secondary education at Escuela Particular Liahona in the commune of El Bosque. After finishing secondary education in 2007, she pursued higher education at the Central University of Chile, graduating in law in 2012 and subsequently qualifying as a lawyer.

She holds a postgraduate diploma in Child Sexual Abuse (CSA), completed at Fundación para la Confianza.

She has practiced law independently, focusing on family law, particularly the legal defense of women who are victims of domestic violence, and the defense of children and adolescents whose rights have been violated.

=== Public career ===
Villena is an independent politician and an activist against child sexual abuse.

In the elections held on 15–16 May 2021, she ran as an independent candidate for the Constitutional Convention representing the 13th electoral district of the Metropolitan Region as part of the La Lista del Pueblo electoral pact, receiving 19,847 votes (8.61% of the validly cast votes).
