= Lisette Vergara =

Chilean politician

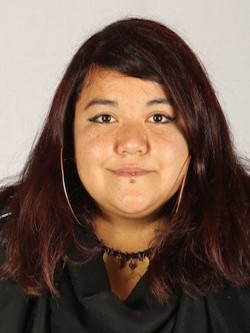

Member of the Constitutional Convention
- In office 4 July 2021 – 4 July 2022
- Constituency: 6th District

Personal details
- Born: 14 September 1992 (age 34) Quilpué, Chile
- Other political affiliations: The List of the People (2021–2022)
- Education: University of Playa Ancha
- Occupation: Politician
- Profession: Teacher

Lisette Vergara Riquelme (born 14 September 1992) is a Chilean history and geography teacher and independent politician.

She served as a member of the Constitutional Convention, representing the 6th electoral district of the Valparaíso Region, and acted as coordinator of the Committee on Popular Participation and Territorial Equity.

== Biography ==
Vergara Riquelme was born on 14 September 1992 in Melipilla. She is the daughter of Carlos Vergara Cisterna and Gladys Riquelme Ortiz.

She completed her primary education at Colegio Villa Logroño in Melipilla and her secondary education at Colegio Particular San Sebastián de Melipilla, graduating in 2010.

She studied History and Geography Education at the University of Playa Ancha of Educational Sciences (UPLA), qualifying as a History and Geography teacher.

=== Political career ===
In the elections held on 15–16 May 2021, she ran as an independent candidate for the Constitutional Convention representing the 6th electoral district of the Valparaíso Region as part of the La Lista del Pueblo electoral pact, receiving 11,354 votes (3.46% of the validly cast votes).
