= Alejandra Flores Carlos =

Chilean constituent

Alejandra Flores
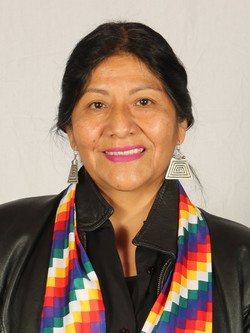

Member of the Constitutional Convention
- In office 4 July 2021 – 4 July 2022
- Constituency: 1st District

Personal details
- Born: 1961 (age 64–65) Pica, Chile
- Party: None
- Education: University of Tarapacá (BA)
- Occupation: Constituent
- Profession: Teacher of Spanish

Alejandra Alicia Flores Carlos (born 10 March 1961, Pica, Chile) is a Chilean Spanish-language teacher and independent politician of Aymara origin.

She served as a member of the Constitutional Convention of Chile, representing the District 2 of the Tarapacá Region.

== Biography ==
Flores Carlos was born on 10 March 1961 in Pica, Tarapacá Region. She belongs to the Aymara people and is the daughter of Agustín Flores Apala and Petronila Alicia Carlos.

=== Education and professional career ===
She completed her secondary education at the Liceo de Niñas Elena Duvauchelle in Iquique. She obtained a degree as a Spanish-language teacher from the University of Tarapacá. She holds a master’s degree in Social Sciences with a specialization in ethnic studies from FLACSO Ecuador, and has postgraduate diplomas in Intercultural Health and in Planning and Management for Indigenous Development.

Since 2007, she has served as Regional Coordinator for Health and Indigenous Peoples at the Ministry of Health in the Tarapacá Region. She has also worked as a project supervisor at the National Corporation for Indigenous Development (CONADI) and as head of Intercultural Education, Culture and Health for the Orígenes Program, implemented by MIDEPLAN and the Inter-American Development Bank.

== Political and public career ==
Flores Carlos is an independent politician and a member of the National Association of Rural and Indigenous Women (ANAMURI). She has been active as a social leader for approximately thirty years, with participation in student movements and health workers’ organizations.

In the elections held on 15 and 16 May 2021, she ran as an independent candidate for the Constitutional Convention representing District 2 of the Tarapacá Region, as part of the “Independientes de Tarapacá” electoral pact. She received 3,758 votes, corresponding to 4.78% of the validly cast votes.

During the Convention’s regulatory phase, she served on the Commission on Popular Participation and Territorial Equity. She later joined the Thematic Commission on Political System, Legislative Power and Electoral System, as well as the Commission on Indigenous Peoples’ Rights and Plurinationality.
