= Luciano Silva Mora =

Chilean constituent

Luciano Silva
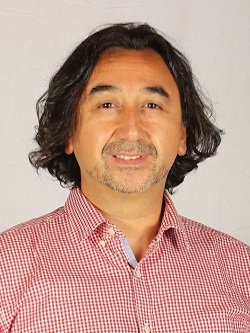

Member of the Constitutional Convention
- In office 4 July 2021 – 4 July 2022
- Constituency: 20th District

Personal details
- Born: 3 February 1971 (age 55) Talca, Chile
- Party: Partido Social Cristiano
- Spouse: Liliana Pincheira
- Education: University of Playa Ancha (BA); University for Development (MA); Catholic University of the Maule (PhD)
- Occupation: Politician
- Profession: School teacher

Luciano Silva Mora (born 3 February 1971) is a Chilean primary school teacher, theologian, evangelical pastor, and politician.

A member of National Renewal, he was elected as a member of the Constitutional Convention in 2021, representing the 20th District of the Biobío Region.

== Early life and family ==
Silva was born on 3 February 1971 in Tomé, Chile. He is the son of Luis Silva Baza and Uberlinda Mora Urrutia. He is married to Liliana Pincheira Reyes, a religious education teacher.

== Professional career ==
Silva completed his primary education at Escuela Gabriela Mistral of Tomé and his secondary education at Liceo Vicente Palacios Valdés in the same city. He studied at the University of Playa Ancha, where he qualified as a primary school teacher in 1998.

As of June 2021, he was completing a master's degree in public policy with a specialization in educational management and policy at the Universidad del Desarrollo (2019–2021), and doctoral studies in education and culture at the Universidad Católica del Maule.

He has also undertaken theological studies at the Pentecostal Bible Institute and the Ministerial Advancement Institute of the Assemblies of God, qualifying as an evangelical pastor.

Professionally, Silva served as director of the Paidagogos Pre-university Institute between 2000 and 2018. Since 2018, he has worked as an adviser to the National Office for Religious Affairs (ONAR) within the Ministry General Secretariat of the Presidency. He has also lectured on topics related to religion, politics, cultural anthropology, and Christian thought.

== Political career ==
Silva is the founder and pastor of the Evangelical Covenant Church of Chile in Tomé, established in 2008, and has served as a representative of the city’s council of pastors.

In the 2008 municipal elections, he ran unsuccessfully for mayor of Tomé as an independent candidate within the Juntos Podemos Más pact, obtaining 3,187 votes (12.10%). He made a second unsuccessful mayoral bid in 2012, and in 2016 ran unsuccessfully for the municipal council as an independent candidate within the Yo Marco por el Cambio pact.

In the elections held on 15–16 May 2021, Silva ran as a candidate for the Constitutional Convention representing the 20th District of the Biobío Region as a member of National Renewal within the Vamos por Chile electoral list. He obtained 9,281 votes, corresponding to 3.04% of the valid votes cast, and was elected as a member of the Convention.

On 5 January 2022, he played a decisive role in the election of the President of the Constitutional Convention by contributing his vote to secure the required majority.
