= Carlos Calvo Muñoz =

Chilean constituent

Carlos Calvo
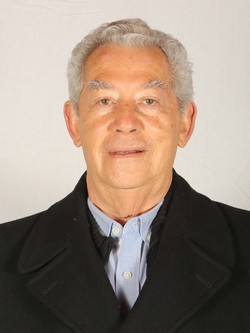

Member of the Constitutional Convention
- In office 4 July 2021 – 4 July 2022
- Constituency: 4th District

Personal details
- Born: 7 March 1946 (age 80) Valparaíso, Chile
- Education: Pontifical Catholic University of Valparaíso (BA); Stanford University (MA, PhD)
- Occupation: Constituent
- Profession: Philosophy teacher

Carlos Calvo Muñoz (born 7 March 1946) is a Chilean philosopher of education, academic, and independent politician.

He served as a member of the Constitutional Convention between 2021 and 2022, representing the 5th District of the Coquimbo Region.

== Biography ==
Calvo was born on 7 March 1946 in Valparaíso, Chile. He is the son of Carlos Calvo Collarte and Blanca Muñoz Lara. He is married to Pricila Leni Olivares and is the father of three children.

He obtained a licentiate degree and teaching qualification in philosophy from the Pontifical Catholic University of Valparaíso.

He earned a Doctorate in Education from Stanford University, United States, as well as a Master of Arts in Anthropology and a Master of Arts in Education from the same institution. He also completed postdoctoral research at Stanford University and at the University of Leuven, Belgium.

== Academic career ==
Calvo worked as a professor and researcher at the University of La Serena, teaching philosophy, sociology, and anthropology. He has been a visiting professor and lecturer at universities in Latin America, the United States, Europe, India, and China. He has also taught at the Open University of the Municipality of Recoleta, Chile.

Since 2008, he has been part of the FONDECYT Study Group on Education. He served as director of the Doctorate in Education program with a specialization in Pedagogical Mediation and coordinated the Teacher Exchange Program (PRIMA), an educational self-management initiative promoting international study residencies for teachers and students at the University of La Serena.

His research focuses on education, chaos theory, complexity, and ethnoeducation. He is the author of Del mapa escolar al territorio educativo (2008).

== Political and public activity ==
Influenced by Brazilian the educator and philosopher Paulo Freire, with whom he studied, Calvo participated in literacy campaigns for urban and rural communities in Chile and other parts of Latin America.

In the elections held on 15–16 May 2021, he ran as an independent candidate for the Constitutional Convention representing the 5th District of the Coquimbo Region, with the support of the Socialist Party (PS), within the Apruebo electoral list. He was elected with 12,514 votes, corresponding to 5.55% of the valid votes cast.
