= Eric Chinga =

Chilean constituent

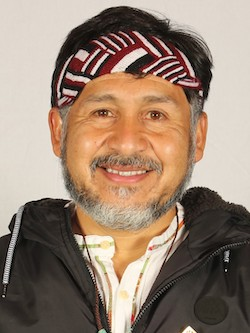

Member of the Constitutional Convention
- In office 4 July 2021 – 4 July 2022
- Constituency: Reserved seat

Personal details
- Born: 31 July 1970 (age 55) Copiapó, Chile
- Party: Independent
- Occupation: Constituent

Eric Johanny Chinga Ferreira (born 31 July 1970, Copiapó, Chile) is a Chilean trade union leader and politician. He served as a member of the Constitutional Convention of Chile through the reserved seats for Indigenous peoples, representing the Diaguita people.

== Early life ==
Chinga Ferreira was born on 31 July 1970 in Copiapó. He is the son of José Jilberto Chinga and Ana del Carmen Ferreira. He is married to Rosa Álvarez Bonilla.

He completed his secondary education at Liceo A No. 4 José Antonio Carvajal in Copiapó, graduating in 1988. He has worked in the hotel and gastronomy sector in the Atacama Region.

== Political career ==
He was active as a secondary student leader and later became a trade unionist affiliated with the Central Unitaria de Trabajadores de Chile (CUT).

He has been a member of the National Diaguita Network in the Atacama Region. Since 2012, he has served as president of the Diaguita Community of the Province of Copiapó. He has participated in consultations on a new Indigenous institutional framework promoted during the administration of President Michelle Bachelet, as well as in consultations conducted by the Ministry of Cultures, Arts and Heritage. He also took part in discussions in the Chilean Senate regarding the law on reserved Indigenous seats and in the process leading to the recognition of the Diaguita people by the Chilean state under Law No. 19,253.

== Constitutional Convention ==
In the elections held on 15 and 16 May 2021, Chinga Ferreira ran as a candidate for the reserved Indigenous seats representing the Diaguita people (covering the regions of Atacama and Coquimbo). He obtained 3,663 votes, corresponding to 32.59% of the valid votes cast, and entered the Convention through the gender parity mechanism, replacing María Calderón Álvarez.

He advocated for a plurinational constitution and state, promoting the concept of Buen Vivir (good living) for all peoples. His proposals included recognizing Pachamama as a subject of rights, establishing water as a fundamental right linked to food sovereignty, restoring the productive capacity of land, and protecting native seeds. He also argued that political decisions should be made by all peoples based on the realities of each territory, within a decentralized framework that respects both human and Indigenous rights and territorial autonomies.

During the Convention’s regulatory phase, he served on the Commission on Popular Participation and Territorial Equity, as well as on the Commission on Indigenous Participation and Consultation. He later joined the Thematic Commission on Form of the State, Territorial Organization, Autonomy, Decentralization, Equity, Territorial Justice, Local Governments and Fiscal Organization, and the Commission on Indigenous Peoples’ Rights and Plurinationality. He also served on the Popular Participation Commission representing the reserved Indigenous seats.

In the election to renew the Convention’s governing board held on 4 and 5 January 2022, Chinga Ferreira was a candidate for the presidency of the Convention, but was not elected.
