= Ruggero Cozzi =

Chilean politician (born 1986)

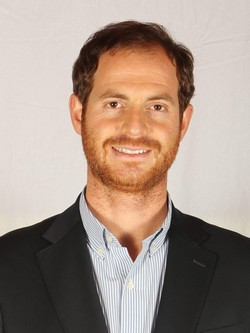

Member of the Constitutional Convention
- In office 4 July 2021 – 4 July 2022
- Constituency: 6th District

Personal details
- Born: 9 December 1986 (age 39) Valparaíso, Chile
- Party: National Renewal
- Spouse: Sofía Brahm Justiniano
- Parent(s): Ruggero Cozzi Paredes; Marcela Elzo
- Education: Pontifical Catholic University of Chile (LL.B); University of Turin (M.L.)
- Profession: Lawyer

Ruggero Ignacio Cozzi Elzo (born 9 December 1986) is a Chilean lawyer and politician.

Cozzi was a member of the Chilean Constitutional Convention during 2021–2022. His participation was marked by a firm stance in favor of institutional stability and the rule of law, often positioning himself against the more radical elements of the Convention.

Similarly, he has been professor of Public International Law and Human Rights at the University of the Andes, Chile, as well as a professor of International Law at the Pontifical Catholic University of Chile and a partner in a law firm.

A member of the center-right political spectrum, he has also contributed to public policy through his role in the think tank affiliated with his party, the Instituto Libertad.

== Biography ==
Ruggero Cozzi was born in Valparaíso in 1986. He is the son of Ruggero Cozzi Paredes, a retired officer of the Chilean Navy. His brother, Francisco, is also an officer in the Chilean Navy. He attended Capellán Pascal School and Arturo Prat Chacón School in Talcahuano, graduating in 2004.

Cozzi joined Pontifical Catholic University of Chile (PUC) School of Law, where he graduated in early 2010s. In the PUC, he was a founding member of the student movement Solidaridad (lit. Solidarity), based in the figure of Lech Wałęsa. At the time, he expressed a socially conservative and pro-life stance, opposing the legalization of abortion in Chile. He was sworn in as a lawyer before the Supreme Court of Justice on April 24, 2013. Then he completed a Master of Laws, University of Turin in Italy.

From 2014 to 2015, he served as executive director of the NGO Comunidad y Justicia. Starting in 2017, he worked with the law firm Baker McKenzie. Years later, he decided to leave the private sector to dedicate himself to public affairs, which materialized in his campaign to be elected to the Constitutional Convention during the country’s first, ultimately unsuccessful, attempt to draft a new constitution.

On 4 July he was elected as constituent. At the first session of the Constitutional Convention, a group of protesters assaulted Cozzi after he expressed opposition to granting pardons to individuals imprisoned for crimes committed during the social unrest.

In 2022, Cozzi was an active participant in the campaign for the winning «Reject» option against the proposed new constitution drafted by the Constitutional Convention, which was dominated by the political left. Nevertheless, his political sector supported a second constitutional process (2023), which was also rejected.
