= Elisa Giustinianovich =

Chilean politician (born 1984)

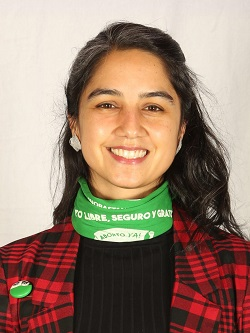

Member of the Constitutional Convention
- In office 4 July 2021 – 4 July 2022
- Constituency: 28th District

Personal details
- Born: 23 November 1984 (age 41) Concepción, Chile
- Other political affiliations: The List of the People (2021–2022)
- Education: University of Concepción (BA, MA and PhD)
- Occupation: Politician

Elisa Giustinianovich Campos (born 23 November 1984) is a Chilean chemical engineer, bioengineer, academic, and independent politician.

She served as a member of the Constitutional Convention from 2021 to 2022, representing the 28th District of the Magallanes and Chilean Antarctica Region.

She also served as Vice President Adjunct of the Convention from 29 July 2021 to 6 January 2022 and coordinated the Commission on Transitional Provisions.

== Biography ==
Giustinianovich was born on 23 November 1984 in Concepción, Chile. She is the daughter of Pablo Yerko Giustinianovich Pérez and Nelvia Viviana Campos Bahamondes.

She completed her secondary education at Enseñanza Media H-C Niños y Jóvenes. She pursued higher education at the University of Concepción (UdeC), where she studied Bioengineering between 2004 and 2008.

From 2009 to 2010, she completed a Master of Engineering Sciences with a specialization in Chemical engineering, and between 2013 and 2017 she earned a PhD in Chemical Engineering, also at the UdeC.

Professionally, Giustinianovich has worked as a researcher at the Department of Chemical Engineering of the University of Concepción. Since 2018, she has served as a researcher at the Center for Energy Resources Studies of the University of Magallanes.

== Political career ==
Giustinianovich is an independent politician and a member of the Coordinadora Social Magallanes. Between 2012 and 2016, she collaborated with the popular education project Los Copihues. Since 2018, she has participated in the Coordinadora Feminista Punta Arenas and in the collective Rosas Silvestres, which brings together organizations and women activists to denounce and demand justice against gender-based violence. Since 2020, she has been a member of the Red Austral de Acción Territorial.

In the elections held on 15–16 May 2021, Giustinianovich ran as an independent candidate for the Constitutional Convention representing the 28th District of the Magallanes and Chilean Antarctica Region, as part of the Coordinadora Social de Magallanes pact. She was elected with 4,259 votes, corresponding to 7.82% of the valid votes cast.

On 29 July 2021, in accordance with the Convention’s regulations, she was ratified as Vice President Adjunct of the Convention’s Steering Committee, a position she held until 6 January 2022. During her tenure, she coordinated the Commission on Transitional Provisions.
