= Valentina Miranda =

Chilean political activist (born 2000)

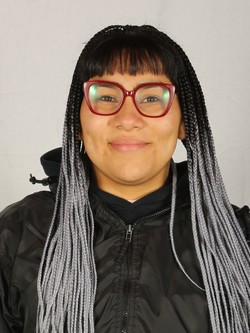
- Valentina Miranda,2021

Member of the Constitutional Convention
- In office 4 July 2021 – 4 July 2022
- Constituency: 8th District

Personal details
- Born: 19 March 2000 (age 26) Lo Espejo, Santiago, Chile
- Party: Communist Party
- Occupation: Political activist

Valentina Miranda Arce (born 19 March 2000) is a Chilean student, feminist activist, and politician.

A member of the Communist Party of Chile, she was elected as a member of the Constitutional Convention in 2021, representing the 8th District of the Metropolitan Region of Santiago.

== Early life and family ==
Miranda was born in Santiago on 19 March 2000. She is the daughter of Aldo Miranda Cortés and Pamela Arce Rojas.

Miranda completed her primary education at Grace School in the commune of Pedro Aguirre Cerda and at Liceo Javiera Carrera in Santiago. She continued her secondary education at the same institution and later at Liceo Bicentenario Teresa Prats of Santiago, graduating in 2019.

She enrolled in the Public Administration program at the University of Chile. At the time of the Constitutional Convention, she was a university student.

== Political career ==
Miranda began her career in the Communist Party of Chile. In 2019, she served as national spokesperson for the National Coordinator of Secondary Students (CONES), a prominent Chilean secondary school student organization.

In the elections held on 15–16 May 2021, Miranda ran as a candidate for the Constitutional Convention representing the 8th District of the Metropolitan Region, as part of the Apruebo Dignidad list for the Communist Party of Chile. She obtained 10,931 votes, corresponding to 2.42% of the valid votes cast, and was elected as a member of the Convention.
