= Cristóbal Andrade =

Chilean politician

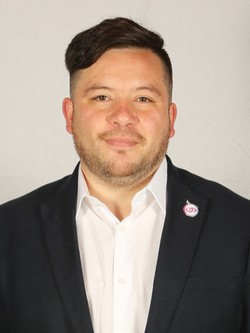

Member of the Constitutional Convention
- In office 4 July 2021 – 4 July 2022
- Constituency: 6th District

Personal details
- Born: 30 September 1988 (age 37) Santiago, Chile
- Other party: The List of the People (2021–2022)
- Occupation: Political activist

Cristóbal Andrade León (born 30 September 1988) is a Chilean automotive mechanic and independent politician.

Andrade is noted for his trademark blue Tyrannosaurus rex costume, which he wears to sessions of the Constitutional Convention. Andrade wears the costume in order to showcase his independence from traditional Chilean politicians.

He served as a member of the Constitutional Convention of Chile, representing the 6th District of the Valparaíso Region.

== Biography ==
Andrade was born on 30 September 1988 in Santiago, Chile. He is the son of Pedro Andrade Tapia and María León Ormazábal.

He completed his primary education at Escuela Básica Fernando Durán Villareal in Quilpué and his secondary education at the Escuela Superior Industrial de Valparaíso, graduating in 2006. He later studied automotive mechanics at DUOC-UC Professional Institute, Valparaíso campus.

He has worked professionally as an automotive mechanic.

== Political career ==
In 2006, Andrade participated in the Chilean student movement. Since 2018, he has been involved in the social organization Cordón Solidario Quilpué, working alongside Somos el Pueblo Quilpué. He is also publicly known for his character "Dino Azulado".

In the elections held on 15 and 16 May 2021, he ran as an independent candidate for the Constitutional Convention representing the 6th District of the Valparaíso Region, as part of La Lista del Pueblo. He obtained 6,767 votes, corresponding to 2.06% of the valid votes cast, and entered the Convention through the gender parity correction mechanism.

On 12 April 2022, through a public statement, he announced the end of his affiliation with La Lista del Pueblo, remaining as an independent constitutional convention member for District 6.
