= Felipe Mena Villar =

Chilean constituent

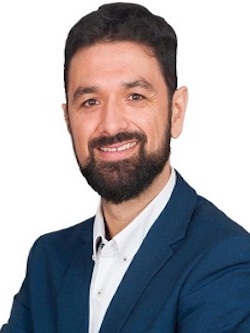

Member of the Constitutional Convention
- In office 4 July 2021 – 4 July 2022
- Constituency: 24th District

Regional Director of the National Sports Institute
- In office 19 February 2020 – 2021
- Preceded by: Vacant
- Succeeded by: Tamara Calfil

Personal details
- Born: 18 August 1982 (age 44) Chile
- Party: Independent Democratic Union
- Education: Austral University of Chile (BA)
- Occupation: Constituent
- Profession: Agronomist

Felipe Mena Villar (born 18 August 1982) is a Chilean agronomical engineer and politician.

A member of the Independent Democratic Union (UDI), he was elected as a member of the Constitutional Convention in 2021, representing the 24th District of the Los Ríos Region.

From 2020 to 2021, he served as Regional Director of the «Instituto Nacional de Deportes» (National Institute of Sports).

== Biography ==
Mena was born on 18 August 1982 in Chile. He is the son of Carlos Mauricio Mena Nannig and Alicia del Carmen Villar Vargas. He is married to Daniela Fuchslocher.

Mena completed his secondary education at the German Institute of Osorno. He qualified as an agronomical engineer at the Austral University of Chile. He later obtained a Master of Business Administration degree from the Universidad del Desarrollo.

From 2007 to 2010, he worked in the private sector.

== Political career ==
Mena has held several public sector positions, including Regional Director of the National Youth Institute (INE) from 2010 to 2012, Regional Director of the Solidarity and Social Investment Fund between 2012 and 2013, and Regional Director of the National Sports Institute.

He has also been elected twice as a regional councillor for the Los Ríos Region.

In the elections held on 15–16 May 2021, Mena ran as a candidate for the Constitutional Convention representing the 24th District of the Los Ríos Region as part of the Vamos por Chile electoral pact. He obtained 6,201 votes, corresponding to 5.4% of the valid votes cast, and was elected as a member of the Convention.
