= Aurora Delgado =

Chilean politician

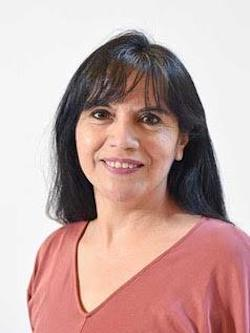

Member of the Constitutional Convention
- In office 4 July 2021 – 4 July 2022
- Constituency: 24th District

Personal details
- Born: 31 July 1964 (age 62) Valdivia, Chile
- Party: Democratic Revolution
- Education: Austral University of Chile (BA)

Aurora Delgado Vergara (born 31 July 1964 in Valdivia) is a Chilean midwife and independent politician.

She served as a member of the Constitutional Convention, representing the 24th electoral district of the Los Ríos Region.

== Biography ==
Delgado Vergara was born on 31 July 1964. She is the daughter of Sergio Delgado Pacheco and Genoveva Vergara Mella.

She studied Obstetrics and Childcare at the Austral University, qualifying as a midwife in 1985.

She has worked for approximately thirty years in the Los Ríos Region as a public healthcare midwife. She initially worked at the Primary Healthcare Clinic of Lago Ranco, later at the hospitals of Los Lagos and Lanco, and since 1994 at the Valdivia Base Hospital (HBV).

== Political and public career ==
Delgado Vergara is an independent politician, then politically close to the Democratic Revolution (RD) (2016–2024) party. In 1998, she was a founding member of the National Federation of University Professionals of the Health Services (Fenpruss) at Valdivia Base Hospital. Between 2000 and 2004, she served as a national leader of the organization.

From 2008 to 2011, she was president of Fenpruss HBV and spokesperson for the Public Sector Board of the Los Ríos Region. Since 2015, she has served as president of Fenpruss HBV and coordinator of Fenpruss in the Los Ríos Region.

In the elections held on 15–16 May 2021, she ran as an independent candidate for the 24th electoral district of the Los Ríos Region, on a RD slot within the Apruebo Dignidad electoral pact. She received 4,831 votes, corresponding to 4.2% of the validly cast votes.
