= Maximiliano Hurtado =

Chilean politician

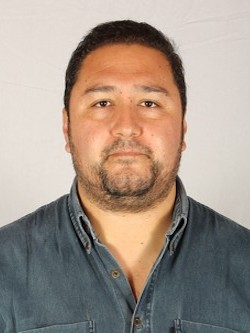

Member of the Constitutional Convention
- In office 4 July 2021 – 4 July 2022
- Constituency: 4th District

Personal details
- Born: 27 September 1984 (age 42) Chile
- Party: Socialist Party
- Parent(s): Hernán Hurtado; Sylvia Roco
- Education: University of Atacama (LL.B)
- Occupation: Lawyer

Maximiliano Hurtado Roco (born 27 September 1984, Copiapó, Chile) is a Chilean politician and member of the Socialist Party of Chile.

He served as a member of the Constitutional Convention of Chile, representing District 4 of the Atacama Region.

== Biography ==
Hurtado Roco was born on 27 September 1984 in Copiapó, Atacama Region. He is the son of Hernán Walterio Hurtado Palleros and Sylvia Teresa Roco Rodríguez.

=== Education and professional career ===
He completed his secondary education at the Escuela Técnico Profesional de Copiapó, graduating in 2002. He later pursued studies in law at the University of Atacama.

In his professional career, he worked as a legislative adviser to Senator Isabel Allende Bussi.

== Political career ==
Hurtado Roco is a member of the Socialist Party of Chile.

In the elections held on 15 and 16 May 2021, he ran as a Socialist Party candidate for the Constitutional Convention representing District 4 of the Atacama Region, as part of the “Apruebo” electoral pact. He received 3,084 votes, corresponding to 3.75% of the valid votes cast.

In 2023, he played an active role in the campaign of former senator Ricardo Núñez Muñoz as a candidate for the Constitutional Council representing the Atacama Region.

During the Convention’s regulatory phase, he served on the Provisional Ethics Commission. He later joined the Thematic Commission on Political System, Legislative Power, and Electoral System.
