= Ricardo Neumann =

Chilean politician (born 1987)

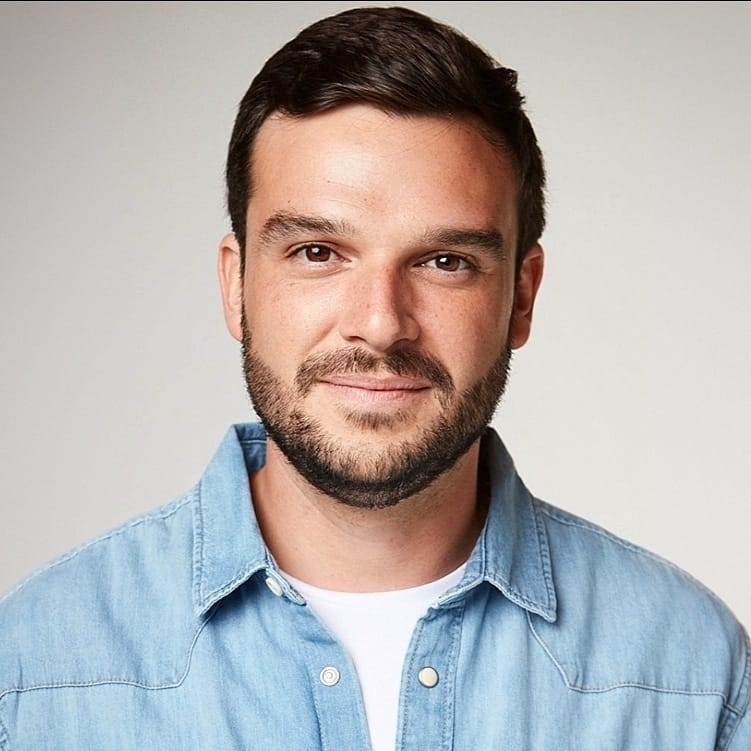

Member of the Chamber of Deputies
- Incumbent
- Assumed office 11 March 2026
- Constituency: 16th District

Member of the Constitutional Convention
- In office 4 July 2021 – 4 July 2022
- Constituency: 16th District

Personal details
- Born: Ricardo Andrés Neumann Bertín; 13 December 1987 (age 38) Santiago, Chile
- Party: Independent Democratic Union
- Education: Pontifical Catholic University of Chile (LL.B); Columbia University (LL.M)
- Occupation: Politician
- Profession: Lawyer

Ricardo Andrés Neumann Bertín (born 13 December 1987) is a Chilean lawyer, theatre director, and politician. He serves as deputy of the 16th District since 11 March 2026.

He served as a member of the Constitutional Convention of Chile representing District 16 between 2021 and 2022. In 2025, he was elected to the Chamber of Deputies of Chile for the same district.

== Early life, education and family ==
Neumann was born in Santiago on 13 December 1987. His parents are Ricardo Augusto Neumann Yunge, of German descent, and Martha Kisna Bertin Duhalde. He completed his primary and secondary education at the Marist Brothers Institute in San Fernando. He later moved to Santiago to study law at the Pontifical Catholic University of Chile, graduating as a lawyer after admission to the Supreme Court of Chile.

During his university years, he ran unsuccessfully in 2010 for the presidency of the Federation of Students of the Pontifical Catholic University of Chile (FEUC). He later pursued a master’s degree in Theatre Arts Administration at Columbia University in New York.

He is married to Chilean biologist and educator Luz María Magdalena Couyoumdjian Stange.

== Professional career ==
After qualifying as a lawyer, Neumann worked as an associate at the law firm Arteaga-Gorziglia. He later served as executive director of the program Jóvenes al Servicio de Chile at the Jaime Guzmán Foundation (FJG) and as director of the Fundación para el Progreso between 2020 and 2021, resigning to run for the Constitutional Convention.

While residing in the United States, he worked at the Manhattan Theatre Club on Broadway as a legal adviser and theatrical producer.

== Political career ==
In 2021, Neumann ran as an independent candidate for the Constitutional Convention within the Vamos por Chile electoral pact, with support from the Independent Democratic Union (UDI), and was elected representing District 16.

Ideologically, he has expressed support for economic liberalism and for conservative liberal positions in social and cultural matters.

For the 2025 Chilean general election, Neumann ran for the Chamber of Deputies of Chile representing District 16 with support from the UDI, and was elected with 12.20% of the vote, becoming the district’s leading candidate.
