= César Uribe Araya =

Chilean constituent (born 1983)

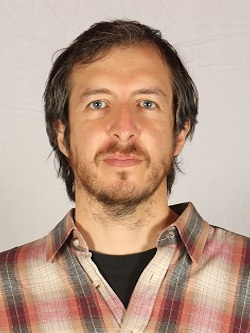

Member of the Constitutional Convention
- In office 4 July 2021 – 4 July 2022
- Constituency: 16th District

Personal details
- Born: 28 November 1983 (age 42) San Fabián de Alico, Chile
- Other political affiliations: The List of the People (2021―2022)
- Education: University of the Bío-Bío
- Profession: Architect

César Uribe Araya (born 28 November 1983) is a Chilean architect and independent politician.

He served as a member of the Constitutional Convention, representing the 19th electoral district of the Ñuble Region.

== Biography ==
Uribe was born on 28 November 1983 in San Fabián de Alico. He is the son of César Omer Uribe Moron and Inés del Carmen Araya Becerra.

He completed his primary education at Liceo C-88 Jorge Alessandri Rodríguez in San Fabián and his secondary education at Colegio San Vicente de Paul in Chillán. He studied architecture at the University of Bío-Bío, qualifying as an architect in 2010.

He worked at the Directorate of Works of the Municipality of Futaleufú, Los Lagos Region, serving as Director of Works. He later returned to the Ñuble Region, where he worked in the Directorate of Works and the Department of Environment of the Municipality of San Fabián.

== Political career ==
Uribe has been an independent politician and has been a socio-environmental activist for more than ten years. He is a co-founder of the environmental organization Ñuble Libre and of environmental coordination groups such as Ñuble Sustentable and the Network for Free Rivers.

These organizations have led efforts to defend the Ñuble River against projects such as the Punilla Reservoir and the HidroÑuble Hydroelectric Plant in the municipality of San Fabián, Ñuble Region.

In the elections held on 15–16 May 2021, he ran as an independent candidate for the Constitutional Convention representing the 19th electoral district of the Ñuble Region as part of the La Lista del Pueblo electoral pact, receiving 16,039 votes (10.2% of the validly cast votes).
