= Natalia Henríquez =

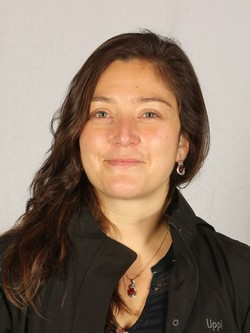

Member of the Constitutional Convention
- In office 4 July 2021 – 4 July 2022
- Constituency: 9th District

Personal details
- Born: 9 June 1985 (age 41) Santiago, Chile
- Other political affiliations: The List of the People (2021–2022)
- Education: Pontifical Catholic University of Chile (B.Sc); University of Santiago (M.Sc)

Natalia Henríquez Carreño (born 9 July 1985) is a Chilean physician and independent politician.

She served as a member of the Constitutional Convention, representing the 9th District of the Santiago Metropolitan Region, and was Vice President Adjunct of the Convention between 26 October 2021 and 6 January 2022.

== Biography ==
Henríquez Carreño was born in Santiago on 9 July 1985. She is the daughter of Armando Henríquez Calderón and Esther Carreño Bustamante.

She completed her primary and secondary education at Colegio Santa Rosa in the commune of San Miguel, graduating in 2003. In 2004, she began her medical studies at the University of Santiago, Chile, where she obtained her medical degree. She later specialized in internal medicine.

Professionally, she has worked in primary health care at family health centers (CESFAM) in the communes of Recoleta and Independencia. During the period of the Constitutional Convention, she served as an internal medicine physician at Hospital San José in Santiago. She is also pursuing a master's degree in Public Health at the Pontifical Catholic University of Chile and is a columnist for The Clinic newspaper.

== Public career ==
Henríquez Carreño began her political involvement as a student leader during her secondary education and later as a medical student, where she held positions including Academic Councillor, Vice President, and President of the student council. In 2015, she served as president of the Chilean Association of Medical Residents.

Following her specialization, she was elected Regional Councillor of the Santiago Medical Association, serving as its president between 2018 and 2020. During this period, she promoted organizational strengthening, leadership training programs in collaboration with the Latin American Faculty of Social Sciences (FLACSO), and participated in the statutory reform commission that introduced gender parity in the association’s elections.

In the elections held on 15 and 16 May 2021, she ran as an independent candidate for the Constitutional Convention representing the 9th District of the Metropolitan Region, as part of La Lista del Pueblo. She obtained 17,903 votes, equivalent to 5.65% of the valid votes cast.

On 26 October 2021, in accordance with the Convention’s regulations, she was appointed Vice President Adjunct of the Convention’s Board, a position she held until 6 January 2022.
