= Wilfredo Bacian =

Chilean constituent

Wilfredo Bacián
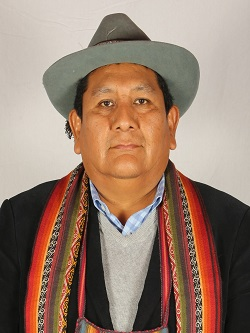

Member of the Constitutional Convention
- In office 4 July 2021 – 4 July 2022
- Constituency: Reserved seat

Personal details
- Born: Wilfredo Manuel Bacian Delgado; 27 September 1975 (age 50) Pozo Almonte, Chile
- Party: None
- Education: Arturo Prat University (BA)
- Occupation: Constituent
- Profession: Cultural manager

Wilfredo Bacian Delgado (born 27 September 1975, Pozo Almonte, Chile) is a Chilean cultural manager and politician. He served as a member of the Constitutional Convention of Chile through the reserved seats for Indigenous peoples, representing the Quechua people.

He previously served as a municipal councillor for the commune of Pozo Almonte from 2004 to 2008. During the Convention’s regulatory phase, he acted as coordinator of the Commission on Indigenous Participation and Consultation, and later served as coordinator of the Standing Commission on Indigenous Peoples’ Rights and Plurinationality.

== Early life and education ==
Bacian Delgado was born on 27 September 1975 in Pozo Almonte. He is the son of Guillermo Bacian Quihuata, a Quechua leader, and Timotea Delgado Capetillo. He is unmarried.

He completed his secondary education at Colegio Inglés in Iquique. He is a cultural manager and holds a diploma in territorial development. He is also a graduate of the Territorial Facilitators course (Dinamizadores/as Territoriales) of SUS-TER at the University of Caldas in Colombia.

== Political and public career ==
Bacian Delgado is a member and leader of the Indigenous Quechua Community of Quipisca in the Tarapacá Region. He served as president of the National Council of the Quechua People and has worked in coordination with other Quechua organizations in the defense of ancestral heritage and the promotion of equality and freedom of religion.

He was formerly a member of the Christian Democratic Party (PDC). He was elected as a PDC councillor for the commune of Pozo Almonte for the 2004–2008 term, later resigning from the party in 2011. He subsequently ran as a candidate for councillor in 2012, first as a party-affiliated candidate and later as an independent, without being elected.

In the elections held on 15 and 16 May 2021, Bacian Delgado ran for a reserved Indigenous seat representing the Quechua people (covering the regions of Arica y Parinacota, Tarapacá, and Antofagasta). He obtained 632 votes, corresponding to 30.44% of the valid votes cast.

== Constitutional Convention ==
Within the Constitutional Convention, Bacian Delgado supported the drafting of a plurinational, non-subsidiary state with guaranteed social rights. He advocated for explicit constitutional recognition of Indigenous peoples’ right to self-determination and for the legal recognition of territorial organizations as public legal entities. His proposals emphasized territorial autonomies through which Indigenous peoples would govern matters such as water, land, ancestral heritage, biodiversity, education, health, and community justice.

During the regulatory phase of the Convention, he served on the Rules Commission and on the Commission on Indigenous Participation and Consultation, the latter of which he coordinated. He later joined the Thematic Commission on Form of the State, Territorial Organization, Autonomy, Decentralization, Equity, Territorial Justice, Local Governments and Fiscal Organization, as well as the Commission on Indigenous Peoples’ Rights and Plurinationality, where he was elected coordinator on 21 February 2022. In May 2022, he also joined the Preamble Commission.
