= Loreto Vallejos =

Chilean politician

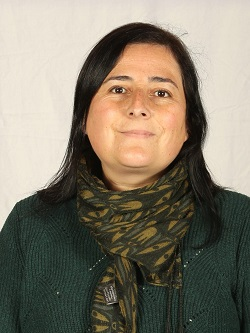

Member of the Constitutional Convention
- In office 4 July 2021 – 4 July 2022
- Constituency: 15th District

Personal details
- Born: 9 February 1980 (age 46) Vina del Mar, Chile
- Other political affiliations: The List of the People; Pueblo Constituyente
- Education: Pontifical Catholic University of Valparaíso (BA)
- Occupation: Constituent
- Profession: Teacher of History and Geography

Loreto Vallejos Dávila (born 9 February 1980) is a Chilean history and geography teacher and independent politician.

She was elected as a member of the Constitutional Convention in 2021, representing the 15th District of the Libertador General Bernardo O'Higgins Region.

During the Convention, she served as coordinator of the Committees on Communications, Information and Transparency, and on Constitutional Principles, Democracy, Nationality, and Citizenship.

== Early life and family ==
Vallejos was born in Santiago on 9 February 1980. She is the daughter of Víctor Luis Vallejos Montecinos and Ana María Cristina Dávila Videla. She is married and has three children.

== Professional career ==
Vallejos completed her primary and secondary education at Colegio Ana María Janer in Viña del Mar, graduating in 1997. She later studied history and geography education at the Pontifical Catholic University of Valparaíso, qualifying as a teacher.

She worked as a teacher in various educational institutions before transitioning into roles as a coach and workshop facilitator. She has conducted online workshops on civic education, personal development, and the empowerment of women entrepreneurs.

== Political career ==
Vallejos is an independent politician.

In the elections held on 15–16 May 2021, she ran as an independent candidate for the Constitutional Convention representing the 15th District of the Libertador General Bernardo O'Higgins Region, as part of The People's List – 100% Independents (La Lista del Pueblo 100% Independientes). She obtained 17,061 votes, corresponding to 9.42% of the valid votes cast, and was elected as a member of the Convention.

During the Convention’s proceedings, she served as coordinator of the Committees on Communications, Information and Transparency, and on Constitutional Principles, Democracy, Nationality, and Citizenship.
