= María Cecilia Ubilla =

Chilean lawyer

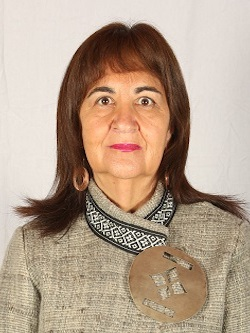

Member of the Constitutional Convention
- In office 4 July 2021 – 4 July 2022
- Constituency: 25th District

Personal details
- Born: 18 March 1956 (age 70) Osorno, Chile
- Education: Pontifical Catholic University of Chile (LL.B)
- Profession: Lawyer

María Cecilia Ubilla Pérez (born 18 March 1956) is a Chilean lawyer and independent politician. She was elected as a member of the Constitutional Convention in 2021, representing the 25th District of the Los Lagos Region.

She previously served as a municipal councillor of Osorno between 2008 and 2012.

== Biography ==
Ubilla was born on 18 March 1956 in Osorno, Chile. She is the daughter of Sergio Armando Ubilla Machiavello and Ruth Eliana Pérez Evoy.

Ubilla completed her secondary education at the German School of Osorno. She later studied law at the Pontifical Catholic University of Chile.

== Political career ==
Ubilla is an independent politician, politically close to the Independent Democratic Union. Between 2008 and 2012, she served as a municipal councillor of the city of Osorno.

In February 2013, she was appointed Provincial Delegate of the Housing and Urbanization Service (SERVIU) in Osorno. She obtained 4,263 votes, corresponding to 4.2% of the valid votes cast, and was elected as a member of the Convention.

In the elections held on 15–16 May 2021, Ubilla ran as a candidate for the Constitutional Convention representing the 25th District of the Los Lagos Region as an independent within the Vamos por Chile electoral pact.
