= Dayana González =

Chilean political activist

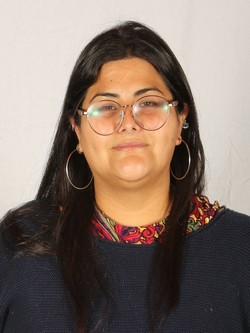

Member of the Constitutional Convention
- In office 4 July 2021 – 4 July 2022
- Constituency: 3rd District

Personal details
- Born: 31 October 1987 (age 38) Tocopilla, Chile
- Other political affiliations: The List of the People
- Education: University of Tarapacá (BA)
- Occupation: Political activist
- Profession: Teacher of History and Geography

Dayana González Araya (born 31 October 1987) is a Chilean history and geography teacher and independent politician.

She was elected as a member of the Constitutional Convention in 2021, representing the 3rd District of the Antofagasta Region.

== Biography ==
González was born in Tocopilla on 31 October 1987. She is the daughter of Héctor Avelino González Esquivel and Marianella de Lourdes Araya Urízar.

González completed her primary education at Escuela Municipal No. 3 Pablo Neruda and her secondary education at Liceo Politécnico Diego Portales Palazuelo in Tocopilla. She obtained a degree as a Teacher of History and Geography from the University of Tarapacá.

She worked professionally as a school teacher within the Chilean educational system.

== Political career ==
González is an independent politician. She is a member of Unión de Mujeres Kori Tocopilla and the Asamblea Popular Tocopilla, organizations linked to community and grassroots activism.

In the elections held on 15–16 May 2021, she ran as an independent candidate for the Constitutional Convention representing the 3rd District of the Antofagasta Region, as part of the La Lista del Pueblo electoral pact. She obtained 10,245 votes, corresponding to 6.59% of the valid votes cast, and was elected to the Convention.
