= Tomás Laibe =

Chilean politician

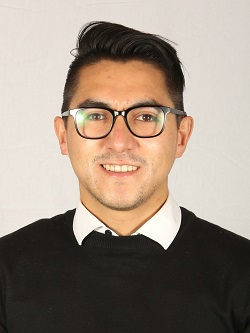

Member of the Constitutional Convention
- In office 4 July 2021 – 4 July 2022
- Constituency: 27th District

Personal details
- Born: 28 September 1990 (age 36) Puerto Aysén, Chile
- Party: Socialist Party
- Education: Diego Portales University
- Occupation: Politician
- Profession: Political scientist

Tomás Laibe Sáez (born 28 September 1990) is a Chilean political scientist and politician of the Socialist Party.

He served as a member of the Constitutional Convention of Chile, representing the 27th District of the Aysén Region, and held the position of Vice President Adjunct of the Convention from 6 January 2022.

== Biography ==
Laibe was born on 28 September 1990 in Puerto Aysén, Chile. He is the son of Eduardo Laibe Vera and Rebeca Sáez Godoy.

He completed his primary education at Colegio Santa Teresa de Los Andes in the commune of Aysén and his secondary education at Colegio Alianza Austral in Coyhaique. He studied Political Science at the Diego Portales University and later obtained a master's degree in Government and Public Management from the University of Chile.

Professionally, he worked as a legislative advisor in the National Congress for Deputy Maya Fernández and as a policy advisor for small businesses at the Ministry of Economy.

== Political career ==
A member of the Socialist Party (PS), he has been part of the leadership of the Youth of Lebanese Origin and has served as a volunteer for Fundación Iguales, developing activism related to the LGBTIQ+ community.

In the elections held on 15 and 16 May 2021, he ran as a candidate for the Constitutional Convention representing the 27th District of the Aysén Region, as part of the Lista del Apruebo pact. He obtained 4,291 votes, corresponding to 13.12% of the valid votes cast.

On 6 January 2022, in accordance with the Convention's regulations on the incorporation of adjunct vice presidencies, he was ratified as Vice President Adjunct of the Convention’s Board.

Subsequently, on 10 November 2022, he began working at the Ministry of Finance, where his role focused on institutional relations with trade associations, business organizations, members of parliament, and other government ministries.
