= Andrés Cruz Carrasco =

Chilean lawyer (born 1974)

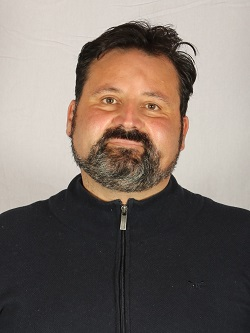

Member of the Constitutional Convention
- In office 4 July 2021 – 4 July 2022
- Constituency: 20th District

Personal details
- Born: 4 June 1974 (age 52) Concepción, Chile
- Education: University of Concepción (LL.B) (LL.M)
- Profession: Lawyer

Andrés Cruz Carrasco (born 4 June 1973) is a Chilean lawyer. He served as a member of the Constitutional Convention, representing the 20th electoral district of the Biobío Region.

From 2001 to 2011, he served in the Public Prosecutor’s Office in Curicó, Coyhaique, Coronel, and Talcahuano, holding positions as Assistant Prosecutor, Deputy Prosecutor, and Chief Prosecutor of the last city.

Since 2016, he has collaborated with the citizen newspaper La Ventana Ciudadana and with Diario de Concepción.

== Biography ==
Cruz Carrasco was born on 4 June 1973 in Concepción. He is the son of Carlos Cruz Echeverría and Rosa Carrasco Lagos, both teachers. He is married to lawyer Tania Galgani Ugarte.

He completed his primary and secondary education at Lycée Charles de Gaulle of the Alliance Française in Concepción. In 1993, he began his higher education at the Faculty of Legal and Social Sciences of the University of Concepción (UdeC), earning a degree in Legal and Social Sciences. During his university years, he served as a teaching assistant in Labour Law. He was admitted to the bar before the Supreme Court of Justice on 27 March 2000.

He earned a PhD in Law from the University of Salamanca (USAL), Spain, in September 2019. His doctoral dissertation was titled Proceso y enemigo: sistema criminal y amenazas emergentes. He also holds a Master’s degree in Moral Philosophy from the University of Concepción, a Master’s degree in Criminal Policy from the USAL, and a M.D. in Political science, Security, and Defense from the National Academy of Political and Strategic Studies (ANEPE) and the UdeC. He has published various academic articles in his field.

Professionally, he works in private practice. Since 2013, he has been a professor in the Department of Procedural Law at the Faculty of Legal and Social Sciences of the UdeC, teaching undergraduate and postgraduate courses. He has also taught at Universidad de the Americas, Chile and Universidad Santo Tomás.

== Political and public career ==
He began his political participation as vice president of his school’s student council. In the professional and civic sphere, he has been involved with the Regional Development Corporation of Biobío (Corbiobío), serving as both president and vice president.

In the elections held on 15–16 May 2021, he ran as an independent candidate for the Constitutional Convention representing the 20th electoral district of the Biobío Region, on a Socialist Party (PS) list within the Lista del Apruebo electoral pact. He received 10,937 votes, corresponding to 3.58% of the validly cast votes.
