= Mario Vargas Vidal =

Chilean constituent

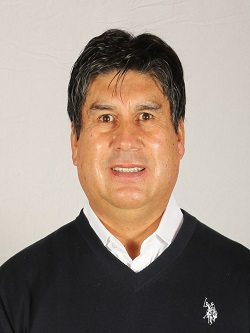

Member of the Constitutional Convention
- In office 4 July 2021 – 4 July 2022
- Constituency: 25th District

Personal details
- Born: 7 February 1963 (age 63) Osorno, Chile
- Party: Socialist Party
- Education: Metropolitan University of Technology (Lic.); Metropolitan University of Educational Sciences (M.D.)
- Profession: Biologist

Mario Vargas Vidal (born 7 February 1963) is a Chilean teacher and politician of the Socialist Party of Chile.

He served as a member of the Constitutional Convention, representing the 25th electoral district of the Los Lagos Region.

== Biography ==
Vargas was born on 7 February 1963. He is the son of Aníbal Vargas and Blanca Hilda Vidal Catalán. He is married to Julia María Flores Cortés and has three children.

He is a trained teacher. He obtained a Bachelor’s degree in Education from the Metropolitan Technological University (UTEM) and later earned a Master’s degree in Educational Management from the Metropolitan University of Educational Sciences (UMCE).

Until his election as a constituent convention member, he worked professionally as a school counselor at Liceo Eleuterio Ramírez in Osorno.

== Political career ==
Vargas is a member of the Socialist Party of Chile (PS). He has an extensive background in social and community work in the Los Lagos Region. He was a founder of the Red Infancia Osorno, a co-founder of the Water Movement, a co-founder of the Unidos Social Movement, a collaborator of the Osorno communal environmental network, and president of the organization of lay men and women of Osorno.

In the elections held on 15–16 May 2021, he ran as a candidate for the Constitutional Convention representing the 25th electoral district of the Los Lagos Region as part of the Lista del Apruebo electoral pact, receiving 5,817 votes (5.8% of the validly cast votes).
