= Camila Zárate Zárate =

Chilean political activist

Camila Zárate
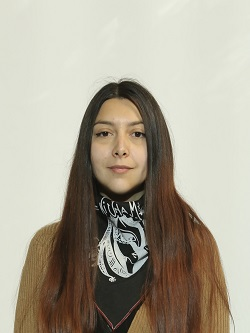

Member of the Constitutional Convention
- In office 4 July 2021 – 4 July 2022
- Constituency: 7th District

Personal details
- Born: 4 January 1992 (age 34) Santiago, Chile
- Other political affiliations: The List of the People (2021–2022)
- Education: University of Chile (LL.B); University of Santiago, Chile (PgD)
- Occupation: Political activist
- Profession: Lawyer

Camila Zárate Zárate (born 4 January 1992) is a Chilean environmental activist, ecofeminist, and independent politician.

She served as a member of the Constitutional Convention from 2021 to 2022, representing the 7th District of the Valparaíso Region. During her tenure, she coordinated the Convention’s Committee on Environment, Rights of Nature, Common Natural Goods, and Economic Model.

== Early life and education ==
Zárate was born on 4 January 1992 in Santiago, Chile. She is the daughter of Emilio Zárate Moraga and Cecilia Zárate Aguilera. She is unmarried.

She completed her primary education at Colegio La Concepción in La Florida and her secondary education at Liceo A-43 of Providencia and Liceo 7 de Niñas Luisa Saavedra in Santiago, graduating in 2009. She later studied law at the University of Chile, where her undergraduate thesis was titled “A New Legal Status for Non-Human Animals” (2020). She also holds a diploma in Sustainable Education from the University of Santiago of Chile (USACH).

== Political and activist career ==
Zárate began her political involvement as a student leader at Liceo 7, where she participated in the Chilean secondary student movement known as the Penguin Revolution. During her university years, she served as vice president of the Student Council of the Bachelor’s Program and, between 2013 and 2015, as Environmental Delegate of the Federation of Students of the University of Chile (FECh).

She became involved with the Movement for Water and Territories (Movimiento por el Agua y los Territorios, MAT), serving as its Central Zone spokesperson between 2018 and 2019 and as Valparaíso spokesperson in 2020. Since 2017, she has also participated in environmental advocacy related to the protection of the sclerophyllous forest in the pre-Andean areas and in the Valparaíso region.

In the elections held on 15–16 May 2021, Zárate ran as an independent candidate for the Constitutional Convention representing the 7th District of the Valparaíso Region, as part of La Lista del Pueblo. She obtained 18,935 votes, corresponding to 5.72% of the valid votes cast, and was elected to the Convention.

Within the Convention, she served as coordinator of the Committee on Environment, Rights of Nature, Common Natural Goods, and Economic Model.
