= Carolina Videla =

Chilean scholar

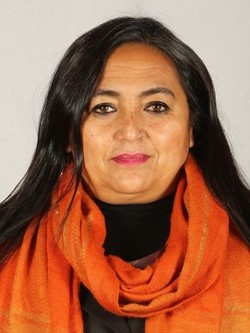

Member of the Constitutional Convention
- In office 4 July 2021 – 4 July 2022
- Constituency: 1st District

Personal details
- Born: 22 December 1968 (age 57) Santiago, Chile
- Party: Communist Party
- Education: Santo Tomás University (BA)
- Occupation: University teacher
- Profession: Social worker

Carolina Videla Osorio (born 22 December 1968) is a Chilean social worker and politician.

She was elected as a member of the Chilean Constitutional Convention in 2021, representing the 1st District of the Arica and Parinacota Region.

== Early life and family ==
Videla was born on 22 December 1968 in Santiago, Chile. She is the daughter of Luis Ricardo Videla Muñoz and Ana Mercedes Osorio Guevara.

She is married to Joris A. Doris Van Parys and has two children.

== Education and professional career ==
Videla completed her secondary education at Escuela Ricardo Silva Arriagada in the city of Arica. She holds a licentiate degree in social work.

She has worked as a cultural manager and folk singer. Between 2001 and 2004, she served as Coordinator of the Office of Culture of the Regional Government of Tarapacá. She later worked on various social assistance and cultural initiatives.

From 2013, she served as Head of the Municipal Consumer Office of the Municipality of Arica. She currently works as Coordinator of Professional Internships and as a lecturer in the Social Work degree program at the Universidad Santo Tomás campus in Arica.

== Political activity ==
Videla has been a member of the Communist Party of Chile since 1989. Toward the end of the military dictatorship of Augusto Pinochet, she was detained as a political prisoner in 1988.

She is a member of the organization Mujeres Memoria y Derechos Humanos and of the Movimiento Mujeres de Luto Arica. She was also a founding member of the first Union of Honorary Workers of the Municipality of Arica.

In the elections held on 15–16 May 2021, she ran as a candidate for the Constitutional Convention representing the 1st District of the Arica and Parinacota Region on behalf of the Communist Party of Chile, as part of the Apruebo Dignidad electoral pact. She obtained 3,629 votes, corresponding to 6.34% of the valid votes cast.
