= Mariela Serey =

Chilean constituent

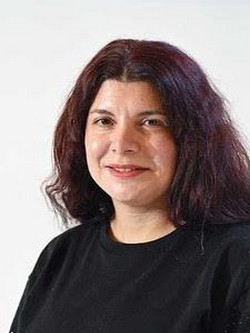

Member of the Constitutional Convention
- In office 4 July 2021 – 4 July 2022
- Constituency: 6th District

Personal details
- Born: 22 December 1980 (age 45) Valparaíso, Chile
- Party: Social Convergence
- Profession: School teacher

Mariela Serey Jiménez (born 22 December 1980) is a Chilean primary education teacher and independent politician.

She served as a member of the Constitutional Convention, representing the 6th electoral district of the Valparaíso Region.

== Biography ==
Serey was born on 22 December 1980. She is the daughter of Wenceslao Serey Serey and Sonia Jiménez Vea. She is married to Felipe Baeza Daroch.

She completed her secondary education in 1998 at the Scuola Italiana Arturo Dell’Oro in Valparaíso. She later studied Primary Education Teaching, qualifying as a General Basic Education teacher.

She has worked professionally as a teacher in the municipalities of Valparaíso and Villa Alemana.

=== Public career ===
Serey is an activist and the founder and president of the caregivers’ association Yo Cuido, which supports people caring for individuals with functional diversity.

In the elections held on 15–16 May 2021, she ran as an independent candidate for the Constitutional Convention representing the 6th electoral district of the Valparaíso Region, on a Social Convergence Party slot within the Apruebo Dignidad electoral pact. Her campaign slogan was “For a caring state”. She received 11,842 votes, corresponding to 3.61% of the validly cast votes.
