= Carolina Sepúlveda Sepúlveda =

Chilean politician

Carolina Sepúlveda
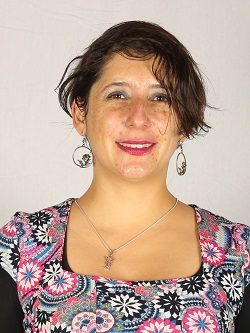

Member of the Constitutional Convention
- In office 4 July 2021 – 4 July 2022
- Constituency: 19th District

Personal details
- Born: 6 June 1980 (age 46) San Carlos, Chile
- Party: Non-Neutral Independents (2020−2022)
- Education: University of Concepción
- Profession: Chemical engineer

Carolina Sepúlveda Sepúlveda (born 6 June 1980) is a Chilean agricultural engineering scholar, chemical civil engineer, and independent politician.

She served as a member of the Constitutional Convention, representing the 19th electoral district of the Ñuble Region.

== Biography ==
Sepúlveda was born on 6 June 1980 in San Carlos, Ñuble Region. She is the daughter of Heriberto del Carmen Sepúlveda Faúndez and María Elisa Sepúlveda Sepúlveda.

She studied chemical civil engineering at the University of Concepción (UdeC). At the same institution, she obtained a Master’s degree in Integrated Management: Environment, Occupational Risks, and Corporate Social Responsibility, and later earned a PhD in Agricultural Engineering.

She has worked as a lecturer at the UdeC. She has also developed professional work in research, teaching, and the application of renewable energies in agriculture at the Agricultural Development Institute (INDAP), within the framework of a cooperation agreement between that institution and the Ministry of Energy.

=== Political career ===
Sepúlveda was a member of the Non-Neutral Independents movement.

In the elections held on 15–16 May 2021, she ran as an independent candidate for the Constitutional Convention representing the 19th electoral district of the Ñuble Region as part of the Independents of Ñuble for a New Constitution electoral pact, receiving 6,993 votes (4.5% of the validly cast votes).
