= Marco Arellano =

Chilean public administrator

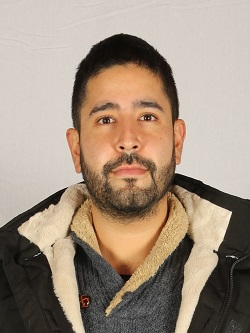

Member of the Constitutional Convention
- In office 4 July 2021 – 4 July 2022
- Constituency: 8th District

Personal details
- Born: 29 December 1989 (age 36)
- Other political affiliations: The List of the People (2021–2022)
- Education: University of Concepción (BA)
- Profession: Public administration

Marco Arellano Ortega (born 29 December 1989) is a Chilean public administrator, environmental activist, and independent politician.

He served as a member of the Constitutional Convention of Chile, representing the 8th District of the Metropolitan Region.

== Biography ==
Arellano was born on 29 December 1989 in Santiago, Chile. He is the son of Jorge Arellano Castelar and Claudia Ortega Navarro.

He completed his primary education at Colegio Nuestra Señora María Inmaculada in the commune of El Bosque and his secondary education at Liceo Manuel Barros Borgoño in Santiago, graduating in 2007. He studied Public Administration at the University of Concepción, where he earned a degree in Political Science and Public Administration.

In his professional career, he has participated in various projects and related activities in the field of public administration.

== Political career ==
Arellano’s public trajectory as a social leader and activist has focused on environmental defense, particularly the protection of wetlands and opposition to polluting companies, mainly in the commune of Quilicura.

In the elections held on 15 and 16 May 2021, he ran as an independent candidate for the Constitutional Convention representing the 8th District of the Santiago Metropolitan Region, as part of La Lista del Pueblo. He obtained 20,367 votes, corresponding to 4.50% of the valid votes cast.

On 28 December 2021, he announced his resignation from the Pueblo Constituyente collective, remaining thereafter as an independent member of the Constitutional Convention.
