= Miguel Ángel Botto =

Chilean politician

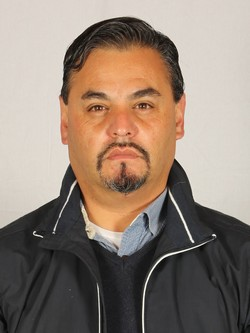

Member of the Constitutional Convention
- In office 4 July 2021 – 4 July 2022
- Constituency: 6th District

Personal details
- Born: 14 November 1968 (age 57) Quilpué, Chile
- Party: Christian Democracy; Non-Neutral Independents (2021−2022); Democrats (2022−2025)
- Education: Pontifical Catholic University of Valparaíso (BA)
- Occupation: Constituent
- Profession: Business manager

Miguel Botto Salinas (born 14 November 1968) is a Chilean commercial engineer, singer-songwriter, academic, and independent politician.

He was elected as a member of the Constitutional Convention in 2021, representing the 6th District of the Valparaíso Region.

== Early life and family ==
Botto was born on 14 November 1968 in Quilpué, Chile. He is the son of Roberto Botto Duranc and María Salinas.

He is married to Loreto Parra Cuadra and has three children.

== Education and professional career ==
Botto completed his primary education at Escuela Básica No. 84 and his secondary education at Liceo A-39 Guillermo Gronemeyer Zamorano in Quilpué. He studied commercial engineering at the Pontifical Catholic University of Valparaíso.

He holds a master’s degree in Educational Management from the European University of Madrid and Andrés Bello University.

In his professional career, he has worked as a university academic in Chile and Ecuador, as a consultant, and as a business leader in the educational and real estate sectors. He has also developed artistic work as a singer-songwriter.

== Political career ==
Botto began his political involvement as vice president of the student council at the Liceo de Quilpué. He later served as general coordinator of the First Youth Council of Quilpué and was a founder of the RESO Association for Social Recognition. He is a member of the Independents Not Neutral movement.

In the elections held on 15–16 May 2021, Botto ran as an independent candidate for the Constitutional Convention representing the 6th District of the Valparaíso Region, within the Independents for the New Constitution list. He obtained 3,779 votes, corresponding to 1.15% of the valid votes cast, and entered the Convention through the gender parity correction mechanism, becoming the sole representative of his electoral list.

On 2 November 2022, he joined the launch of the new Democrats party. Three years later, the party was dissolved after a poor electoral performance.
