= Constanza San Juan =

Chilean political activist

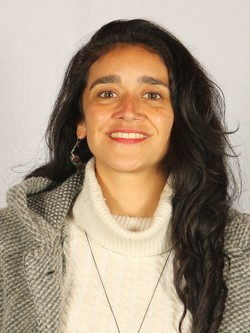

Member of the Constitutional Convention
- In office 4 July 2021 – 4 July 2022
- Constituency: 4th District

Personal details
- Born: 18 September 1985 (age 40) Santiago, Chile
- Other political affiliations: The List of the People
- Education: University of Chile
- Occupation: Political activist
- Profession: Teacher

Constanza San Juan Standen (born 18 September 1985) is a Chilean historian and independent politician. She was elected as a member of the Constitutional Convention in 2021, representing the 4th District of the Atacama Region.

In 2018, she was spokeswoman of the Assembly for Huasco Alto against Pascua Lama.

== Biography ==
San Juan was born in Santiago on 18 September 1985. She is the daughter of Mauricio Alberto San Juan Trujillo and Inés Standen Arriagada.

San Juan completed her primary and secondary education at Colegio Calasanz in Ñuñoa. She pursued higher education at the University of Chile, where she earned a degree as a Licentiate in History.

== Political activism ==
San Juan is an independent politician with a background in socio-environmental activism. She has served as spokesperson for the Assembly for Water of Huasco Alto and, in that capacity, has been involved with the Movement for Water and Territories (Movimiento por el Agua y los Territorios, MAT) and the Coordination of Territories for the Defense of Glaciers.

She participated in the design and implementation of a community-based, communicational, and legal strategy that led to the judicial closure of the Pascua Lama mining project in September 2020.

In the elections held on 15–16 May 2021, San Juan ran as an independent candidate for the Constitutional Convention representing the 4th District of the Atacama Region, as part of the Asamblea Constituyente Atacama pact. She obtained 7,913 votes, corresponding to 9.61% of the valid votes cast, and was elected as a member of the Convention.
