= Paulina Veloso Muñoz =

Chilean constituent

Paulina Veloso
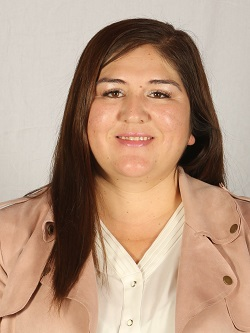

Member of the Constitutional Convention
- In office 4 July 2021 – 4 July 2022
- Constituency: 21st District

Personal details
- Born: 21 June 1987 (age 38) Lota, Chile
- Party: Renovación Nacional
- Children: Two
- Parent(s): Jorge Veloso Rodríguez; Raquel Muñoz Salgado

Paulina Veloso Muñoz (born 21 July 1987) is a Chilean law graduate and politician.

A member of National Renewal, she was elected as a member of the Constitutional Convention in 2021, representing the 21st District of the Biobío Region.

== Biography ==
Veloso was born on 21 July 1987 in Lota, Chile. She is the daughter of Jorge Enrique Veloso Rodríguez and Raquel Inés Muñoz Salgado.

Veloso completed her secondary education at Liceo Comercial Femenino of Concepción. She holds a licentiate degree in law and has completed diploma programs in cultural management and social leadership.

== Political career ==
Veloso is a member of National Renewal.

In the elections held on 15–16 May 2021, she ran as a candidate for the Constitutional Convention representing the 21st District of the Biobío Region as part of the Vamos por Chile electoral pact. She obtained 8,559 votes, corresponding to 5.1% of the valid votes cast, and was elected as a member of the Convention.

In November 2021, she endorsed José Antonio Kast's presidential campaign.

During the Convention’s regulatory phase, she served on the Popular Participation and Territorial Equity Commission. She later joined the thematic commission on Constitutional Principles, Democracy, Nationality, and Citizenship.

From May to June 2022, she served on the Harmonization Commission of the Convention.
