= Jorge Abarca Riveros =

Chilean constituent

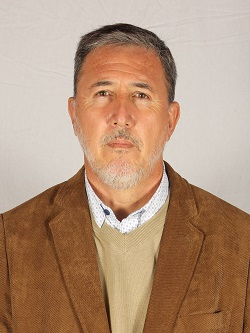

Member of the Constitutional Convention
- In office 4 July 2021 – 4 July 2022
- Constituency: 1st District

Personal details
- Born: 1 August 1967 (age 59) Arica, Chile
- Education: Pontifical Catholic University of Valparaíso (BA); Complutense University of Madrid (MA)
- Occupation: Constituent
- Profession: Biologist

Jorge Abarca Riveros (born 1 August 1967, Arica, Chile) is a Chilean biology teacher and independent politician.

He served as a member of the Constitutional Convention of Chile, representing District 1 of the Arica y Parinacota Region. During his term, he acted as coordinator of the convention's Preamble Commission.

== Biography ==
Abarca Riveros was born in Arica. He is the son of Jorge Abarca Zúñiga and Mery Olimpia del Carmen Riveros Flores.

He obtained a degree as a biology teacher and a licentiate in biology from the Pontifical Catholic University of Valparaíso. He completed postgraduate studies at the Complutense University of Madrid, where he is also a doctoral candidate in science.

He has worked as a university professor and researcher at various institutions. In recent years, he has served at the Faculty of Agronomic Sciences of the University of Tarapacá. He is the author and co-author of several scientific outreach publications on biodiversity, fauna, and ecosystems, and his research has focused on biodiversity and ancestral cultures of northern Chile, including the Chinchorro culture and other pre-Inca peoples.

== Political career ==
Abarca Riveros has served as president of the Environmental Committee of the municipality of Arica and as a defender of the Lluta River wetland.

In the elections held on 15 and 16 May 2021, he ran as an independent candidate for the Constitutional Convention representing District 1 of the Arica y Parinacota Region, as part of the "Apruebo" electoral pact, on a seat allocated to the Liberal Party. He received 3,251 votes, corresponding to 5.68% of the valid votes cast.

During the work of the Constitutional Convention, he participated in the Commission on Decentralization, Equity, and Territorial Justice. He later joined the Thematic Commission on Environment, Rights of Nature, Common Natural Goods, and Economic Model, and from 11 May 2022 served as coordinator of the Preamble Commission.
