= Guillermo Namor Kong =

Chilean scholar

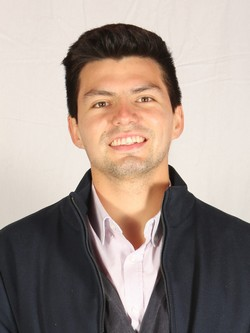

Member of the Constitutional Convention
- In office 4 July 2021 – 4 July 2022
- Constituency: 4th District

Personal details
- Born: 27 November 1996 (age 29) Vallenar, Chile
- Party: Non-Neutral Independents (2020−2021)
- Education: University of Chile (LL.B)
- Profession: Lawyer

Guillermo Namor Kong (born 27 November 1996) is a Chilean independent politician.

He was elected as a member of the Constitutional Convention in 2021, representing the 4th District of the Atacama Region.

== Early life and family ==
Namor was born in Vallenar on 27 November 1996. He is the son of Guillermo Alejandro Namor Esbry and Cecilia Paola Kong Jofré.

== Professional career ==
Namor completed his primary education at Liceo San Francisco of Vallenar and his secondary education at Colegio SS.CC. of La Serena. He studied law at the University of Chile between 2015 and 2019, graduating as a law graduate (egresado).

Since 2018, he has served as a teaching assistant in courses including Administrative Law, Procedural Law, Competition Procedures, Regulatory Procedure, and Corporate Criminal Law at the Faculty of Law of the University of Chile. Between November 2018 and May 2020, he worked as a legal clerk (procurador) in the Litigation Division of the National Economic Prosecutor’s Office.

== Political career ==
Namor is an independent politician and a member of the Independents Non-Neutral movement (Independientes No Neutrales).

In the elections held on 15–16 May 2021, he ran as an independent candidate for the Constitutional Convention representing the 4th District of the Atacama Region, as part of the Independientes por la Nueva Constitución electoral pact. He obtained 4,047 votes, corresponding to 4.92% of the valid votes cast, and was elected as a member of the Convention.
