= Vanessa Hoppe =

Chilean scholar

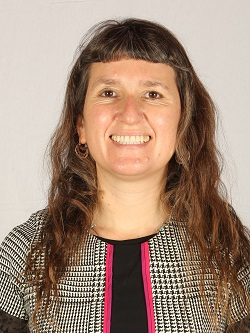

Member of the Constitutional Convention
- In office 4 July 2021 – 4 July 2022
- Constituency: 21st District

Personal details
- Born: 27 December 1979 (age 46) Chile
- Education: ARCIS University (LL.B); University of Seville (LL.M)
- Occupation: Constituent
- Profession: Lawyer

Vanessa Hoppe Espoz (born 27 December 1979) is a Chilean lawyer and independent politician. She was elected as a member of the Constitutional Convention in 2021, representing the 21st District of the Biobío Region.

During the Convention, she served as coordinator of the Committee on the Justice System, Autonomous Oversight Bodies, and Constitutional Reform.

== Early life and family ==
Hoppe was born in Santiago on 27 December 1979. She is the daughter of Cristián Federico Hoppe Guíñez and Diana Alejandra de Lourdes Espoz Goñi.

== Professional career ==
Hoppe studied law at ARCIS University and later obtained a master’s degree in criminal law from the University of Seville, with a specialization in human rights. She also completed a postgraduate program in Indigenous Rights, Environment, and Dialogue Processes under ILO Convention 169 at the University of Chile.

Professionally, she has worked in the field of indigenous civil law and has been involved in community education on constitutional matters through free and open workshops.

Since 2015, she has served as an indigenous defense lawyer in the Legal Defense Program (PDJ) of the National Corporation for Indigenous Development (CONADI). She has also been a volunteer and territorial liaison director for ABOFEM Biobío.

== Political career ==
Hoppe is an independent politician and feminist activist. Her candidacy for the Constitutional Convention was supported by the Nahuelbuta Biobío Constituent Coordination and was centered on the proposal of an “Eco-Constitution.”

In the elections held on 15–16 May 2021, Hoppe ran as an independent candidate for the Constitutional Convention representing the 21st District of the Biobío Region, as part of the Apruebo Dignidad pact, on a slot allocated to the Communist Party of Chile. She obtained 11,203 votes, corresponding to 6.6% of the valid votes cast, and was elected as a member of the Convention.

During the Convention’s work, she served as coordinator of the Committee on the Justice System, Autonomous Oversight Bodies, and Constitutional Reform.
