= Ivanna Olivares =

Chilean politician (born 1990)

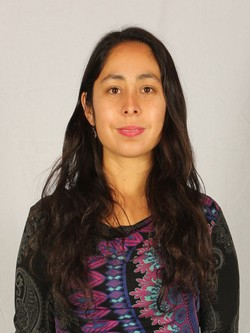

Member of the Constitutional Convention
- In office 4 July 2021 – 4 July 2022
- Constituency: 5th District

Personal details
- Born: 11 July 1990 (age 36) Salamanca, Chile
- Other political affiliations: The List of the People (2020–2021)
- Education: University of Valparaíso (BA)
- Occupation: School teacher Activist
- Profession: Teacher of History

Ivanna Olivares Miranda (born 11 July 1990) is a Chilean history teacher, cultural manager, environmental activist, and independent politician.

She was elected as a member of the Constitutional Convention in 2021, representing the 5th District of the Coquimbo Region.

== Early life and family ==
Olivares was born in Santiago on 11 July 1990. She is the daughter of Germán Olivares Chávez and Jannette Miranda Espinoza.

== Professional career ==
She completed her primary education at Escuela Matilde Salamanca and her secondary education at Liceo de Salamanca, in the Choapa Province of the Coquimbo Region, graduating in 2008. She later studied History and Education at the University of Valparaíso, where she obtained a licentiate degree in 2016 and qualified as a History teacher.

Professionally, Olivares has worked as a history teacher, cultural manager, and writer. She worked for three years at the Municipality of Salamanca, where she created the Unit for Indigenous Peoples’ Heritage within the local Cultural Office. She is co-author of the book Diaguitas del Valle de Chalinga, patrimonio, cultura e identidad.

== Political career ==
Olivares is an independent politician and environmental activist affiliated with Modatima Choapa. She serves as Chilean representative of the Movement for the Protocols of Abya Yala, an association of Indigenous and tribal organizations, technical advisers, and individuals, and is president of the Diaguita Community Taucán.

In the elections held on 15–16 May 2021, she ran as an independent candidate for the Constitutional Convention representing the 5th District of the Coquimbo Region, as part of the Lista del Pueblo within the Movimiento Territorial Constituyente. She obtained the highest vote share in the district with 22,480 votes, corresponding to 9.98% of the valid votes cast, and was elected to the Convention.
