= Fernando Tirado Soto =

Chilean constituent

Fernando Tirado
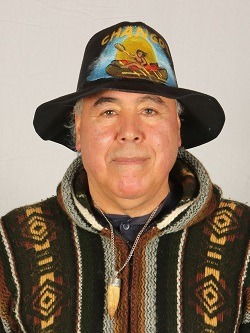

Member of the Constitutional Convention
- In office 4 July 2021 – 4 July 2022
- Constituency: Reserved Seat

Personal details
- Born: 22 November 1953 (age 72) Los Vilos, Chile
- Occupation: Diving

Fernando del Carmen Tirado Soto (born 22 November 1953, Los Vilos, Chile) is a Chilean agricultural and fisheries technician and politician.

He served as a member of the Constitutional Convention of Chile, representing the Chango people. He was elected through the reserved seats for Indigenous peoples. He also served as a municipal councillor for the commune of Los Vilos from 2012 to 2016.

== Biography ==
Tirado Soto was born in Los Vilos, Coquimbo Region. He is the son of Vidal Tirado Bugueño and Etelvina del Carmen Soto.

== Political career ==
During the military regime in Chile, he participated in the formation of the first organization of artisanal fishers in the Coquimbo Region. He has been a leader of artisanal fishers' and shellfish divers' organizations in the region, and served as president of the Federation of Fishers' Unions of the Coquimbo Region (FEDEPESCA).

In municipal elections, he was elected councillor for the commune of Los Vilos for the 2012–2016 term, receiving 564 votes as an independent candidate within the Regionalists and Independents list.

In the elections held on 15 and 16 May 2021, he ran as a candidate for the Constitutional Convention through the reserved seats for Indigenous peoples, representing the Chango people across the regions of Antofagasta, Atacama, Coquimbo, and Valparaíso. He obtained 395 votes, corresponding to 43.41% of the valid votes cast.

During the Convention's regulatory phase, he served on the Commission on Indigenous Participation and Consultation. He later joined the Thematic Commission on Fundamental Rights and the Commission on Indigenous Peoples' Rights and Plurinationality.
