= Julio Álvarez Pinto =

Chilean politician

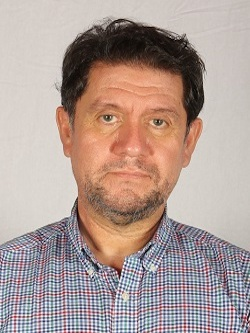

Member of the Constitutional Convention
- In office 4 July 2021 – 4 July 2022
- Constituency: 25th District

Personal details
- Born: 10 September 1964 (age 62) Recoleta, Chile
- Party: Socialist Party
- Education: Pontifical Catholic University of Chile (LL.B); Complutense University of Madrid (M.D)
- Profession: Lawyer

Julio Álvarez Pinto (born 10 September 1964) is a Chilean lawyer and politician affiliated with the Socialist Party (PS).

He served as a member of the Constitutional Convention representing the 26th District of the Los Lagos Region. He previously served as a municipal councillor of Castro during the periods 2008–2012 and 2016–2021.

== Biography ==
Álvarez Pinto was born on 10 September 1964 in Recoleta, Santiago Metropolitan Region. He is the son of Julio Mauricio Álvarez Vera and Hilda Lucinda Pinto Andrade. He is married to Carmen Gloria Vera Martínez and has four children.

He completed his secondary education at Colegio San Ignacio. He studied law at the Pontifical Catholic University of Chile, where he earned his law degree. He later completed a Master’s degree in Environmental Law and a Diploma in Advanced Studies at the Complutense University of Madrid. He is also a doctoral candidate in Labour Law at the same university.

Álvarez Pinto has worked as a lawyer in private practice, exercising his profession through his own legal practice.

== Political career ==
He is a member of the Socialist Party of Chile. He served as a councillor of the municipality of Castro for two non-consecutive terms, first from 2008 to 2012 and later from 2016 to 2021.

== Constitutional Convention ==
In the elections held on 15 and 16 May 2021, Álvarez Pinto ran as a candidate for the Constitutional Convention representing the 26th District of the Los Lagos Region as part of the Lista del Apruebo electoral pact.

He obtained 13,824 votes, corresponding to 10.53% of the valid votes cast, becoming the first majority candidate of the district and securing a seat in the convention.
