= Carolina Vilches =

Chilean constituent

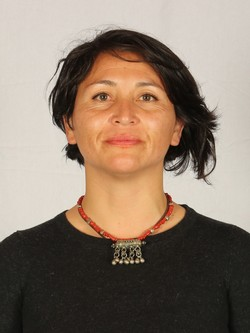

Member of the Constitutional Convention
- In office 4 July 2021 – 4 July 2022
- Constituency: 6th District

Personal details
- Born: 21 December 1984 (age 41) Vina del Mar, Chile
- Party: Commons
- Education: University of Playa Ancha
- Profession: Geographer

Carolina Vilches Fuenzalida (born 21 December 1984) is a Chilean geographer, hydrofeminist activist, and independent politician.

She served as a member of the Constitutional Convention, representing the 6th electoral district of the Valparaíso Region.

== Biography ==
Vilches was born on 21 December 1984 in Viña del Mar. She is the daughter of Omar Vilches Moraga and Mónica Fuenzalida Peña. She is married to José Sotelo Alfaro.

She completed her secondary education in 2002 at Instituto Superior de Comercio Alberto Blest Gana in Viña del Mar. She pursued higher education at the University of Playa Ancha in Valparaíso, qualifying as a geographer.

Professionally, she has worked at the Municipality of Petorca, Valparaíso Region, where she founded the Municipal Office for Water Affairs. She has also been noted for her work with local communities and collective spaces.

=== Political career ===
Vilches is an environmental and water-rights activist associated with the Movement for the Defense of Access to Water, Land, and Environmental Protection (MODATIMA) in Petorca.

She was a founder of the first Municipal Office for Water Affairs and of the Union of Rural Drinking Water Systems of the Petorca River Basin.

In the elections held on 15–16 May 2021, she ran as an independent candidate for the Constitutional Convention representing the 6th electoral district of the Valparaíso Region, on a Comunes party slot within the Apruebo Dignidad electoral pact, receiving 19,116 votes (5.82% of the validly cast votes).
