= Álvaro Jofré =

Chilean politician

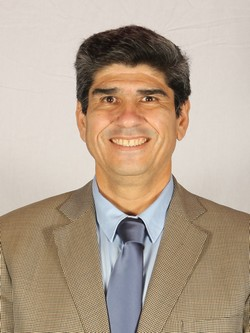

Member of the Chamber of Deputies
- Incumbent
- Assumed office 11 March 2026
- Preceded by: Renzo Trisotti
- Constituency: 2nd District

Member of the Constitutional Convention
- In office 4 July 2021 – 4 July 2022
- Constituency: 2nd District

Personal details
- Born: 16 October 1971 (age 54) Antofagasta, Chile
- Party: National Libertarian Party (since 2025)
- Other political affiliations: National Renewal (until 2025)
- Parent(s): Néstor Jofré; Hortensia Cáceres
- Occupation: Politician

Álvaro Arturo Jofré Cáceres (born 16 October 1971) is a Chilean politician who serves as a member of the Chamber of Deputies.

In 2025, he was elected as a member of the Chamber of Deputies for the 2nd district of the Tarapacá Region.

== Biography ==
He completed his secondary education at the Iquique English College (IEC), graduating in 1990 with a technical professional qualification. He later earned a degree in Business Administration Engineering.

He served as director of Radio Bravíssima in Iquique.

== Political career ==
He served as a municipal councillor of Iquique for the 2012–2016 term. The following year, he was elected as a Regional Councillor of the Tarapacá Region. In 2018, he was appointed Provincial Governor of Iquique Province.

In the 15–16 May 2021 Constitutional Convention election, he ran as a candidate for the 2nd district of the Tarapacá Region as a member of National Renewal, within the Vamos por Chile electoral pact. He obtained 6,131 votes, representing 7.79% of the valid votes cast.

During the drafting of the Convention’s internal regulations, he participated in the Provisional Commission on Decentralization, Equity and Territorial Justice. He later joined the Thematic Commission on Form of State, Territorial Organization, Autonomy, Decentralization, Equity, Territorial Justice, Local Governments and Fiscal Organization.

In the 2025 parliamentary election, he ran as a candidate for the 2nd district of the Tarapacá Region as a member of the National Libertarian Party, within the Change for Chile electoral pact. He was elected with 14,898 votes, representing 8.16% of the valid votes cast.
