= Nicolás Núñez Gangas =

Chilean politician

Nicolás Núñez
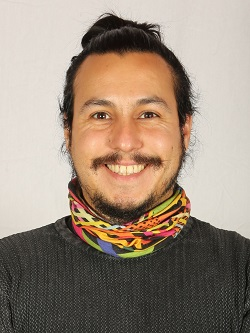

Member of the Constitutional Convention
- In office 4 July 2021 – 4 July 2022
- Constituency: 16th District

Personal details
- Born: 28 September 1987 (age 39) Chile
- Party: Social Green Regionalist Federation
- Education: University of Talca (LL.B)
- Occupation: Politician
- Profession: Lawyer

Nicolás Núñez Gangas (born 28 September 1987) is a Chilean lawyer and politician affiliated with the Regionalist Green Social Federation (FRVS).

He served as a member of the Constitutional Convention from 2021 to 2022, representing the 16th District of the Libertador General Bernardo O'Higgins Region.

== Biography ==
He was born in San Fernando, Chile, on 28 September 1987. He is the son of Guillermo Celestino Núñez Müller and Jessica Ester Gangas Astorga.

He completed his secondary education at Liceo Santa Cruz, in the commune of Santa Cruz, graduating in 2005. In 2006, he entered the University of Talca to study law and was admitted to the bar on 8 January 2015.

Professionally, Núñez has practiced law in the city of San Fernando and is a member of the legal group Aboga&Cía. He has also worked as a legislative advisor.

== Political career ==
Núñez is a member of the Regionalist Green Social Federation.

In the elections held on 15–16 May 2021, he ran as a candidate for the Constitutional Convention representing the 16th District of the Libertador General Bernardo O'Higgins Region, as part of the Apruebo Dignidad pact.

He was elected with 10,771 votes, corresponding to 7.59% of the valid votes cast.
