= Angélica Tepper =

Chilean lawyer (born 1961)

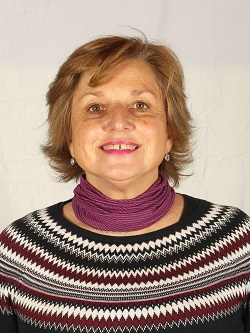

Member of the Constitutional Convention
- In office 4 July 2021 – 4 July 2022
- Constituency: 23rd District

Personal details
- Born: 23 March 1961 (age 65) Temuco, Chile
- Profession: Entrepreneur

María Angélica Tepper Kolossa (born 23 March 1961) is a Chilean businesswoman and independent politician.

She was elected as a member of the Constitutional Convention in 2021, representing the 23rd District of the Araucanía Region.

== Early life and family ==
Tepper was born on 23 March 1961 in Temuco, Chile. She is the daughter of Ronald Ernesto Tepper Álvarez and Ella Irma Carmen Kolossa Perlwitz.

She is married and has two children.

== Professional career ==
Tepper has more than 30 years of experience in the tourism sector in the Araucanía Region. She has been actively involved in the Hotel, Gastronomy and Tourism Trade Association (HOTELGA), where she served as president and led several initiatives related to regional tourism development.

She is a founding member of the Ruta Huellas de Pablo Neruda Temuco–Chile Corporation. She is also a founding partner of Hotel Bayern in Temuco and a co-founder of the Nevados de Sollipulli Lodge in Melipeuco.

== Political career ==
Tepper is an independent politician, politically close to National Renewal (RN). She served as president of the Multigremial de La Araucanía.

In the elections held on 15–16 May 2021, Tepper ran as a candidate for the Constitutional Convention representing the 23rd District of the Araucanía Region as part of the Vamos por Chile electoral pact. She obtained 4,888 votes, corresponding to 3.0% of the valid votes cast, and was elected as a member of the Convention.
