= Tammy Pustilnick =

Chilean scholar

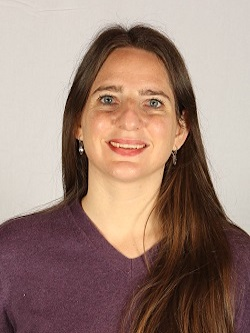

Member of the Constitutional Convention
- In office 4 July 2021 – 4 June 2022
- Constituency: 20th District

Personal details
- Born: 20 September 1986 (age 40) Santiago, Chile
- Party: Non-Neutral Independents
- Education: University of Chile (LL.B); New York University (LL.M); Tel Aviv University (M.D.)
- Profession: Lawyer

Tammy Pustilnick Arditi (born 28 November 1986) is a Chilean lawyer, gender equality consultant, and independent politician.

She served as a member of the Constitutional Convention between 2021 and 2022, representing the 20th District of the Biobío Region, and coordinated the convention's Harmonization Commission.

== Early life and education ==
Pustilnick was born on 28 November 1986 in Santiago, Chile. She is the daughter of Ricardo Pustilnick Paradiz and Mariana Arditi Grunberg. She is married to Asher Permuth Suárez.

She completed her secondary education at the Instituto Hebreo Dr. Chaim Weizmann in Santiago, graduating in 2004. She studied law at the University of Chile, where she earned a degree in Legal and Social Sciences. Her undergraduate thesis was titled Nueva ley de matrimonio civil: ¿y su armonía internacional? (2011). She was admitted to the Chilean Bar by the Supreme Court on 4 May 2012.

She later obtained a Master of Laws (LL.M) degree from New York University through the Becas Chile scholarship program, and a master's degree in Human Rights from Tel Aviv University.

== Professional career ==
Pustilnick has worked as a legal advisor for organizations focused on the defense of women's rights and sexual diversity. Since 2016, she has participated as a pro bono lawyer and activist at Fundación Iguales, advocating for the rights of the LGBTIQ+ community.

In 2017, she co-founded the organization Corporación Descentralizada, which promotes women's economic autonomy and leadership from a gender perspective. In 2020, she served as a consultant for UN Women in the Biobío Region, working on the promotion of gender equality best practices within companies.

She also worked in the United States with the non-governmental organization Sylvia Rivera Law Project.

== Political career ==
Pustilnick is an independent politician. In 2018, she was recognized as one of the 100 Leading Women in Chile by El Mercurio newspaper.

In the elections held on 15–16 May 2021, she ran as an independent candidate for the Constitutional Convention representing the 20th District of the Biobío Region, as part of the Independientes del Biobío por una Nueva Constitución list. She was elected with 10,350 votes, corresponding to 3.39% of the valid votes cast.

During her tenure in the convention, she served as coordinator of the Harmonization Commission.
