= Claudio Gómez =

Chilean lawyer and politician (born 1980)

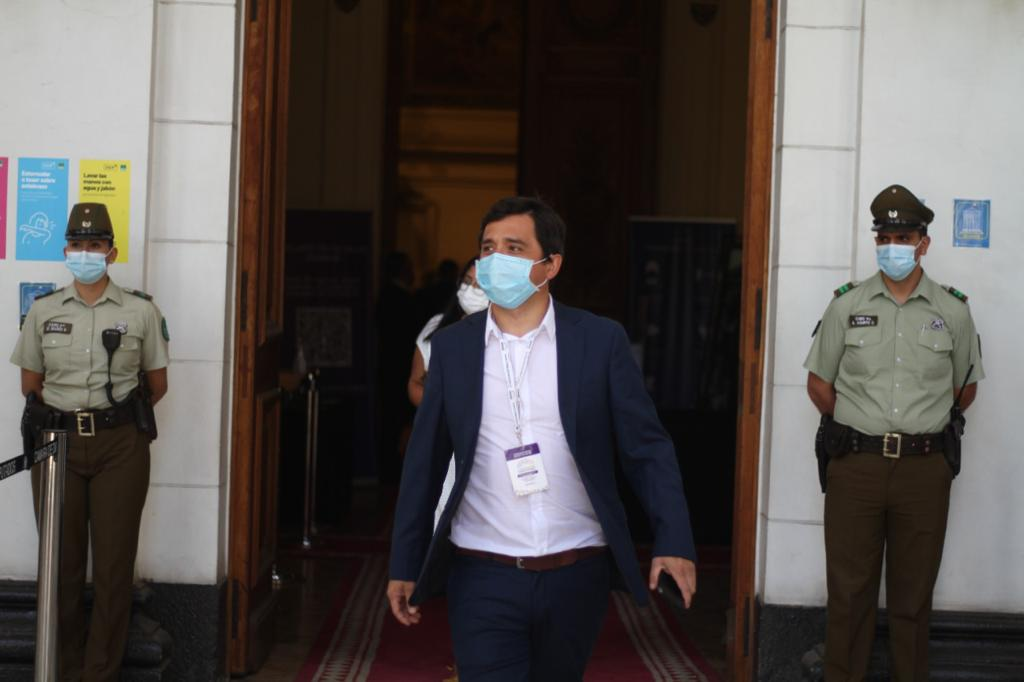

Member of the Constitutional Convention
- In office 4 July 2021 – 4 July 2022

Personal details
- Born: 6 April 1980 (age 45) San Felipe, Chile
- Education: Central University of Chile (LL.B); University of the Basque Country (LL.M)
- Occupation: Lawyer, professor

Claudio Gómez Castro (born 6 April 1980) is a Chilean lawyer, academic, and independent politician.

He served as a member of the Constitutional Convention from 2021 to 2022, representing the 6th District of the Valparaíso Region, and coordinated the commission on State Structure, Territorial Organization, Autonomy, Decentralization, Territorial Equity, Local Governments, and Fiscal Organization.

== Biography ==
Gómez was born on 6 April 1980 in San Felipe, Valparaíso Region, Chile. He is the son of Osvaldo Gómez Oliva and María Castro Ramírez. He is the father of three children.

He studied law at the Faculty of Legal and Social Sciences of the Central University of Chile, graduating in 2007. His undergraduate thesis was titled “Special procedures in the new Chilean labor process. Laws 20,022, 20,023 and 20,087”.

He was admitted to the Chilean Bar by the Supreme Court on 6 May 2011.

He holds a Master’s degree in Democratic Society, State, and Law from the University of the Basque Country, Spain.

Gómez has worked in private legal practice and has served as a professor of Political and Municipal Law at the School of Law of the University of Aconcagua since 2010. He has been the director of the School of Law at that institution since 2012.

== Political and public activity ==
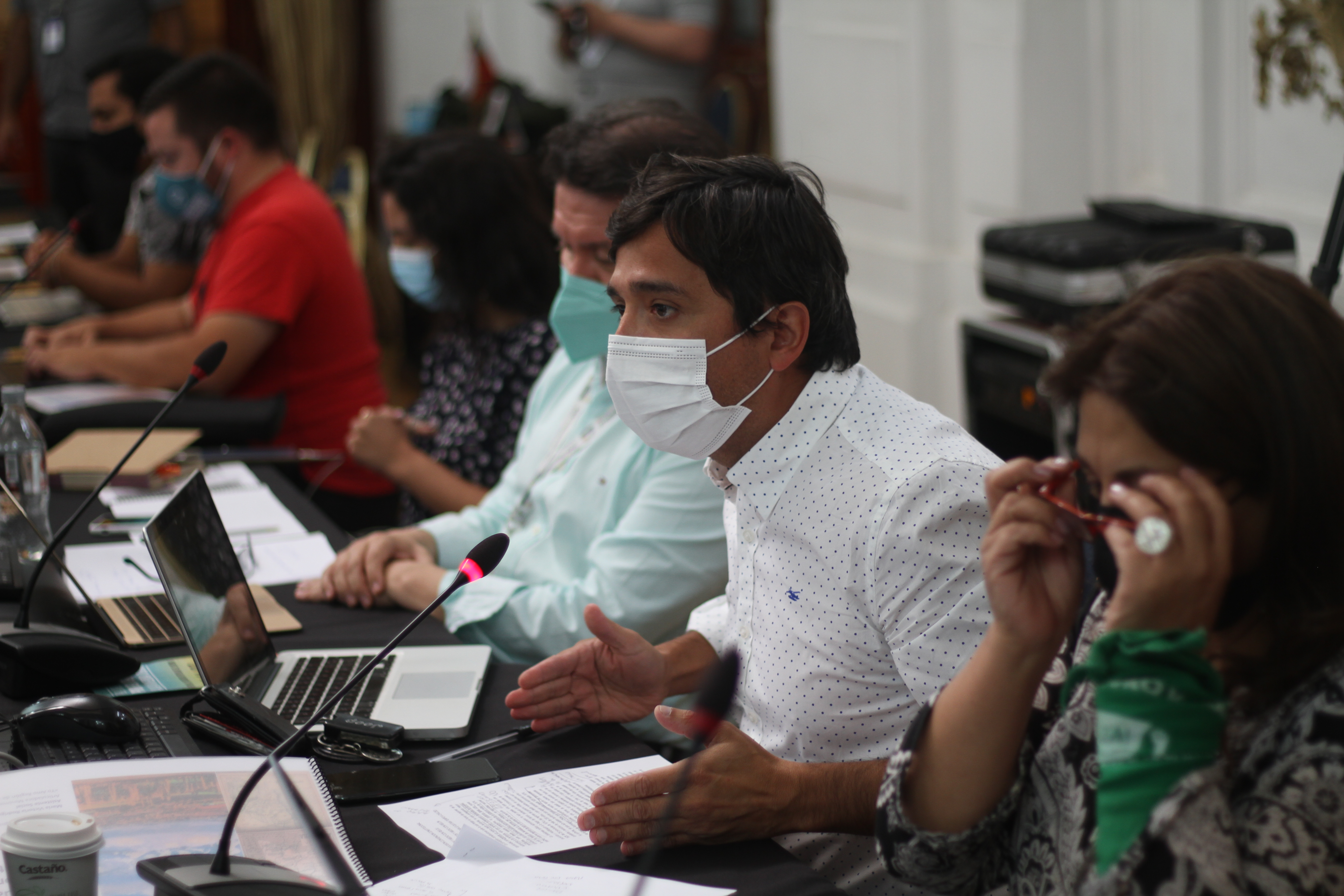
Gómez in the Constitutional Convention.

His public work has focused on advocacy for the creation of the Aconcagua Region, through the Corporación Aconcagua Región, where he has served as secretary general.

In the elections held on 15–16 May 2021, Gómez ran as an independent candidate for the Constitutional Convention representing the 6th District of the Valparaíso Region, running in a Socialist Party slot within the Lista del Apruebo. He was elected with 8,209 votes, corresponding to 2.50% of the valid votes cast.

During his tenure in the Convention, he served as coordinator of the commission on State Structure, Territorial Organization, Autonomy, Decentralization, Territorial Equity, Justice, Local Governments, and Fiscal Organization.
