= Paulina Valenzuela =

Chilean constituent

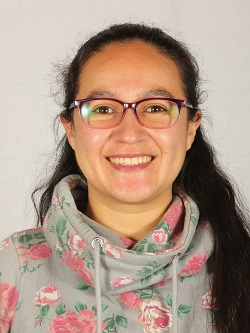

Member of the Constitutional Convention
- In office 4 July 2021 – 4 July 2022
- Constituency: 14th District

Personal details
- Born: 23 November 1984 (age 41) Santiago, Chile
- Party: Non-Neutral Independents (2020−2022)
- Education: Metropolitan University of Educational Sciences (Lic.); Cardinal Silva Henríquez Catholic University (M.D.)
- Profession: Teacher

Paulina Valenzuela Río (born 23 November 1984) is a Chilean primary education teacher and independent politician.

She served as a member of the Constitutional Convention, representing the 14th electoral district of the Santiago Metropolitan Region, and acted as coordinator of the Committee on Popular Participation.

== Biography ==
Valenzuela was born on 23 November 1984. She is the daughter of Jacinto Antonio Valenzuela Valenzuela and Verónica Socorro Río Osores.

She completed her primary and secondary education at Complejo Educacional San Alfonso in the commune of Puente Alto, graduating in 2002. She studied Primary Education Teaching at the Metropolitan University of Educational Sciences (UMCE) between 2003 and 2007, qualifying as a general basic education teacher.

Between 2014 and 2015, she completed a postgraduate specialization in Mathematics for early primary education teachers at the Cardinal Raúl Silva Henríquez Catholic University.

She has worked for seven years in municipal education in the commune of Paine, teaching at Escuela Francisco Letelier Valdés in Rangue and at Liceo Bárbara Kast Rist. She also participates as an instructor in the School Colonies program.

=== Political career ===
Valenzuela was a member of the Non-Neutral Independents movement.

In the elections held on 15–16 May 2021, she ran as an independent candidate for the Constitutional Convention representing the 14th electoral district of the Metropolitan Region as part of the Independents for a New Constitution electoral pact, receiving 15,734 votes (5.19% of the validly cast votes).
