= Pedro Muñoz Leiva =

Chilean constituent

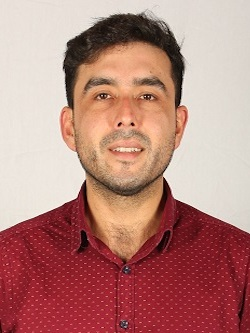

Member of the Constitutional Convention
- In office 4 July 2021 – 4 July 2022
- Constituency: 24th District

Personal details
- Born: 24 November 1987 (age 38) Loncoche, Chile
- Party: Socialist Party
- Education: Austral University of Chile (LL.B)
- Profession: Lawyer

Pedro Muñoz Leiva (born 24 November 1987) is a Chilean lawyer and socialist politician. He served as a member of the Constitutional Convention, representing the 24th electoral district of the Los Ríos Region.

He previously served as a municipal councillor of Valdivia from 2016 to 2020 and as deputy vice president of the Convention between 29 July 2021 and 6 January 2022.

== Biography ==
Muñoz was born on 24 November 1987. He is the son of Carlos Jorge Muñoz Garrido and Irene Hilda Leiva Silva. He is single.

He completed his secondary education at Liceo Padre Alberto Hurtado Cruchaga in Loncoche. He later studied law at the Austral University of Chile.

== Political career ==
Muñoz Leiva began his career in the Socialist Party. He began his political activity within the Student Federation of the Austral University of Chile (FEUACh) during 2008–2009.

He later focused on the defense of LGBTI rights, founding in 2010 the organization VALDIVERSA, the largest diversity advocacy organization in southern Chile, and serving as its first president. He subsequently became the first regional president of the Socialist Youth of the Los Ríos Region.

He served as a municipal councillor of Valdivia for the 2016–2020 term. In the elections held on 15–16 May 2021, he ran as a candidate for the 24th electoral district of the Los Ríos Region as part of the Lista del Apruebo electoral pact, receiving 11,173 votes (9.8% of the validly cast votes).

On 29 July 2021, in accordance with the regulations establishing deputy vice presidencies, he was confirmed as deputy vice president of the Constitutional Convention's governing board, a position he held until 6 January 2022.
