= Loreto Vidal =

Chilean politician

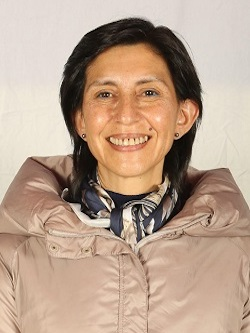

Member of the Constitutional Convention
- In office 4 July 2021 – 4 July 2022
- Constituency: 20th District

Personal details
- Born: 9 April 1970 (age 56) Valdivia, Chile
- Other political affiliations: The List of the People (2021)
- Education: University of Concepción (LL.B); University of Chile (LL.M)
- Profession: Lawyer

Rossana Vidal Hernández (born 9 April 1970) is a Chilean nurse, lawyer, academic, and independent politician.

She served as a member of the Constitutional Convention, representing the 20th electoral district of the Biobío Region.

== Biography ==
Vidal was born on 9 April 1970 in Valdivia. She is the daughter of Rolando Vidal Coronado and Adela Hernández Montencino. She is in a civil partnership with Patricia García Nazar.

She completed her secondary education in 1987 at Liceo Monseñor Guillermo Carlos Hartl in Pitrufquén. She later studied nursing and subsequently pursued law at the University of the Americas (UDLA), where she earned a degree in Legal and Social Sciences. She was admitted to the bar before the Supreme Court of Justice on 21 June 2013 and holds a Master’s degree in Bioethics.

Professionally, she has worked as a clinical nurse for more than seventeen years and is affiliated with the law firm Lexac Asociados. She has also served as a lecturer at the University of Concepción (UdeC), San Sebastián University (USS), and the UDLA.

=== Public career ===
In her public career, she has stood out for her work as executive director of the “Corporación Sempiterno”, an organization dedicated to working with vulnerable groups, particularly people experiencing homelessness.

In the elections held on 15–16 May 2021, she ran as an independent candidate for the Constitutional Convention representing the 20th electoral district of the Biobío Region as part of the La Lista del Pueblo electoral pact, receiving 11,496 votes (3.77% of the validly cast votes). She stated the coalition no longer represented the will of the Chilean people and that she wanted to maintain her independence.
