= Jeniffer Mella =

Chilean lawyer

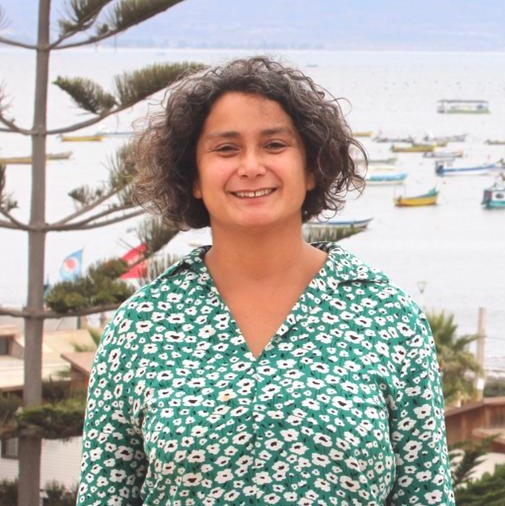

Member of the Constitutional Convention
- In office 4 July 2021 – 4 July 2022
- Constituency: 5th District

Personal details
- Born: 10 January 1980 (age 46) Santiago, Chile
- Education: University of Chile (LL.B)
- Profession: Lawyer

Jeniffer Mella Escobar (born 10 January 1981) is a Chilean lawyer, feminist activist, and independent politician. She served as a member of the Constitutional Convention between 2021 and 2022, representing the 5th District of the Coquimbo Region.

During her tenure, she coordinated the commission on State Structure, Territorial Organization, Autonomy, Decentralization, Territorial Equity, Local Governments, and Fiscal Organization, and also served as coordinator of Subcommission No. 1 on State Structure.

== Biography ==
Mella was born on 10 January 1981 in Santiago, Chile. She is the daughter of Osvaldo Mella Lorca and María Escobar Galaz.

She completed her secondary education at Colegio Inmaculada Concepción in San Fernando in 1998. In 1999, she entered the University of Chile, where she studied law and obtained a licentiate degree in Legal Sciences in 2011. She was admitted to the Chilean Bar by the Supreme Court on 25 April 2012.

She holds postgraduate diplomas in Human Rights and Women (2012) and in Family and Child Law (2019), both awarded by the University of Chile.

Mella has practiced law independently, providing legal advice to territorial advocacy collectives. She has worked as an official within the Chilean Judicial Branch and served at the Women's Center of San Bernardo.

== Political and activist activity ==
Her political activity began in 1997 as president of the student council at Colegio Inmaculada Concepción in San Fernando. During her university years, she participated in the Autonomous Students’ Movement at the University of Chile Law School.

Between 2003 and 2005, she participated in lesbian feminist self-managed projects, including Salón de las Preciosas and Trabajo y Estudios Lésbicos. She collaborated in the organization of La Otra Marcha in 2003, aimed at increasing the visibility of lesbians and transgender people. From 2005 to 2008, she was active in the Bloque Lésbico, and between 2008 and 2012 she participated in various lesbian coordination networks focused on territorial meetings and political advocacy. She has also been involved in the Fundación Género y Cultura of Ovalle.

In the elections held on 15–16 May 2021, Mella ran as an independent candidate for the Constitutional Convention representing the 5th District of the Coquimbo Region, as a representative of the Movimiento de Autoconvocados de Ovalle y del Limarí, within the Apruebo Dignidad pact, occupying a Convergencia Social party slot. She was elected with 13,368 votes, corresponding to 5.93% of the valid votes cast.

At the beginning of December 2022, she was appointed chief of staff to the Minister of Cultures, Arts and Heritage, Julieta Brodsky.
