= María Trinidad Castillo =

Chilean constituent

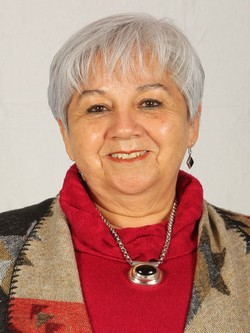

Member of the Constitutional Convention
- In office 4 July 2021 – 4 July 2022
- Constituency: 5th District

Personal details
- Born: 4 October 1956 (age 69) Coquimbo, Chile
- Education: University of La Serena (BA)
- Profession: Teacher

María Castillo Boilet (born 4 October 1956) is a Chilean biology teacher, trade union leader, and independent politician.

She served as a member of the Constitutional Convention from 2021 to 2022, representing the 5th District of the Coquimbo Region.

== Biography ==
Castillo was born on 4 October 1956 in El Palqui, a locality in the commune of Monte Patria, Ovalle, Chile. She is the daughter of Juan Castillo Jofré and Silvia Boilet Rodríguez. She is married to Víctor Alfaro Espinoza and is the mother of two children.

She completed her primary education at the El Palqui Primary School and at School No. 2 for Girls in Ovalle. She completed her secondary education at the Liceo de Niñas de Ovalle, now known as Liceo Estela Molina. She studied at the University of Chile, La Serena campus, where she qualified as a teacher with a specialization in Biology and Science in 1981.

Between 1994 and 1995, she completed a postgraduate diploma in Educational Administration and Supervision at the University of La Serena, and in 2008 earned a Master’s degree in Education with a specialization in Educational Management from the Autonomous University of Chile.

== Professional career ==
Castillo has worked both as a classroom teacher and in educational management roles. Between 1984 and 1993, she served as a biology teacher at the Municipal High School C-19 in Monte Patria. From 2001 to 2002, she was director of the CEPECH educational center in La Serena.

From 2003 to 2007, she worked as a monitor providing support for the children of seasonal workers at Escuela La Villa in Monte Patria.

She later worked as a technical advisor at Colegio Leonardo da Vinci in Coquimbo in 2011 and as head of technical education at Discovery School in Coquimbo between 2012 and 2013. Since 2010, she has also taught in health-related programs at INACAP Technological University and at the Central University of Chile.

== Political activity ==
In the elections held on 15–16 May 2021, Castillo ran as an independent candidate for the Constitutional Convention representing the 5th District of the Coquimbo Region, on the Independents for the Coquimbo Region list. She was elected with 6,080 votes, corresponding to 2.70% of the valid votes cast.
