= Janis Meneses =

Chilean constituent

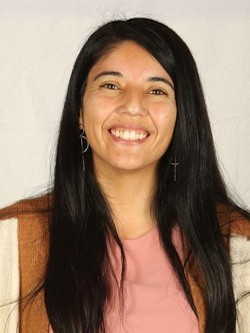

Member of the Constitutional Convention
- In office 4 July 2021 – 4 July 2022
- Constituency: 6th District

Personal details
- Born: 4 July 1989 (age 37) Quilpué, Chile
- Education: Pontifical Catholic University of Valparaíso (BA)
- Occupation: Constituent
- Profession: Social work

Janis Meneses Palma (born 4 July 1989) is a Chilean social worker, feminist and independent politician. She served as a member of the Constitutional Convention, representing the 6th District of the Valparaíso Region.

She coordinated the Fundamental Rights Commission and Subcommission No. 3.

== Biography ==
She was born on 4 July 1989 in Quilpué, Valparaíso Region. She is the daughter of Carlos Meneses Meneses and Enriqueta Palma Canelo.

== Professional career ==
She completed her primary education at Escuela Cirujano Videla in Valparaíso and her secondary education at Liceo Eduardo de la Barra, graduating in 2007. In 2008, she entered the Pontifical Catholic University of Valparaíso, where she earned a degree in Social Work.

Professionally, she worked as a social educator in the Programa Interviene Breve in 2012. She later served as a social worker at the Servicio Paz y Justicia (SERPAJ) between 2013 and 2014, at the Aldea de Niños Cardenal Raúl Silva Enríquez in 2014, in the Programa de Prevención Focalizada TarinaKuy from 2014 to 2016, and from 2016 onward at Escuela Quebrada Alvarado.

== Political activity ==
Meneses has been active in grassroots political work with women in labor unions and in the Los Pinos Neighborhood Assembly of Quilpué, where she served as a spokesperson.

In the elections held on 15–16 May 2021, she ran as an independent candidate for the Constitutional Convention representing the 6th District of the Valparaíso Region, as part of the Movimientos Independientes list.

She obtained 8,689 votes, corresponding to 2.65% of the valid votes cast.
