= Javier Fuchslocher =

Chilean scholar

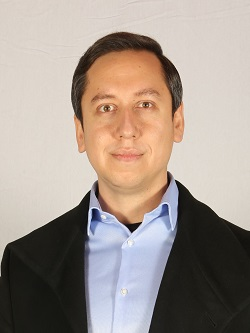

Member of the Constitutional Convention
- In office 4 July 2021 – 4 July 2022
- Constituency: 21st District

Personal details
- Born: 14 October 1988 (age 37) Santiago, Chile
- Party: Non-Neutral Independents
- Education: University of the Bío Bío (BA)
- Occupation: Constituent
- Profession: Teacher of History

Javier Fuchslocher Baeza (born 14 October 1988) is a Chilean history and geography teacher and independent politician.

He was elected as a member of the Constitutional Convention in 2021, representing the 21st District of the Biobío Region.

He served as coordinator of the Convention’s Committee on Popular Participation and Territorial Equity.

== Biography ==
Fuchslocher was born in Los Ángeles on 14 October 1988. He is the son of Javier Gonzalo Fuchslocher Carter and Odeth Maribel Baeza Marín. He is unmarried.

Fuchslocher completed his primary education at Escuela España in Los Ángeles and graduated from secondary school at Liceo de Hombres de Los Ángeles. He studied history and geography education at the University of the Bío-Bío, later obtaining a master’s degree in education.

Since graduating in 2013, he has worked as a teacher at Colegio Marta Brunet in the city of Los Ángeles.

== Political career ==
Fuchslocher is an independent politician and a member of the Independents Non-Neutral movement (Independientes No Neutrales). He has also been active as a trade union leader.

In the elections held on 15–16 May 2021, he ran as an independent candidate for the Constitutional Convention representing the 21st District of the Biobío Region, as part of the Independientes por una Nueva Constitución electoral pact. He obtained 5,952 votes, corresponding to 3.5% of the valid votes cast, and entered the Convention through the gender parity mechanism.

During the Convention’s work, he served as coordinator of the Committee on Popular Participation and Territorial Equity.
