= Lorena Céspedes =

Chilean scholar

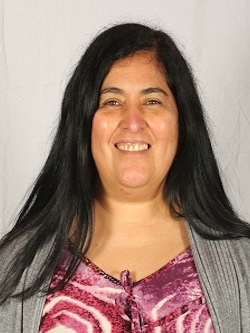

Member of the Constitutional Convention
- In office 4 July 2021 – 4 July 2022
- Constituency: 23rd District

Personal details
- Born: Temuco, Chile
- Party: Non-Neutral Independents
- Education: University of Chile (B.Sc)
- Occupation: Constituent
- Profession: Physics teacher

Lorena Céspedes Fernández (born 18 July 1973) is a Chilean physics teacher and independent politician. She served as a member of the Constitutional Convention, representing the 23rd electoral district of the Araucanía Region.

She served as deputy vice president of the Convention between 29 July 2021 and 6 January 2022 and acted as coordinator of the Committee on Constitutional Principles, Democracy, Nationality, and Citizenship.

== Biography ==
Céspedes Fernández was born on 18 July 1973. She is the daughter of Filadelfo Omar Céspedes Galleguillos and Silvia Graciela Fernández Opazo. She is married to Guillermo Venegas Middleton.

She completed her secondary education at Colegio Las Condes. She later studied physics and pedagogy at the University of Chile, obtaining a degree in Physics and a teaching qualification.

Since 1999, she has worked as a teacher in various institutions, promoting the development of science and technology in the Araucanía Region through teaching, educational events, and science-oriented initiatives.

== Political career ==
Céspedes Fernández is an independent politician and a member of the External Advisory Council of the Center for Public Policy at the Pontifical Catholic University of Chile. In 2018, she was one of the five finalists of the Global Teacher Prize Chile.

In the elections held on 15–16 May 2021, she ran as an independent candidate for the 23rd electoral district of the Araucanía Region as part of the Independents for a New Constitution electoral pact, receiving 5,546 votes (3.4% of the valid votes).

On 29 July 2021, she was confirmed as deputy vice president of the Constitutional Convention’s governing board, a position she held until 6 January 2022.
