= Manuel Woldarsky =

Chilean political activist

Manuel Woldarksy
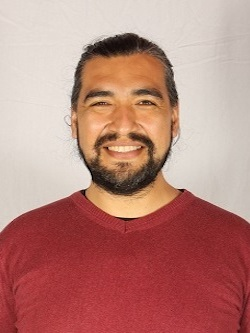

Member of the Constitutional Convention
- In office 4 July 2021 – 4 July 2022
- Constituency: 10th District

Personal details
- Born: 11 March 1984 (age 42) Santiago, Chile
- Other political affiliations: The List of the People (2021–2022)
- Education: Academy of Christian Humanism University (LL.B); Pontifical Catholic University of Chile (PgD)
- Profession: Lawyer

Manuel Woldarsky González (born 11 March 1984) is a Chilean lawyer and independent politician.

He served as a member of the Constitutional Convention, representing the 10th electoral district of the Metropolitan Region.

== Biography ==
Woldarsky was born on 11 March 1984 in Santiago. He is the son of Manuel Mauricio Woldarsky Arce and Jessica Eliana González Rocha.

He completed his secondary education at Liceo de Aplicación between 1999 and 2002. He pursued higher education at the Academy of Christian Humanism University, qualifying as a lawyer in 2016. In 2019, he completed a postgraduate diploma in Labour Law, with a specialization in Collective Labour Law and Negotiation, at the Pontifical Catholic University of Chile.

Woldarsky has worked in private legal practice, with experience in labour and family litigation. He has also served as a legal assistant at Buses Vule S.A., Prain Abogados Ltda., and CEVSA Soluciones Financieras.

== Political career ==
Woldarsky is an independent politician. He has participated in and collaborated with organizations dedicated to the defense of human rights, bicycle activism, culture, and workers' rights.

Specifically, he has been involved with the Human Rights Coordination of Providencia, the Chilean Commission of Human Rights, the Legal Defense Office of the University of Chile, and the bicycle activism organization “Ciclo Lumpen”. He is also a director of the Cultural Foundation Huentelauquén.

In the elections held on 15–16 May 2021, he ran as an independent candidate for the Constitutional Convention representing the 10th electoral district of the Metropolitan Region as part of the La Lista del Pueblo electoral pact, receiving 10,533 votes (2.48% of the validly cast votes).

In July 2022, he began working with the Communal Planning Secretariat (SECPLA) of Valparaíso, supporting the updating of information on social organizations, advising on the generation of territorially relevant information, and assisting in the updating of community-oriented plans within the framework of an integrated territorial planning program with a participatory and human rights approach.
