= Francisca Arauna =

Chilean constituent

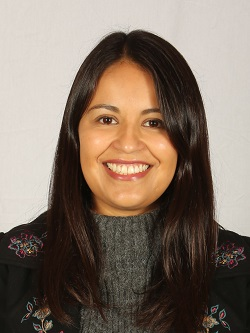

Member of the Constitutional Convention
- In office 4 July 2021 – 4 July 2022
- Constituency: 18th District

Personal details
- Born: 15 March 1991 (age 35) Parral, Chile
- Other political affiliations: The List of the People (2021–2022)
- Parent(s): Ricardo Arauna; Carmen Urrutia
- Education: Andrés Bello National University (LL.B); University of the Andes (LL.M)
- Profession: Lawyer

Francisca Arauna Urrutia (born 15 March 1991) is a Chilean lawyer and independent politician.

She served as a member of the Constitutional Convention, representing the 18th District of the Maule Region.

== Biography ==
Arauna Urrutia was born on 15 March 1991 in Parral, Maule Region. She is the daughter of Ricardo Patricio Arauna Ponce and Carmen Gloria Urrutia Jorquera.

She completed her primary and secondary education at Colegio San José in Parral. She studied law at Andrés Bello National University from 2009 to 2015. In 2020, she obtained a postgraduate diploma in Commercial Companies and Business Law from the University of the Andes, Chile.

She has practiced law independently, working as a legal adviser for companies such as Lácteos Talagante, Amasplus, and Gestión Didáctica, and as a partner lawyer at the firm AOYCIA.

She was one of the founders of the digital platform Derecho Fácil, aimed at making legal knowledge more accessible to the public, through which she has developed a significant social media presence.

== Political career ==
In the elections held on 15 and 16 May 2021, she ran as an independent candidate for the Constitutional Convention representing the 18th District of the Maule Region, as part of La Lista del Pueblo.

She received 11,776 votes, equivalent to 10.6% of the valid votes cast, and was elected as a constitutional delegate.
