= 2021 Chilean municipal elections =

- 15–16 May 2021

345 municipalities
- Registered: 14,900,190
- Turnout: 42.98%
- Votes counted: 99.94% as of 17 May 2021, 21:00 CLT
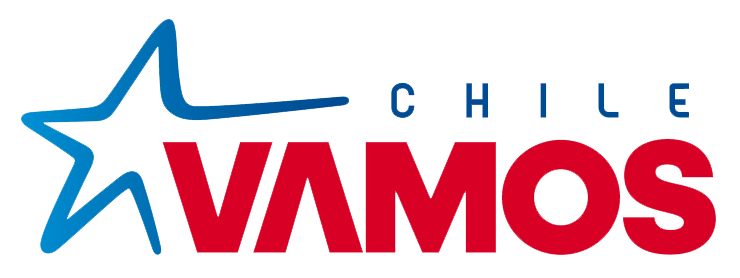

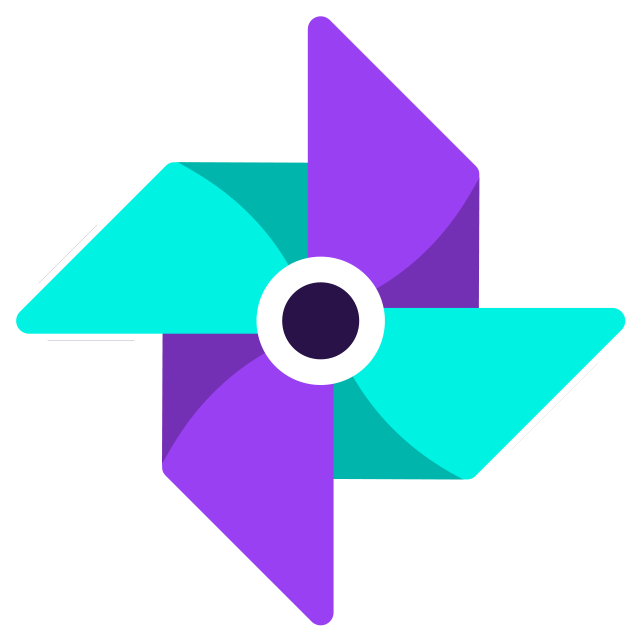

	First party	Second party	Third party
Party	Chile Vamos ▻: RN; UDI; Evópoli; PRI	Constituent Unity ▻: Socialist; PPD; Radical; Christian Dem.; Progressive; Citizens	Broad Front ▻: RD; CS; Commons; Liberal
Last election	146 seats, 38.5%	139 seats, 36.4%	1 seats, 0.7%
Seats won	88	128	12
Seat change	▼58	▼11	▲11
Popular vote	1,649,577	1,513,608	494,437
Percentage	26.0%	23.9%	7.8%
Swing	▼12.5% pp	▼12.6% pp	▲7.1% pp
	Fourth party	Fifth party	Sixth party
Party	Chile Digno ▻: Communist; FRVS	Dignity Now ▻: Humanist; Equality	Independents
Last election	3 seats, 1.9%	0 seats, 1.2%	52 seats, 17.4%
Seats won	9	3	105
Seat change	▲6	▲3	▲53
Popular vote	419,840	214,035	1,811,838
Percentage	6.6%	3.4%	28.6%
Swing	▲4.7% pp	▲2.2% pp	▲11.2% pp

Municipal elections were held in Chile on 15 and 16 May 2021, in conjunction with elections of members for the Constitutional Convention and regional governors. The process included the direct election of mayors and the members of the council of 345 municipalities administering 346 communes, (Note: The commune of Antártica is administered by the municipality of Cabo de Hornos.) the smallest administrative division of the country. The elected mayors and members of the Municipal Council took office on June 28, 2021, serving an extraordinary term of 3 years, 5 months and 8 days (until December 6, 2024) .

These elections were originally scheduled for 25 October 2020, but the COVID-19 pandemic changed the entire election schedule in Chile, moving the 2020 national plebiscite from 26 April to 25 October. The municipal elections were moved then to 11 April 2021, extending the term of the mayors elected in the previous election. Due to the pandemic, the municipal elections (and the concurring other elections) were extended to two days (10 and 11 April) to avoid agglomerations, becoming the first election in Chile to be held in more than one day. Finally, the elections were again postponed to 15 and 16 May 2021 due to a rise in the cases of COVID-19.

== Mayors' elections results ==
=== Main communes ===
List of elected mayors in the 16 regional capitals and the communes with more than 150,000 inhabitants.

Region	Commune	Previous mayor	Elected mayor	Result
AYP	Arica	Gerardo Espíndola (PL)	Gerardo Espíndola (PL)	Incumbent re-elected
TAR	Iquique	Mauricio Soria (Ind.-PPD)	Mauricio Soria (Ind.-PPD)	Incumbent re-elected
ANT	Antofagasta	Karen Rojo (Ind.) (Note: Mayor elected in previous election couldn't run due to criminal charges.)	Jonathan Velásquez (Ind.)	
ANT	Calama	Daniel Agusto (RN)	Eliecer Chamorro (FREVS)	Incumbent defeated
ATA	Copiapó	Marcos López (Ind.-PS)	Marcos López (Ind.-PS)	Incumbent re-elected
COQ	La Serena	Roberto Jacob (PR)	Roberto Jacob (PR)	Incumbent re-elected
COQ	Coquimbo	Marcelo Pereira (Ind.-PDC)	Alí Manouchehri (Ind.)	Incumbent defeated
VAL	Valparaíso	Jorge Sharp (Ind.)	Jorge Sharp (Ind.)	Incumbent re-elected
VAL	Viña del Mar	Virginia Reginato (UDI) (Note: Mayor elected in previous election couldn't run due to re-election limit.)	Macarena Ripamonti (RD)	Swing
VAL	Quilpué	Mauricio Viñambres (PS)	Valeria Melipillán (CS)	Swing
RMS	Santiago	Felipe Alessandri (RN)	Irací Hassler (PC)	Incumbent defeated
RMS	Puente Alto	Germán Codina (RN)	Germán Codina (RN)	Incumbent re-elected
RMS	Maipú	Cathy Barriga (Ind.-UDI)	Tomás Vodanovic (RD)	Incumbent defeated
RMS	La Florida	Rodolfo Carter (Ind.)	Rodolfo Carter (Ind.)	Incumbent re-elected
RMS	San Bernardo	Leonel Cádiz Soto (PS)	Christopher White (PS)	Coalition hold
RMS	Las Condes	Joaquín Lavín (UDI) (Note: Mayor elected in previous election decided not to run for re-election.)	Daniela Peñaloza (UDI)	Coalition hold
RMS	Peñalolén	Carolina Leitao (PDC)	Carolina Leitao (PDC)	Incumbent re-elected
RMS	Quilicura	Juan Carrasco (Ind.)	Paulina Bobadilla (Ind.)	Swing
RMS	Pudahuel	Johnny Carrasco (PS)	Ítalo Bravo (PI)	Swing
RMS	Ñuñoa	Andrés Zarhi (Ind.-RN)	Emilia Ríos (RD)	Swing
RMS	Estación Central	Rodrigo Delgado (UDI)	Felipe Muñoz (Ind.)	Swing
RMS	Recoleta	Daniel Jadue (PC)	Daniel Jadue (PC)	Incumbent re-elected
RMS	La Pintana	Claudia Pizarro (PDC)	Claudia Pizarro (PDC)	Incumbent re-elected
RMS	Colina	Mario Olavarría (UDI)	Isabel Valenzuela (UDI)	Coalition hold
RMS	El Bosque	Sadi Melo (PS)	Manuel Zúñiga (PS)	Coalition hold
RMS	Renca	Claudio Castro (PDC)	Claudio Castro (Ind.)	Incumbent re-elected
RMS	Providencia	Evelyn Matthei (UDI)	Evelyn Matthei (UDI)	Incumbent re-elected
OHI	Rancagua	Eduardo Soto (Ind.-UDI)	Juan Ramón Godoy (PS)	Swing
MAU	Talca	Juan Carlos Díaz (RN)	Juan Carlos Díaz (RN)	Incumbent re-elected
MAU	Curicó	Javier Muñoz (PDC)	Javier Muñoz (PDC)	Incumbent re-elected
ÑUB	Chillán	Sergio Zarzar (RN)	Camilo Benavente (PPD)	Swing
BIO	Concepción	Álvaro Ortiz (PDC)	Álvaro Ortiz (PDC)	Incumbent re-elected
BIO	Los Ángeles	Esteban Krause (PR)	Esteban Krause (PR)	Incumbent re-elected
BIO	Talcahuano	Henry Campos (UDI)	Henry Campos (UDI)	Incumbent re-elected
ARA	Temuco	Miguel Becker (RN)	Roberto Neira (PPD)	Swing
LRS	Valdivia	Omar Sabat (Ind.-UDI)	Carla Amtmann (RD)	Incumbent defeated
LLA	Puerto Montt	Gervoy Paredes (PS)	Gervoy Paredes (PS)	Incumbent re-elected
LLA	Osorno	Jaime Bertín (PDC)	Emeterio Carrillo (PDC)	Coalition hold
AYS	Coyhaique	Alejandro Huala (PS)	Carlos Gatica (PDC)	Coalition hold
MAG	Punta Arenas	Claudio Radonich (RN)	Claudio Radonich (RN)	Incumbent re-elected

Source: SERVEL (99.94% counted)

=== Results by alliances ===
Party	Votes	%	+/–	Seats	+/–
Chile Vamos	1,649,577	26.02	–12.5	88	–58
Constituent Unity (Note: Includes both lists: Unity for the Approve (PS-PPD-PR): 1,513,608 votes, 68 elected mayors.; Unity for Dignity (PDC-PRO): 836,001 votes, 60 elected mayors.)	1,513,608	23.88	–12.6	128	–11
Broad Front	494,437	7.80	+7.1	12	+11
Chile Digno, Verde y Soberano	419,840	6.62	+4.7	9	+6
Dignity Now (PH-PI)	214,035	3.38	+2.2	3	+3
Ecologists and Independents	127,931	2.02	+0.4	0	–2
Republicans	83,011	1.31	New	0	New
Patriotic Union	17,898	0.28	0.0	0	0
Independent Citizens	3,415	0.05	New	0	New
New Time	2,849	0.04	New	0	New
Independent Christians	646	0.01	New	0	New
Independents	1,811,838	28.58	+11.2	105	+53
Total	6,339,085	100.00	–	345	–
Valid votes	6,339,085	98.03			
Invalid votes	70,707	1.09			
Blank votes	56,426	0.87			
Total votes	6,466,218	100.00			
Registered voters/turnout	14,900,190	43.40			
Source: SERVEL (99.94% counted)

=== Results by parties ===
Alliance/Pact	List	Party	Votes	%	+/–	Seats	+/–
Chile Vamos		National Renewal (RN)	515,269	8.13	-4.52	32	-15
Chile Vamos		Independent Democrat Union (UDI)	505,288	7.98	-6.81	32	-21
Chile Vamos		Political Evolution (Evópoli)	58,730	0.93	+0.93	1	+1
Chile Vamos		Democratic Independent Regionalist Party (PRI)	8,093	0.13	-0.13	0	-1
Chile Vamos		Independents	560,116	8.84	-1.96	23	-22
Constituent Unity	Unity for the Approve	Socialist Party of Chile (PS)	317,331	5.01	-2.97	22	-3
Constituent Unity	Unity for the Approve	Party for Democracy (PPD)	238,151	3.76	-1.94	17	-9
Constituent Unity	Unity for the Approve	Radical Party of Chile (PR)	127,768	2.02	-1.08	11	+2
Constituent Unity	Unity for the Approve	Independents	152,750	2.41	-2.42	18	-3
Constituent Unity	Unity for Dignity	Independents	78,630	1.24	-2.42	12	-3
Constituent Unity	Unity for Dignity	Christian Democratic Party (PDC)	576,028	9.09	-2.72	46	3
Constituent Unity	Unity for Dignity	Citizens (CIU)	15,156	0.24	New	0	New
Constituent Unity	Unity for Dignity	Progressive Party (PRO)	6,852	0.11	-1.66	2	-1
Broad Front		Democratic Revolution (RD)	261,199	4.12	+3.87	6	+6
Broad Front		Social Convergence (CS)	53,953	0.85	New	2	New
Broad Front		Commons	42,049	0.66	+0.58	0	0
Broad Front		Liberal Party of Chile (PL)	20,991	0.33	+0.09	1	0
Broad Front		Independents	11,5631	1.83	+1.67	3	+3
Chile Digno, Verde y Soberano		Communist Party of Chile (PCCh)	330,296	5.21	+3.58	6	+3
Chile Digno, Verde y Soberano		Social Green Regionalist Federation (FREVS)	25,210	0.40	+0.10	1	+1
Chile Digno, Verde y Soberano		Independents	63,472	1.00	+1.00	2	+2
Dignity Now		Equality Party (PI)	99,102	1.56	+1.18	1	+1
Dignity Now		Humanist Party (PH)	51,243	0.81	+0.54	2	+2
Dignity Now		Independents	63,498	1.00	+0.44	0	0
Ecologist and Independents		Green Ecologist Party (PEV)	45,539	0.72	+0.03	0	-1
Ecologist and Independents		Independents	82,187	1.30	+0.36	0	-1
Republicans		Republican Party (PLR)	58,701	0.93	New	0	New
Republicans		Independents	24,310	0.38	New	0	New
Patriotic Union		Patriotic Union (UPA)	17,885	0.28	-0.03	0	0
Independent Citizens		National Citizen Party (PNC)	850	0.01	New	0	New
Independent Citizens		Independents	2,565	0.04	New	0	New
New Time		New Time	2,849	0.04	New	0	New
Christian Citizens		Christian Conservative Party (PCC)	470	0.01	New	0	New
Christian Citizens		Independents	176	0.00	New	0	New
Independent candidates		Independent candidates	1,811,838	28.60	+11.24	105	+53
Total			6,334,177				
Valid votes			6,334,177	98.03			
Invalid votes			70,661	1.09			
Blank votes			56,399	0.87			
Total votes			6,461,237				
Source: SERVEL (99.89% counted)

== Councilors' elections results ==
=== Results by alliance ===
Party	Votes	%	+/–	Seats	+/–
Constituent Unity	2,036,497	33.45	–11.64	1,010	–144
Chile Vamos	1,828,214	30.03	–9.74	772	–150
Chile Digno, Verde y Soberano	761,619	12.51	+6.34	205	+107
Broad Front	557,309	9.15	+7.58	132	+122
Dignidad Ahora	312,727	5.14	+2.08	55	+35
Ecologists and Independents	252,823	4.15	+2.32	47	+33
Republican Party	188,542	3.10	New	12	New
Patriotic Union	29,354	0.48	+0.17	1	+1
Revolutionary Workers Party	13,505	0.22	New	1	New
Independent Citizens	7,655	0.13	New	1	New
Independent Christians	4,174	0.07	New	0	New
New Time	3,430	0.06	New	0	New
Independents	92,725	1.52	+0.69	16	+16
Total	6,088,574	100.00	–	2,252	–
Valid votes	6,088,574	94.24			
Invalid votes	177,551	2.75			
Blank votes	194,711	3.01			
Total votes	6,460,836	100.00			
Registered voters/turnout	14,900,190	43.36			
Source: SERVEL (100% counted)
