= 2021 Chilean Constitutional Convention election =

- 15–16 May 2021

155 seats in the Chilean Constitutional Convention
- Registered: 14,900,190
- Turnout: 43.43%
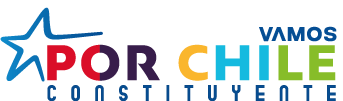

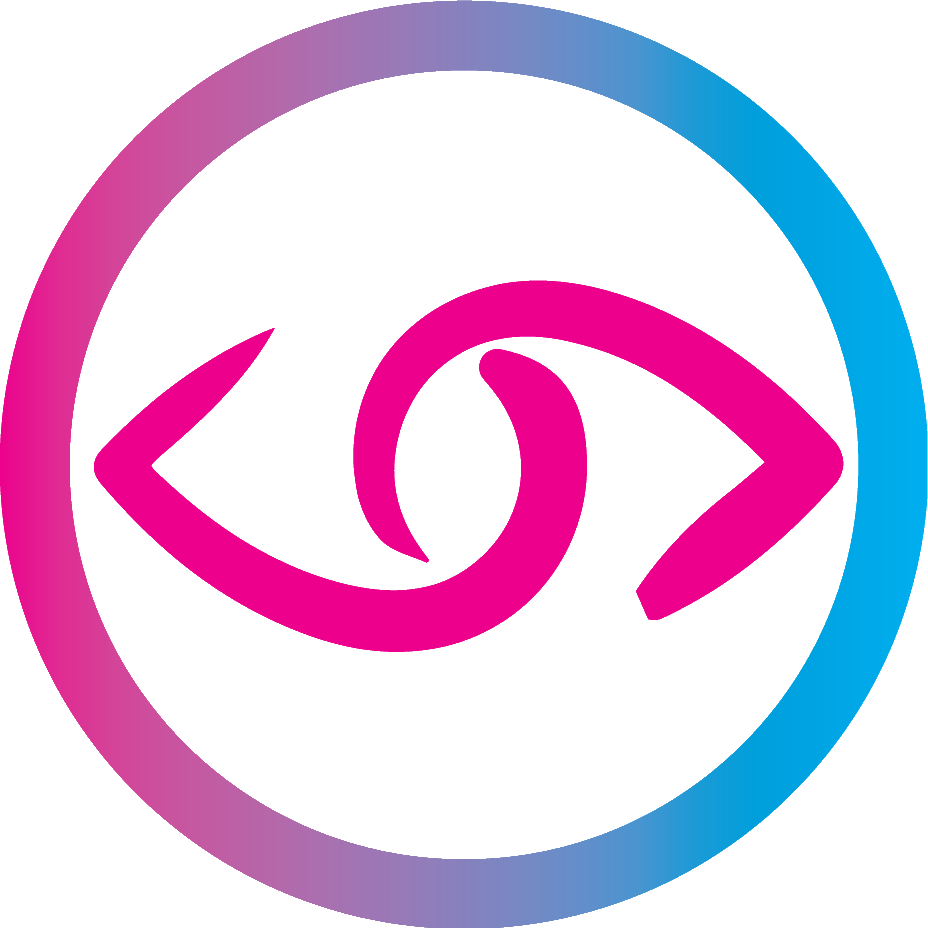

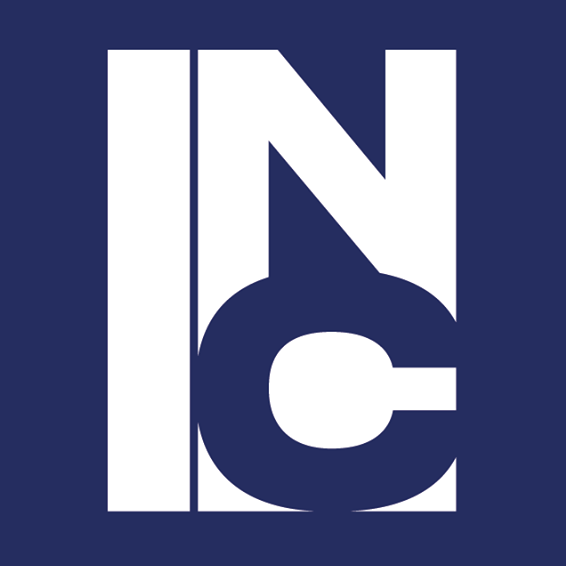

	First party	Second party	Third party
Party	Vamos por Chile ▻: RN; UDI; Evópoli; PRI; PLR	Apruebo Dignidad ▻: Communist; RD; CS; Commons; FRVS; IL; FC; Unir	The List of the People
Seats won	37	28	26
Popular vote	1,174,502	1,070,361	927,603
Percentage	20.6%	18.7%	16.2%
	Fourth party	Fifth party	Sixth party
Party	Lista del Apruebo ▻: Socialist; PPD; Radical; Christian Dem.; Progressive; Citizens; Liberal	Non-Neutral Independents	Independent candidates/lists
Seats won	25	11	11
Popular vote	825,397	473,194	884,295
Percentage	14.5%	8.3%	15.5%
- Results of the 2021 Chilean Constitutional Convention election.

An election for the members of the Constitutional Convention was held in Chile between 15 and 16 May 2021. This election was called after 78% of voters in the 2020 national plebiscite voted to write a new Constitution through this method.

After massive protests and riots sparked in October 2019, an agreement was reached on 15 November 2019 between several political parties to start the process to write a new Constitution. In case the first referendum was approved (originally scheduled for 26 April 2021), a special election would be called to select the members of the Constitutional Convention. This election was originally scheduled for 25 October 2020, six months after the first referendum. However, due to the impact of the COVID-19 pandemic in Chile, the first referendum was moved to 25 October and the eventual election of the members of the Convention was scheduled for 11 April 2021. The extension of the pandemic forced the government to change the date of the election twice later: in March 2021, the election was extended to two days (10 and 11 April) and later, it was postponed by one month to 15 and 16 May 2021 due to a rise in COVID-19 cases.

This was the first time that Chilean citizens were able to vote for the members of the body created to write the Constitution. Although based originally in the system to elect the 155 members of the Chamber of Deputies, this election process established several changes. For the first time, 17 reserved seats were established for the 10 official indigenous groups. Also, different mechanisms in the inscription of candidates and the election system itself were designed to ensure gender parity in the Convention, being the first assembly of this kind in the world with equal representation of men and women.

The election's results were considered a surprise and a complete rearrangement of the political system in Chile established since the end of Pinochet's dictatorship in 1990. A large share of elected members (65 out of 155) were independent candidates organized in new lists (26 from the anti-establishment People's List, 22 others and 17 indigenous representatives). Although Chile Vamos, the governing alliance, was the most voted list in the country, it represented the lowest results in Chilean modern history for right-wing politics, not even reaching the third of members needed to veto in the Convention. The successor to Concertación, the main centre-left alliance, finished in fourth place, being surpassed by the alliance made by the leftist Communist Party and the Broad Front. The List of the People, an anti-establishment list of independent candidates, finished in third place.

== Electoral system ==
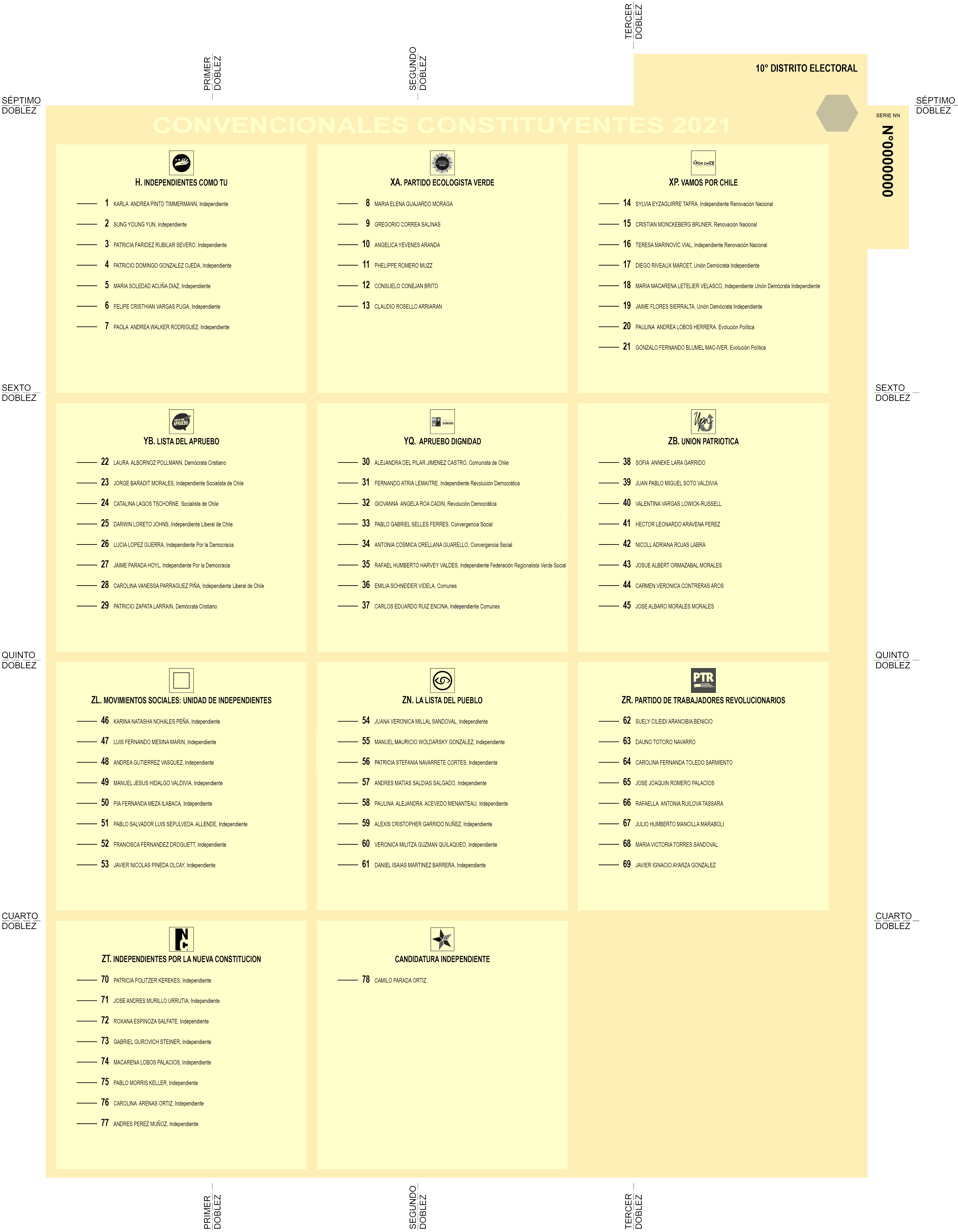
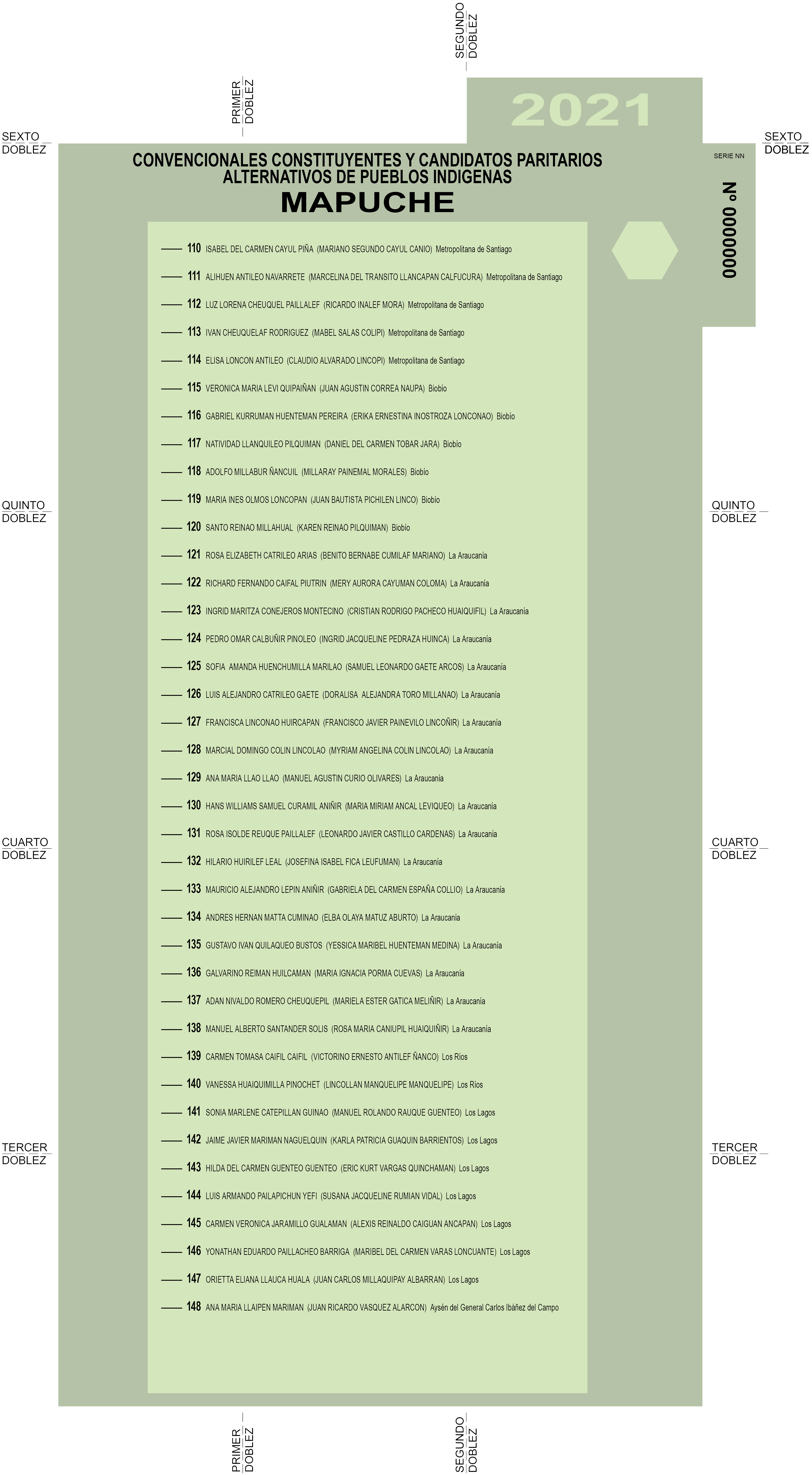
Ballots used for the Constitutional Convention election: beige ballot for at-large election in the 10th district (left) and green ballot for Mapuche reserved seats. (right).

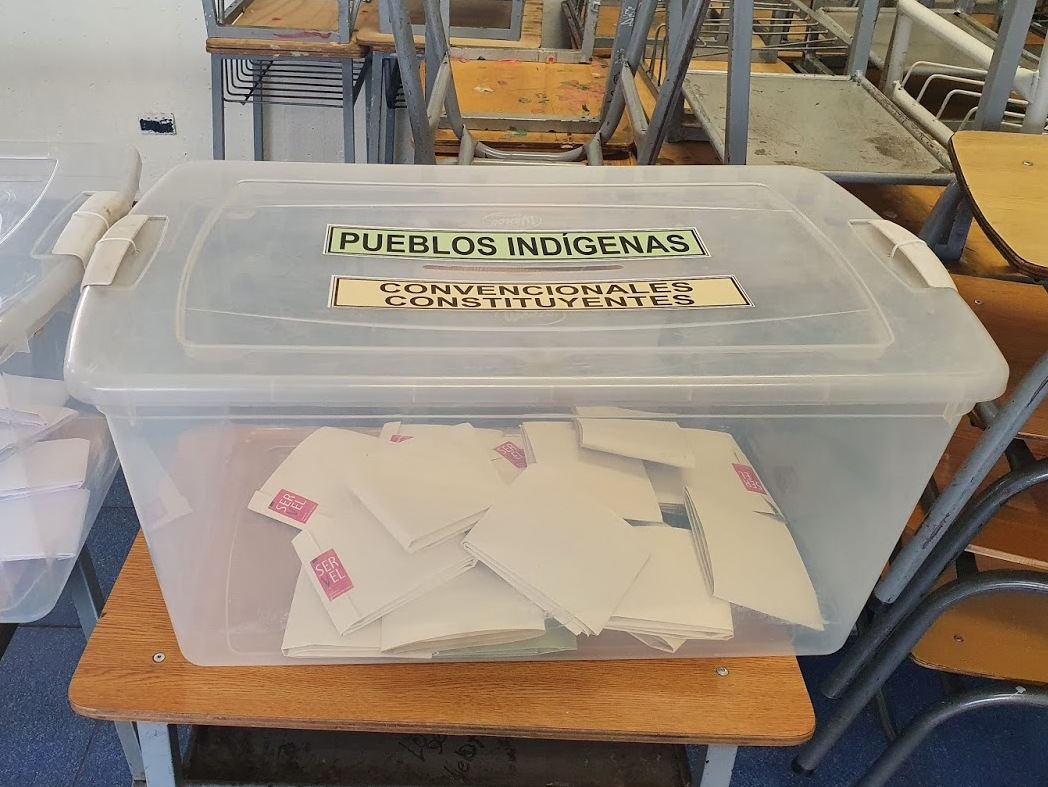
Ballot box used in the 2021 Constitutional Convention election.

The Constitutional Convention is composed of 155 members directly elected in this election: 138 by the electorate at large and 17 were reserved for citizens identified as indigenous.

The 138 at-large members were chosen in 28 constituencies of between three and eight seats by open list proportional representation. The constituencies are the same used for the election of the 155 members of the Chamber of Deputies. However, the districts with the largest number of indigenous people (according to the last census) and more than 3 seats were reduced by one seat to allocate the reserved indigenous seats. Candidates should be at least 18 years old and not have been previously convicted of a felony. Candidates could be presented by political parties or alliances of parties; in the case of independents candidates, they could participate as single independent candidates (gathering signatures of other independent citizens equal to 0.2% of voters in the last parliamentary election) or as a list (in this case, 0.5% of voters).

Seats were allocated using the D'Hondt method, just like in the parliamentary elections. In April 2020, a constitutional reform made some adjustments to that system to ensure equal representation of men and women in the Constitutional Convention. In case there is no gender equality in a constituency, (Note: For the election of members for the Constitutional Convention, it will be considered the criteria for gender parity is not met if: in the case of districts with an even number of seats, the number of elected members of one gender is larger than the other.; in the case of districts with an odd number of seats, when the difference in the number of elected members by gender is more than one.) the least-voted elected candidate of the over-represented gender will be replaced by a different-sex member in the same list or political party of the replaced candidate. Also, all alliances and parties had to present a list of candidates alternating their gender, starting with a woman, followed by a man, and so on.

The 17 seats reserved for Chilean indigenous peoples were allocated proportionally, depending on the number of people identifying in the 2017 census: 7 seats for Mapuche, (Note: Mapuche seats will be allocated in three different constituencies according to the place of residency of the candidates.) 2 for Aymara, and 1 each for the Diaguita, Quechua, Atacameño, Colla, Chango, Rapa Nui, Kawésqar, and Yaghan peoples. Originally, an additional seat was set for the Afro-Chilean tribal group, but the proposal didn't meet the quorum for approval in Congress. Candidates for these seats must have been registered as a member of one of the recognized indigenous groups with CONADI or have an affidavit declaring that, and have to live in one of the designated regions for each group. Citizens identifying as indigenous could choose one of the ballots: the beige for the at-large election or the green for the reserved seats (with different candidates depending on its group). The candidates with the largest number of votes will be elected and, in case there is no gender equality, the least-voted members of the over-represented gender will be replaced by their alternate candidate of the different gender.

Each list also had to present candidates with disabilities at least in 5% of their candidacies. Other proposals to allow more diversity in the Constituent Assembly were rejected, including one to secure 5% of the candidacies to people from gender or sexual minorities or to establish 3 electoral districts (with 8 seats) for Chileans living abroad.

=== Electoral districts ===
District number	Geographical area	Seats
1st district	Arica and Parinacota	3
2nd district	Tarapacá	3
3rd district	Antofagasta	4
4th district	Atacama	4
5th district	Coquimbo	6
6th district	Aconcagua, Quillota and Petorca	8
7th district	Valparaíso, San Antonio and Pacific Islands	7
8th district	Santiago West	7
9th district	Santiago North	6
10th district	Santiago Central	7
11th district	Santiago North East	6
12th district	Santiago South East	6
13th district	Santiago South	4
14th district	Santiago Outer	5
15th district	Cachapoal Valley	5
16th district	Colchagua Valley	4
17th district	Maule North	7
18th district	Maule South	4
19th district	Ñuble	5
20th district	Greater Concepción	7
21st district	Biobio and Arauco	4
22nd district	Araucanía North	3
23rd district	Araucanía South	6
24th district	Los Ríos	4
25th district	Osorno and Llanquihue Lake	3
26th district	Puerto Montt, Chiloé and Palena	4
27th district	Aysén	3
28th district	Magallanes and Chilean Antarctica	3
Seats for Chilean indigenous peoples (Note: Election was held nation-wide. However, candidates were restricted to certain regions depending on their residency and the indigenous group they represent.)		17
Mapuche	Coquimbo, Valparaíso, Santiago, O'Higgins and Maule	1
Mapuche	Ñuble, Biobío, La Araucanía	4
Mapuche	Los Ríos, Los Lagos and Aysén	2
Aymara	Arica and Parinacota, Tarapacá and Antofagasta	2
Diaguita	Atacama and Coquimbo	1
Quechua	Arica and Parinacota, Tarapacá and Antofagasta	1
Lickanantay	Antofagasta	1
Qulla/Colla	Atacama and Coquimbo	1
Chango	Antofagasta, Atacama, Coquimbo and Valparaíso	1
Rapa Nui	Easter Island	1
Kawésqar	Magallanes and Chilean Antarctica	1
Yaghan	Magallanes and Chilean Antarctica	1

== Contesting parties and coalitions ==
71 lists of candidates were submitted and approved by the Electoral Service (Servel). Three run on all 16 regions of the country, including the three largest coalitions with parliamentary representation. 2 coalition lists and the 3 parties presented candidates in different regions, but not in all the country. Other 63 lists of independent candidates were presented on a district level; however, some of them congregated on a national level, being The List of the People, Non-Neutral Independents, and Constituent Social Movements, three of the main coalition of independent lists presented in several regions. 28 independent candidates run outside lists, acting as individual lists in each district.

In total, 1278 candidacies were presented for the at-large election.

Coalition		Parties	Ideology	Political position	Previous election (Note: For comparison, only the election of members for the Chamber of Deputies is considered.)		Candidates	
Coalition		Parties	Ideology	Political position	% Votes	Seats	Number	Regions
Logo	Vamos por Chile; Let's go for Chile; List XP.	Chile Vamos: • National Renewal (RN) • Independent Democratic Union (UDI) • Political Evolution (Evopoli) • Democratic Independent Regionalist Party (PRI); Republican Party (PLR)	Conservatism; Economic liberalism National conservatism Nationalism; Liberal conservatism	Centre-right to right-wing with far-right factions	39.02%	72 / 155	184	16
	Lista del Apruebo; List of the Approve; List YB.	Constituent Unity: • Socialist Party (PS) • Party for Democracy (PPD) • Radical Party (PR) • Christian Democratic Party (PDC) • Progressive Party (PRO) • Citizens (CIU); Liberal Party (PL)	Social democracy Christian democracy Social liberalism Progressivism	Centre to centre-left with left-wing factions	35.36%	52 / 155	182	16
Logo	Apruebo Dignidad; Approve Dignity; List YQ.	Broad Front: • Democratic Revolution (RD) • Social Convergence (CS) • Commons (Comunes) • UNIR Movement (Movimiento UNIR) • Common Force (FC); Chile Digno: • Communist Party (PC) • Social Green Regionalist Federation (FRVS) • Libertarian Left; Equality Party (PI)	Direct democracy Democratic socialism Socialism of the 21st century Green politics Communism	Left-wing to far-left	15.51%	24 / 155	171	16
Logo	La Lista del Pueblo; The List of the People; Lists E., G., J., N., Q., S., WD., WJ., XC., XD., XJ., XT., YL., YP., ZD., ZE., ZI. and ZN.	Coalition of multiple lists of independent candidates	Anti-establishment	Left-wing to far-left	New list		155	15
Logo	Independientes No Neutrales; Non-Neutral Independents; Lists I., L., XR., YF., YU., YV., ZA. and ZT. (Note: List YU is shared between Non-Neutral Independents and Constituent Social Movements to reduce dispersion of votes: candidates Jocelyn Durán and Esteban Quiroz are affiliated with NNI and the 6 other candidates of the list to MSC.)	Coalition of multiple lists of independent candidates	Progressivism	Centre	New list		121	12
	Partido Ecologista Verde; Green Ecologist Party; List XA.	Green Ecologist Party (PEV)	Green politics	Centre-left to Left-wing	1.30%	1 / 155	76	8
	Movimientos Sociales Constituyentes; Constituent Social Movements; Lists T., XI., YK., YT., YU., ZH., ZK. and ZL.	Coalition of multiple lists of independent candidates		Left-wing	New list		60	4
Logo	Partido de Trabajadores Revolucionarios; Revolutionary Workers Party; List ZR.	Revolutionary Workers Party (PTR)	Anti-capitalism; Trotskyism	Far-left	0.08%	0 / 155	52	5
Logo	Unión Patriótica; Patriotic Union; List ZB.	Patriotic Union: • Communist P. (Proletarian Action) (PC-AP) • Revolutionary Left Movement (MIR) • Several smaller groups and movements	Anti-imperialism; Marxism–Leninism; Left-wing nationalism	Far-left	0.86%	0 / 155	52	4
Logo	Ciudadanos Cristianos; Christian Citizens; List YX.	Christian Conservative Party; National Citizen Party	Christian right Christian fundamentalism Right-wing populism	Right-wing to far-right	New list		26	5
Logo	Partido Humanista; Humanist Party; List XG.	Humanist Party	Left-wing populism	Left-wing	0.63%	5 / 155	7	3
	Lists of independent candidates 29 different lists				1.75%	1 / 155	164	13
	Independent candidates outside lists				1.75%	1 / 155	28	11

== Results ==
=== By alliance/pact ===
Party	Votes	%	Seats
At-large
Vamos por Chile	1,174,502	20.56	37
Apruebo Dignidad	1,070,361	18.74	28
The List of the People	927,603	16.24	26
Lista del Apruebo	825,397	14.45	25
Non-Neutral Independents	473,194	8.29	11
Constituent Social Movements	243,986	4.27	3
Green Ecologist Party	194,783	3.41	0
Revolutionary Workers Party	52,421	0.92	0
Patriotic Union	42,135	0.74	0
Christian Citizens	37,479	0.66	0
Humanist Party	29,084	0.51	0
Other independent lists	408,289	7.15	7
Independents	232,020	4.06	1
Total	5,711,254	100.00	138
Valid votes	5,711,254	92.28	
Invalid votes	187,760	3.03	
Blank votes	289,713	4.68	
Total votes	6,188,727	100.00	
Indigenous seats
Indigenous seats: Mapuche	217,884	83.02	7
Indigenous seats: Aymara	19,241	7.33	2
Indigenous seats: Diaguita	11,239	4.28	1
Indigenous seats: Lickanantay	6,772	2.58	1
Indigenous seats: Colla	2,138	0.81	1
Indigenous seats: Quechua	2,076	0.79	1
Indigenous seats: Rapa Nui	1,871	0.71	1
Indigenous seats: Chango	910	0.35	1
Indigenous seats: Kawésqar	249	0.09	1
Indigenous seats: Yaghan	61	0.02	1
Total	262,441	100.00	17
Valid votes	262,441	92.59	
Invalid votes	5,312	1.87	
Blank votes	15,686	5.53	
Total votes	283,439	100.00	
Registered voters/turnout	1,239,295	22.87	
Total turnout
All parties and indigenous candidates	5,973,695	100.00	155
Total	5,973,695	100.00	155
Valid votes	5,973,695	92.30	
Invalid votes	193,072	2.98	
Blank votes	305,399	4.72	
Total votes	6,472,166	100.00	
Registered voters/turnout	14,900,190	43.44	
Source: SERVEL

=== By party ===
Party or alliance		Votes	%	Seats
Vamos por Chile	Independent Democrat Union	447,032	7.83	17
Vamos por Chile	National Renewal	413,057	7.23	15
Vamos por Chile	Evópoli	255,069	4.47	5
Vamos por Chile	Republican Party	59,344	1.04	0
Apruebo Dignidad	Democratic Revolution	342,199	5.99	9
Apruebo Dignidad	Communist Party of Chile	285,216	4.99	7
Apruebo Dignidad	Social Convergence	184,320	3.23	6
Apruebo Dignidad	Social Green Regionalist Federation	99,411	1.74	4
Apruebo Dignidad	Comunes	91,659	1.60	1
Apruebo Dignidad	Equality Party	67,556	1.18	1
The List of the People	The List of the People	861,580	15.09	23
The List of the People	Insular and Independent	27,064	0.47	1
The List of the People	Constituent Assembly of Atacama	18,427	0.32	1
The List of the People	Social Coordinator of Magallanes	9,510	0.17	1
The List of the People	Tarapacá United People	5,978	0.10	0
The List of the People	A Pulso, For a Good Life	5,044	0.09	0
Lista del Apruebo	Socialist Party of Chile	276,455	4.84	15
Lista del Apruebo	Christian Democratic Party	208,339	3.65	2
Lista del Apruebo	Party for Democracy	147,356	2.58	3
Lista del Apruebo	Liberal Party of Chile	71,283	1.25	3
Lista del Apruebo	Radical Party of Chile	67,411	1.18	1
Lista del Apruebo	Progressive Party	32,917	0.58	1
Lista del Apruebo	Citizens	21,636	0.38	0
Non-Neutral Independents	Independents for the New Constitution	458,868	8.03	11
Non-Neutral Independents	Non Neutral from Magallanes	4,245	0.07	0
Non-Neutral Independents	Independents and Social Movements of the Approval	10,081	0.18	0
Other independent lists	Constituent Popular Assembly	35,778	0.63	1
Other independent lists	Independents from the North Movement	31,490	0.55	1
Other independent lists	Independents with Chile	28,947	0.51	0
Other independent lists	Independents without Sponsors	27,913	0.49	0
Other independent lists	Biobío without Parties	24,542	0.43	0
Other independent lists	Independents from Coquimbo Region	23,733	0.42	1
Other independent lists	Independents of the Approval - Coquimbo Region	23,612	0.41	0
Other independent lists	Autonomous Social Movements	22,881	0.40	1
Other independent lists	Independent Flows	20,806	0.36	1
Other independent lists	Independents like You	17,832	0.31	0
Other independent lists	Sixth Region United	16,381	0.29	0
Other independent lists	Citizen Decision	13,214	0.23	0
Other independent lists	Independent Community of Maule	11,439	0.20	0
Other independent lists	Independents of Tarapacá	11,081	0.19	1
Other independent lists	"Ven Seremos" Independent Community	10,792	0.19	0
Other independent lists	Independent Citizen Regionalism	10,173	0.18	1
Other independent lists	Independent Chile	9,959	0.17	0
Other independent lists	Citizen Sovereignty	9,901	0.17	0
Other independent lists	List for Social Justice	9,710	0.17	0
Other independent lists	Social Birth Independent List	8,674	0.15	0
Other independent lists	Our Voices	6,044	0.11	0
Other independent lists	Join Now	5,906	0.10	0
Other independent lists	Noble Childs of Tarapacá	5,519	0.10	0
Other independent lists	Independent Energy	5,320	0.09	0
Other independent lists	Arica, Always Arica	4,571	0.08	0
Other independent lists	Social and Union Autonomy Tarapacá	3,449	0.06	0
Other independent lists	We are all Patagonia	3,298	0.06	0
Other independent lists	Magallanes Republic of Independents	3,244	0.06	0
Other independent lists	Self-Convened Council	2,080	0.04	0
Constituent Social Movements	Constituent Social Movements	212,324	3.72	3
Constituent Social Movements	Independents and Social Movements of the Approval	31,662	0.55	0
Green Ecologist Party		194,783	3.41	0
Revolutionary Workers Party		52,421	0.92	0
Patriotic Union		42,135	0.74	0
Christian Citizens	Christian Conservative Party	27,283	0.48	0
Christian Citizens	National Citizen Party	10,196	0.18	0
Humanist Party		29,084	0.51	0
Independents		232,020	4.06	1
Total		5,711,254	100.00	138
Valid votes		5,711,254	92.28	
Invalid votes		187,760	3.03	
Blank votes		289,713	4.68	
Total votes		6,188,727	100.00	
Source: SERVEL

=== Indigenous seats ===
Indigenous people	Valid votes		Invalid votes	Blank votes	Valid votes	Eligible voters	Turnout	Candidates	Seats
Indigenous people	Votes	%	Invalid votes	Blank votes	Valid votes	Eligible voters	Turnout	Candidates	Seats
Mapuche	217,884	91.94%	4,620	14,485	236,989	1,063,980	22.27%	39	7
Aymara	19,241	95.35%	305	634	20,180	75,743	26.64%	18	2
Diaguita	11,239	96.83%	138	230	11,607	53,887	21.54%	5	1
Lickanantay	6,772	96.37%	109	146	7,027	22,569	31.14%	8	1
Colla	2,138	96.70%	19	54	2,211	9,183	24.08%	8	1
Quechua	2,076	95.05%	55	53	2,184	7,661	28.51%	4	1
Rapa Nui	1,871	95.22%	33	61	1,965	3,623	54.24%	4	1
Chango	910	94.89%	28	21	959	1,951	49.15%	3	1
Kawésqar	249	99.60%	1	0	250	528	47.35%	5	1
Yaghan	61	91.04%	4	2	67	170	39.41%	1	1
Total	262,441	92.59%	5,312	15,686	283,439	1,239,295	22.87%	95	17

== Composition ==
- Gender: 78 men and 77 women were elected. Due to the corrections applied to ensure gender parity in each constituency, 4 women and 7 men were elected replacing a different-sex member of their own list with a larger number of votes.
- Age: The age average of the elected members was 44.5 years. The oldest member was 78 years old at the time of the election, while the youngest was 21 years old.
- Occupation: 59 of the elected members are lawyers and additional 7 were law students. 20 elected members were teachers, 9 were engineers and 5 were journalists. 6 elected members were former members of Congress and 9 were former government authorities.
- LGBT: At least 7 of the 155 elected members of the Convention declared to be part of a gender or sexual minority.

=== Members ===
- Damaris Abarca, Chilean lawyer
- Gloria Alvarado, Chilean activist
- Amaya Alvez, Chilean lawyer
- Adriana Ampuero, Chilean lawyer
- Francisca Arauna, Chilean lawyer
- Martín Arrau, Chilean engineer
- Margarita Letelier Cortés, Chilean entrepreneur
- Paola Grandón, Chilean activist
