= 2021 Chilean gubernatorial elections =

1st regional gubernatorial elections in Chile

2021 Chilean regional elections
May 15–16, 2021	2024 →
- Registered: 14,900,190
- Turnout: 43.38% (1st round); 19.62% (2nd round)
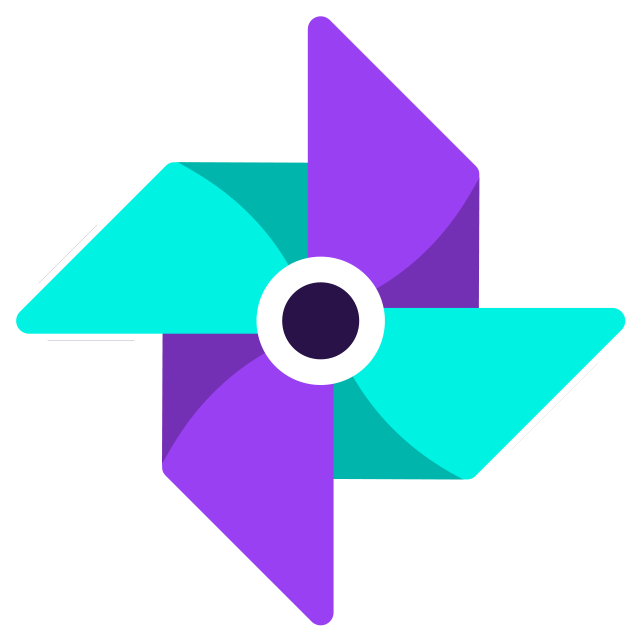

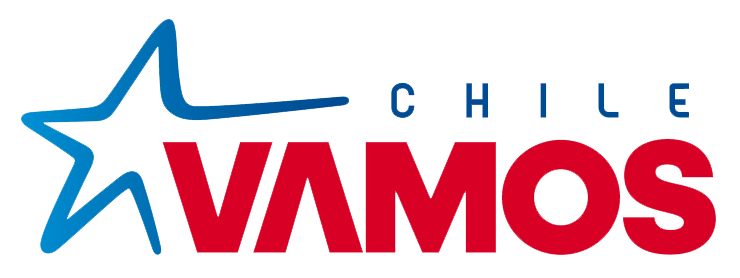
Party	Constituent Unity ▻: Socialist; PPD; Radical; Christian Dem.; Progressive; Citizens	Chile Vamos ▻: RN; UDI; Evópoli; PRI	Broad Front ▻: RD; CS; Commons; Liberal
Popular vote	1,571,623	1,177,517	1,002,432
Percentage	25.9%	19.4%	16.5%
- A map presenting the results of the first round

The first election of regional governors was held on May 15 and 16, 2021, alongside elections for members of the Constitutional Convention and local authorities. The process included the direct election of regional governors for Chile's 16 regions, the country's first-level administrative divisions. Their term extends from July 17, 2021, to January 6, 2025. If none of the candidates received more than 40% of the votes, a second round was held on June 13, 2021.

The election of regional governors was originally scheduled for October 25, 2020, but the COVID-19 pandemic altered the entire election schedule in Chile, moving the 2020 national plebiscite from April 26 to October 25. The election of regional governors was then rescheduled for April 21, 2021, extending the term of the mayors elected in the previous election.

Due to the pandemic, the election of regional governors along with other concurrent elections was extended to two days (April 10 and 11) to avoid crowding, making it the first election in Chile to be held over more than one day.

Eventually, the elections were once again postponed to May 15 and 16, 2021, due to a rise in COVID-19 cases, while election of regional board members was held on November 21, 2021, alongside the presidential and parliamentary elections.

== Results ==
=== Overall ===
Party	First round			Second round			Total seats
Party	Votes	%	Seats	Votes	%	Seats	Total seats
Constituent Unity	1,571,623	25.89	2	1,198,343	47.48	8	10
Chile Vamos	1,177,517	19.40	0	340,213	13.48	1	1
Broad Front	1,002,432	16.51	1	723,856	28.68	1	2
Ecologists and Independents	706,867	11.64	0	65,550	2.60	1	1
Let's Humanize Chile	360,496	5.94	0			0	0
For Regional Dignity	232,185	3.82	0			0	0
Republicans	207,913	3.42	0			0	0
Green Regionalists	183,332	3.02	0			0	0
Equality for Chile	135,508	2.23	0			0	0
Patriotic Union	62,024	1.02	0			0	0
Independent Christians	33,320	0.55	0			0	0
Revolutionary Workers Party	21,442	0.35	0			0	0
National Citizen Party	16,413	0.27	0			0	0
Independents	359,904	5.93	0	196,128	7.77	2	2
Total	6,070,976	100.00	3	2,524,090	100.00	13	16
Valid votes	6,065,507	93.83		2,524,090	98.64		
Invalid/blank votes	398,813	6.17		34,872	1.36		
Total votes	6,464,320	100.00		2,558,962	100.00		
Registered voters/turnout	14,900,190	43.38		13,040,819	19.62		
Source: SERVEL

=== Results per region ===
Region	Total votes		Constituent Union			Chile Vamos			Broad Front			Other candidate			Others	
Region	Votes	Turnout	Candidate	Votes	%	Candidate	Votes	%	Candidate	Votes	%	Candidate	Votes	%	Votes	%
Arica and Parinacota	70,452	36.8%	Jorge Díaz (PDC)	18,407	27.4%	Enrique Lee (Ind.)	21,126	31.5%	—			Orlando Vargas (Ind.)	17,936	26.7%	9,621	14.3%
Arica and Parinacota	35,974	18.8%	Jorge Díaz (PDC)	20,385	57.7%	Enrique Lee (Ind.)	14,971	42,3%	—			Orlando Vargas (Ind.)	—		—	
Tarapacá	96,270	37.1%	Marco A. Pérez (Ind.)	23.313	25.5%	Jorge Fistonic (UDI)	19,668	21.5%	José M. Carvajal (COM)	26,088	28.6%	—			22,232	24.4%
Tarapacá	35,085	13.5%	Marco A. Pérez (Ind.)	14,793	43.0%	Jorge Fistonic (UDI)	—		José M. Carvajal (COM)	19,629	57.0%	—			—	
Antofagasta	177,378	36.9%	Ricardo Díaz (Ind.)	66,478	39.6%	Marco Díaz (RN)	36,144	21.5%	Paulina Orellana (RD)	27,540	16.4%	Lester Calderón (PTR)	21,442	12.8%	16,220	9.7%
Antofagasta	58,716	12.2%	Ricardo Díaz (Ind.)	41,863	72.0%	Marco Díaz (RN)	16,252	28.0%	Paulina Orellana (RD)	—		Lester Calderón (PTR)	—		—	
Atacama	97,264	40.1%	Carlo Pezo (Ind.)	27,635	30.2%	Fernando Ghiglino (RN)	11,672	12.8%	—			Miguel Vargas (Ind.)	21,692	23.7%	30,499	33.3%
Atacama	30,694	12.7%	Carlo Pezo (Ind.)	12,039	40.6%	Fernando Ghiglino (RN)	—		—			Miguel Vargas (Ind.)	17,604	59.4%	—	
Coquimbo	253,459	41.3%	Ricardo Cifuentes (PDC)	60,909	25.4%	Marco Sulantay (UDI)	62,640	27.3%	—			Krist Naranjo (I-PEV)	65,435	26.1%	50,875	21.2%
Coquimbo	106,873	17.4%	Ricardo Cifuentes (PDC)	—		Marco Sulantay (UDI)	40,238	38.0%	—			Krist Naranjo (I-PEV)	65,550	62.0%	—	
Valparaíso	722,752	45.2%	Aldo Valle (Ind.)	136,819	20.0%	Manuel Millones (Ind.)	161,715	23.7%	Rodrigo Mundaca (Ind.)	298,398	43.7%	Marco Oyanedel (Ind.)	43,625	6.4%	42,165	6.2%
Valparaíso	Elected 1st round		Aldo Valle (Ind.)	—		Manuel Millones (Ind.)	—		Rodrigo Mundaca (Ind.)	298,398	43.7%	Marco Oyanedel (Ind.)	—		—	
Santiago Metropolitan	2,653,345	45.3%	Claudio Orrego (PDC)	654,117	25.5%	Catalina Parot (EVO)	382,918	14.9%	Karina Oliva (COM)	599,418	23.4%	Nathalie Joignant (PEV)	389,814	15.2%	539,135	21.0%
Santiago Metropolitan	1,505,266	25.7%	Claudio Orrego (PDC)	785,023	52.7%	Catalina Parot (EVO)	—		Karina Oliva (COM)	704.227	47.3%	Nathalie Joignant (PEV)	—		—	
O'Higgins	366,329	47.4%	Pablo Silva (PS)	80,779	24.3%	Eduardo Cornejo (UDI)	73,623	22.2%	—			Esteban Valenzuela (FREVS)	67,836	20.4%	110,081	33.1%
O'Higgins	119,991	15.5%	Pablo Silva (PS)	67,576	57.7%	Eduardo Cornejo (UDI)	49,617	42.3%	—			Esteban Valenzuela (FREVS)	—		—	
Maule	386,670	43.7%	Cristina Bravo (PDC)	98,772	28.3%	George Bordachar (RN)	62,944	18.0%	—			Francisco Pulgar (Ind.)	83,585	24.0%	103,638	29.7%
Maule	121,323	13.7%	Cristina Bravo (PDC)	68,261	57.3%	George Bordachar (RN)	—		—			Francisco Pulgar (Ind.)	50,832	42.7%	—	
Ñuble	182,900	42.7%	Óscar Crisóstomo (PS)	50,594	31.2%	Jezer Sepúlveda (UDI)	43,855	27.1%	Ignacio Marín (RD)	22.205	13.7%	Julio Becerra (I-PEV)	17,861	11.0%	27,424	16.9%
Ñuble	69,825	16.3%	Óscar Crisóstomo (PS)	36,372	52.9%	Jezer Sepúlveda (UDI)	32,324	47.1%	Ignacio Marín (RD)	—		Julio Becerra (I-PEV)	—		—	
Biobío	549,968	41.2%	Eric Aedo (PDC)	71,822	14.3%	Flor Weisse (UDI)	97,419	19.4%	—			Rodrigo Díaz (Ind.)	138,439	27.5%	195,584	38.9%
Biobío	182,436	13.7%	Eric Aedo (PDC)	—		Flor Weisse (UDI)	51,248	28.6%	—			Rodrigo Díaz (Ind.)	127,692	71.4%	—	
Araucanía	348,436	39.4%	Eugenio Tuma (PPD)	92,083	30.3%	Luciano Rivas (Ind.)	60,611	19.9%	—			Luis Levi (Ind.)	48,891	16.1%	102,327	33.7%
Araucanía	124,201	14.1%	Eugenio Tuma (PPD)	50,840	41.8%	Luciano Rivas (Ind.)	70,804	58.2%	—			Luis Levi (Ind.)	—		—	
Los Ríos	144,312	41.1%	Luis Cuvertino (PS)	43,892	32.5%	M. José Gatica (RN)	49,742	36.8%	—			Elías Sabat (Ind.)	17,238	12.8%	24,002	17.8%
Los Ríos	73,999	21.1%	Luis Cuvertino (PS)	43,370	59.2%	M. José Gatica (RN)	29,915	40.8%	—			Elías Sabat (Ind.)	—		—	
Los Lagos	305,868	41.3%	Patricio Vallespín (PDC)	99,842	36.4%	Ricardo Kuschel (RN)	70,532	25.8%	Jaime Saez (RD)	26,356	9.6%	Alfonso Belmar (PEV)	44,592	16.3%	32,614	11.9%
Los Lagos	94,579	12.8%	Patricio Vallespín (PDC)	57,821	62.4%	Ricardo Kuschel (RN)	34,844	37.6%	Jaime Saez (RD)	—		Alfonso Belmar (PEV)	—		—	
Aysén	40,701	41.3%	Andrea Macías (PS)	18,283	48.7%	Raúl Rudolphi (RN)	12,860	34.3%	—			Jorge Sepúlveda (Ind.)	6,381	17.0%	—	
Aysén	Elected 1st round		Andrea Macías (PS)	18,283	48.7%	Raúl Rudolphi (RN)	—		—			Jorge Sepúlveda (Ind.)	—		—	
Magallanes and Antarctica	62,855	39.3%	Jorge Flies (Ind.)	24,768	42.1%	Juan José Arcos (PRI)	8,689	14.8%	—			Christian Matheson (Ind.)	13,118	22.3%	12,196	20.8%
Magallanes and Antarctica	Elected 1st round		Jorge Flies (Ind.)	24,768	42.1%	Juan José Arcos (PRI)	—		—			Christian Matheson (Ind.)	—		—	

Source: SERVEL (100% counted)
