= Constanza Martínez =

Chilean politician (born 1987)

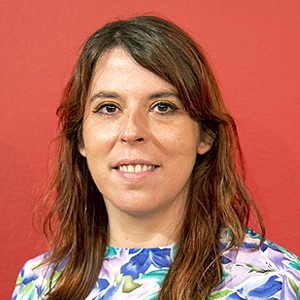
- Martínez in 2022

President of Frente Amplio
- Incumbent
- Assumed office 14 July 2024
- Preceded by: Office established

Presidential Delegate of the Santiago Metropolitan Region
- In office 11 March 2022 – 1 July 2024
- President: Gabriel Boric
- Preceded by: Emardo Hantelmann
- Succeeded by: Gonzalo Durán

Personal details
- Born: 24 August 1987 (age 38)
- Party: Frente Amplio (since 2024)

Constanza Paz Martínez Gil (born 24 August 1987) is a Chilean politician serving as president of Frente Amplio since 2024. From 2022 to 2024, she served as presidential delegate of the Santiago Metropolitan Region. During the 2021 presidential election, she served as executive director of the Gabriel Boric presidential campaign. From 2017 to 2021, she served as advisor and chief of staff to Gonzalo Winter.
