= Adriana Ampuero =

Chilean politician (born 1986)

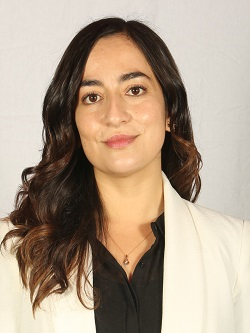
- Official portrait of Adriana Ampuero

Member of the Constituent Conventional
- In office 4 July 2021 – 4 July 2022
- Constituency: 23rd District

Personal details
- Born: 1 December 1986 (age 39)
- Other political affiliations: The List of the People (2021–2022)
- Education: Pontifical Catholic University of Valparaíso (LL.B)
- Occupation: Constituent
- Profession: Lawyer

Adriana Ampuero Barrientos (born 1 December 1986) is a Chilean law graduate and independent politician.

She served as a member of the Constitutional Convention, representing the 26th District of the Los Lagos Region. During the convention, she coordinated the Commission on Decentralization, Equity and Territorial Justice.

== Biography ==
Ampuero was born on 1 December 1986 in Puerto Montt, Los Lagos Region. She is the daughter of Renato Ampuero Vera and Adriana Barrientos Cárcamo. She is single.

She completed her secondary education at Colegio Cahuala Insular. She later studied law at the Pontifical Catholic University of Valparaíso (PUCV).

== Political and social activity ==
Ampuero is an independent politician. Since 2013, she has been involved in the Colectivo de Chilotes en Valparaíso, and in 2016 she joined the Coordinadora de Chilotes en el Continente. Following the 2019 social unrest in Chile, she became an active member of the Legal and Human Rights Team of the Castro Assembly.

She is currently a spokesperson for the Movimiento Archipiélago Soberano and an active member of the Network of Territorial Organizations and Assemblies of Chiloé.

== Constitutional Convention ==
In the elections held on 15 and 16 May 2021, Ampuero ran as a candidate for the Constitutional Convention representing the 26th District of the Los Lagos Region, as part of the Insulares e Independientes list within the Lista del Pueblo electoral pact. She obtained 10,604 votes, corresponding to 8.17% of the valid votes cast, and was elected as a constitutional delegate.

During her tenure in the Constitutional Convention, she served as coordinator of the Commission on Decentralization, Equity and Territorial Justice.
