= The List of the People =

Chilean political coalition

People's List La Lista del Pueblo
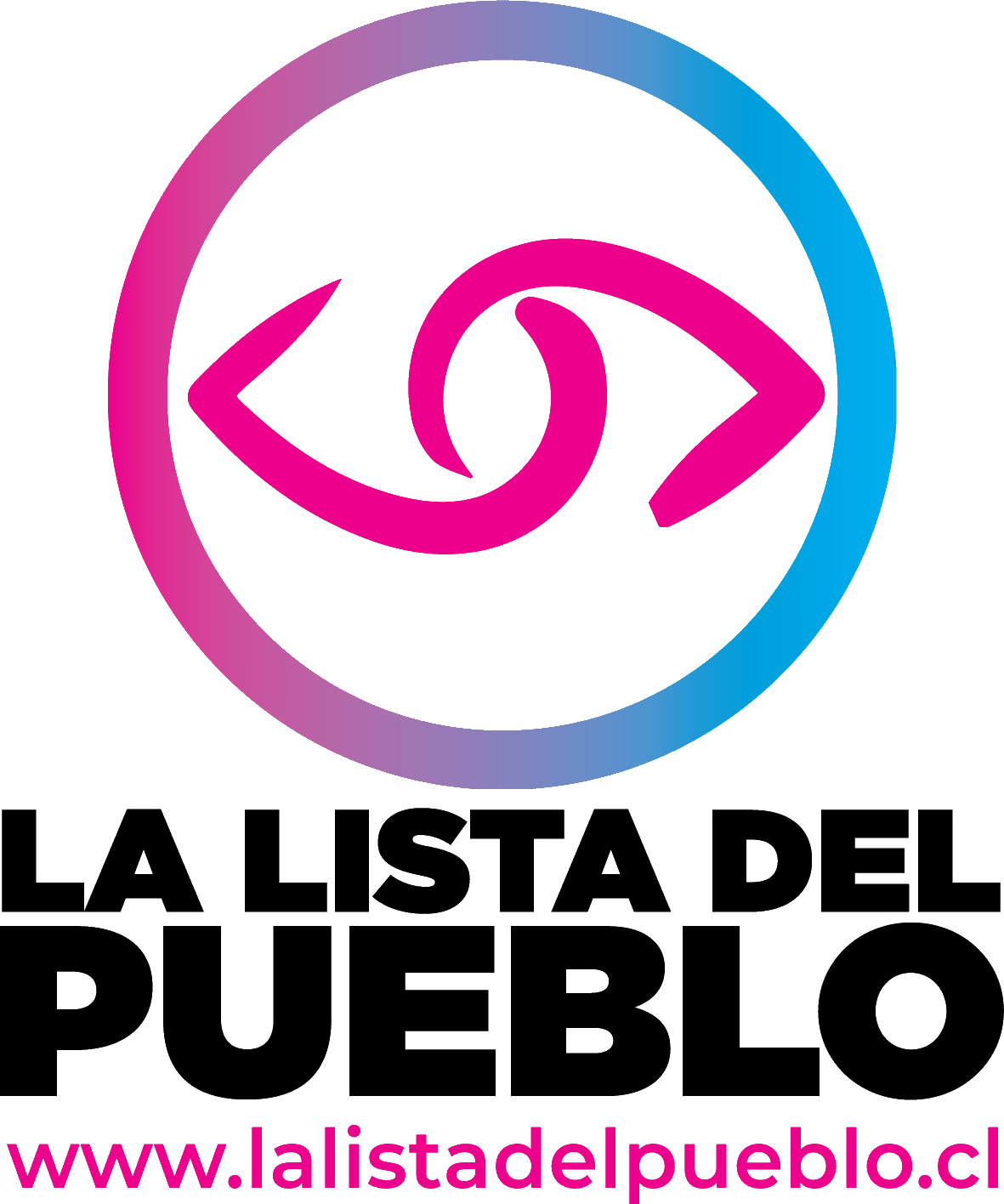
- National coordinators: Rafael Ferrada; Mauricio Menéndez; Leonardo Ponce
- Founded: 13 November 2020; 4 years ago
- Dissolved: 2022
- Think tank: Constituent Electoral Power
- Ideology: Left-wing populism Anti-neoliberalism; Anti-establishment; Anti-elitism; Environmentalism; Direct democracy Participatory democracy Semi-presidentialism; Factions; Trotskyism; Marxism
- Political position: Left-wing to far-left

Website
- lalistadelpueblo.cl

The List of the People (Spanish: La Lista del Pueblo) was a loose coalition of independent candidates that was created in Chile to participate in the 2021 elections for members of the Constitutional Convention. Despite its success in the May 2021 elections, a series of scandals made most of its members have to leave the coalition since then. In the Constitutional Convention many of its former members continue to collaborate as part of the "Pueblo Constituyente" group.

The pact intended to represent the people that protested in the Estallido social, the civil unrest that started the process to create a new constitution. Some of the policies agreed between the candidates participating in the list are the commitment to an "environmental, egalitarian and participatory state", the end to the current private pension system, rejection of the TPP-11 and "end to the exploitation of the environment". The coalition was anti-establishment and anti-elitist, especially regarding the right-wing government of Sebastián Piñera and its political allies. The group had also manifested their intention to hold popular assemblies for the decisions their members will present in the Constitutional Convention.

The List of the People was one of the surprises of the election, obtaining the third largest number of votes and 27 seats, surpassing even the Constituent Unity, the main centre-left alliance.

== Composition ==
Due to the electoral system, different lists were presented to the election; some included the name "List of the People" or a variation, while others had different names. The lists considered as part of The List of the People on a national level were:

- E. Pueblo Unido Tarapacá
- G. Insulares e Independientes
- J. Elige La Lista del Pueblo
- N. La Lista del Pueblo Distrito 9
- Q. Lista del Pueblo Transformando desde el Willi
- S. Independientes Distrito 6 + Lista del Pueblo
- WD. Movimiento Territorial Constituyente
- WJ. Asamblea Constituyente Atacama
- XC. A Pulso, por el buen vivir
- XD. Lista del Pueblo - Ríos Independientes
- XJ. Fuerza Social de Ñuble, La Lista del Pueblo
- XT. Movimiento Social Constituyente / La Lista del Pueblo
- YL. La Lista del Pueblo Distrito 12
- YP. La Lista del Pueblo 100% Independiente
- ZD. La Lista del Pueblo Maule Sur
- ZE. Movimiento Social La Lista del Pueblo
- ZI. Coordinadora Social de Magallanes
- ZN. La Lista del Pueblo
