= Yarela Gómez =

Chilean constituent

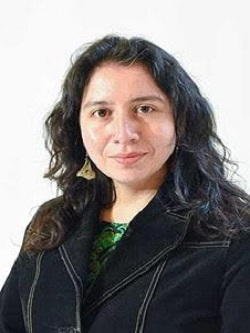

Member of the Constitutional Convention
- In office 4 July 2021 – 4 July 2022
- Constituency: 27th District

Personal details
- Born: 8 June 1990 (age 36) Coyhaique, Chile
- Party: Social Convergence
- Education: Austral University of Chile (BA)
- Occupation: Constituent
- Profession: Teacher

Yarela Gómez Sánchez (born 8 June 1990) is a Chilean teacher and independent politician. She served as a member of the Constitutional Convention between 2021 and 2022, representing the 27th District of the Aysén Region.

She served as an Adjunct Vice President of the Convention from 19 April 2022.

== Biography ==
Gómez was born on 8 June 1990 in Coyhaique, Chile. She is the daughter of Víctor Hugo Gómez Díaz and Erica María Sánchez Mansilla.

=== Professional career ===
She completed her primary and secondary education at Escuela República Argentina and Liceo República Argentina in Coyhaique. She studied Language and Communication Teaching at the Austral University of Chile.

Professionally, Gómez worked as a coordinator and teacher at the Amanda Labarca popular education school. She has also worked in higher education inclusion programs.

== Political career ==
Gómez is an independent politician and a member of the Movimiento Aysén Constituyente. She has participated as a volunteer in the NGO Asher, contributing to the recovery project of the Las Lumas stream, and served as regional president of Convergencia Social Aysén. She has also been involved in the Feminist Teachers Network and is a member of MODATIMA Aysén, a movement focused on water, land, and environmental protection.

In the elections held on 15–16 May 2021, she ran as an independent candidate for the Constitutional Convention representing the 27th District of the Aysén Region, as part of the Apruebo Dignidad pact, in a seat allocated to Revolución Democrática. She was elected with 2,259 votes, corresponding to 6.89% of the valid votes cast.

On 19 April 2022, Gómez replaced Amaya Alvez as an Adjunct Vice President of the Constitutional Convention.
