= Germán Codina =

Chilean politician

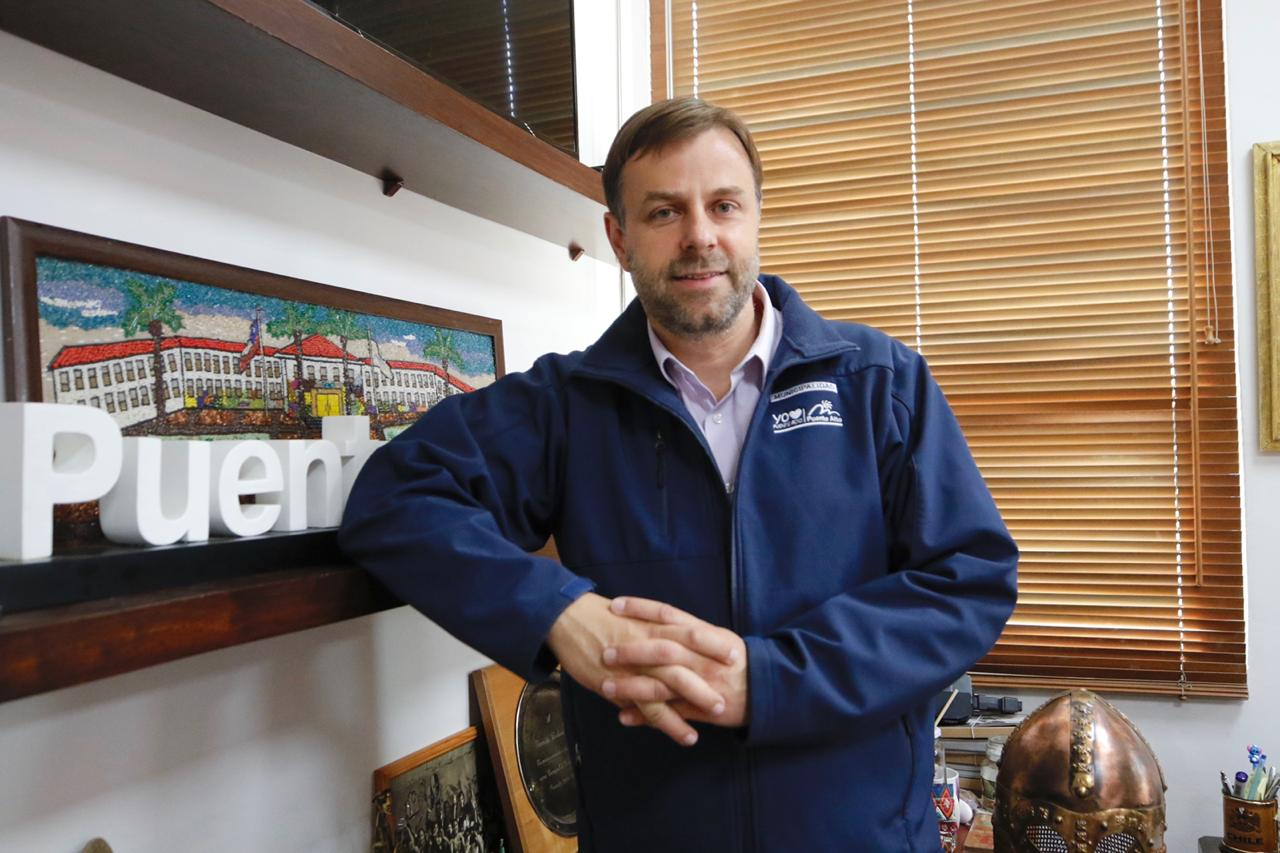

Presidential Delegate of the Santiago Metropolitan Region
- Incumbent
- Assumed office 11 March 2026
- President: José Antonio Kast
- Preceded by: Gonzalo Durán

Mayor of Puente Alto
- In office 6 December 2012 – 15 November 2024
- Preceded by: Manuel José Ossandón
- Succeeded by: Matías Toledo

Councilman of Puente Alto
- In office 6 December 2008 – 6 December 2012

Personal details
- Born: 28 March 1974 (age 52) Montevideo, Uruguay
- Party: National Renewal (until 2024)
- Children: 4
- Education: University of Chile (BA) (MA)
- Occupation: Politician
- Profession: Public Administrator

Germán Codina Powers (born 28 March 1974) is a Chilean politician who serves as Presidential Delegate of the Santiago Metropolitan Region since 11 March 2026, during the presidency of José Antonio Kast. He previously served as mayor of Puente Alto, commune in Santiago, from 2012 to 2024.
