= Progressive Convergence =

Chilean political coalition

Progressive Convergence Convergencia Progresista
- Leader: Heraldo Muñoz; Carlos Maldonado; Álvaro Elizalde
- Founded: 8 October 2018
- Dissolved: 30 September 2020
- Preceded by: New Majority
- Succeeded by: Constituent Unity
- Headquarters: Santiago de Chile
- Ideology: Third Way; Factions: Social democracy Progressivism
- Political position: Centre to centre-left

Progressive Convergence (Spanish: Convergencia Progresista [kombeɾˈxensja pɾoɣɾeˈsista], CP) was a political alliance in Chile. The alliance was created on 8 October 2018 and was composed of the Party for Democracy (PPD), the Radical Party (PR) and the Socialist Party (PS).

The alliance was created as a coordination group of Chile's social-democratic and center-left parties after the dissolution of the New Majority coalition, which was defeated in the 2017 general election.

The group Sought to dialogue with other parties and coalitions such as the Communist Party and the Broad Front to oppose Chile Vamos. The alliance was supplanted by the Constituent Unity in 2020.

== Composition ==
The alliance was consisted of the three parties of the former New Majority.

Party	Spanish	Leader
Party for Democracy	Partido por la Democracia	Heraldo Muñoz
Social Democrat Radical Party	Partido Radical	Carlos Maldonado
Socialist Party	Partido Socialista	Álvaro Elizalde

== See also ==
- List of political parties in Chile
- New Majority (Chile)
- Chile Vamos
- Broad Front
