= Non-Neutral Independents =

Non-Neutral Independents Independientes No Neutrales
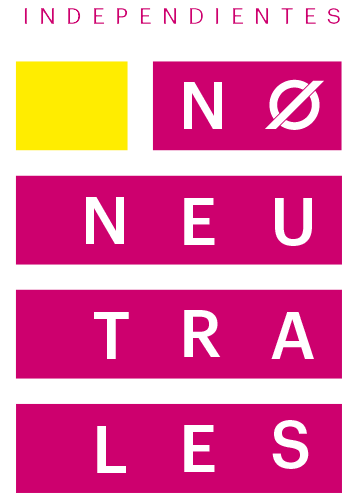
- Founded: 25 August 2020
- Ideology: Big tent
- Political position: Center-left
- Constitutional Convention: 11 / 155

Election symbol
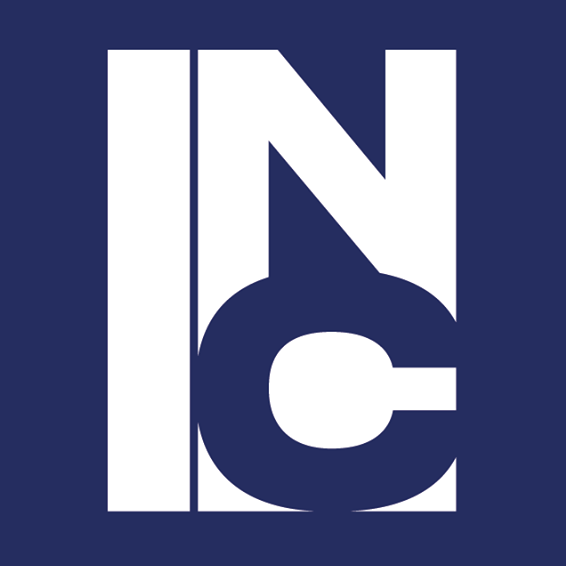

Website
- independientesnoneutrales.cl

Non-Neutral Independents (Spanish: Independientes No Neutrales) is a loose coalition of independent candidates that was created in Chile to participate in the 2021 elections for members of the Constitutional Convention.

== History ==
It was established on 25 August 2020 by a group of civil society citizens, including Agustín Squella, Benito Baranda, Andrea Repetto, Rodrigo Jordán, Heinrich von Baer and Eduardo Engel, with the intention of supporting the options "Approve" and "Constitutional Convention" in the plebiscite of the same year. They expressed that "a new Constitution is needed to define the bases of an updated institutionality, with a modern chapter of duly guaranteed fundamental rights, a balanced and transparent national, regional and communal political regime, a recognition of the plurinational character of the country, a greater and effective decentralization, and a review of its constitutional justice".

After the referendum, the group began to make its list of candidates for the Constitutional Convention, led by Benito Baranda, and it also began to gather the necessary signatures to confirm its legality for the election. Among its candidates there were more than 30 people from different regions of Chile, including the journalist Patricia Politzer and the constitutional lawyer Miriam Henríquez.

To facilitate the participation of independent candidates in the elections for the Constitutional Convention, the movement has requested that legal changes be made to reduce the number of signatures required to sponsor independent candidates, facilitate said sponsorship by means of a digital signature and allow the formation of agreements between independents. Its efforts include participation in Senate committees where these legislative reforms are discussed.

== Composition ==
The group submitted lists of independent candidates in 21 of the 28 electoral districts. The names used by the Non-Neutral Independent lists varied by district:

- «Independientes por la Nueva Constitución», meaning «Independents for the New Constitution» (districts 4, 6, 10, 11, 14, 17, 22, 23, 24 y 25)
- «Independientes por una Nueva Constitución», meaning «Independents for a New Constitution» (districts 1, 7, 9, 12 y 21)
- «Independientes del Norte Grande por una Nueva Constitución», meaning «Independents of the Great North for a New Constitution» (district 3)
- «Independientes y Movimientos Sociales del Apruebo», meaning «Independents and Social Movements of Approval» (district 8)
- «Independientes de Ñuble por la Nueva Constitución», meaning «Independents of Ñuble for the New Constitution» (district 19)
- «Independientes del Biobío por una Nueva Constitución», meaning «Independents of Biobío for a New Constitution» (district 20)
- «Independientes Nueva Constitución», meaning «New Constitution Independents» (district 26)
- «Magallánicos No Neutrales» (district 28)
