= New Time (Chile) =

Chilean political party

New Time Nuevo Tiempo
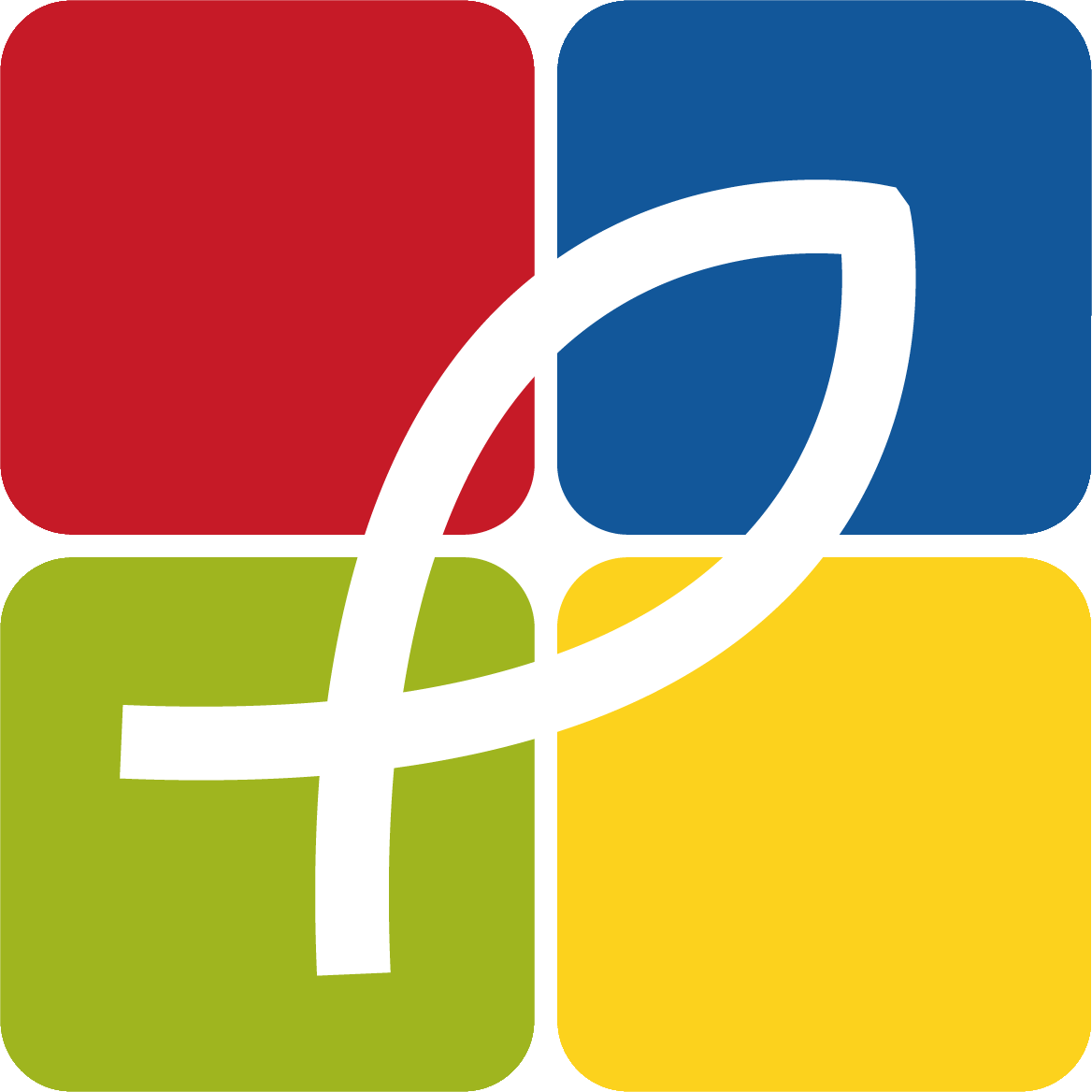
- Leader: Josué Wladimir Cortés Rondoy
- Secretary: Sebastián Rodrigo Alfaro Olivares
- Founded: 21 March 2016; 10 years ago
- Registered: 10 July 2019
- Dissolved: February 2022
- Ideology: Right-wing antiglobalism Theoconservatism; Christian right Anti-abortion; Social conservatism Confessionalism
- Political position: Right-wing
- Religion: Evangelicalism
- Communal Councils: 1 / 2,224

Website
- http://www.partidonuevotiempo.cl/
- Politics of Chile; Political parties; Elections; a: Currently, this party is de facto active and in the process of legalization

New Time (Spanish: Nuevo Tiempo) was a Chilean evangelical Christian conservative political party. It was officially recognized by the Electoral Service of Chile (Servel) on 10 July 2019. It was located in the Arica y Parinacota, Tarapacá and Antofagasta regions. The party was dissolved in February 2022 because it did not receive at least 5% of the votes in the 2021 parliamentary elections to maintain its legality.
