= Paola Grandón =

Chilean constituent

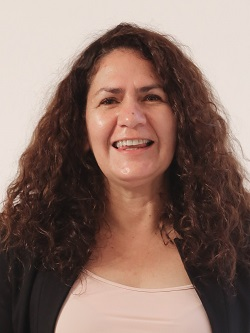

Member of the Constitutional Convention
- In office 4 July 2021 – 4 July 2022
- Constituency: 17th District

Personal details
- Born: 29 August 1973 (age 52) Curicó, Chile
- Party: Social Green Regionalist Federation
- Occupation: Constituent

Paola Grandón González (born 29 August 1973) is a Chilean social activist and politician of the Federation of Regionalist Green Social Forces.

She served as a member of the Constitutional Convention between 2021 and 2022, representing the 17th District of the Maule Region.

== Biography ==
She was born on 29 August 1973 in Providencia, Santiago, Chile. She is the daughter of Julián Grandón and Nancy González. She is divorced.

She completed her secondary education in the technical-professional track at the Instituto Comercial Guillermo González Hein in Providencia, Santiago. Professionally, she worked in the sale of electrical products.

== Political activity ==
Grandón is a member of the Federation of Regionalist Green Social Forces. In the elections held on 15–16 May 2021, she ran as a candidate for the Constitutional Convention representing the 17th District of the Maule Region, as part of the Apruebo Dignidad pact.

She obtained 1,188 votes, corresponding to 0.52% of the valid votes cast.
