= Gloria Alvarado =

Chilean constituent

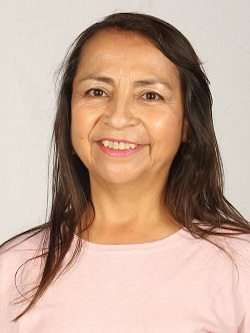

Member of the Constitutional Convention
- In office 4 July 2021 – 4 July 2022
- Constituency: 16th District

Personal details
- Born: 23 March 1963 (age 63) Pichidegua, Chile
- Children: 2

Gloria Alvarado Jorquera (born 23 March 1963) is a Chilean business administrator and independent politician.

She served as a member of the Constitutional Convention representing the 16th District of the O'Higgins Region.

== Biography ==
Alvarado was born on 23 March 1963 in Pataguas Cerro, in the commune of Pichidegua, O'Higgins Region. She is the daughter of Jorge Alvarado Vergara and Inés de las Mercedes Jorquera Morales. She is divorced and the mother of two children.

She obtained a technical degree in Business Administration and Management, as well as a diploma in Cooperative Business Management from the University of Chile.

Since 1987, Alvarado has served as general manager of the Pataguas Cerro Water Cooperative in the commune of Pichidegua.

== Political and social activity ==
She is an independent political figure. She serves as president of Pichidegua Unidos por el Agua and the Environmental Defense Committee of Pichidegua, and since 2014 has been president of the National Federation of Rural Drinking Water Systems of Chile (FENAPRU Chile).

In 2000, she assumed the position of secretary of the Regional Association of Drinking Water Services of the O'Higgins Region (AGRESAP VI Región). She is also a member of the Civil Society for Climate Action (SCAC) and participates in consultative councils related to Subdere and Escenarios Hídricos.

In the elections held on 15 and 16 May 2021, Alvarado ran as an independent candidate for the Constitutional Convention representing the 16th District of the O'Higgins Region, as part of the Corrientes Independientes electoral pact. She obtained 6,352 votes, equivalent to 4.48% of the valid votes cast, securing a seat in the convention.
