= Amaya Alvez =

Chilean scholar

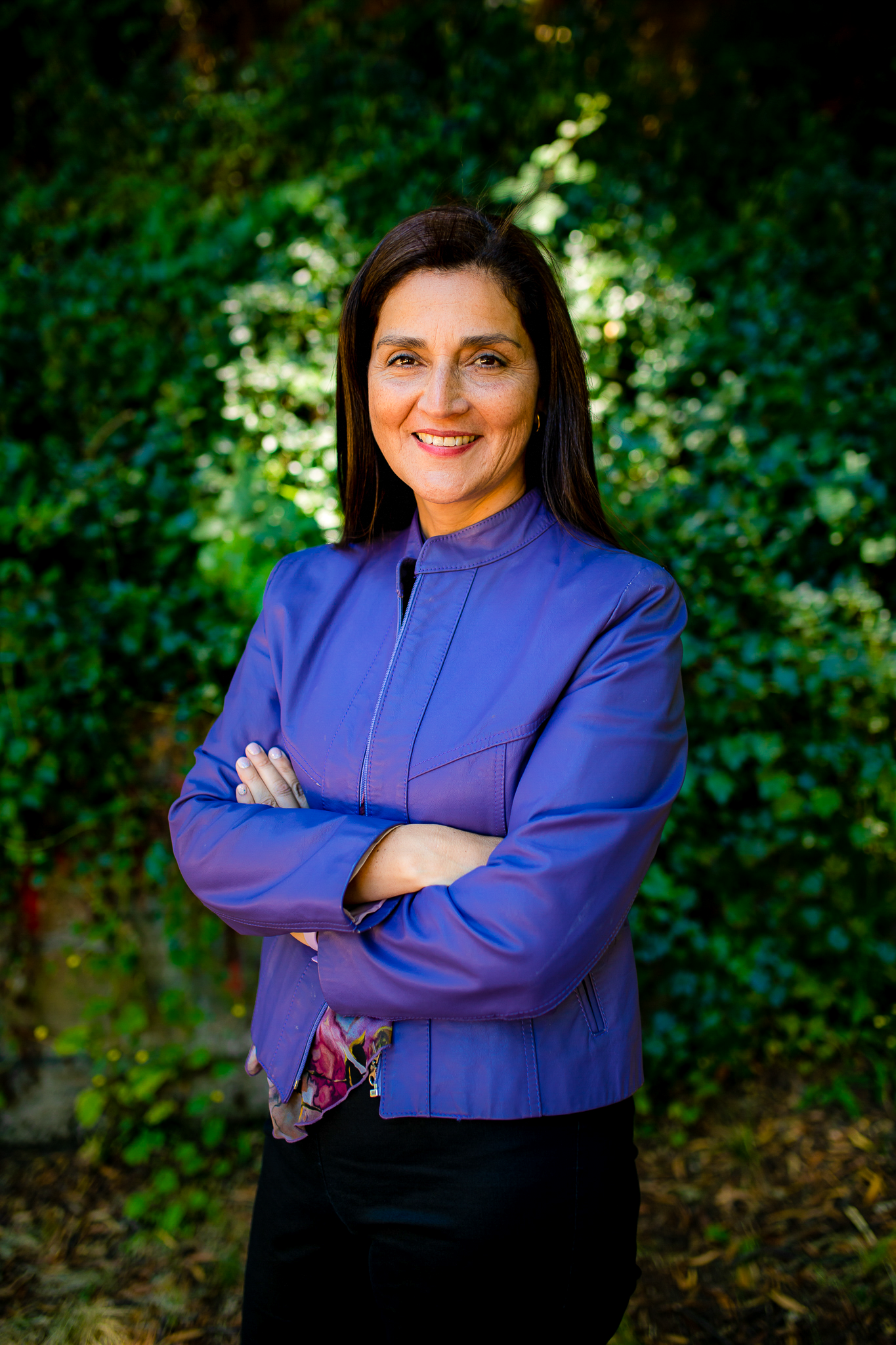

Member of the Constitutional Convention
- In office 4 July 2021 – 4 July 2022
- Constituency: 20th District

Personal details
- Born: 3 April 1971 (age 55) Concepción, Chile
- Party: Democratic Revolution
- Education: University of Concepción (LL.B); York University (PhD)
- Occupation: Constituent
- Profession: Lawyer

Amaya Álvez Marín (born 3 April 1971) is a Chilean lawyer, academic, and politician.

She served as a member of the Constitutional Convention between 2021 and 2022, representing the 20th District of the Biobío Region.

She coordinated the Convention’s Rules Committee and served as an Adjunct Vice President from 6 January to 18 April 2022.

== Early life and family ==
Álvez was born on 3 April 1971 in Concepción, Chile. She is the daughter of Hernán Álvez Catalán and Berta Marín Pérez. She is married to Mauricio Bravo Hornung and is the mother of three children.

== Scholar career ==
She studied law at the University of Concepción, obtaining a licentiate degree in Legal and Social Sciences in 1995. Her undergraduate thesis was titled “Towards a New Legal Form of State for Chile”. She was admitted to the bar on 11 November 1998.

Álvez earned a Master of Laws from the University of Toronto in 2007, with a thesis titled “A Modern Constitutional State for Chile: The Role of Judges”. In 2011, she completed a PhD in Law at York University, Canada, with a doctoral dissertation titled “Chilean Judges Confronted with a Democratic Threshold: Proportionality and Constitutional Rights”. She also holds a Diploma in Advanced Studies in International Relations and European Politics from the University of Liège (1997).

She began her academic career in 1998 at the University of Concepción, where she has served as a professor in the Departments of Public Law and Legal History and Philosophy. Since May 2021, she has held the rank of full professor. She has been a researcher at the Center for Water Resources for Agriculture and Mining (CRHIAM) since 2013 and a member of the Interdisciplinary Research Group on Human Rights and Democracy.

Álvez has been a visiting scholar and lecturer at institutions including King’s College London, Harvard Law School’s Institute for Global Law and Policy, and the University of the Andes in Colombia. She has published extensively on constitutional law, human rights, water regulation, and Indigenous peoples, and has contributed opinion pieces to Ciper Chile.

== Political career ==
Álvez participated in constitutional advocacy initiatives such as Marca Tu Voto (2013), Puentes para una Nueva Constitución (2016), and the Network of Constitutionalists (since 2019). She also took part in the Apruebo campaign ahead of the constitutional plebiscite. She joined Revolución Democrática in 2017.

In the elections held on 15–16 May 2021, she was elected to the Constitutional Convention representing the 20th District of the Biobío Region, as a candidate of Revolución Democrática within the Apruebo Dignidad list. She obtained 18,459 votes, corresponding to 6.05% of the valid votes cast, becoming the most voted candidate in her district.

She served as coordinator of the Convention’s Rules Committee and was ratified as an Adjunct Vice President of the Convention on 6 January 2022. She resigned from the position on 19 April 2022, being replaced by Yarela Gómez.
