= Margarita Letelier Cortés =

Chilean entrepreneur and politician

Margarita Letelier
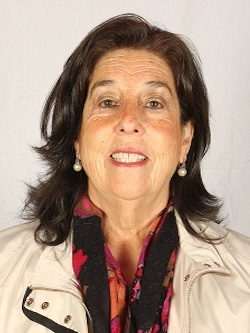

Member of the Constitutional Convention
- In office 4 July 2021 – 4 July 2022
- Constituency: 19th District

Personal details
- Born: 30 October 1953 (age 72) Santiago, Chile
- Party: Independent Democratic Union
- Occupation: Businesspeople

Margarita Letelier Cortés (born 30 October 1953) is a Chilean veterinarian, businesswoman, and politician.

A member of the Independent Democratic Union, she was elected as a member of the Constitutional Convention in 2021, representing the 19th District of the Ñuble Region.

== Early life and family ==
Letelier was born on 30 October 1953 in Santiago, Chile. She is the daughter of Ricardo Letelier Pardo and Jimena Cortés Chadwick.

She is married to Haraldo Wagemann Maldonado.

== Professional career ==
Letelier holds a degree in veterinary medicine.

She has worked professionally as a businesswoman in the dairy sector, specializing in the production and sale of milk. She is the general manager of the company Lácteos San Sebastián, which she founded together with her family more than thirty years ago. She also served as president of the Ñuble River Supervisory Board.

== Political career ==
She has been active as a business and trade association leader in the Ñuble Region, participating in the so-called Multigremial de Chillán.

In the 2017 parliamentary elections, she ran as a candidate for the Chamber of Deputies of Chile representing the 19th District but was not elected.

In the elections held on 15–16 May 2021, Letelier ran as a candidate for the Constitutional Convention representing the 19th District of the Ñuble Region as a member of the Independent Democratic Union, within the Vamos por Chile electoral pact. She obtained 6,104 votes, corresponding to 3.9% of the valid votes cast, and was elected as a member of the Convention.
