= Gonzalo Durán =

Chilean politician

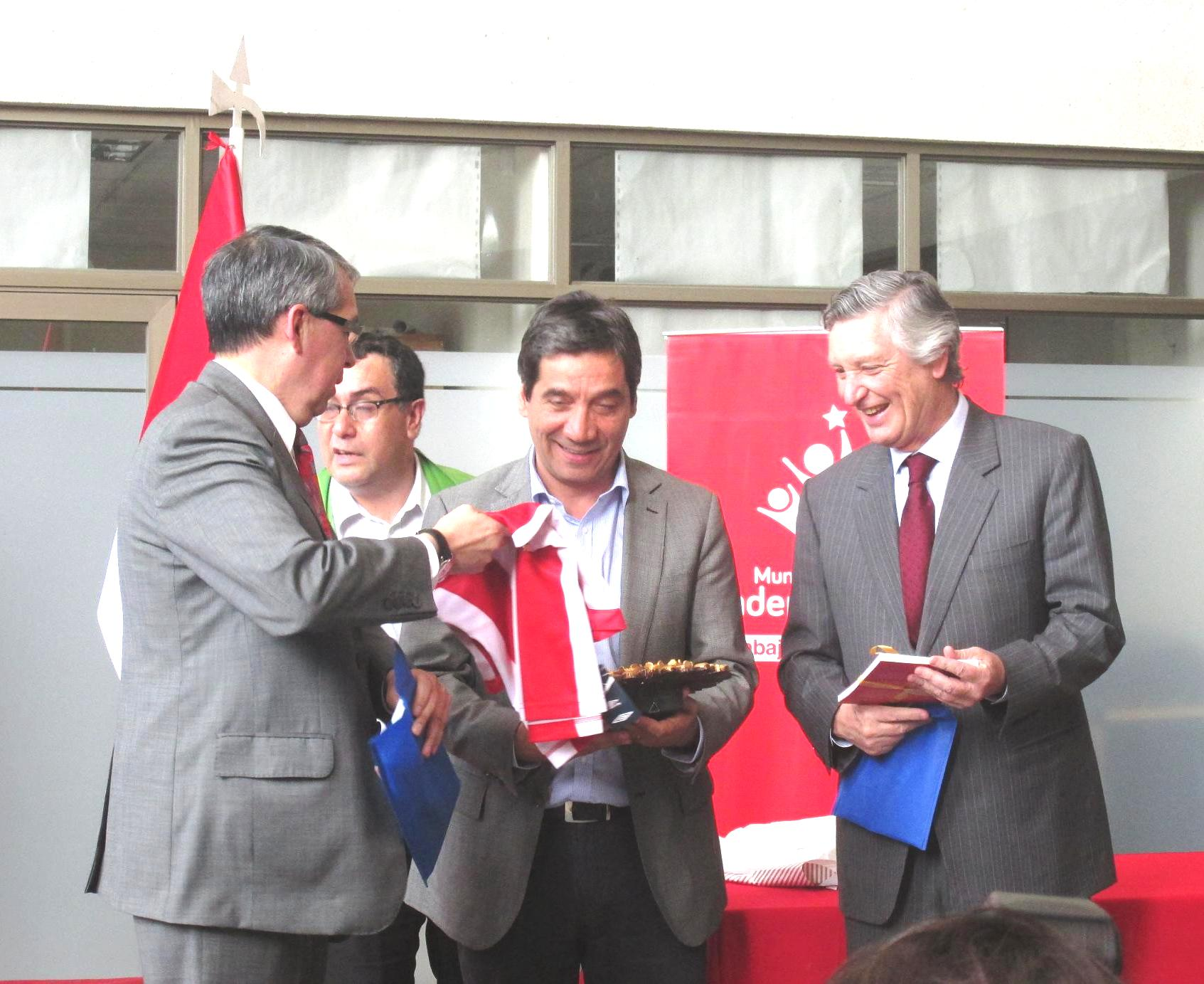

Mayor of Independencia
- In office 6 December 2012 – 1 July 2024
- Preceded by: Antonio Garrido Mardones
- Succeeded by: Carola Rivero Canales

Councilman of Independencia
- In office 6 December 1996 – 6 December 2004

Personal details
- Born: 9 July 1968 (age 58) Santiago, Chile
- Party: Socialist Party (1983−2019); Unir Movement (2020−present)
- Spouse: Valeska Naranjo
- Children: Three
- Parent(s): Oscar Álvaro Durán Galleguillos; María De La Luz Baronti Barella
- Education: Pontifical Catholic University of Valparaíso (BA)
- Profession: Philosopher

Gonzalo Andrés Durán Baronti (born 9 September 1968) is a Chilean politician who served as mayor of Independencia, a commune of Santiago, the capital of Chile.
