= Constituent Unity =

Chilean political coalition

Constituent Unity Unidad Constituyente
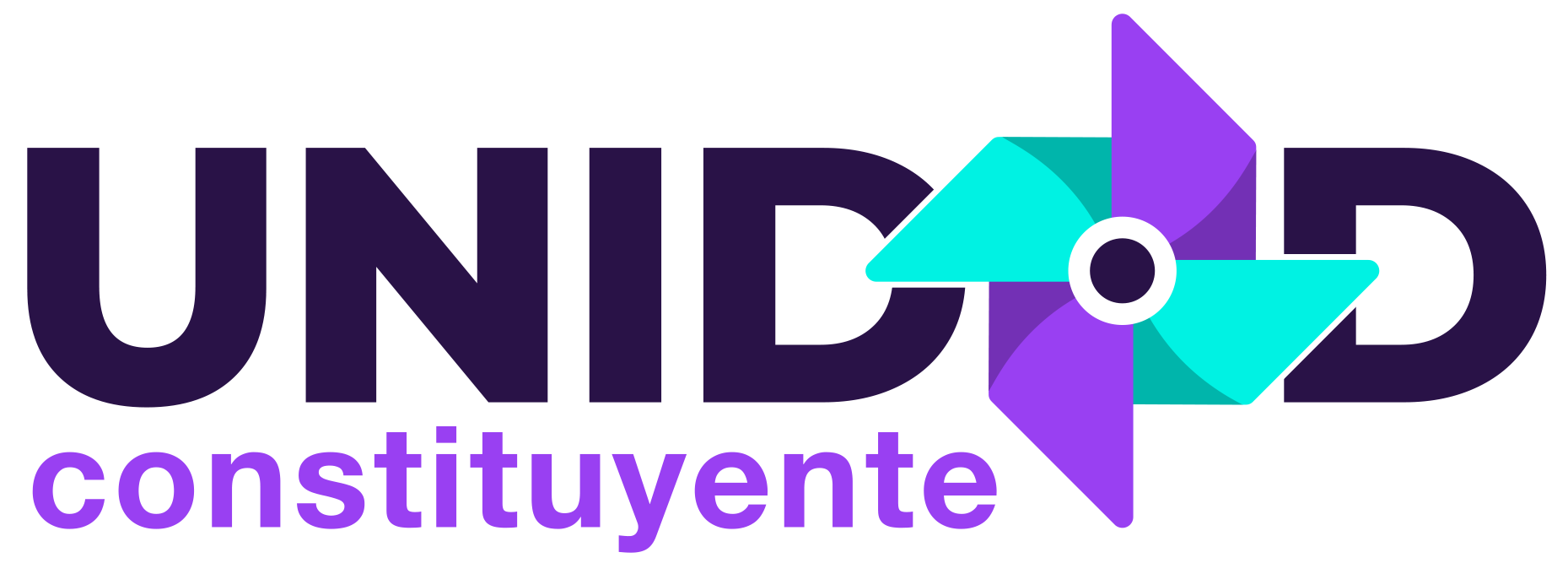
- Party leaders: Álvaro Elizalde (PS); Natalia Piergentili (PPD); Carlos Maldonado Curti (PR); Carmen Frei (PDC); María Ignacia Gómez (CIU); Patricio Morales (PL)
- Founded: 30 September 2020
- Dissolved: 23 August 2021
- Preceded by: Progressive Convergence
- Succeeded by: New Social Pact
- Headquarters: Santiago de Chile
- Ideology: Third Way; Factions: Social liberalism Social democracy Christian democracy Progressivism
- Political position: Centre to centre-left
- Member parties: Socialist Party; Party for Democracy; Radical Party; Christian Democratic Party; Citizens; Liberal Party; New Deal; Progressive Party
- Colours: Purple; Cyan

Election symbol
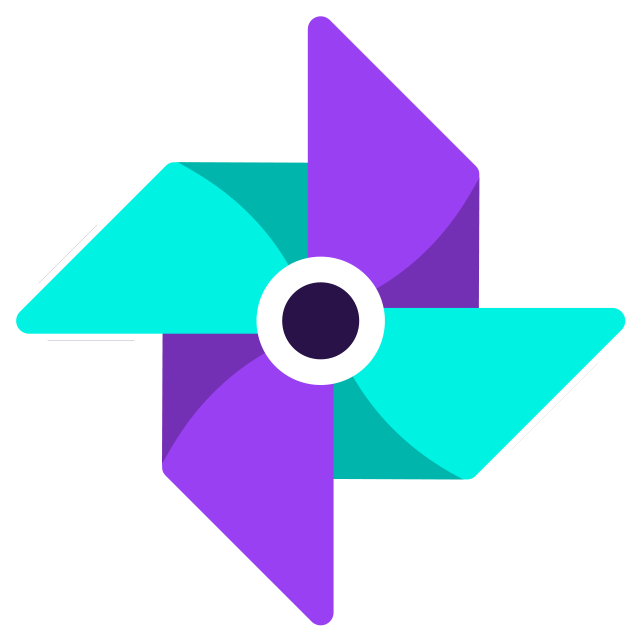

Constituent Unity (Spanish: Unidad Constituyente [uniˈða(ð) konstituˈʝente], UC) was a political alliance in Chile. It included the former members of the Concertation of Parties for Democracy (the Christian Democratic Party, Radical Party, Socialist Party, and Party for Democracy), plus the Progressive Party and Citizens.

This alliance was created in light of the municipal, regional and Constitutional Convention elections, held in May 2021. For the municipal elections, the alliance ran as two lists: Unity for the Approval (including the former members of Progressive Convergence: PS, PPD and PR) and Unity for Dignity (PDC, PRO and Citizens).

Due to its previous participation as a member of the Broad Front in the primaries for the municipal and regional election, the liberal party and the new deal movement couldn't participate as members of Constituent Unity in those elections. However, they joined Constituent Unity for the election of members for the Constitutional Convention under the name Lista del Apruebo (List of Approval).

On August 23, the last day to formalize the pacts and register candidacies for the general election, the Progressive Party was excluded from the candidacy pact due to the registration of the presidential candidacy of Marco Enríquez-Ominami; due to this, the other parties of the Constituent Unity registered the list called "New Social Pact".

== Symbols and logos ==
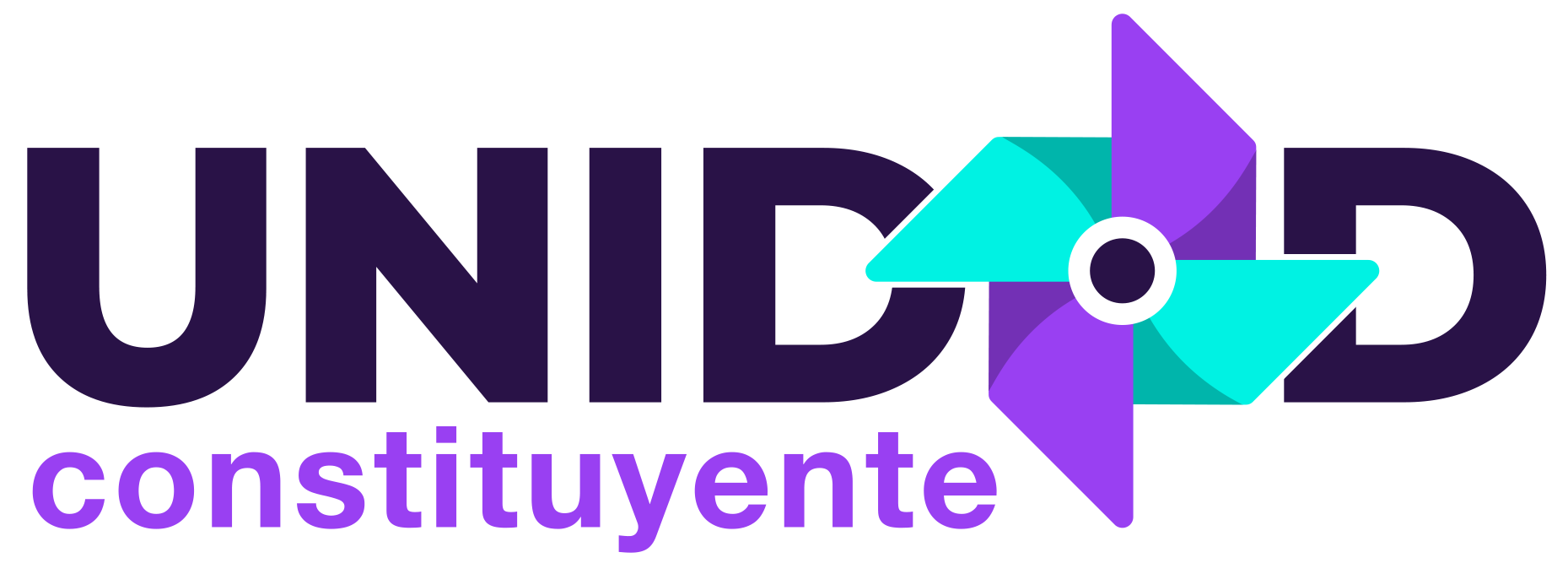
Constituent Unity logo
