= Santiago Metropolitan Region =

Region of Chile

Santiago Metropolitan Region Región Metropolitana de Santiago
- Region
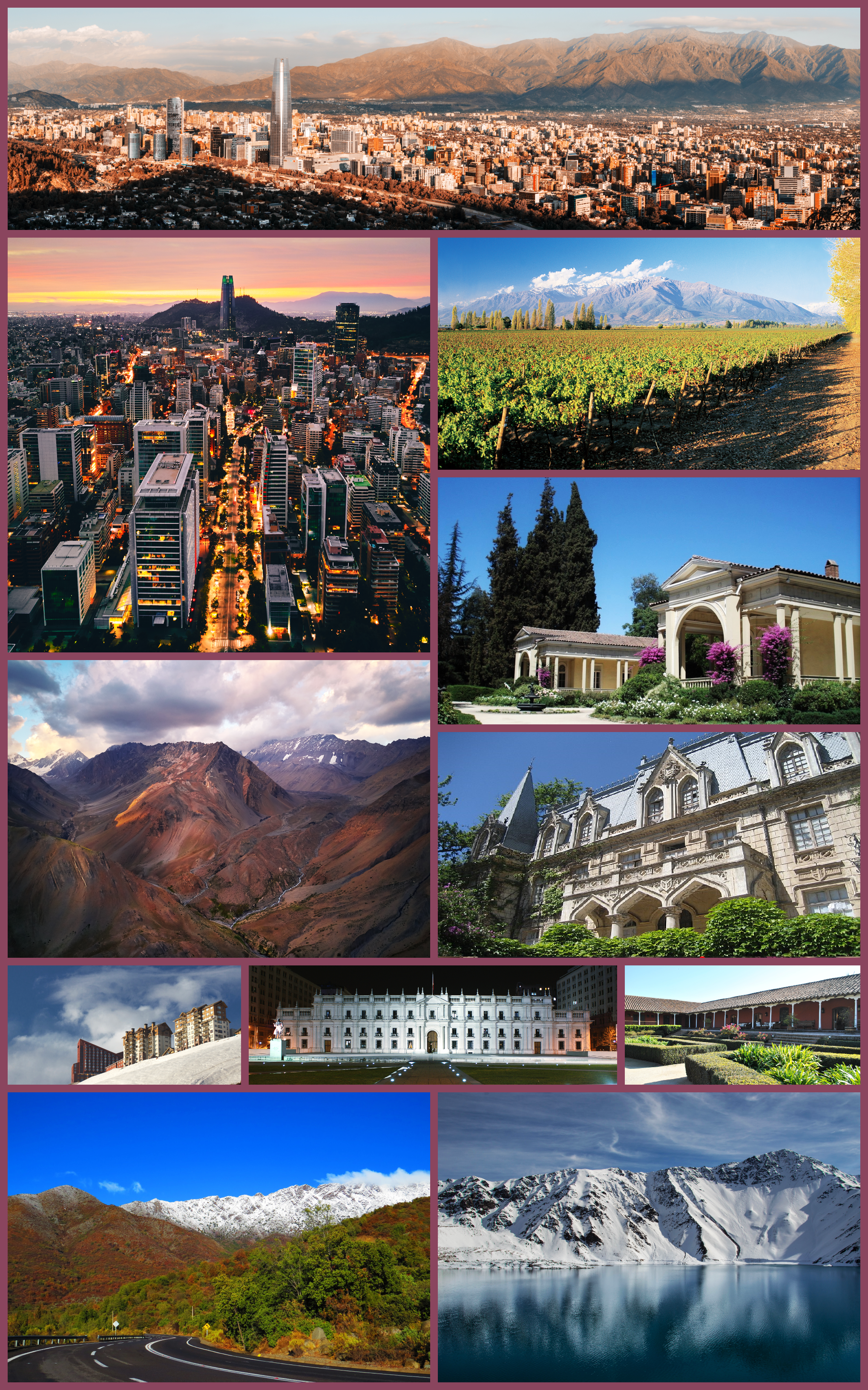
- Skyline of Santiago Metropolitan Region

- Flag Seal Coat of arms

- Map of Santiago Metropolitan Region
- Interactive map of Santiago Metropolitan Region
- Coordinates: 33°26′16″S 70°39′01″W
- Country: Chile
- Capital: Santiago
- Provinces: Santiago, Chacabuco, Cordillera, Maipo, Melipilla, Talagante

Government
  - Governor: Claudio Orrego
  - Presidencial Delegate: Germán Codina

Area
  - Total: 15,403.2 km^{2} (5,947.2 sq mi)
  - Rank: 15
- Highest elevation: 6,570 m (21,560 ft)

Population (2024)
  - Total: 7,400,741
  - Rank: 1st in Chile
  - Density: 480.468/km^{2} (1,244.41/sq mi)

GDP (nominal)
  - Total: US$128.800 billion
- ISO 3166 code: CL-RM
- HDI (2023): 0.908 very high
- Website: (in Spanish) Gobierno Regional Metropolitano de Santiago

Santiago Metropolitan Region (Spanish: Región Metropolitana de Santiago) is one of Chile's 16 first-order administrative divisions. It is the country's only landlocked administrative region and contains the nation's capital, Santiago. Most commercial and administrative centers are located in the region, including Chile's main international airport, Arturo Merino Benítez International Airport.

With an area of 15,403.2 km^{2} (5,947 sq mi) and population over seven million, it is Chile's most populated and most densely populated region. It is also the most developed subdivision in all of South America with a very high HDI of 0.908.

== History ==
The region's history of European influence started in 1542, a few days after Santiago was founded. When the Santiago cabildo was built, its function was to supervise the entire territory. Later, with the creation of the cities of La Serena and Concepción and the creation of their respective cabildos, its territorial reach was reduced.

On 30 August 1826, 8 provinces were created, with the Santiago Province being one of them, but it wasn't until 1980 that the Metropolitan Region was created.

== Geography ==
Metropolitana is Chile's only landlocked region and lies in the Intermediate Depression valley between the Chilean Coast Range and the Andes Mountains. Cerro San Cristóbal dominates the sprawling Santiago cityscape at a height of 880 m (2,887 ft) above sea level with city suburbs steadily climbing the foothills of the Andes to the east. The Tupungato stratovolcano, measures 6,570 m (21,555 ft) on the Argentine border, is one of South America's highest peaks.

The dominant drainage basin feeds into the Maipo River; its main tributaries are the Mapocho, Yeso and Colorado rivers.

Most of the region is made up of an extremely fertile, level prairie that the locals call la Depresión intermedia (Intermediate Depression). The terrain is known for its low elevation in relation to sea level and for being surrounded by hills, as well as emergent so-called island hills, such as Santa Lucía (an ancient extinct volcano), Blanco, and Renca, present today in the city of Santiago.

There is some occurrence of the endangered Chilean Wine Palm, Jubaea chilensis within the Santiago Province; this iconic tree of central Chile had a much larger range prehistorically, before the decimation of much of its habitat by the expanding human population.

The region mountainous parts of the region host various deposits of copper ore. To the north the mine of Los Bronces straddle the border with Valparaíso Region in the high Andes. Also in the high Andes but to the south along the border with O'Higgins Region lies the unexploited copper ore prospect of Catedral. To the west of the region at the foot of the Chilean Coastal Cordillera lies the mine Lo Aguirre which closed in 2000.

=== Climate ===
The climate of the Metropolitan Region is temperate Mediterranean cold, of the kind called continental. Precipitation is concentrated in the winter months, generally as snow over 900 m above sea level and, in colder years, over the city of Santiago. Winter tends to be cold with frequent frosts during which temperature drops below 0 °C (32 °F). The summer months are usually dry and hot. The Cordillera de la Costa acts as a climate screen and reduces marine influence, which makes the climate more continental. This situation becomes apparent when comparing precipitation from a coastal location such as Valparaíso (460 mm) with that of Santiago de Chile (360 mm).

The annual median precipitation reaches 367 mm on average. The annual median temperature comes out to 13.5 °C (56 °F), with a median high of 21 °C (70 °F) and a median low of 6 °C (43 °F) in urban areas. Rural areas tend to be colder, as temperature reaches −10 °C (14 °F) in the coldest months (July, August).

== Government ==
The region is divided into 6 provinces, which are themselves divided into 52 communes. Since 2021 the region is governed by the governor, who is elected by popular vote. The current governor is Claudio Orrego Larraín (Independent). The Presidential Delegate has been Germán Codina since 11 March 2026.

Commune	Province	Population (2024)
Alhué	Melipilla	7,768
Buin	Maipo	116,969
Calera de Tango	Maipo	25,491
Cerrillos	Santiago	85,041
Cerro Navia	Santiago	127,250
Colina	Chacabuco	173,293
Conchalí	Santiago	121,587
Curacaví	Melipilla	35,165
El Bosque	Santiago	155,257
El Monte	Talagante	37,497
Estación Central	Santiago	181,049
Huechuraba	Santiago	101,808
Independencia	Santiago	116,943
Isla de Maipo	Talagante	39,274
La Cisterna	Santiago	103,157
La Florida	Santiago	374,836
La Granja	Santiago	112,022
La Pintana	Santiago	175,421
La Reina	Santiago	89,870
Lampa	Chacabuco	145,160
Las Condes	Santiago	296,134
Lo Barnechea	Santiago	112,620
Lo Espejo	Santiago	87,295
Lo Prado	Santiago	91,290
Macul	Santiago	123,800
Maipú	Santiago	503,635
María Pinto	Melipilla	15,352
Melipilla	Melipilla	136,325
Ñuñoa	Santiago	241,467
Padre Hurtado	Talagante	81,243
Paine	Maipo	78,828
Pedro Aguirre Cerda	Santiago	96,062
Peñaflor	Talagante	94,402
Peñalolén	Santiago	236,478
Pirque	Cordillera	29,060
Providencia	Santiago	143,974
Pudahuel	Santiago	227,820
Puente Alto	Cordillera	568,086
Quilicura	Santiago	205,624
Quinta Normal	Santiago	129,351
Recoleta	Santiago	154,615
Renca	Santiago	143,622
San Bernardo	Maipo	306,371
San Joaquín	Santiago	95,602
San José de Maipo	Cordillera	17,441
San Miguel	Santiago	150,829
San Pedro	Melipilla	11,108
San Ramón	Santiago	76,002
Santiago	Santiago	438,856
Talagante	Talagante	76,429
Til-Til	Chacabuco	19,742
Vitacura	Santiago	86,420

== Demographics ==
Historical population
Year	Pop.	±% p.a.
1970	3,153,775	—
1982	4,318,097	+2.65%
1992	5,257,937	+1.99%
2002	6,061,185	+1.43%
2017	7,112,808	+1.07%
2024	7,400,741	+0.57%
Source: INE, Memoria Chilena

As of the 2024 census, the region has a population of 7,400,741, of which 48.4% are male and 51.6% are female, compared to the nationwide average of 48.5% and 51.5% respectively. People under 15 years old make up 17.3% of the population, and people over 65 years old make up 13.2%, compared to the nationwide average of 17.7% and 14.0% respectively. 96.2% of the population is urban and 3.8% is rural.

== Economy ==
The region's principal industries include manufacturing, services, retail, and financial services. The capital of Santiago serves as the country's administrative, industrial, commercial, financial and cultural center, producing 41.5% of Chile's gross domestic product, according to central bank estimates.

== Notable places ==
The Plaza de Armas, the central square in downtown Santiago, hosts the city's cathedral and city hall. Eight city blocks around the presidential palace, La Moneda, are where most ministries, services and commercial banks can be found. Vitacura and El Golf host most of the city's high-rise buildings and are also home to the Latin American headquarters of several United Nations organizations. Though Santiago's expansion has caused newer vineyards to move to more rural locations, many of the country's oldest wineries, built in the 19th century, have preserved cellars in the valley.

== Gallery ==
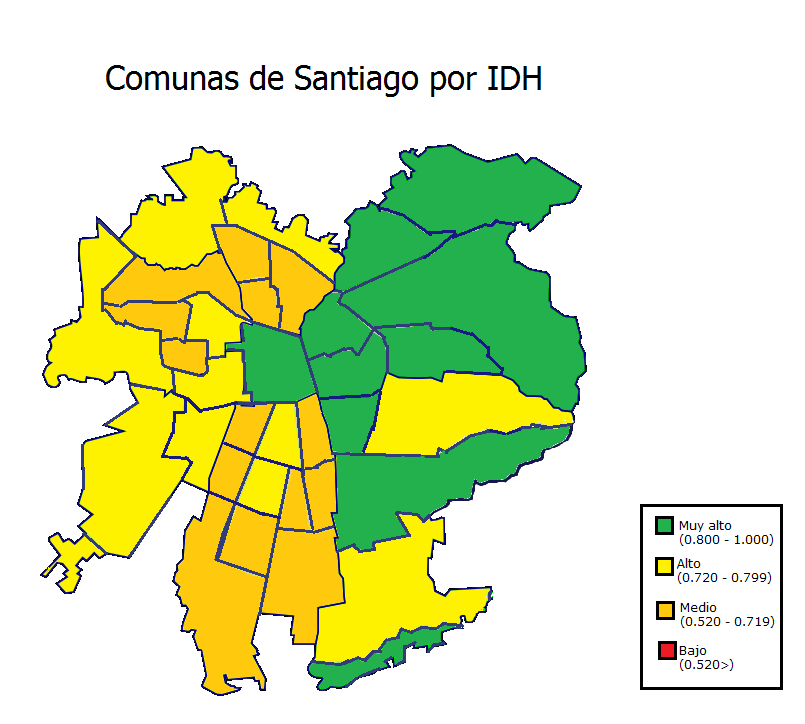
Metropolitan communes by Human Development Index

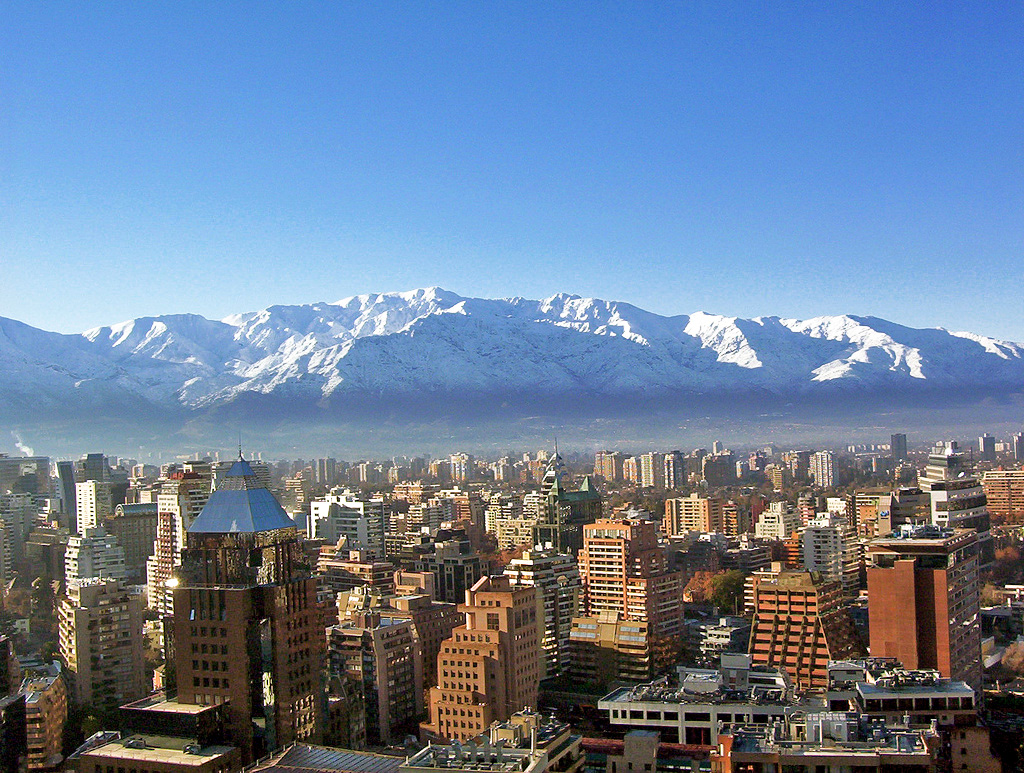
Santiago de Chile

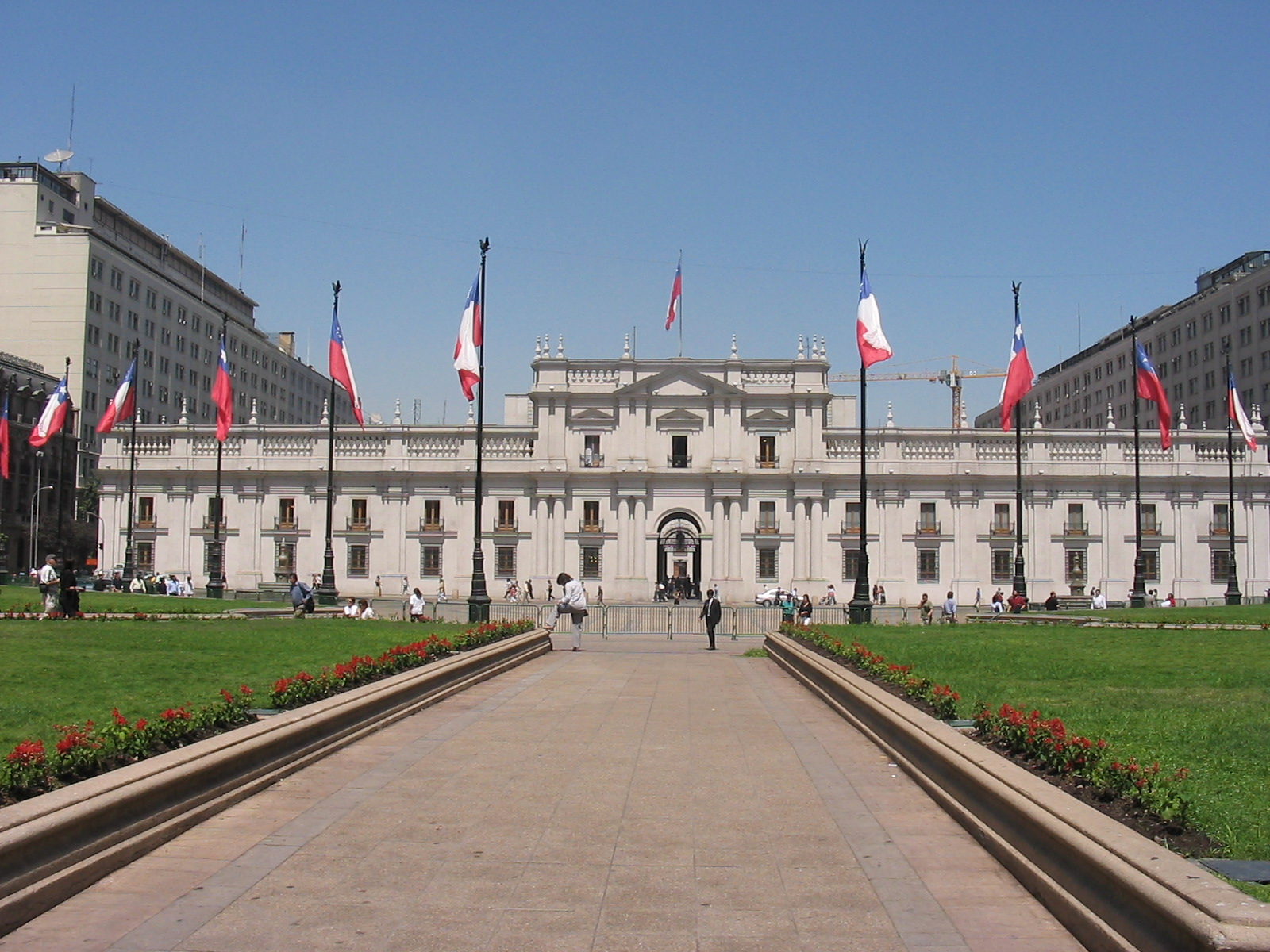
View of Palacio de La Moneda

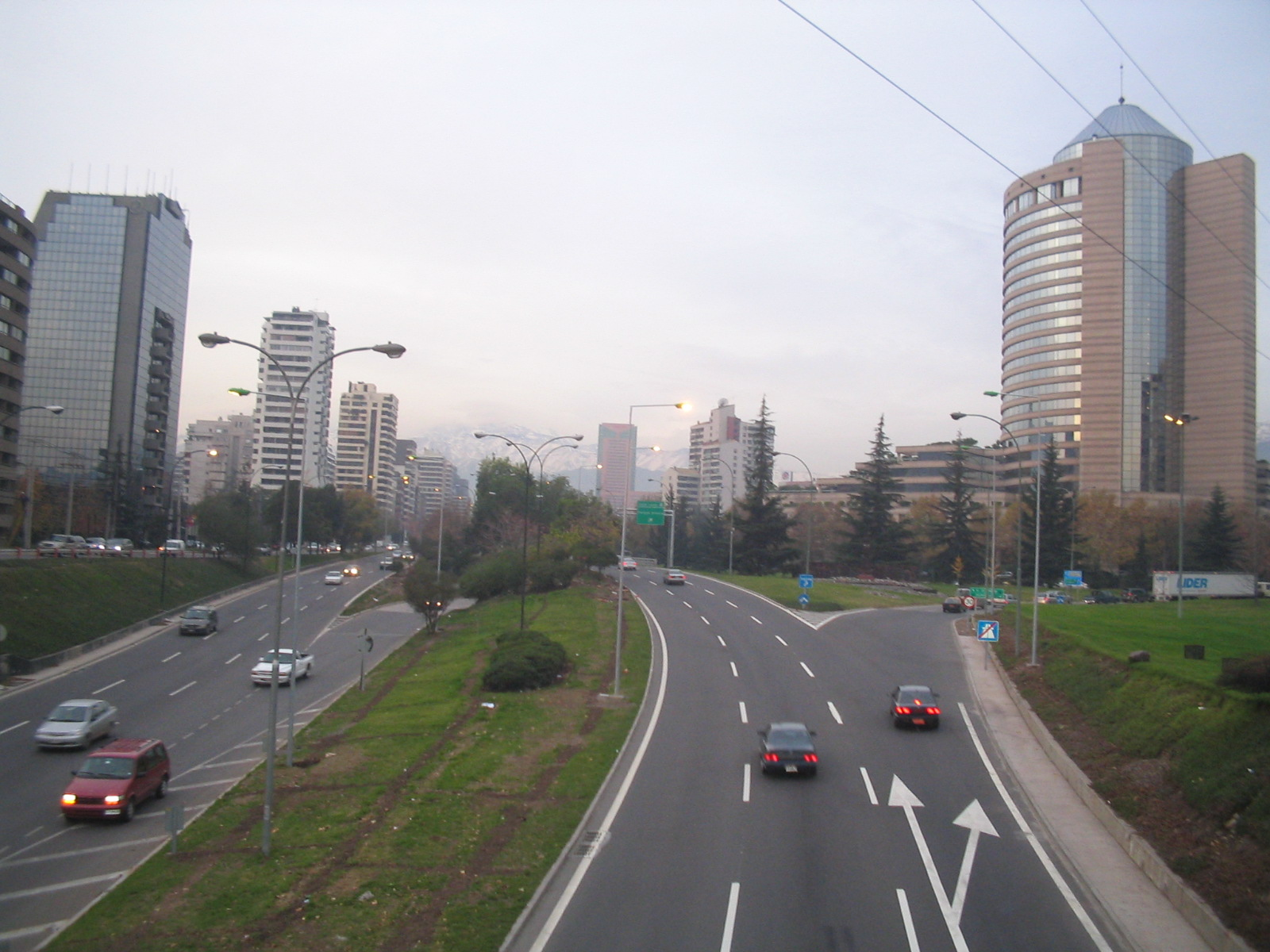
Kennedy Avenue, East Santiago with the Hyatt at the far right.

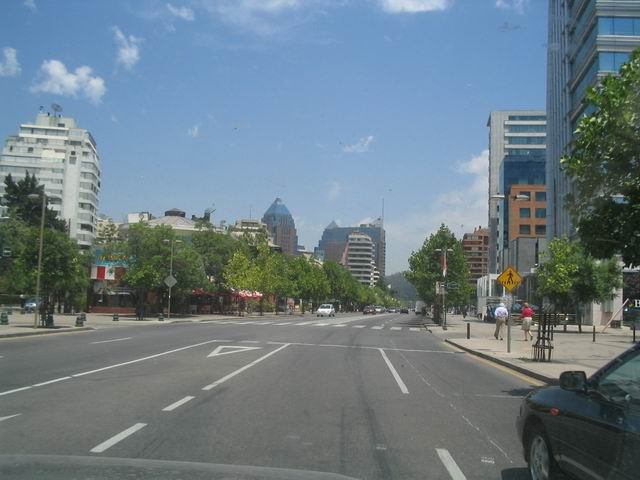
Isidora Goyenechea Avenue, Santiago financial district.

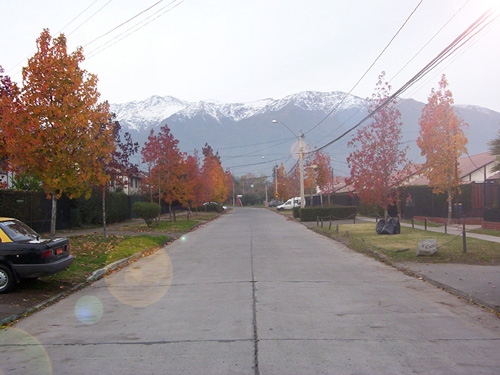
Typical middle-class neighbourhood

Santiago at night

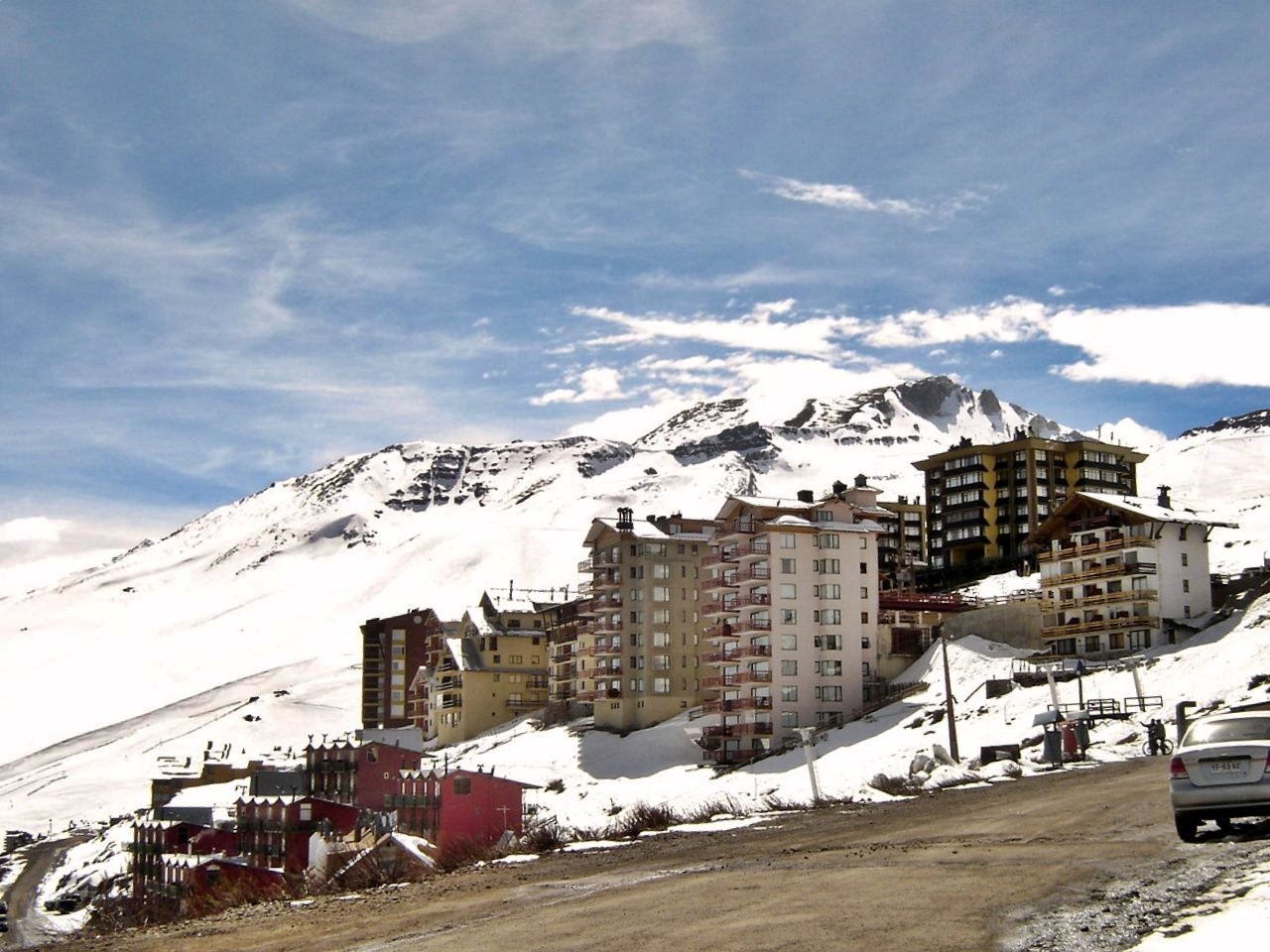
One of the region's ski centers

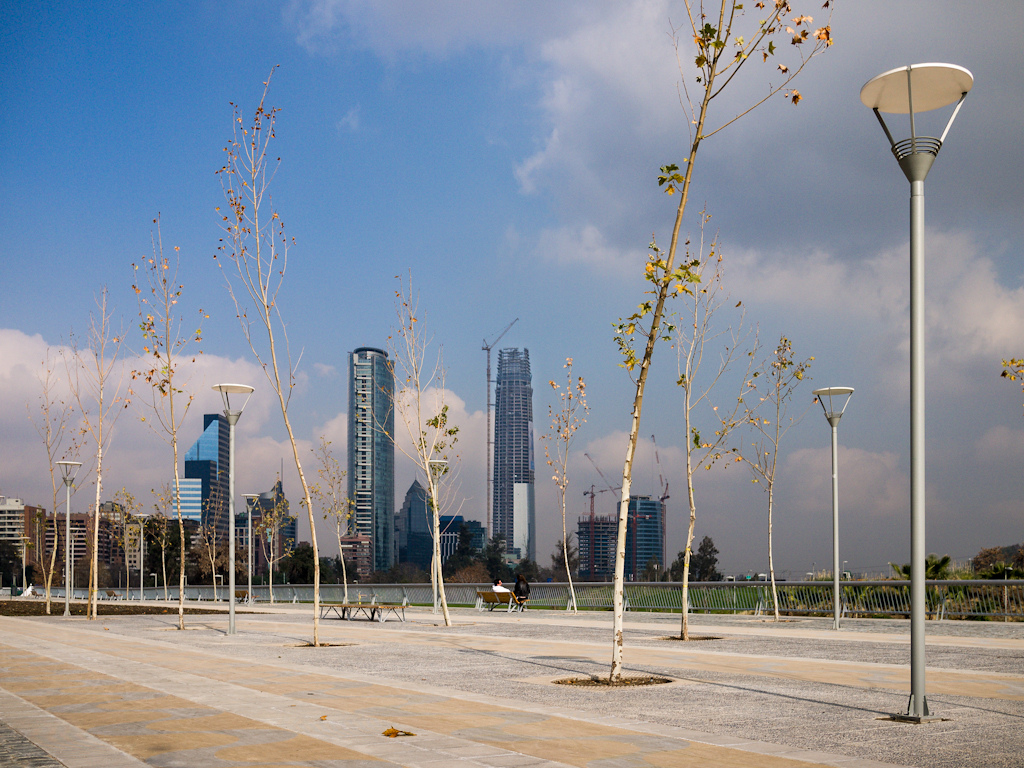
Sanhattan, Santiago's financial district with the Great Tower of Santiago.

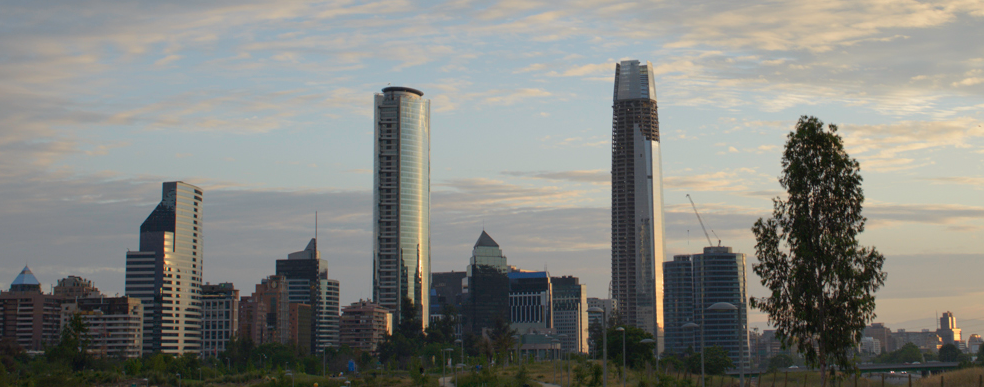
Santiago's Financial District with the Great Tower on the right and the Titanium on the left.

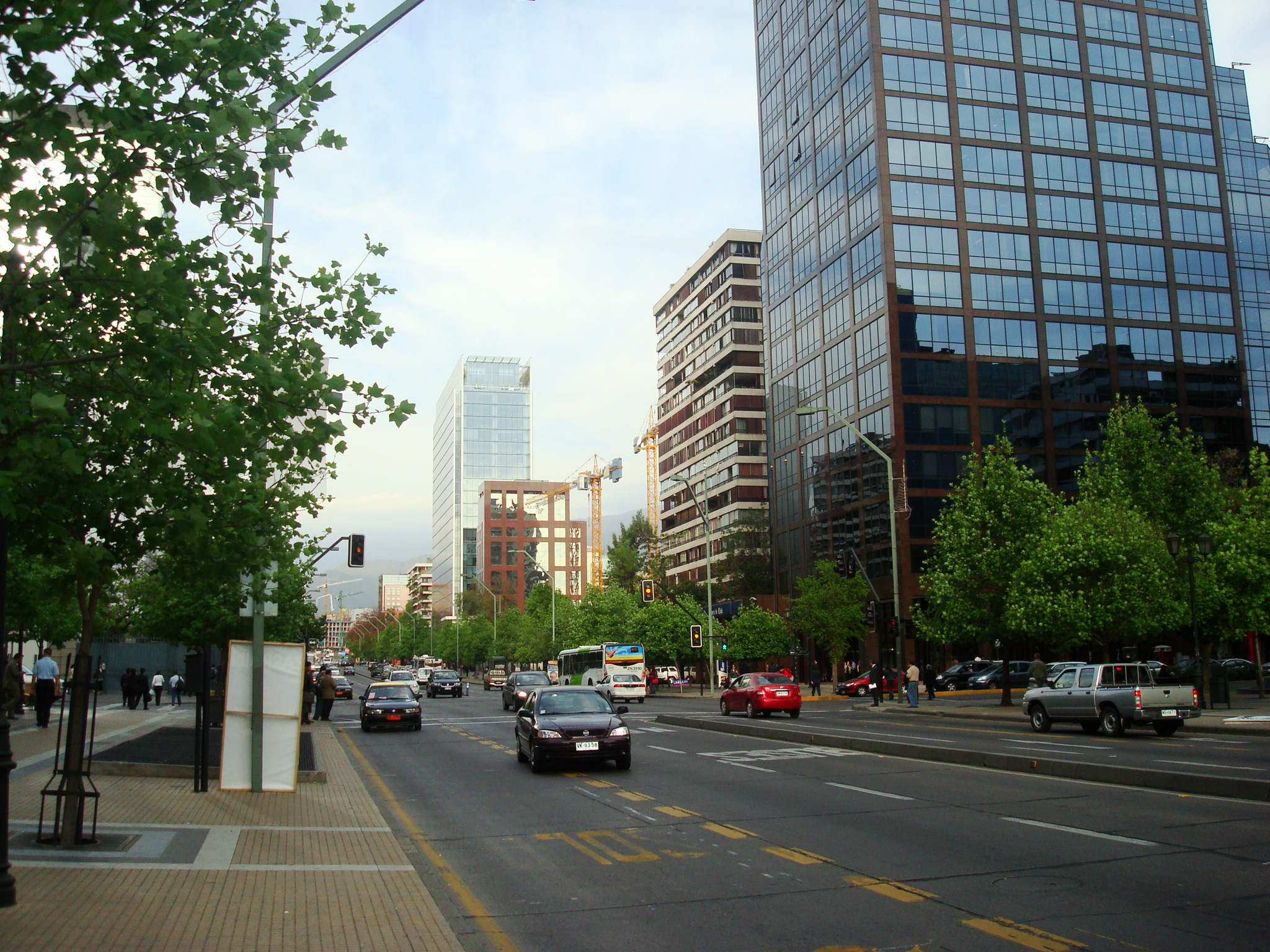
Apoquindo Avenue, the main avenue leading to the financial district.

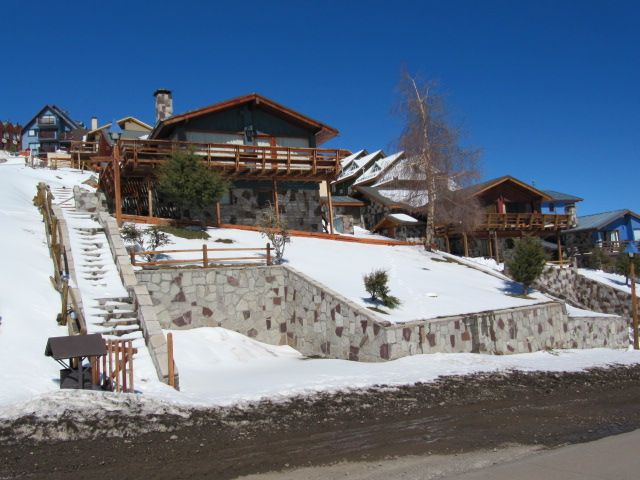
House in one of the region's ski centers.
