= District 13 (Chamber of Deputies of Chile) =

Electoral district of the Chamber of Deputies of Chile

- Distrito 13
- Electoral District for the Chamber of Deputies
- Location of District 13 within Chile
- Commune: List: El Bosque; La Cisterna; Lo Espejo; Pedro Aguirre Cerda; San Miguel; San Ramón
- Region: Santiago
- Population: 643,456 (2017)
- Electorate: 583,462 (2021)
- Area: 57 km^{2} (2020)

Current Electoral District
- Created: 2017
- Seats: 5 (2017–present)
- Deputies: List: Eduardo Durán (RN); Daniel Melo (PS); Cristhian Moreira (UDI); Lorena Pizarro (PC); Gael Yeomans (FA)

District 13 (Spanish: Distrito 13) is one of the 28 multi-member electoral districts of the Chamber of Deputies, the lower house of the National Congress, the national legislature of Chile. The district was created by the 2015 electoral reform and came into being at the following general election in 2017. It consists of the communes of El Bosque, La Cisterna, Lo Espejo, Pedro Aguirre Cerda, San Miguel and San Ramón in the region of Santiago. The district currently elects five of the 155 members of the Chamber of Deputies using the open party-list proportional representation electoral system. At the 2021 general election the district had 583,462 registered electors.

== Electoral system ==
District 13 currently elects five of the 155 members of the Chamber of Deputies using the open party-list proportional representation electoral system. Parties may form electoral pacts with each other to pool their votes and increase their chances of winning seats. However, the number of candidates nominated by an electoral pact may not exceed the maximum number of candidates that a single party may nominate. Seats are allocated using the D'Hondt method.

== Election results ==
=== Summary ===
Election	Apruebo Dignidad AD / FA			Green Ecologists PEV			Dignidad Ahora DA			New Social Pact NPS / NM			Democratic Convergence CD			Chile Vamos Podemos / Vamos			Party of the People PDG		
Election	Votes	%	Seats	Votes	%	Seats	Votes	%	Seats	Votes	%	Seats	Votes	%	Seats	Votes	%	Seats	Votes	%	Seats
2021	74,230	30.98%	2	24,757	10.33%	0	9,660	4.03%	0	26,572	11.09%	1				55,071	22.99%	2	21,726	9.07%	0
2017	48,781	19.91%	1							83,087	33.91%	2	20,069	8.19%	0	75,963	31.00%	2			

=== Detailed ===
==== 2021 ====
Results of the 2021 general election held on 21 November 2021:

Party		Pact	Party									Pact		
Party		Pact	Votes per commune						Total votes	%	Seats	Votes	%	Seats
Party		Pact	El Bosque	La Cis- terna	Lo Espejo	Pedro Aguirre Cerda	San Miguel	San Ramón	Total votes	%	Seats	Votes	%	Seats
Social Convergence	CS	Apruebo Dignidad	6,102	5,541	5,313	6,354	9,966	3,656	36,932	15.42%	1	74,230	30.98%	2
Communist Party of Chile	PC	Apruebo Dignidad	5,245	3,277	4,304	6,903	5,318	3,263	28,310	11.82%	1	74,230	30.98%	2
Comunes	COM	Apruebo Dignidad	1,507	770	894	1,245	957	871	6,244	2.61%	0	74,230	30.98%	2
Social Green Regionalist Federation	FREVS	Apruebo Dignidad	581	531	373	366	529	364	2,744	1.15%	0	74,230	30.98%	2
Independent Democratic Union	UDI	Chile Podemos +	6,519	6,443	2,565	3,552	7,130	3,001	29,210	12.19%	1	55,071	22.99%	2
National Renewal	RN	Chile Podemos +	5,225	3,891	2,869	4,052	6,857	2,967	25,861	10.79%	1	55,071	22.99%	2
Socialist Party of Chile	PS	New Social Pact	5,928	1,375	888	1,164	1,187	1,474	12,016	5.02%	1	26,572	11.09%	1
Christian Democratic Party	PDC	New Social Pact	790	1,026	599	660	1,112	531	4,718	1.97%	0	26,572	11.09%	1
Party for Democracy	PPD	New Social Pact	860	548	749	655	792	781	4,385	1.83%	0	26,572	11.09%	1
Liberal Party of Chile	PL	New Social Pact	544	496	271	457	1,067	235	3,070	1.28%	0	26,572	11.09%	1
Citizens	CIU	New Social Pact	560	297	365	380	430	351	2,383	0.99%	0	26,572	11.09%	1
Green Ecologist Party	PEV		5,537	3,836	4,053	4,046	4,172	3,113	24,757	10.33%	0	24,757	10.33%	0
Party of the People	PDG		5,597	2,811	3,602	3,471	3,009	3,236	21,726	9.07%	0	21,726	9.07%	0
United Centre	CU	United Independents	3,118	1,755	2,072	2,365	1,995	1,770	13,075	5.46%	0	13,075	5.46%	0
Equality Party	IGUAL	Dignidad Ahora	2,043	1,097	1,067	1,341	1,284	1,405	8,237	3.44%	0	9,660	4.03%	0
Humanist Party	PH	Dignidad Ahora	301	186	164	238	271	263	1,423	0.59%	0	9,660	4.03%	0
Revolutionary Workers Party	PTR		1,440	686	1,171	1,231	887	976	6,391	2.67%	0	6,391	2.67%	0
Patriotic Union	UPA		981	559	705	744	679	567	4,235	1.77%	0	4,235	1.77%	0
Progressive Party	PRO		920	520	622	585	682	531	3,860	1.61%	0	3,860	1.61%	0
Valid votes			53,798	35,645	32,646	39,809	48,324	29,355	239,577	100.00%	5	239,577	100.00%	5
Blank votes			3,869	1,914	2,496	2,746	2,418	2,416	15,859	5.83%				
Rejected votes – other			4,035	2,111	2,840	2,739	2,305	2,404	16,434	6.04%				
Total polled			61,702	39,670	37,982	45,294	53,047	34,175	271,870	46.60%				
Registered electors			135,969	81,931	88,815	91,490	105,216	80,041	583,462					
Turnout			45.38%	48.42%	42.77%	49.51%	50.42%	42.70%	46.60%					

The following candidates were elected: Eduardo Durán (RN), 14,574 votes; Daniel Melo (PS), 12,016 votes; Cristhian Moreira (UDI), 16,593 votes; Lorena Pizarro (PC), 20,858 votes; and Gael Yeomans (CS), 31,440 votes.

==== 2017 ====
Results of the 2017 general election held on 19 November 2017:

Party		Pact	Party									Pact		
Party		Pact	Votes per commune						Total votes	%	Seats	Votes	%	Seats
Party		Pact	El Bosque	La Cis- terna	Lo Espejo	Pedro Aguirre Cerda	San Miguel	San Ramón	Total votes	%	Seats	Votes	%	Seats
Communist Party of Chile	PC	Nueva Mayoría	4,444	2,774	6,224	9,588	6,337	3,445	32,812	13.39%	1	83,087	33.91%	2
Party for Democracy	PPD	Nueva Mayoría	7,704	5,677	4,128	3,290	2,850	5,488	29,137	11.89%	1	83,087	33.91%	2
Socialist Party of Chile	PS	Nueva Mayoría	9,221	2,349	1,803	1,881	2,493	3,391	21,138	8.63%	0	83,087	33.91%	2
National Renewal	RN	Chile Vamos	7,018	5,183	4,471	5,840	8,511	3,586	34,609	14.12%	1	75,963	31.00%	2
Independent Democratic Union	UDI	Chile Vamos	6,610	6,649	2,432	3,398	5,181	3,775	28,045	11.45%	1	75,963	31.00%	2
Evópoli	EVO	Chile Vamos	2,828	2,155	1,599	2,034	3,055	1,638	13,309	5.43%	0	75,963	31.00%	2
Democratic Revolution	RD	Broad Front	3,582	3,080	2,790	3,757	5,745	2,203	21,157	8.63%	1	48,781	19.91%	1
Green Ecologist Party	PEV	Broad Front	4,285	3,647	2,852	3,683	4,150	2,465	21,082	8.60%	0	48,781	19.91%	1
Equality Party	IGUAL	Broad Front	1,239	700	1,610	1,184	1,015	794	6,542	2.67%	0	48,781	19.91%	1
Christian Democratic Party	PDC	Democratic Convergence	3,621	2,693	3,460	3,694	3,785	2,816	20,069	8.19%	0	20,069	8.19%	0
Progressive Party	PRO	All Over Chile	3,298	1,478	1,978	2,141	1,510	1,942	12,347	5.04%	0	12,347	5.04%	0
Patriotic Union	UPA		1,096	533	961	850	565	773	4,778	1.95%	0	4,778	1.95%	0
Valid votes			54,946	36,918	34,308	41,340	45,197	32,316	245,025	100.00%	5	245,025	100.00%	5
Blank votes			3,312	1,856	2,472	2,288	1,949	2,525	14,402	5.20%				
Rejected votes – other			3,970	2,436	2,942	3,040	2,507	2,643	17,538	6.33%				
Total polled			62,228	41,210	39,722	46,668	49,653	37,484	276,965	46.56%				
Registered electors			139,338	83,686	93,275	95,614	99,938	82,960	594,811					
Turnout			44.66%	49.24%	42.59%	48.81%	49.68%	45.18%	46.56%					

The following candidates were elected: Eduardo Durán (RN), 19,744 votes; Tucapel Jiménez (PPD), 22,551 votes; Cristhian Moreira (UDI), 18,125 votes; Guillermo Teillier (PC), 28,798 votes; and Gael Yeomans (RD), 13,721 votes.
