= Gael Yeomans =

Chilean politician and lawyer

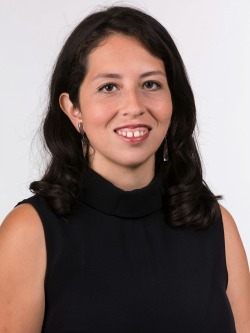

Member of the Chamber of Deputies
- Incumbent
- Assumed office 11 March 2018
- Constituency: District 13

Personal details
- Born: Gael Fernanda Yeomans Araya; 4 December 1988 (age 37) Rancagua, Chile
- Party: Social Convergence (2019–present)
- Other political affiliations: Libertarian Left (2011-2019)
- Education: University of Chile
- Occupation: Lawyer, politician
- Website: www.gaelyeomans.cl

Gael Fernanda Yeomans Araya (born 4 December 1988) is a Chilean lawyer and politician. She was secretary general of the Libertarian Left movement (Spanish: Izquierda Libertaria).

She was elected to the Chamber of Deputies for District 13 in 2017, and again in 2019.

== Biography ==
She was born in Rancagua on 4 December 1988. She is the daughter of Esteban Yeomans Solís and Rosana Araya Rodríguez.

She completed her primary education at Colegio Javiera Carrera in Rancagua in 2002. She later completed her secondary education at the Instituto Sagrado Corazón in the same city, graduating in 2006.

She subsequently entered the School of Law of the University of Chile to study Law. In 2018, she obtained a licentiate degree in Legal and Social Sciences with a thesis titled Comparative analysis of the ways in which citizen participation is contemplated in constitutional reform mechanisms in Latin America. She was admitted to practice law on 29 March 2019.

== Political career ==
She began her political activity during her secondary school years as a member of the Communist Youth of Chile. In 2012, she participated in the formation of the Frente de Estudiantes Libertarios (FEL) and was also a member of the Colectivo Arrebol.

In early 2017, she took part in the founding of the Broad Front and served as a national leader of the coalition as Secretary General of Izquierda Libertaria.

In the parliamentary elections held in November 2017, she was elected Deputy for the 13th District of the Metropolitan Region of Santiago—comprising the communes of El Bosque, La Cisterna, Lo Espejo, Pedro Aguirre Cerda, San Miguel, and San Ramón—representing Democratic Revolution for the 2018–2022 term. She obtained 13,721 votes, equivalent to 5.60% of the valid votes cast.

On 15 April 2019, she submitted her resignation from Democratic Revolution to the Electoral Service of Chile. In May of the same year, she was elected President of the Social Convergence party.

In August 2021, she ran for re-election in the same district for the 2022–2026 term. In November 2021, she was re-elected representing Convergence Social as part of the Apruebo Dignidad pact, obtaining 31,440 votes, corresponding to 13.12% of the valid votes cast.

Since July 2024, she has been a member of the Frente Amplio party. On 7 April 2025, she was appointed campaign manager of the Frente Amplio presidential candidate Gonzalo Winter.
