= Eduardo Durán =

Chilean politician

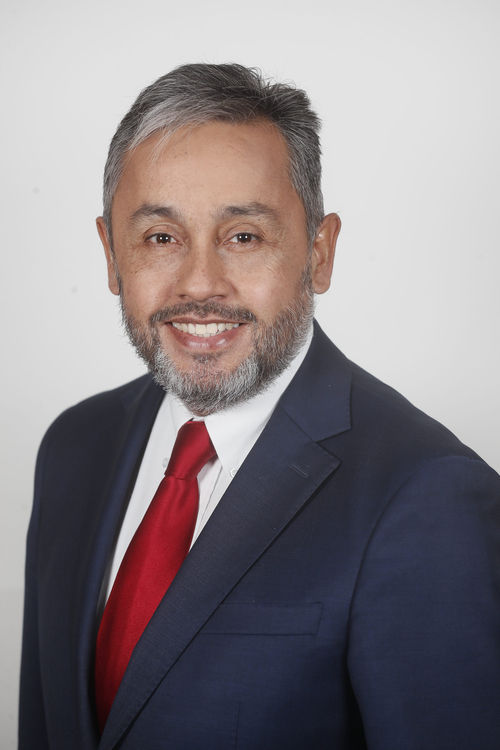

Member of the Chamber of Deputies
- Incumbent
- Assumed office 11 March 2018
- Constituency: District 13

Personal details
- Born: 1 January 1972 (age 54) Santiago, Chile
- Party: National Renewal
- Spouse: Marjorie Vásquez
- Children: Two
- Parent(s): Eduardo Durán Castro; Raquel Salinas
- Education: University of Santiago; University of Chile (MBA); Tulane University (MBA); Georgetown University (MD)
- Occupation: Politician
- Profession: Civil Engineer; Economist

Eduardo Alfredo Durán Salinas (born 1 January 1972) is a Chilean civil engineer, economist, politician, and Renovación Nacional (RN) member. He served as governor of the Province of Ñuble in the period from 11 March 2010, to 11 March 2014, under the first presidency of Sebastián Piñera.

Currently he is a representative for district No. 13, made up of the communes of El Bosque, La Cisterna, Lo Espejo, Pedro Aguirre Cerda, San Miguel and San Ramón, which are part of Greater Santiago. He is also one of the members of the so-called "evangelical caucus."

== Biography ==
He is the son of Eduardo Durán Castro, former bishop of the First Methodist Pentecostal Church Jotabeche 40, and Raquel Salinas Caris. In 2006 he was chosen as one of the "100 Young Leaders of the Country" by the newspaper El Mercurio and the Adolfo Ibáñez University. He is a member of the Chilean Bible Society and the Chilean Society of Public Policies.

== Studies and professional career ==
He completed his secondary studies at the Instituto Nacional, from which he graduated in 1988. He studied civil engineering in civil works at the University of Santiago, where he finished his studies in 1996. He has two postgraduate degrees, one jointly from the University of Chile and Tulane University, where he obtained a Master in Business Administration degree, and another from Georgetown University, where he obtained a Master in Applied Economics degree.

He was director of Alfaomega Ingeniería y Construcción Ltda., Inmobiliaria Alfaomega Ltda. and Embotelladora Southern Waters Ltda.

== Controversies ==
The deputy intervened during the vote on the Gender identity law in the Chamber of Deputies on September 12, 2018. On the occasion, he criticized the bill, pointing out that "in terms of pensions, men could decide that they are women to retire early", which earned him criticism from other parliamentarians and citizens on social networks.

He has also been questioned about his relationship with the evangelical bishop, Eduardo Durán Castro, whose son he is, from whom he received an "allowance" as a deputy, and who has been investigated by the Chilean Investigative Police and the Internal Revenue Service due to accusations of money laundering and tax crimes within the evangelical church.
