= Cristhian Moreira =

Chilean politician (born 1961)

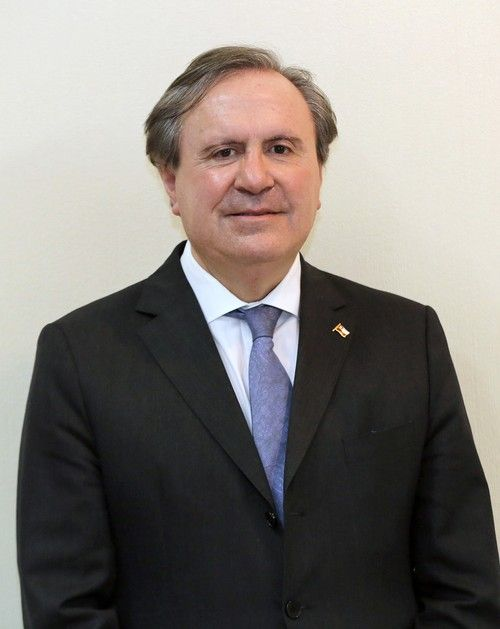

Member of the Chamber of Deputies of Chile
- In office 11 March 2018 – 11 March 2026
- Constituency: District 13

Personal details
- Born: 5 September 1961 (age 64) Santiago, Chile
- Party: Independent Democratic Union (UDI)
- Spouse: Patricia Hoffmann
- Children: Two
- Parent(s): Julio César Moreira; Marta Barros
- Relatives: Iván Moreira (brother)
- Occupation: Politician

Cristhian Patricio Moreira Barros (Santiago de Chile, September 5, 1961) is a Chilean property broker and politician from the Independent Democratic Union (UDI) party. He was a councilor for the commune of San Ramón between 2004 and 2008, and then was a councilor for the commune of La Cisterna between 2008 and 2012. In 2017 he was elected as a deputy for district 13 of the Metropolitan Region.

== Biography ==
Son of Julio César Moreira Cabrera and Marta Liliana Barros Alemparte. He is the brother of former deputy and current senator Iván Moreira Barros.

He completed his secondary studies at the Liceo Luis Alberto Barrera, in Punta Arenas. He studied law at the Bolivarian University of Chile.

== Political career ==
His political career began in the 2004 municipal elections where he was elected Councilor for the San Ramón commune, representing the Independent Democratic Union Party, for the 2004-2008 period. He obtained 4,413 votes corresponding to 10.7% of the total votes cast.

In the 2008 municipal elections, he was elected Councilor for the commune of La Cisterna, for the period 2008–2012. He obtained 6,718 votes corresponding to 17.22% of the total validly cast.

In 2013, he ran for the Regional Council for the Metropolitan Region of Santiago for the period 2014 and 2018. He obtained 30,373 votes, equivalent to 10.37% of the votes validly cast, failing to be elected, being the third majority.

In the 2017 parliamentary elections, he was elected deputy for District 13, Santiago Metropolitan Region, communes of El Bosque, La Cisterna, Lo Espejo, Pedro Aguirre Cerda, San Miguel, and San Ramón, for the period 2018–2022, in representation of the Independent Democratic Union Party, and as part of the Chile Vamos pact. He obtained 18,127 votes corresponding to 7.40% of the total votes validly cast.
