= Apruebo Dignidad =

Chilean electoral alliance

Approve Dignity Apruebo Dignidad
- Abbreviation: AD
- Leader: Gabriel Boric
- Party presidents: Diego Ibáñez (CS); Guillermo Teillier (PCCh); Juan Ignacio Latorre (RD); Flavia Torrealba (FREVS); Marco Velarde (Comunes); Tomás Hirsch (AH)
- Founders: Daniel Jadue; Gabriel Boric
- Founded: 11 January 2021; 4 years ago
- Dissolved: 2023
- Preceded by: Pliego Popular
- Succeeded by: Unity for Chile
- Headquarters: Santiago de Chile
- Think tank: Constituent Observatory Apruebo Dignidad
- Youth wing: Jóvenes Apruebo Dignidad
- Women's wing: Feministas Apruebo Dignidad
- Ideology: Democratic socialism Anti-neoliberalism; Factions: Social democracy Socialism of the 21st century Progressivism; Communism
- Political position: Left-wing; Factions: Far-left
- National affiliation: Government Alliance
- Coalition members: Broad Front • Democratic Revolution • Social Convergence • Commons • Unir Movement; Chile Digno • Communist Party • FREVS • Humanist Action • Christian Left
- Colours: Light red

Website
- apruebo-dignidad.cl

Apruebo Dignidad ([aˈpɾweβo ðiɣniˈðað]; in English, Approve Dignity, AD) was a democratic socialist Chilean electoral coalition officially created on 11 January 2021, by the Broad Front and Chile Digno in preparation for the Constitutional Convention election.

== History ==
The Apruebo Dignidad pact has its origins in the attempt to reunite the left into a large conglomerate. In the midst of the pandemic, there were various attempts to seek unity in the opposition. One of them was Popular Sheet (Spanish: Pliego Popular), a platform that led left-wing political parties and movements with the intention of pushing left-of-centre economic proposals in Congress.

Its members include the Broad Front, Chile Digno, Social Unity Table, Community for Dignity, among other organizations. On 5 February 2021, the central principals of the coalition for the drafting of the New Constitution were defined. This event was attended by social and political figures such as Beatriz Sánchez, Fernando Atria, Bárbara Figueroa, Emilia Schneider, Bastián Bodenhöfer, Patricia López, Tatiana Urrutia, Marcos Barraza, Bárbara Sepúlveda Hales, and others.

After successful constituent elections, the parties confirmed a presidential primary and the formalization of the electoral coalition on 19 May, amid failed talks with the Socialist Party. These primaries summon the standard-bearer and current mayor of Recoleta, Daniel Jadue, who is supported by Chile Digno composed of the Communist Party and the Social Green Regionalist Federation, and also the Equality Party. On the other side was deputy Gabriel Boric, who was supported by the Broad Front as a whole.

On 18 July 2021, the primaries of Apruebo Dignidad were held, giving as the winner the militant of Social Convergence, Gabriel Boric, who represented the coalition in the presidential elections in November. Also, in the midst of talks, the possibility of the conglomerate forming a single list for the parliamentary elections was considered.

On Thursday, 12 August, the conglomerate launched the Constituent Observatory Apruebo Dignidad, a think tank that brings together four study centers of parties and movements that are members of the coalition: Saberes Colectivos (Broad Front), Rumbo Colectivo (Democratic Revolution), La Casa Común (Common Force) and the Alejandro Lipschutz Institute of Sciences (Communist Party). The main objective of the project is the need to forge links between the Constitutional Convention and civil society for the monitoring and lifting of constitutional proposals, in addition to strengthening relations between the parties and movements that make up Apruebo Dignidad.

On 11 August, the parliamentary list of Apruebo Dignidad was formalized, composed of the parties and movements of the conglomerate that have parliamentary representation (RD, CS, Comunes, Unir, PC, FREVS, AH). The objective of the bench was to improve parliamentary coordination in debates in Congress in the future; such as the 40-hour law, the tax on the super rich, among others. Likewise, the event ratified the support for Gabriel Boric's candidacy for the presidency. The Equality Party decided not to support Boric and raise a parallel parliamentary list with the Humanist Party called Dignidad Ahora.

=== 2021 presidential election ===
Boric obtained 25.83% of the votes in the first round of the presidential election, securing his place in a run-off against José Antonio Kast of the Christian Social Front, who received 27.91% of the preferences. In the second round, that took place on 19 December, he won 55.87% of the votes, becoming president-elect of Chile. He was sworn in on 11 March 2022.

On 24 September 2022, through a statement it was reported that the Common Force political movement became part of the Social Convergence party.

In September 2023, the main leaders of Apruebo Dignidad acknowledged that the coalition had not been functioning for months; this coincided with the reflection process within the Broad Front over a possible merger between all its parties.

== Composition ==
Party	Abbr.	President	Ideology	Coalition
Communist Party of Chile; Partido Comunista de Chile	PCCh	Guillermo Teillier	Communism	Chile Digno
Social Green Regionalist Federation; Federación Regionalista Verde Social	FREVS	Flavia Torrealba	Regionalism; Green politics	Chile Digno
Humanist Action; Acción Humanista	AH	Tomás Hirsch	New humanism Social ecology	Chile Digno
Christian Left of Chile; Izquierda Cristiana de Chile	IC	Fernando Astudillo	Christian left Christian socialism	Chile Digno
Democratic Revolution; Revolución Democrática	RD	Juan Ignacio Latorre	Social democracy Democratic socialism	Broad Front
Social Convergence; Convergencia Social	CS	Diego Ibáñez	Libertarian socialism Autonomism	Broad Front
Commons; Comunes	Comunes	Marco Velarde	Socialism of the 21st century Autonomism	Broad Front
Unite Movement; Movimiento Unir	UNIR	Marcelo Díaz Díaz	Progressivism; Social democracy	Broad Front

=== Former members ===
Party	Abbr.	Leader	Ideology	Membership	Coalition
Equality Party; Partido Igualdad	PI	Guillermo González	Socialism of the 21st century Marxism	until August 2021	Chile Digno (Jun–Aug 2021)
Libertarian Left; Izquierda Libertaria	IL	none	Left-libertarianism; Libertarian socialism	until August 2021	Chile Digno (2020-)
Common Force; Fuerza Común	FC	Fernando Atria	Progressivism; Social democracy	until September 2022	Broad Front (2017-2022)

== Election results ==
=== Presidential elections ===
Election year	Candidate	1st Round		2nd Round		Results
Election year	Candidate	# Votes	% Votes	# Votes	% Votes	Results
2021	Gabriel Boric (CS)	1,815,024	25.82	4,620,890	55.87	Elected

=== Constitutional Convention ===
Election	Leader	Votes	%	Seats	+/–	Rank	Majority
2021	Daniel Jadue; Gabriel Boric	1,069,225	18.74	28 / 155	New	2nd	AD+LdP+LdA+INN

=== Congress election ===
Election year	Chamber of Deputies			Senate			Majority
Election year	# Votes	% Votes	Seats	# Votes	% Votes	Seats	Majority
2021	1,325,232	20.94%	37 / 155	911,716	19.57%	5 / 50	AD+LdP+LdA+INN
