= Common Force =

Chilean political party

Common Force Fuerza Común
- President: Fernando Atria
- Secretary-General: Irene del Real
- Vice President: Margarita Fernández
- Founded: 1 February 2020
- Dissolved: 24 September 2022
- Split from: Socialist Party of Chile
- Merged into: Social Convergence
- Headquarters: San Pío X 2390, Providencia, Santiago
- Think tank: The Common House
- Student wing: Student Front FC
- Women's wing: Feminist Front FC
- Coalition: Broad Front
- Ideology: Progressivism; Social democracy Feminism; Plurinationalism; Participatory democracy
- Political position: Centre-left to left-wing
- National affiliation: Apruebo Dignidad; Broad Front
- Colours: Orange
- Slogan: «For a new Chile» (Spanish: «Por un nuevo Chile»)

Website
- fuerzacomun.cl

Common Force (Spanish: Fuerza Común) was a Chilean centre-left to left-wing political party, founded in 2020 by former members of the Socialist Party of Chile and independent organisations. In August 2020, it became part of the Broad Front, a left-wing political coalition.

On September 24, 2022, through a statement, it was reported that the Common Force political movement became part of the Social Convergence party .

== See also ==
List of political parties in Chile
