= Chile Digno =

Worthy Chile Chile Digno
- Leader: Daniel Jadue
- Party leaders: Guillermo Teillier (PC); Flavia Torrealba (FREVS); Tomás Hirsch (AH)
- Founded: 11 May 2019 (Unity for Change); 22 November 2020 (Chile Digno)
- Dissolved: 4 July 2022
- Preceded by: New Majority; Green Regionalist Coalition
- Headquarters: Santiago de Chile
- Ideology: Democratic socialism; Communism; Left-wing populism; Progressivism; Universal humanism; Socialism of the 21st century
- Political position: Left-wing to far-left
- National affiliation: Apruebo Dignidad
- Member parties: Communist Party; FREVS; Libertarian Left; Humanist Action; Christian Left
- Colours: Red; Green

Website
- apruebochiledigno.cl

Chile Digno (Spanish for "Worthy Chile") was a Chilean political coalition of left-wing parties with a communist, ecologist, regionalist and humanist ideology.

The political alliance was created under the name Unity for Change after the victory of the conservative coalition Chile Vamos in the 2017 general election.

== Composition ==
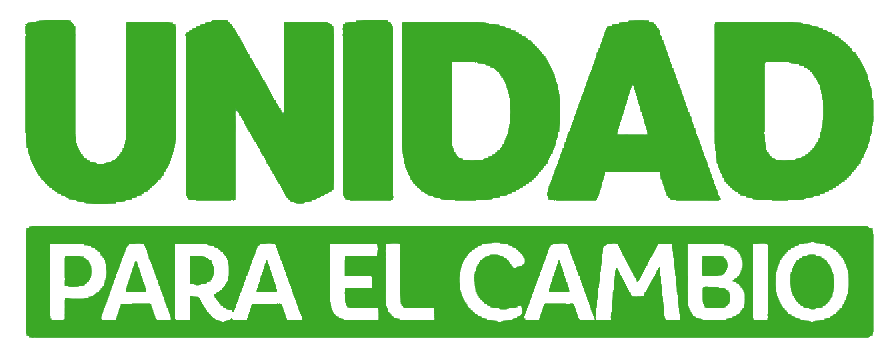
Unity for Change logo

The coalition consisted of the Communist Party of Chile (PCCh), a former party of the New Majority. In addition, Chile Digno also included the Progressive Party and the Social Green Regionalist Federation. The Progressive Party left the coalition in 2020.

Party	Spanish	Leader
Communist Party	Partido Comunista	Guillermo Teillier
Social Green Regionalist Federation	Federación Regionalista Verde Social	Jaime Mulet
Libertarian Left	Izquierda Libertaria	None
Humanist Action	Acción Humanista	Tomás Hirsch
Christian Left of Chile	Izquierda Cristiana de Chile	Víctor Osorio Reyes

== See also ==
- List of political parties in Chile
- New Majority (Chile)
- Chile Vamos
- Progressive Convergence
- Broad Front
