= Lautaro Carmona =

President of the Communist Party of Chile

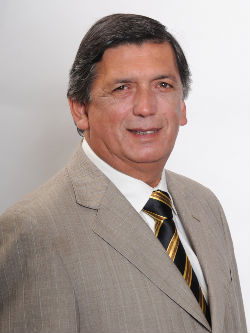
- Lautaro Carmona Soto in 2011.

President of the Communist Party of Chile
- Incumbent
- Assumed office 29 August 2023
- Preceded by: Guillermo Teillier

Member of the Chamber of Deputies
- In office 11 March 2010 – 11 March 2018
- Preceded by: Antonio Leal Labrín
- Succeeded by: Constituency disestablished
- Constituency: 5th District

Personal details
- Born: 26 April 1952 (age 74) Limache, Valparaíso Region, Chile
- Party: Communist Party of Chile
- Spouse: Erika Alert Oliva
- Children: 3
- Education: University of Chile
- Profession: Public administrator, politician

Lautaro Carmona Soto (born 26 April 1952) is a Chilean politician and public administrator who has served as President of the Communist Party of Chile (PCCh) since 2023.

A lifelong party member, he rose through its ranks during the Pinochet dictatorship and later served as a member of the Chamber of Deputies of Chile for the Atacama Region from 2010 to 2018.

== Early life and education ==
Lautaro Carmona Soto was born in Limache, in central Chile's Valparaíso Region. His parents, Ramón Carmona and Yolanda Soto, were both teachers; his father was also a writer and poet. He attended high school in San Miguel, a commune of Santiago, and went on to graduate with a degree in public administration from the University of Chile in 1977.

== Political career ==
=== Beginnings and rise ===
Carmona's political involvement began early. He joined the Communist Youth of Chile (JJCC) in 1968 while still in secondary school and campaigned for socialist presidential candidate Salvador Allende the following year. Following the 1973 military coup that overthrew Allende, the Communist Party was banned and driven underground. Carmona played a significant role in its clandestine reorganization. In 1977, he traveled secretly to several communist nations, including Cuba and the Soviet Union, for coordination and training.

From 1979 to 1989, operating under the pseudonym Camilo Contreras, he served as the Secretary General of the Communist Youth and was elevated to the party's Political Commission, its top leadership body.

After Chile's return to democracy in 1990, Carmona remained a central figure in the PCCh. He held several high-level internal positions, including National Reorganization Officer and member of both the Political Commission and the Central Committee. Following the death of longtime party leader Gladys Marín in 2005, he was elected Secretary General, a post he held for nearly two decades, serving as the party's chief operational officer.

=== Parliamentary tenure ===
After unsuccessful bids for the Chamber of Deputies in 1997 and 2001, Carmona was elected in the 2009 parliamentary election, representing District 5 in the mineral-rich Atacama Region. He was re-elected in 2013. During his two terms (2010–2018), he served on several key committees, notably those for Government and Interior, Human Rights, and Labor.

In the 2017 election, he ran for the Senate from Atacama but was defeated. He made another bid for the Chamber of Deputies in the 2021 election under Chile's new electoral districting but was not successful.

=== Party presidency ===
On 29 August 2023, Lautaro Carmona was elected President of the Communist Party of Chile, succeeding Guillermo Teillier. His election came at a time of significant political realignment in Chile, with the PCCh being a key component of the left-wing coalition that had recently held the presidency under Gabriel Boric.

== Personal life ==
Carmona is married to kinesiologist Érika Alert Oliva, with whom he has three children: Andrés, Fernando, and Paz.
