= Constanza Valdés =

Chilean trans activist

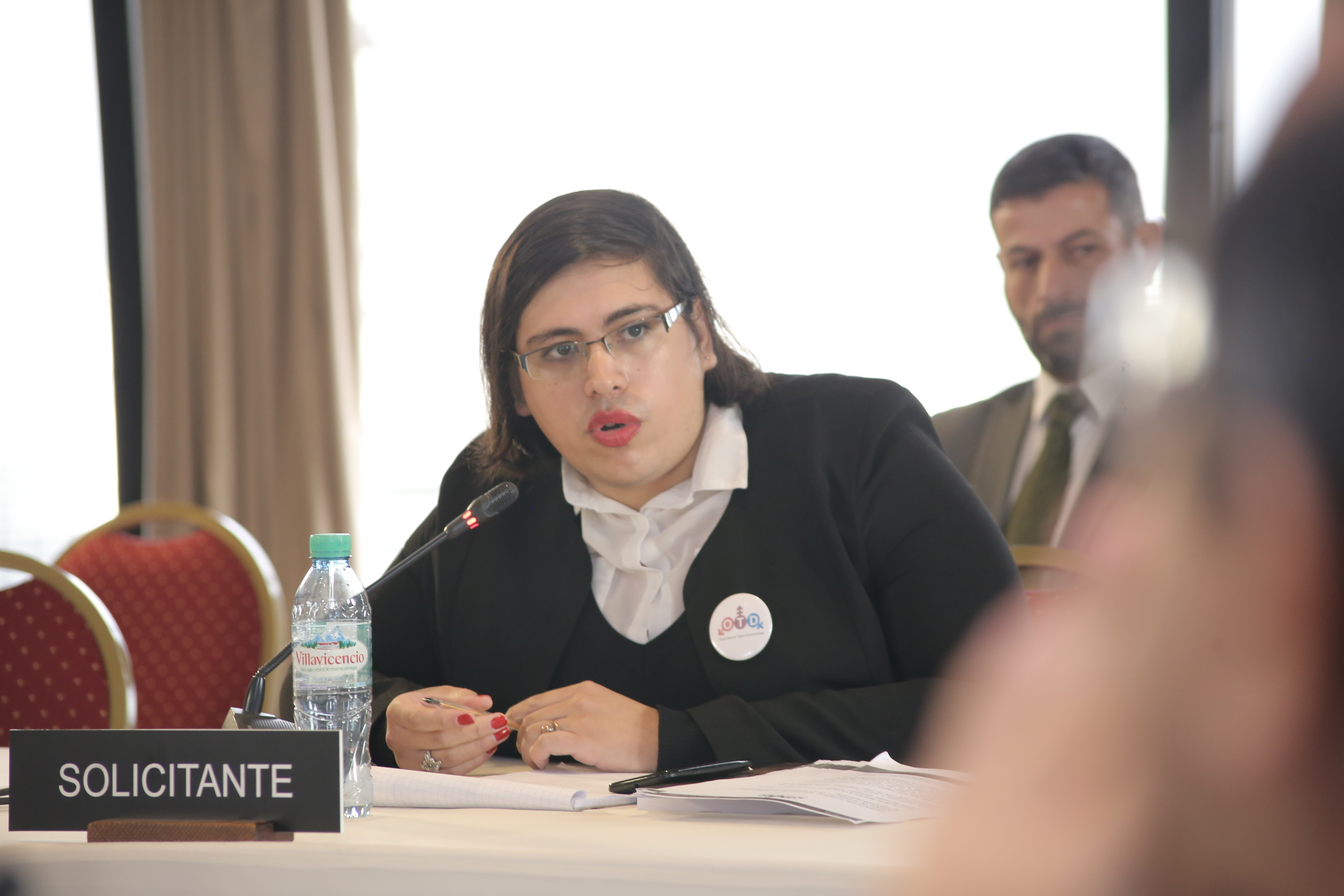
Constanza Valdés in 2017

Constanza Valdés is a trans woman and Chilean political activist and parliamentary advisor.

She became the spokesperson for Broad Front in June 2017, making her the first trans spokesperson for a political organization. She supported a 2017 Gender Identity Law in Chile which simplifies the procedure for trans people to change their name and sex, though she criticized it for not going far enough.

Valdés was the legal advisor for Chilean group Organizing Trans-Diversities, an advocacy group for trans rights. She is currently an adviser to Chilean politician Claudia Mix. Valdés is a member of the Chilean Pirate Party.

Valdés studied law at Diego Portales University. In an interview with Qué Pasa, she stated that she knew her gender identity when she was 18, but it took her five years to publicly identify as female, fearing it would cause her problems at university. She changed her legal name and sex on April 21, 2016. In a 2017 interview, Valdés said that she did not want hormone therapy or surgery, and described herself as a feminist.
