= Unir Movement =

Chilean political party

Unir Movement Movimiento Unir
- Abbreviation: UNIR
- Leader: Marcelo Díaz Díaz
- General coordinators: Lorena Fries; Julio Salas
- Founded: 7 March 2020; 6 years ago
- Dissolved: 5 August 2023
- Split from: Socialist Party of Chile
- Merged into: Comunes
- Headquarters: Almirante Riveros 062, Providencia, Santiago de Chile
- Youth wing: Young Circle
- Women's wing: Feminist Circle
- Ideology: Progressivism; Democratic socialism Eco-socialism; Feminism; Plurinationalism
- Political position: Centre-left to left-wing
- National affiliation: Apruebo Dignidad; Broad Front
- Colours: Rose Pink

Website
- movimientounir.cl

The Unir Movement (Spanish: Movimiento Unir) was a Chilean centre-left to left-wing political movement, founded in 2020 by former members of the Socialist Party of Chile. In July 2020, it became part of the Broad Front, a left-wing political coalition.

== Authorities ==
=== Deputies ===
Deputies elected in the 2021 parliamentary elections.

Name	Region	District	Period
Lorena Fries	Region of Metropolitan Region	10	2022-2026
Patricio Rosas	Region of Los Lagos	24	2022-2026
