= Libertarian Left (Chile) =

Political movement

Libertarian Left Izquierda Libertaria
- Abbreviation: IL
- Founded: 1999 (Anarcho Communist Unification Congress); 2002 (Libertarian Communist Organization); 2015 (Libertarian Left)
- Merger of: OCL; FEL; UMLEM
- Think tank: Node XXI
- Student wing: FEL
- Women's wing: IL Feminist Front
- Ideology: Libertarian socialism Anarcho-communism; Self-managing socialism Anti-neoliberalism; Anti-fascism; Internationalism; Feminism
- Political position: Left-wing to far-left
- National affiliation: Broad Front (2017–2019); Apruebo Dignidad (Jan–Aug 2021); Chile Digno (2020–2022); Popular Ecologist Left (2024–present)
- Regional affiliation: São Paulo Forum; ALBA Movements
- Colours: Red; Dark purple Purple
- Slogan: "For a socialist, feminist and libertarian country: we continue to build a dignified and sovereign people"
- Senate: 0 / 43
- Chamber of Deputies: 0 / 155
- Regional boards: 1 / 278

Website
- izquierdalibertaria.cl

The Libertarian Left (Spanish: Izquierda Libertaria, IL) is a Chilean political and social movement formed in 2015 from the merger of the Libertarian Communist Organization (OCL), the Libertarian Students Front (FEL), the Ernesto Miranda Fighting Muralist Units (UMLEM) and other groups.

== Origin ==
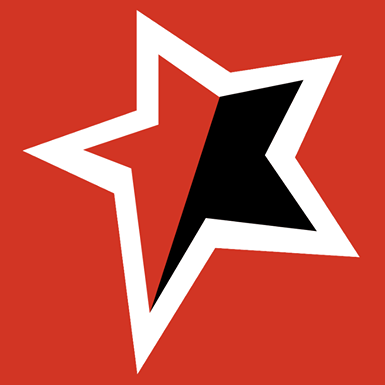
Old logo

In the 1990s, libertarian communism began to rearticulate in Chile, and the Congreso de Unificación Anarco-Comunista (Anarcho-Communist Unification Congress, CUAC) was founded in 1999, which would be the first political organization in this process that sought to establish a specific anarcho-communist organization. Later, and a direct continuation of this experience, the Libertarian Communist Organization (OCL) was created in 2002 to build underground political-social fronts throughout the country, including the Libertarian Students Front (FEL). The OCL was the driving force behind the Red Libertaria (Libertarian Network, RL), which joined the Todos a la Moneda platform in the 2013 Chilean election, whose candidate was Marcel Claude.

In 2015, OCL, along with other groups and expressions of the Chilean libertarian and rebel movement, entered a Strategic Congress where the creation of the Libertarian Left was proposed, after verifying the need to have a public reference that would allow them to face the tasks that were defined for said period, and whose launch took place at the Novedades Theater in Santiago on 11 June 2016.

== Ideology ==
Tactically, the party supports both mass direct action and electoral struggle as complementary dimensions within the framework of a strategy of democratic breakdown.

== Trajectory ==
Izquierda Libertaria was one of the organizations that founded the Frente Amplio (Broad Front), appearing in the 2017 Chilean general election where they obtained a seat for the 13th district with Gael Yeomans, and in the regional board of Tarapacá with Pablo Zambra Venegas.

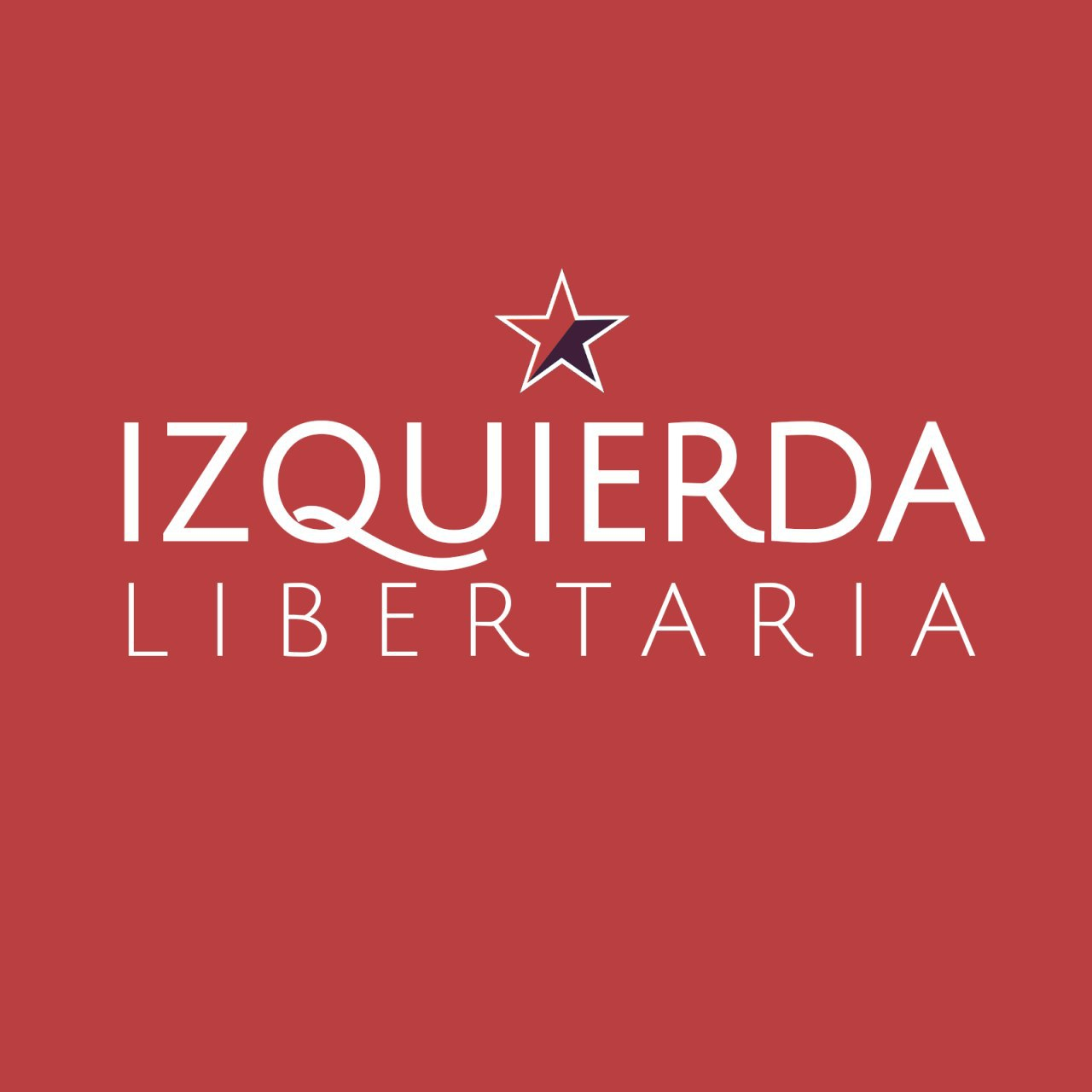
Logo of the Libertarian Left (March–October 2020)

During 2018, Izquierda Libertaria entered the process of convergence with the Frente Amplio forces that did not have a legal party, considering the Autonomist Movement, New Democracy and Socialism and Freedom, which they ratified at the end of that same year. In 2019, this process gave rise to Social Convergence, where three members were elected in the National Directorate and 8 members in the Central Committee, respectively. Subsequently, and due to internal political differences in Social Convergence as a result of the signing, in the context of the 2019 Chilean Protest, of the "Agreement for Peace and a new constitution" (which initially the movement did not consider as a sufficient response to the protests, however months later it ended up supporting it), the Political Commission of the Libertarian Left requested its membership evaluate their departure from said party. They democratically make the decision to leave it, so a large part of the movement decided to withdraw from the party (though this did not include a part of the members from the Santiago Metropolitan Region, the Congresswoman Gael Yeomans and her close circle who originally came from the Libertarian Left), thus retaking its name and public existence, which lead to its consecutive departure from the Broad Front.

On the occasion of the 2019–2020 Chilean protests, it promoted a general strike on 12 November through its Trade Union Front, pressing for the convening of a Constituent Assembly. From that moment, the movement entered an Extraordinary Congress to equip itself with new tactical-strategic definitions regarding its thesis and general political line, deploying both in popular mobilizations and in the constituent opening through the Chile Digno, formed together with the Communist Party of Chile and the Equality Party, among other left-wing parties and social organizations not signatories to the agreement. This was articulated by the approval of the Constitutional Convention within the framework of the 2020 Chilean national plebiscite for a new free, sovereign, plurinational and feminist constitution.

On 10 June 2021, Izquierda Libertaria reported that it would support the Communist Party candidate Daniel Jadue in Apruebo Dignidad's 2021 presidential primary. The following month, Jadue was defeated by the Broad Front candidate from Social Convergence, Gabriel Boric. Days before the presidential elections, Izquierda Libertaria expressed their support for Boric.

== See also ==
- Anarchism in Chile
