= Marcelo Díaz (politician) =

Chilean politician

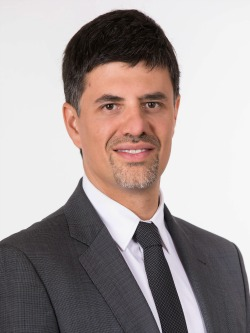

Member of the Chamber of Deputies of Chile
- In office 11 March 2018 – 11 March 2022
- Preceded by: Creation of the district
- Constituency: District 7

President of Unir Movement
- Incumbent
- Assumed office 7 March 2020
- Preceded by: Position created

Minister General Secretariat of Government
- In office 11 May 2015 – 18 November 2016
- Preceded by: Álvaro Elizalde
- Succeeded by: Paula Narváez

Ambassador of Chile in Argentina
- In office 20 March 2014 – 11 May 2015
- Preceded by: Milenko Skoknic
- Succeeded by: José Antonio Viera-Gallo

Deputy of the Republic
- In office 11 March 2006 – 11 March 2014
- Preceded by: Víctor Manuel Rebolledo
- Succeeded by: Raúl Saldívar

Governor of the Elqui Province
- In office 1 January 2002 – 16 December 2002

Personal details
- Born: 6 February 1971 (age 55) Santiago, Chile
- Party: Socialist Party; Unir Movement
- Education: La República University (BA); Complutense University of Madrid (MD)
- Occupation: Politician
- Profession: Lawyer

Marcelo Eduardo Díaz Díaz (born 6 February 1971) is a Chilean politician who served as a minister during the second government of Michelle Bachelet.

After 30 years of militancy, he announced his departure from the Socialist Party. In March 2021, he was a founding member of Unir Movement, a party which joined the Broad Front (Frente Amplio; FA).

== Early life ==
Born on 6 February 1971, Díaz is the son of Oscar Hernán Díaz Mendoza and Ana Luisa Díaz Pallacán. From 1976 to 1982, he attended primary school at the Luis Enrique Izquierdo School in the capital city Santiago. He went to secondary school at the José Victorino Lastarria Lyceé in Providencia (commune of Santiago), from where he graduated in 1987.

In 1989, he entered a law degree at the La República University, from which he graduated in 1995 with a bachelor's degree in legal sciences, and obtained his definitive law degree on 26 August 2002. In 1999, he obtained a PhD from the Complutense University of Madrid in political sciences and sociology with a specialization in international relations.

From April 1994 to September 1996, Díaz was director of the international relations and co-operation program of the INJUV (National Youth Institute). From October 1996 to May 2001, he was a technical officer and assistant general secretary of the Ibero-American Youth Organization (OIJ) in Madrid.

From June to December 2001, he was an advisor to Sistema Consultores Ltda. in the areas of modernization of public administration, international cooperation, social policies and communication.

In 2004, he was a teacher of public international law at his alma mater, La República University.

== Political career ==
=== Deputy for Valparaíso: 2018−2022 ===
Díaz ran as a candidate for deputy in the 2017 general election for the then new District 7 which grouped the communes of Algarrobo, Cartagena, Casablanca, Concón, El Quisco, El Tabo, Easter Island, Juan Fernández, San Antonio, Santo Domingo, Valparaíso and Viña del Mar. In November, he was elected after obtaining 4.7% with 15,250 votes. He assumed office on 11 March 2018.

He was a member and chair of the Permanent Commission on Culture, Arts and Communications as well as the Citizen Security (14 March 2018 − 3 April 2019). He formed part of the special investigative commissions on actions of the state institutions towards the state port sector and on acts of the Ministry of the Interior and Ministry of National Defense related to the state of emergency.

He also integrated the Permanent Commission of Constitution, Legislation, Justice and Regulation. He was part of the special investigative commissions on:

1) Agreement between CORFO and Soquimich (SQM) on the exploitation of lithium in the Atacama salt flat,
2) Appointment and conduct of judges and judicial employees of the O'Higgins Region, and
3) Performance of the State Administration in contracts of directors of TVN.

Finally, he formed part of the progressive parliamentary committee composed of Democratic Revolution, Commons, Social Convergence and other left-wing independents.

== Personal life ==
Díaz was married for five years to Paola Mónica Ramírez Zelada; they had a daughter, Javiera, born in 1998. From 2012 to 2019, he dated Millaray Viera, an actress and television host. They have a daughter, Celeste, born in 2017.
