= Tatiana Urrutia =

Chilean politician

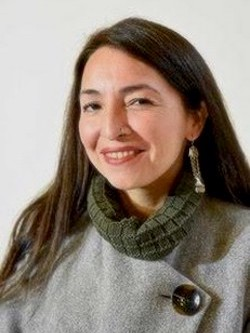

Member of the Chamber of Deputies
- Incumbent
- Assumed office 11 March 2026
- Constituency: 8th District

Member of the Constitutional Convention
- In office 4 July 2021 – 4 July 2022
- Constituency: 8th District

Personal details
- Born: 17 September 1982 (age 43) Santiago, Chile
- Party: Democratic Revolution
- Children: 2
- Occupation: Politician

Tatiana Karina Urrutia Herrera (born 17 September 1982) is a Chilean public administrator who was elected as a member of the Chilean Constitutional Convention.

Urrutia was Secretary General of Democratic Revolution.

== Biography ==
She was born on 17 September 1982 in Santiago. She is the daughter of Alicia Herrera Cruz. She is the mother of two children.

She completed her secondary education in the technical–professional track at the Instituto Superior de Comercio Eduardo Frei Montalva in Santiago, graduating in 2000. She later pursued studies in journalism and public administration.

She has worked professionally in both the public and private sectors.

== Political career ==
She is a member of Democratic Revolution (RD), where she served as Political Action Coordinator and as a member of its governing board. A grassroots activist, she has participated in the Coordinadora Feminista Somos Marea, Unidad Social, and the campaign for a new constitution under the label Marca AC. In 2020, she coordinated the “Que Chile Decida” pro-approval campaign committee in Maipú.

In the 15–16 May 2021 elections, she ran as a candidate for the Constitutional Convention representing the 8th district of the Metropolitan Region, as a member of Democratic Revolution within the Apruebo Dignidad list. She obtained 4,435 votes, corresponding to 0.98% of the valid votes cast.

In 2025, she ran as candidate for a seat in the Chamber of Deputies. She was elected in November.
