= Fernando Atria =

Chilean legal scholar and politician

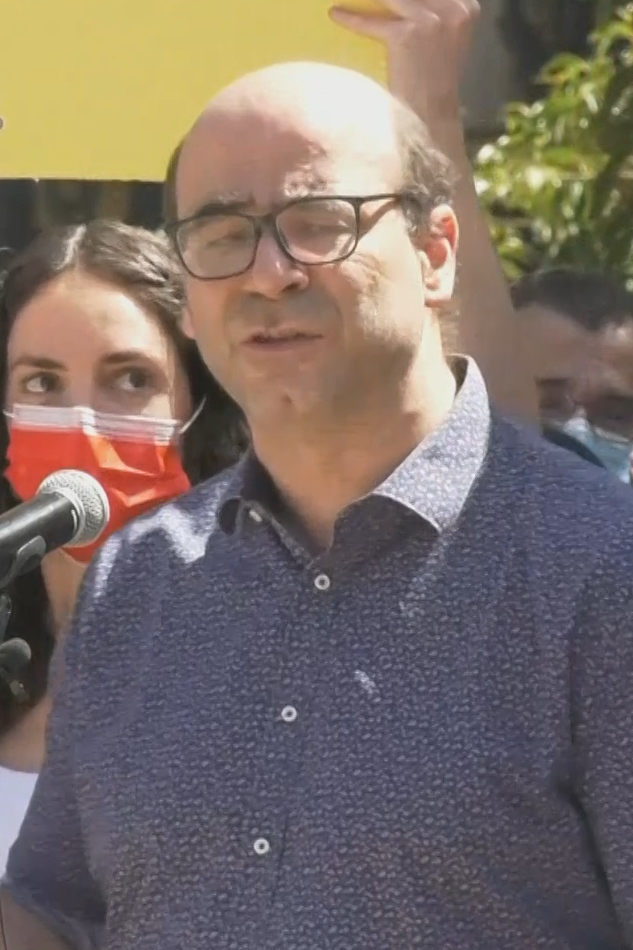

Member of the Constitutional Convention
- In office 4 July 2021 – 4 July 2022
- Constituency: 10th District

Personal details
- Born: 30 October 1968 (age 57) New York, United States
- Party: Socialist Party (2010–2019); Common Force (2020–2022); Social Convergence (2022–2024)
- Education: Universidad de Chile (LL.B, 1994); University of Edinburgh (Ph.D. in Laws, 1999)
- Occupation: Politician
- Profession: Lawyer

Fernando Atria Lemaitre (born 30 October 1968) is a Chilean intellectual, lawyer, university teacher and politician. Atria has been an avid participant of the intellectual debates about reforms in the Chilean education system and the Constitution of Chile.

He has been called by El Mostrador "the ideologue of the 2011 Chilean student protests". Writing in El Desconcierto in 2018 pundit Rodrigo Karmy Bolton posits that Fernando Atria is Axel Kaiser's main "intellectual enemy". Similarly, there have been centre-right intellectuals like Hugo Eduardo Herrera who have been strong critics of Atria.

In the 2021 Chilean Constitutional Convention election Atria won a seat into the Constitutional Convention that drafted a new constitution proposal for Chile. During this time Atria made frequent TV appearances defending the work of the convention and the proposed constitution.

== Biography ==
Atria was born on 30 October 1968 in Queens, New York City, United States. He is the son of Raúl Atria, a lawyer and sociologist, and María José Lemaitre, a sociologist.

He is married to lawyer Ximena Fuentes Torrijos, a Doctor of International Law from the University of Oxford and Director of the National Directorate of Borders and Limits of the Ministry of Foreign Affairs (Chile), with whom he has three children.

== Scholar career ==
Atria completed his primary and secondary education at Colegio Notre Dame, graduating in 1986. He pursued higher education at the University of Chile, where he earned a law degree in June 1994.

In July 1999, he obtained a PhD in Law from the University of Edinburgh in Scotland.

He is an associate academic of the Department of Legal Sciences at the Faculty of Law of the University of Chile, as well as of other academic institutions.

A specialist in constitutional law, he has published several books, including The Deceptive Constitution (2013), Social Rights and Education: A New Paradigm of the Public (2014), and The Form of Law (2016).

He is also co-author of The Other Model: From the Neoliberal Order to the Regime of the Public (2013).

== Political career ==
Atria is an independent politician. Between 2010 and 2019, he was a member of the Socialist Party of Chile. He currently serves as president of the political movement Fuerza Común.

In the 2017 parliamentary elections, he ran as a candidate for the Chamber of Deputies of Chile representing the Socialist Party in the 11th District of the Metropolitan Region of Santiago. He obtained 16,107 votes, corresponding to 4.28% of the total votes, and was not elected.

In the elections held on 15–16 May 2021, he ran as a candidate for the Constitutional Convention representing the 10th District of the Metropolitan Region as an independent on a seat allocated to Revolución Democrática, within the Apruebo Dignidad electoral pact. He obtained 52,556 votes, equivalent to 12.36% of the valid votes cast, becoming the leading vote-getter in the district.
