= Bárbara Sepúlveda Hales =

Chilean politician and scholar

Bárbara Sepúlveda
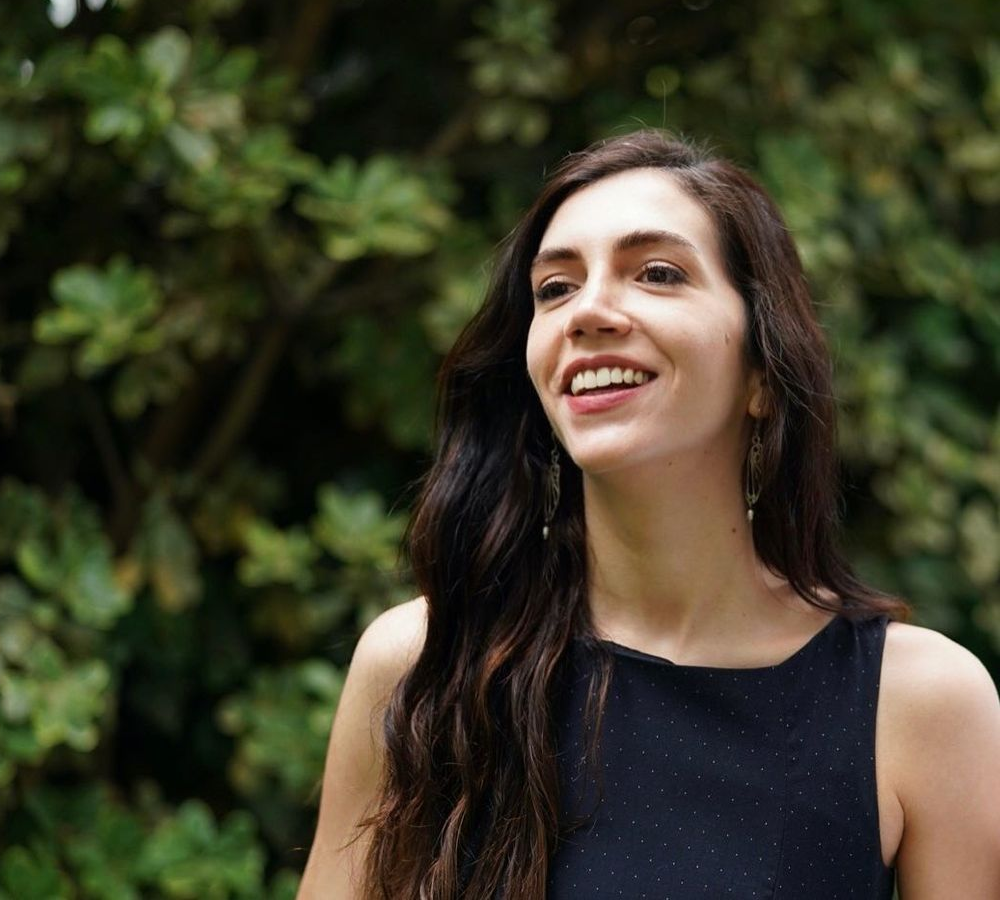

Member of the Constitutional Convention
- In office 4 July 2021 – 4 July 2022
- Constituency: 9th District

Personal details
- Born: 19 June 1985 (age 41) Santiago, Chile
- Party: Communist Party of Chile
- Education: University of Chile (LL.B, LL.M); London School of Economics (MD)
- Occupation: Politician
- Profession: Lawyer

Bárbara Sepúlveda Hales (born 19 July 1985) is a Chilean constitutional lawyer, academic, feminist activist, and politician.

A member of the Communist Party of Chile, she was elected as a member of the Constitutional Convention in 2021, representing the 9th District of the Metropolitan Region of Santiago.

== Early life and family ==
Sepúlveda was born in Las Condes, Santiago, on 19 July 1985. She is the daughter of Leandro Sepúlveda Soto and Cecilia Hales Dib. She is married to Sebastián Fierro Kalbhenn.

== Education and academic career ==
Sepúlveda completed her secondary education at Colegio San Jorge in Arica, graduating in 2003. She later studied law at the University of Chile, where she earned a degree in legal and social sciences. Her undergraduate thesis, completed in 2013, was titled American Legal Realism: School of Law.

She was admitted to the Chilean bar after taking the oath before the Supreme Court of Justice on 26 September 2014. She holds a master’s degree in public law from the University of Chile (2015–2016) and a master’s degree in gender studies from the London School of Economics (2016–2017).

Professionally, she has worked as a legal counsel for the Municipality of Recoleta since 2018. Previously, she served as a lawyer in the Legal Advisory Unit of the Ministry General Secretariat of Government between 2014 and 2015, among other public-sector roles.

== Political career ==
Sepúlveda is a member of the Communist Party of Chile and has been active as a social leader and human rights advocate. Between 2015 and 2016, she served as executive director of the Foundation Against Street Harassment (Fundación Contra el Acoso Callejero).

She is also a co-founder and executive director of the Association of Feminist Lawyers (Abofem).

== Constitutional Convention ==
In the elections held on 15–16 May 2021, Sepúlveda ran as a candidate for the Constitutional Convention representing the 9th District of the Metropolitan Region, as part of the Apruebo Dignidad electoral list for the Communist Party of Chile. She obtained 24,900 votes, corresponding to 7.85% of the valid votes cast, and was elected as a member of the Convention.

On 6 January 2022, in accordance with the Convention’s regulations establishing adjunct vice presidencies, she was ratified as Vice President Adjunct of the Convention’s Board of Directors.
