= Guillermo Teillier =

Chilean politician (1943–2023)

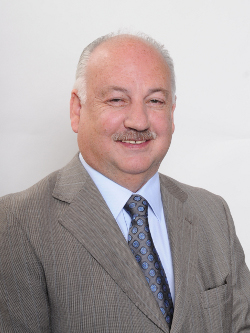

President of the Communist Party of Chile
- In office March 2005 – 29 August 2023
- Preceded by: Gladys Marín
- Succeeded by: Lautaro Carmona

Secretary-General of the Communist Party of Chile
- In office 2002–2005
- Preceded by: Gladys Marín
- Succeeded by: Lautaro Carmona

Personal details
- Born: Guillermo León Teillier del Valle; 29 October 1943; Santa Bárbara, Chile
- Died: 29 August 2023 (aged 79); Santiago, Chile
- Political party: PCC

Guillermo León Teillier del Valle (29 October 1943 – 29 August 2023) was a Chilean politician, educator, and writer and president of the Communist Party of Chile (PCC).

== Political activism ==
Teillier was born in Santa Bárbara in the Biobío region of Chile. He joined the Communist Youth in 1958, serving as regional secretary in the cities of Temuco and Valdivia. He then became regional secretary in Valdivia, where he was caught in the 1973 Chilean coup d'état. In 1974, he held the same post in Concepción and Lota. In the middle of that year, while participating in a political meeting in Santiago, he was arrested by agents of the Air Force Intelligence Service (Sifa). He was imprisoned for two years in the basements of the Aviation War Academy, where he was tortured.

Between 1983 and 1987 he was head of the Military Commission of the PCC and was responsible for channelling the aid sent from Cuba to Chile and also for being the link with the Manuel Rodríguez Patriotic Front (FPMR), the PCC's armed wing, which led operations such as the attack on Augusto Pinochet and the smuggling of weapons through Carrizal Bajo. In hiding, he constantly changed his identity and appearance. He had various aliases, such as José, Roberto, Fernando, Carlos and, finally, Sebastián Larraín.

Teillier became leader of the PCC in March 2005, after the death of the historic leader of the party and former deputy Gladys Marín. On that occasion, the IX Plenary Session of the Central Committee elected him interim president of the party and in November 2006, the XXIII National Congress of the party ratified him in the post.

He was elected to the Chamber of Deputies for electorate No. 28 (covering Lo Espejo, Pedro Aguirre Cerda and San Miguel in the Santiago Metropolitan region) for the 2010–2014 and 2014–2018 parliamentary terms; for the 2018–2022 period, he represented the District 13 covering approximately the same area.

== Death ==
Teillier died in Santiago on 29 August 2023, at age 79. President Gabriel Boric expressed his condolences and decreed national mourning for Teillier's death, "as a tribute to his dedication to Chile throughout his life, and his tireless effort to build a more just society". Deputies from the right-wing opposition parties National Renewal and the Republican Party criticized the national mourning, citing Teillier's role in the 1986 arms smuggling at Carrizal Bajo and for acting as the link between the PCC and the Manuel Rodríguez Patriotic Front during the military dicatorship. Venezuelan president Nicolás Maduro also expressed his condolences, calling Teillier a great friend of his and "of Hugo Chávez and of the Bolivarian Revolution".
