= Frente Amplio (Chilean political coalition) =

Political coalition in Chile

- Leader: Gabriel Boric
- Founded: 21 January 2017; 9 years ago
- Dissolved: 19 April 2024; 2 years ago
- Succeeded by: Frente Amplio (political party)
- Headquarters: Santiago de Chile
- Ideology: Democratic socialism Progressivism; Radical democracy Factions: Autonomism; Social democracy
- Political position: Left-wing
- National affiliation: Apruebo Dignidad (2021–2023)

Website
- frente-amplio.cl

The Frente Amplio (FA, Spanish for 'Broad Front') was a Chilean political coalition founded in early 2017, composed of left-wing parties and movements. Its first electoral contest was the 2017 Chilean general election, where their presidential candidate Beatriz Sánchez came third with 20% of the vote in the first round (missing the second-round cutoff by 3%). The Frente Amplio also expanded their electoral representation to 20 deputies (out of 155), 1 senator (out of 43) and 21 out of 278 regional councillors, thus consolidating the movement as a third force in Chilean politics.

In July 2024, its member parties merged into the new Frente Amplio political party.

== Platform and ideology ==
The Frente Amplio was mostly made up of left-wing political parties that aimed to change the pre-existing political situation of Chile in favor of participative democracy and feminism. Some reports considered its ideology close to populism due to the fact that the coalition was built off of existing popular movements, such as the 2011 student movement.

Certain members of the Frente Amplio expressed their support for the government of Nicolás Maduro in Venezuela after the call for presidential elections which was questioned by the international community and the Chilean government, while other members of the coalition, such as the Democratic Revolution and Social Convergence parties, rejected and criticized the elections and the Maduro regime.

Although it has the same name as the center-left coalition from Uruguay, political analysts tend to see the Chilean coalition as more similar to the Spanish left-wing populist party Podemos. Diverging views existed within the coalition. Some members, such as Liberal Party (PL) founder Vlado Mirosevic argued the coalition cannot be broad if it only includes left-leaning forces. On the other hand, presidential primary candidate Alberto Mayol highlighted the fact that a clear "leftist tradition" exists in most of the coalition members.

== History ==
The Frente Amplio's origins lay in the 2011 Chilean student movement, the second biggest social protest in the country's recent history since the restoration of democracy in 1990. Student demands centered on the right to free education and led to months of school and university occupations across Chile, which continued for several years. Within the student movement, new political forces began to emerge, displacing traditional forces (such as the Communist Youth and center-left groups) at the head of high school and university unions and federations. Among them where Giorgio Jackson at the Catholic University and Gabriel Boric at the University of Chile.

In the 2014 Chilean general election, both Jackson and Boric became MPs after running as independents and defying both traditional coalitions: the center-right Chile Vamos and the center-left Nueva Mayoría (formerly, Concertación). Along with Mirosevic (PL), Jackson and Boric were the only Frente Amplio MPs at the moment of the alliance's constitution. The movement had formed the organisations Democratic Revolution (2012) and Red Libertaria (2013), and participated in the Everyone to La Moneda platform in the 2013 Chilean general election.

In early 2016, it was reported that Boric and Jackson held talks with several political and social movements in order to create a "broad left front" of anti-establishment forces, aiming to have a parliamentary list and a presidential candidate for the 2017 general elections. By August 2016, Boric's Autonomist Movement (MA) and Jackson's Democratic Revolution made a formal alliance with the Libertarian Left, New Democracy and the Humanist Party. After the October 2016 municipal elections, Jorge Sharp (MA) became the first political independent to rule Chile's third largest city: Valparaíso. Sharp's rise began as a grassroots initiative, running with several other left-wing candidates in a "citizen primary", described by The Guardian as a "quiet revolution against politics-as-usual".

In January 2017 the Frente Amplio was formally established by eleven political groups. Discussions began on how to choose a presidential nominee. Initially, the coalition was in favor of implementing an online referendum, but later decided in favor of participating in the legal primary process, since this would give them the chance to engage in a real electoral test and obtain national coverage at the same level as their well-established rival political coalitions. Since most of the Frente Amplio's members were movements lacking official status as political parties, the bloc decided to collect thousands of signatures to grant Democratic Revolution official political party status and use it to apply for the primaries. In May 2017, Democratic Revolution submitted close to 49,000 signatures to the Electoral Service, thus qualifying for implementing primaries.

In June 2017, Constanza Valdés became the spokesperson for the Frente Amplio. She was the first transgender spokesperson for a political organization.

The primaries took place as part of the July 2017 Chilean presidential primaries. Beatriz Sánchez, a popular journalist nominated by the majority of the Frente Amplio forces, obtained 67.56%, beating sociologist Alberto Mayol, who obtained 32.44%. 327,716 people voted in the Frente Amplio primary (a small number compared to the 1,418,138 who decided to vote for the right-wing Chile Vamos candidates).

The Frente Amplio presented several candidates for the Chamber of Deputies and Regional Councils, as well as some for the Senate. Among the notable figures were (besides those serving as MPs at that time) former presidential candidate Tomás Hirsch, journalist Pamela Jiles, student leaders such as former FECh president Camila Rojas, and several others. As of September 2017—and according to several opinion polls—Sánchez was fighting closely with Nueva Mayoría candidate, Alejandro Guillier, to make it into the second round and face businessman and former president Sebastián Piñera. Finally, in the November general election, Sánchez came third with 20% of the vote—just missing getting into the second round by 3%. This was the best performance of any non-traditional left-wing candidate since the return to democracy. The Frente Amplio also expanded its electoral representation from 3 to 20 deputies, one senator and 21 regional counselors, thus consolidating the alliance as the "third force" of Chilean politics.

After the 2017 elections, a reorganization process took place among the members of the coalition: in January 2018, the Autonomist Movement began organizing convergences or mergers in order to become a new political party, and on November 10, 2018, a meeting between the MA, Libertarian Left, New Democracy and Socialism and Freedom was held at the Huemul Theater, which led to the creation of the Social Convergence party in May 2019. On the other hand, Autonomous Left and Citizen Power announced their merger on September 27, 2018, which materialized on January 20, 2019 with the launch of the Comunes party. In total, the Frente Amplio was made up of seven parties and two political movements.

=== Internal crisis and desertions ===
On November 17, 2018, after the signing—by some of the Frente Amplio members—of the "Agreement for Social Peace and the New Constitution" as a result of a series of protests that had occurred in October, the Equality and Green Ecologist parties announced the suspension of their participation in the coalition, waiting for their respective support bases to define the permanence or departure of the coalition. The Green Ecologist Party (PEV) confirmed their departure from the Frente Amplio on November 21, 2019, after a vote in which 76% of its members voted to abandon the coalition.

Two weeks after an agreement between the ruling and opposition parties was signed, the Democratic Popular Movement (MDP) also announced their departure. At the same time, the Equality Party (PI) announced its resignation from the coalition on November 30. The next day, the Humanist Party (PH) announced a consultation between its members during December 7 and 8 relating to their continued membership in the Frente Amplio. According to a statement, the following facts were taken into consideration when agreeing to carry out said consultation: the participation of Democratic Revolution, the Liberal Party and Comunes in the agreement with the government for a new constitution; the resignation of the PEV and the PI; the destructuring of Social Convergence with the departure of Valparaíso Mayor Sharp and part of Libertarian Left, in addition to the departure of several grassroots political and social groups such as the MDP. Finally, on December 12, the PH announced its withdrawal from the Frente Amplio. On December 26, 2019, the Chilean Pirate Party announced its withdrawal from the coalition, pointing out the same reasons as the PEV, the PH and the PI.

On December 5, 2020, PL announced its exit from the coalition after the coalition's unsuccessful negotiations to establish an electoral pact with Constituent Unity. That same month, three of its deputies resigned from the bloc, Natalia Castillo and Pablo Vidal (both former RD) and Patricio Rosas (former Unir Movement member, although he would later return to the party), leaving it with a representation of twelve seats in the Chamber of Deputies. Castillo, Vidal and the two PL deputies—Mirosevic and Alejandro Bernales—announced the creation of a new center-left platform on December 16 called Nuevo Trato ('New Deal').

=== Apruebo Dignidad pact (2021–2023) ===
==== April 2021 elections ====
On December 22, 2020, the Frente Amplio made official a pact with Chile Digno, formed by the Communist Party, the Social Green Regionalist Federation and Humanist Action. This agreement was carried out with the intention of participating in the elections of constituent conventions, regional and municipal governors in April 2021. The alliance was called Apruebo Dignidad. On January 11, 2021, they registered their candidates to the Constitutional Convention, forming part of the Apruebo Dignidad list, among which was their former presidential candidate Beatriz Sánchez for the 12th district, the Santiago Metropolitan Region.

==== 2021 presidential election ====
For the 2021 presidential election, the Unir Movement announced Marcelo Díaz as their presidential candidate in November 2020, while Social Convergence and Democratic Revolution nominated Deputy of Magallanes Gabriel Boric in March 2021.

Finally, Boric participated in the [[2021 Chilean presidential primaries|presidential primary of Apruebo Dignidad]] as representative of the FA, facing the candidate of the Communist Party, Daniel Jadue, who also represented the Chile Digno pact. Boric defeated Jadue in that primary with over 60% of the votes, thus becoming the sole candidate of Apruebo Dignidad and the left in the November presidential elections. In the first round of the presidential election, held on November 21, 2021, Boric obtained 25.83% of the votes, and therefore went on to the second round of the presidential election along with José Antonio Kast of the Republican Party, who received 27.91% of the votes. After passing to the second round, Boric received the support of the Socialist Party, Christian Democratic Party, Party for Democracy, Liberal Party, Progressive Party, Radical Party, Green Ecologist Party, Equality Party, Humanist Party, Citizens and the movements New Deal and Non-Neutral Independents.

During the second round, the close circle of his cabinet was formed by the former president of the Medical Association Izkia Siches as head of the campaign, the deputy Giorgio Jackson as political manager and the sociologist Sebastián Kraljevich as strategy leader. It also received the collaboration of Congresspeople Gonzalo Winter, Camila Vallejo, Camila Rojas, Miguel Crispi and Alejandra Sepúlveda.

In the December 19, 2021 elections, more than 8.3 million people voted, which meant the highest electoral participation in Chile since the implementation of voluntary voting. Boric was elected President of the Republic with 55.8% of the votes, the highest number of votes in Chilean history and the youngest at the time of assuming the national presidency.

=== Officialism and party fusion ===
On March 11, 2022, the FA became part of the ruling coalition. The first cabinet of ministers appointed by President Boric had a large presence of the bloc in eight portfolios, among them the General Secretariat of the Presidency, with Giorgio Jackson (RD); and in Women and Gender Equity, with Antonia Orellana (CS), both belonging to La Moneda's political committee. The defeat of the Apruebo option in the September 2022 constitutional referendum, where the Constitutional Convention's proposal for a new Constitution was rejected, ended with a cabinet change that set back the presence of Apruebo Dignidad and the FA in the Government.

A year later, the leaders of Apruebo Dignidad admitted that the coalition had ceased to function, explaining that the coordination of the pro-government parties was carried out under the organization of the Government Alliance.

On October 5, 2023, the FA began the process of merging its member parties to form a single political collective. RD and CS called for a referendum on March 9 and 10, where the members were consulted on their approval or rejection of the merger. A little more than 10,000 people participated in the process, 16% of the militancy of the two formations registered to the electoral service, and voted in favor of the merger by more than 80%. Comunes did not participate in the consultation due to the dissolution process it was facing at that time before the Court of Appeals. With the merger, the single party of the FA became the group with the most members in Chile, with 62,000 registered people.

== Composition ==
The coalition consisted of four political parties and movements:

Party name	Name (Spanish)	Leader	Deputies	Senators
Democratic Revolution	Revolución Democrática (RD)	Diego Vela	7 / 155	1 / 43
Social Convergence	Convergencia Social (CS)	Diego Ibáñez	10 / 155	0 / 43
Comunes	Comunes	Marco Velarde	4 / 155	0 / 43

=== Movements ===
Name	Name (Spanish)	Leader	Deputies	Senators
Socialist Platform	Plataforma Socialista	Jorge Arrate	0 / 155	0 / 43

=== Former members (departed before merger) ===
Party	Name (Spanish)
País	País
Libertarian Left	Izquierda Libertaria (IL)
Equality Party	Partido Igualdad (PI)
Humanist Party	Partido Humanista (PH)
Liberal Party	Partido Liberal (PL)
Green Ecologist Party	Partido Ecologista Verde (PEV)
Democratic Popular Movement	Movimiento Democrático Popular (MDP)
