= Pedro Aguirre Cerda (commune) =

- Commune
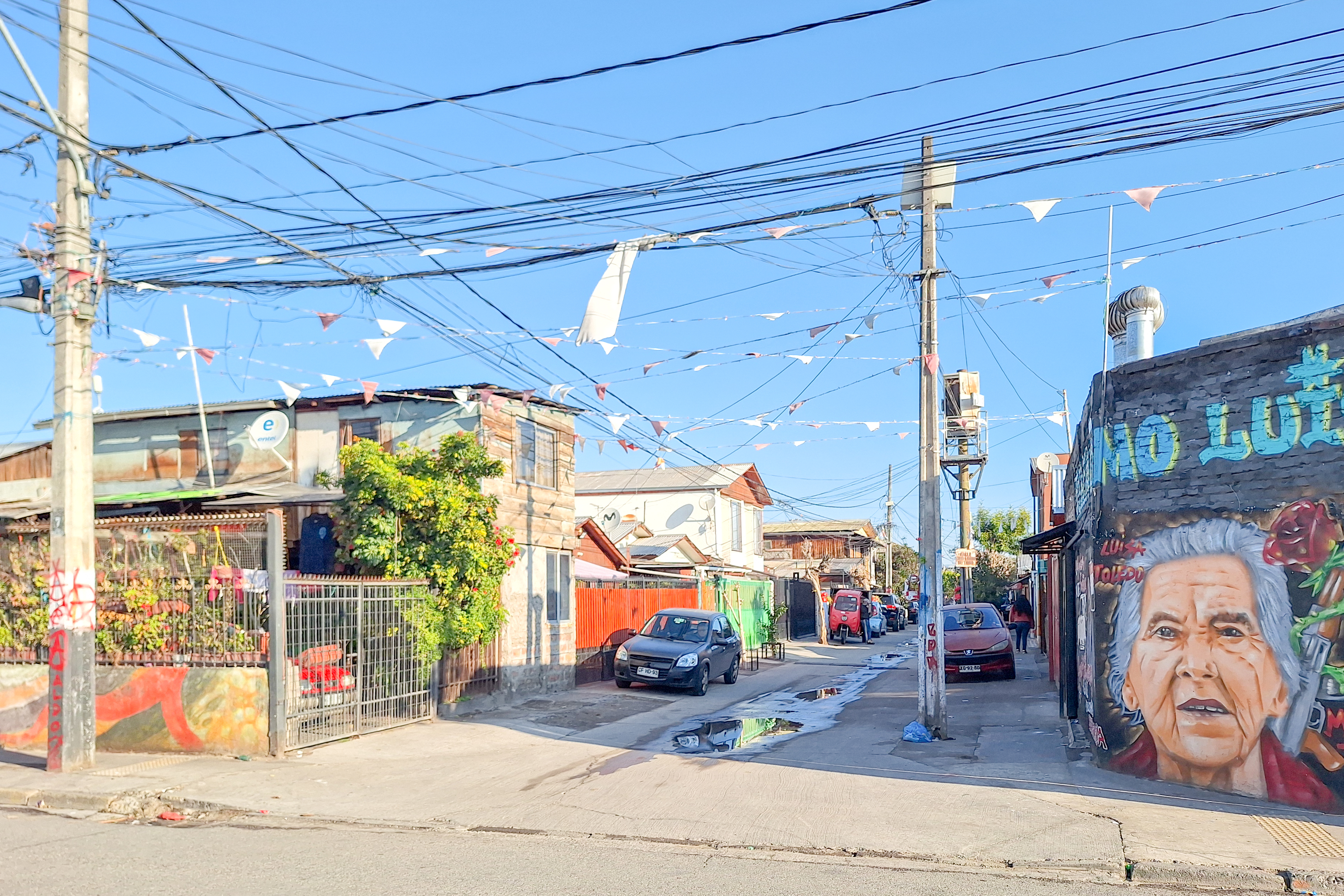
- La Victoria village

- Coat of arms Location of Pedro Aguirre Cerda in Greater Santiago Location in Chile
- Coordinates (city): 33°29.5′S 70°40.5′W
- Country: Chile
- Region: Santiago Metropolitan
- Province: Santiago
- Established: 12 August 1981

Government
  - Type: Municipality
  - Alcalde: Claudina Núñez Jiménez (PCCh)

Area
  - Total: 9.7 km^{2} (3.7 sq mi)

Population (2024)
  - Total: 96,062
  - Density: 9,900/km^{2} (26,000/sq mi)
- Time zone: UTC-4 (CLT)
  - Summer (DST): UTC-3 (CLST)
- Area code: 56 +
- Website: Municipality of Pedro Aguirre Cerda

Pedro Aguirre Cerda (Spanish pronunciation: [ˈpeðɾo aˈɣire ˈseɾða]) is a commune of Greater Santiago, in Santiago Province in the Santiago Metropolitan Region in Chile. It has 96,062 inhabitants.

== Etymology ==
It is named after President Pedro Aguirre Cerda.

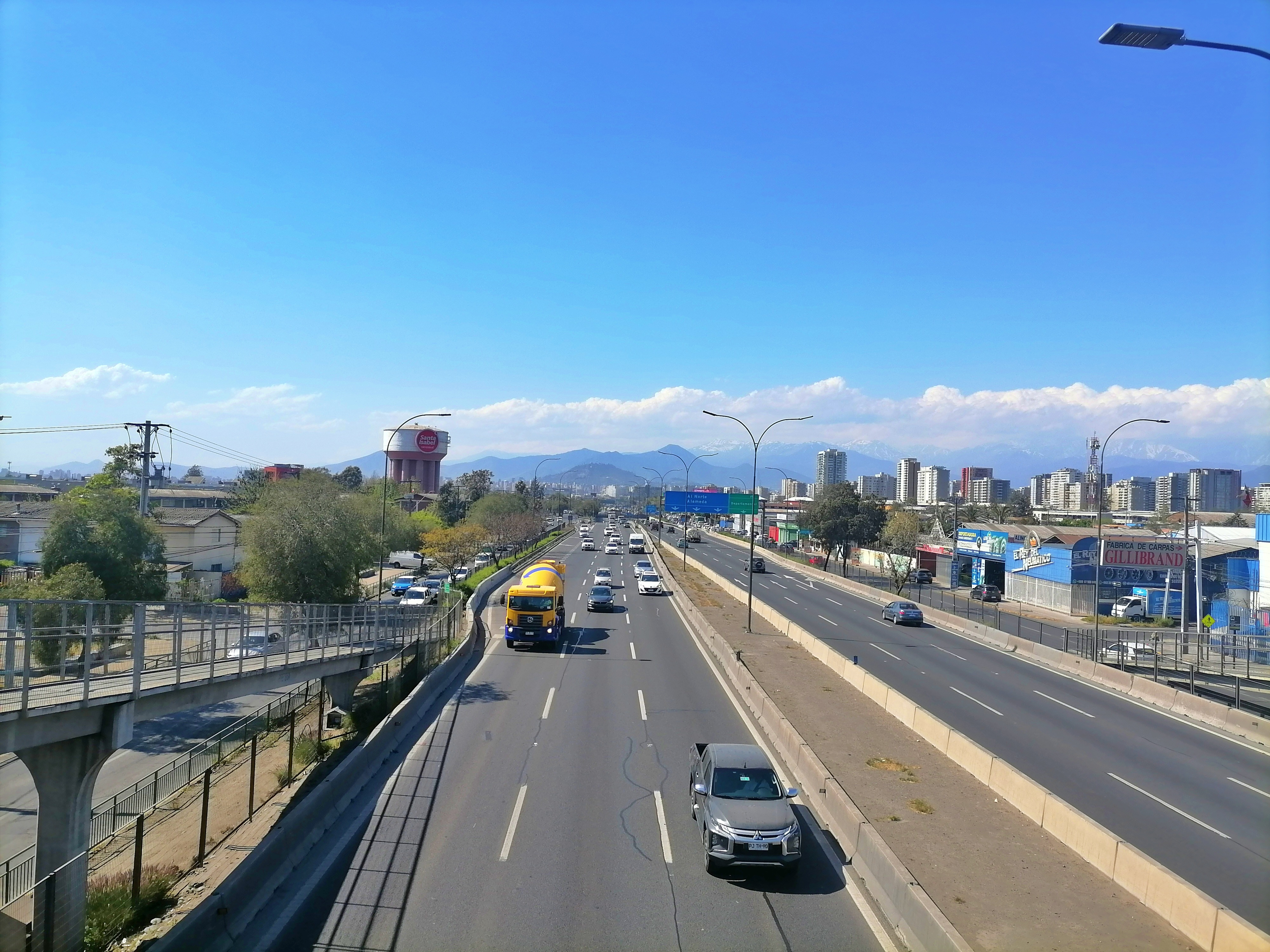
PAC at the left of Autopista Central in 2022

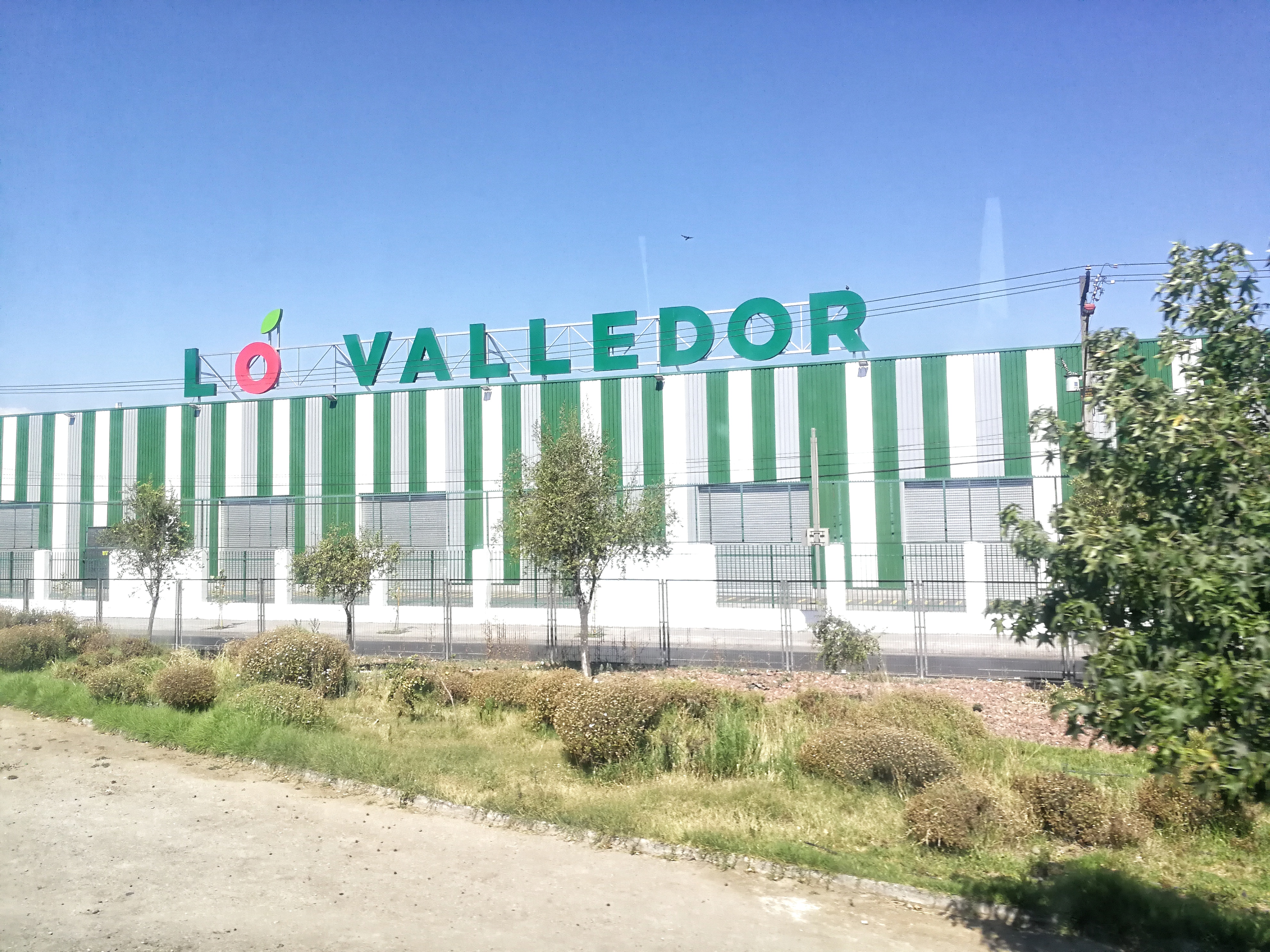
Lo Valledor market

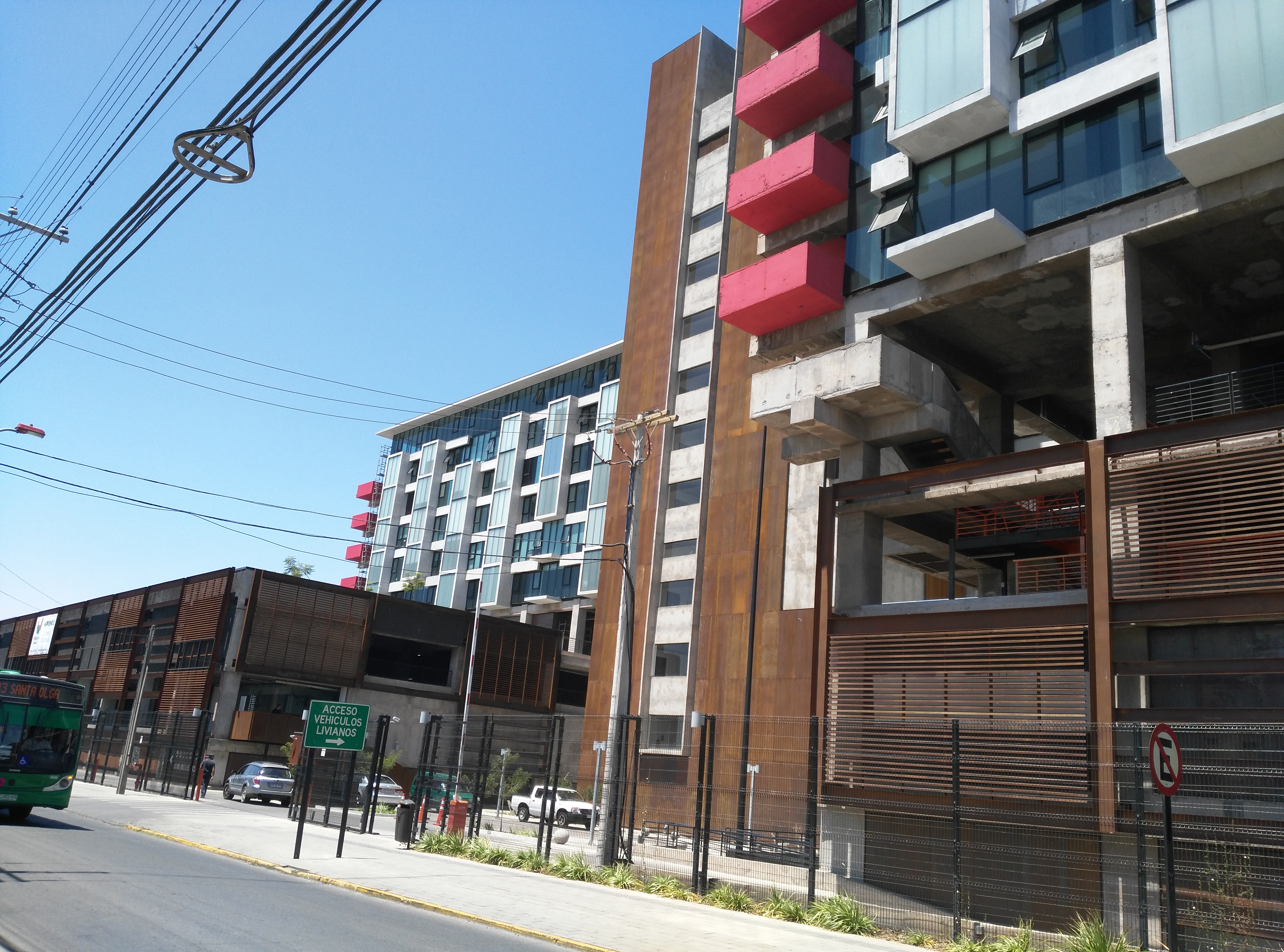
Ochagavia center

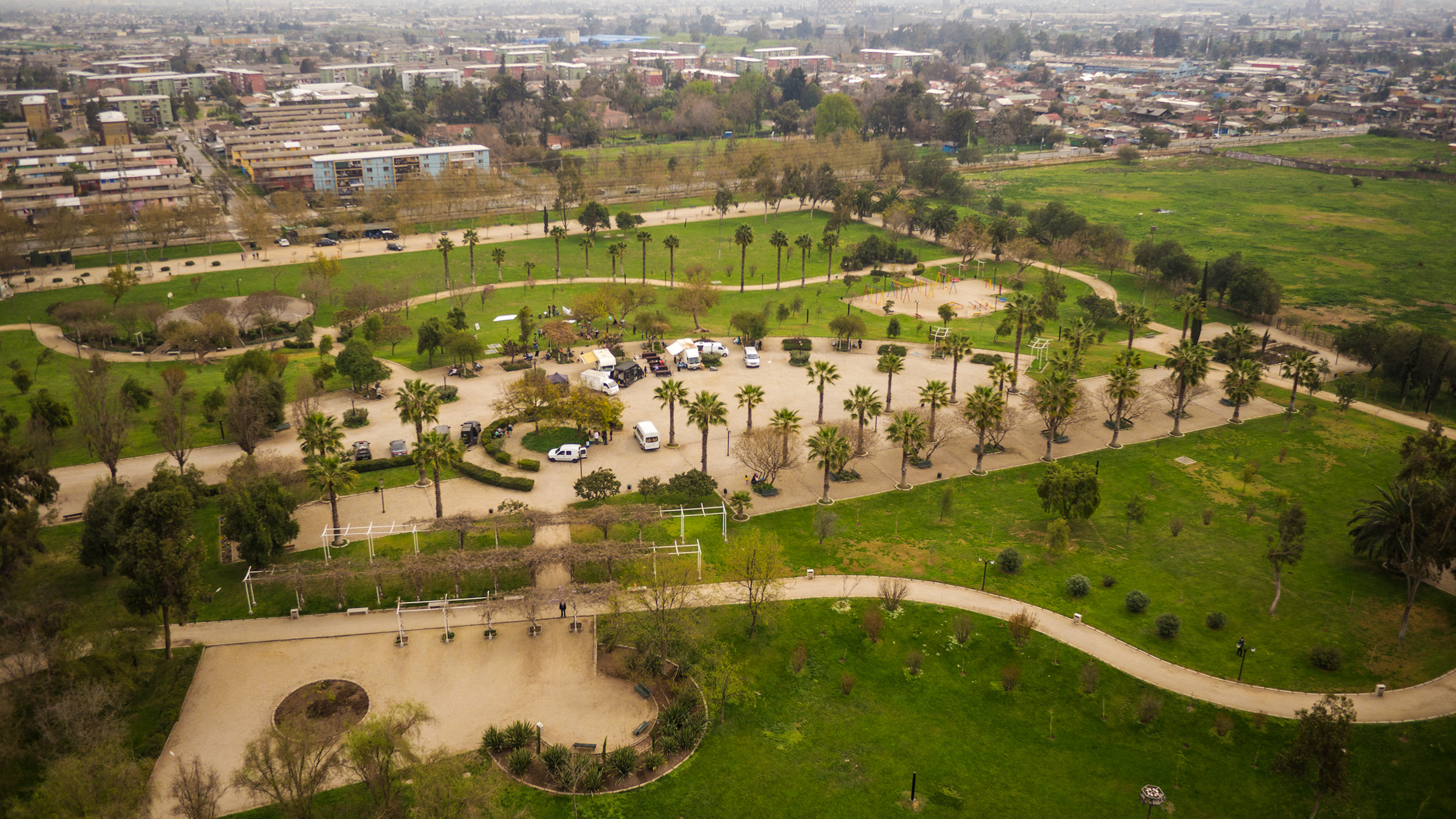
André Jarlán Park

== Administration ==
As a commune, Pedro Aguirre Cerda is a third-level administrative division of Chile administered by a municipal council, headed by an alcalde who is directly elected every four years. The 2012-2016 mayor was Claudina Núñez Jiménez (PCCh). During this period, the communal council had the following members:

- Gloria Rodríguez Calderón (PCCh)
- Juan Rozas Romero (Ind)
- Eduardo Pastene Azola (UDI)
- Elizabeth Jiménez Oliva (Ind)
- Carmen Salinas Jara (PPD)
- Eduardo Cancino Cáceres (PCCh)
- Rodrigo Lagos Fuentes (PDC)
- Manuel Aguilar Gálvez (RN)

Within the electoral divisions of Chile, Pedro Aguirre Cerda is represented in the Chamber of Deputies by Pedro Browne (RN) and Guillermo Teillier (PC) as part of the 28th electoral district, (together with San Miguel and Lo Espejo). The commune is represented in the Senate by Carlos Montes (PS) and Manuel José Ossandón (RN) as part of the 8th senatorial constituency (Santiago-East).

== Demographics ==
As of the 2024 census, the population is 96,062, of which 49.0% are males, and 51.0% are females. People aged under 15 years old make up 16.1% of the population, and people aged 65 years old and over make up 18.3%.

Historical population
Year	Pop.	±% p.a.
1970	141,592	—
1982	145,207	+0.21%
1992	130,441	−1.07%
2002	114,560	−1.29%
2017	101,174	−0.82%
2024	96,062	−0.74%
Source: INE, Memoria Chilena

- Average annual household income: US$28,199 (PPP, 2006)
- Population below poverty line: 6.3% (2006)
- Regional quality of life index: 81.08, high, 9 out of 52 (2005)
- Human Development Index: 0.708, 114 out of 341 (2003)

=== Ethnic minorities ===
As of the 2024 census, Indigenous peoples make up 8.6% of the population, and Afro-Chileans make up 1.2%.

=== Religion ===
As of the 2024 census, 69.8% of the population over 15 years old are Christians (48.2% Catholics, 18.7% Evangelicals or Protestants, and 2.9% other branches), 0.1% are Jews, 0.05% are Muslims, 0.1% are Buddhists, 0.02% are Hinduists, 1.0% are adrehents of other religions, and 29.0% are irreligious.

=== Immigration ===
As of the 2024 census, immigrants make up 9.9% of the population – 7.1% are from South America, 2.7% from North America, 0.1% from Europe, 0.05% from Asia, 0.002% from Africa, and 0.002% from Oceania.
