= Social Convergence =

Chilean political party

Social Convergence Convergencia Social
- Abbreviation: CS
- President: Diego Ibáñez
- Secretary-General: Javiera Menay
- Vice President: Francisca Perales
- Founder: Gabriel Boric
- Founded: 11 November 2018; 7 years ago
- Legalized: 9 March 2020; 6 years ago
- Dissolved: 1 July 2024; 20 months ago
- Merger of: Autonomist Movement; Socialism and Liberty; New Democracy; Libertarian Left (before 2019)
- Merged into: Broad Front
- Headquarters: Almirante Riveros 062, Providencia, Santiago
- Think tank: Fundación Decide; Fundación Crea
- Student wing: CS Student Front; Secondary CS
- Women's wing: CS Feminist Front
- Membership (2021): 36,119
- Ideology: Libertarian socialism; Progressivism; Anti-neoliberalism; Autonomism
- Political position: Left-wing
- National affiliation: Broad Front (2018–2024); Apruebo Dignidad (2021–2023)
- International affiliation: Progressive International
- Colours: Cyan; Purple; Light red
- Slogan: "Decide Involucrarte" ("Decide to Get Involved")

Website
- convergenciasocial.cl

The Social Convergence (Spanish: Convergencia Social, CS) was a left-wing political party in Chile. It was founded by the Chilean president Gabriel Boric.

It was co-founded in 2018 by the Autonomist Movement (MA), Libertarian Left (IL) (a part of the movement left the party in 2019), Socialism and Freedom (SOL) and New Democracy (ND). It was part of the leftist coalition Broad Front. In mid-2019, members of the movement began their process to register as a legally constituted political party.

Social Convergence experienced an internal crisis in 2019, after a large number of militants resigned from the party, due to the initial rejection of Gabriel Boric's participation in the agreement made by the congress to create a new constitution, initiated due to the 2019 Chilean protests. Arguing that the agreement did not seem to them to be a sufficient response to the protests. However, after the changes that the agreement underwent (gender parity, indigenous seats, etc.), these members ended up supporting the agreement, but did not remain part of the party.

In July 2024 the party merged into the Broad Front party, which is a successor of the Broad Front coalition.

== Authorities ==
=== President of the Republic ===
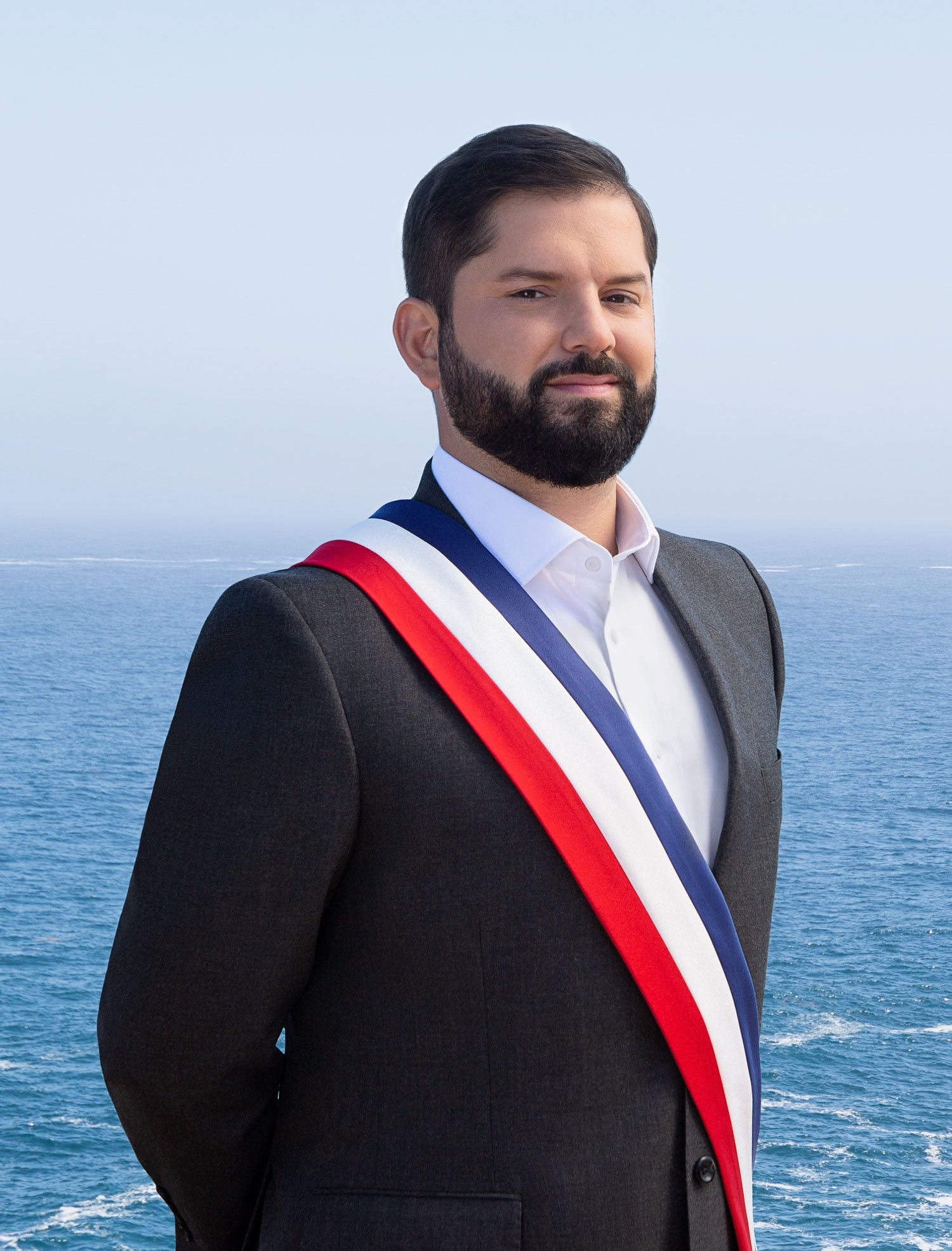
Gabriel Boric Font 2022-2026

=== Deputies ===
Name	Region	District	Period
Diego Ibáñez	Valparaíso	6	2018–2022 / 2022-2026
Francisca Bello	Valparaíso	6	2022-2026
Gonzalo Winter	Metropolitana	10	2018–2022 / 2022-2026
Lorena Fries	Metropolitana	10	2022-2026
Gael Yeomans	Metropolitana	13	2018–2022 / 2022-2026
Marcela Riquelme	O'Higgins	15	2022-2026
Mercedes Bulnes	Maule	17	2022-2026
Clara Sagardía	Bíobío	21	2022-2026
Patricio Rosas	Los Ríos	24	2018–2022 / 2022-2026
Javiera Morales	Magallanes	28	2022-2026

== Election results ==
=== Presidential elections ===
Election year	Candidate	1st Round		2nd Round		Results
Election year	Candidate	# Votes	% Votes	# Votes	% Votes	Results
2021	Gabriel Borić Font	1,815,024	25.8%	4,620,890	55.9%	Won

=== Congress election ===
Election year	Chamber of Deputies			Senate			Status
Election year	# Votes	% Votes	Seats	# Votes	% Votes	Seats	Status
2021	287,190	4.54%	9 / 155	59,489	1.28%	0 / 50	TBA

== See also ==
- Category:Social Convergence politicians
