= Lo Espejo =

- Commune
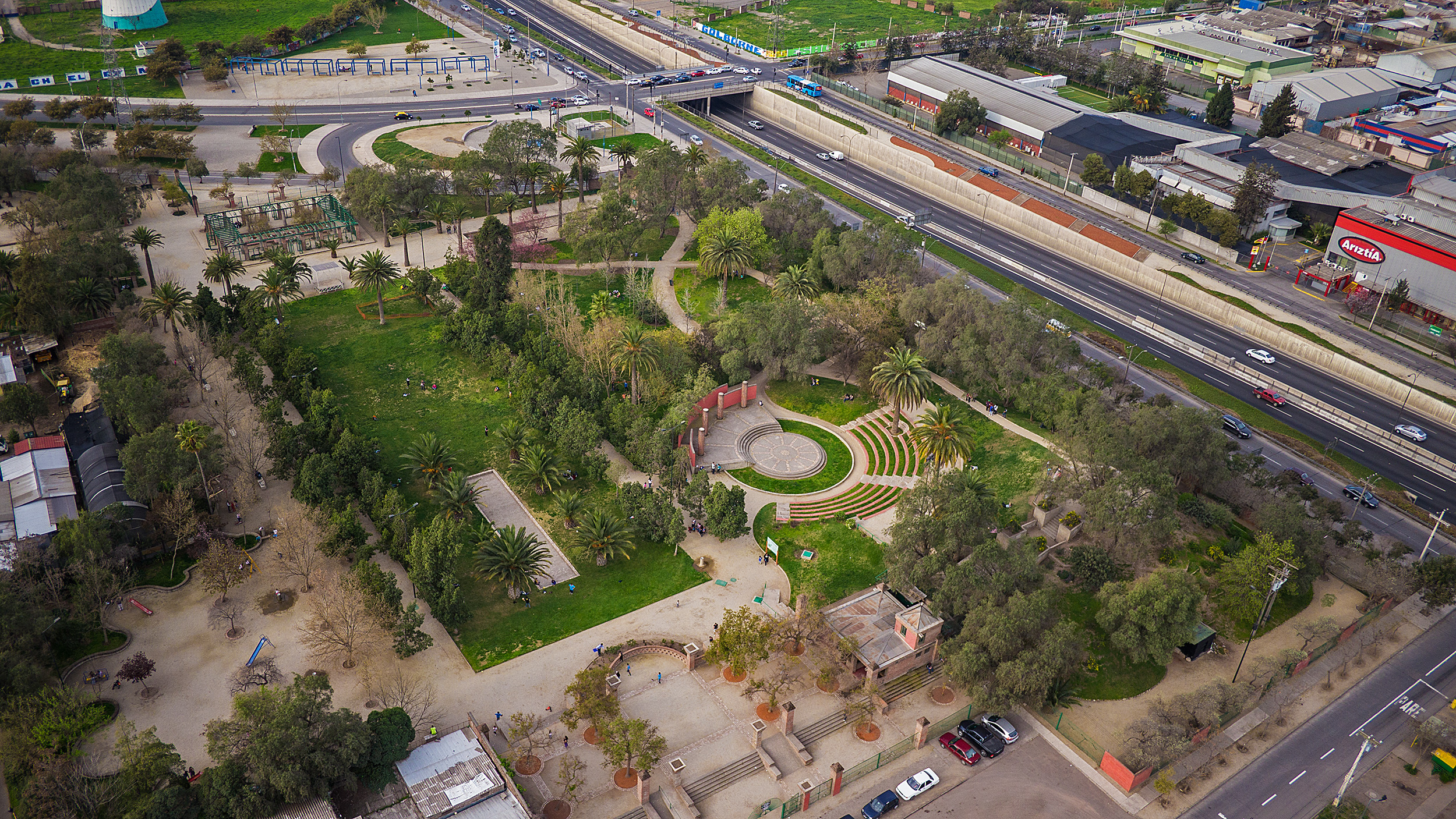
- Violeta Parra Park

- Map of Lo Espejo commune in Greater Santiago Location in Chile
- Coordinates (city): 33°31′S 70°41.5′W
- Country: Chile
- Region: Santiago Metropolitan Region
- Province: Santiago

Government
  - Type: Municipality
  - Alcalde: Javiera Reyes Jara (PCCh)

Area
  - Total: 7.2 km^{2} (2.8 sq mi)

Population (2024)
  - Total: 87,295
  - Density: 12,000/km^{2} (31,000/sq mi)
- Time zone: UTC-4 (CLT)
  - Summer (DST): UTC-3 (CLST)
- Area code: 56 +
- Website: Municipality of Lo Espejo

Lo Espejo is a commune in the Santiago Province of the Santiago Metropolitan Region in Chile, southwest of the city center of Santiago. It has 87,295 inhabitants.

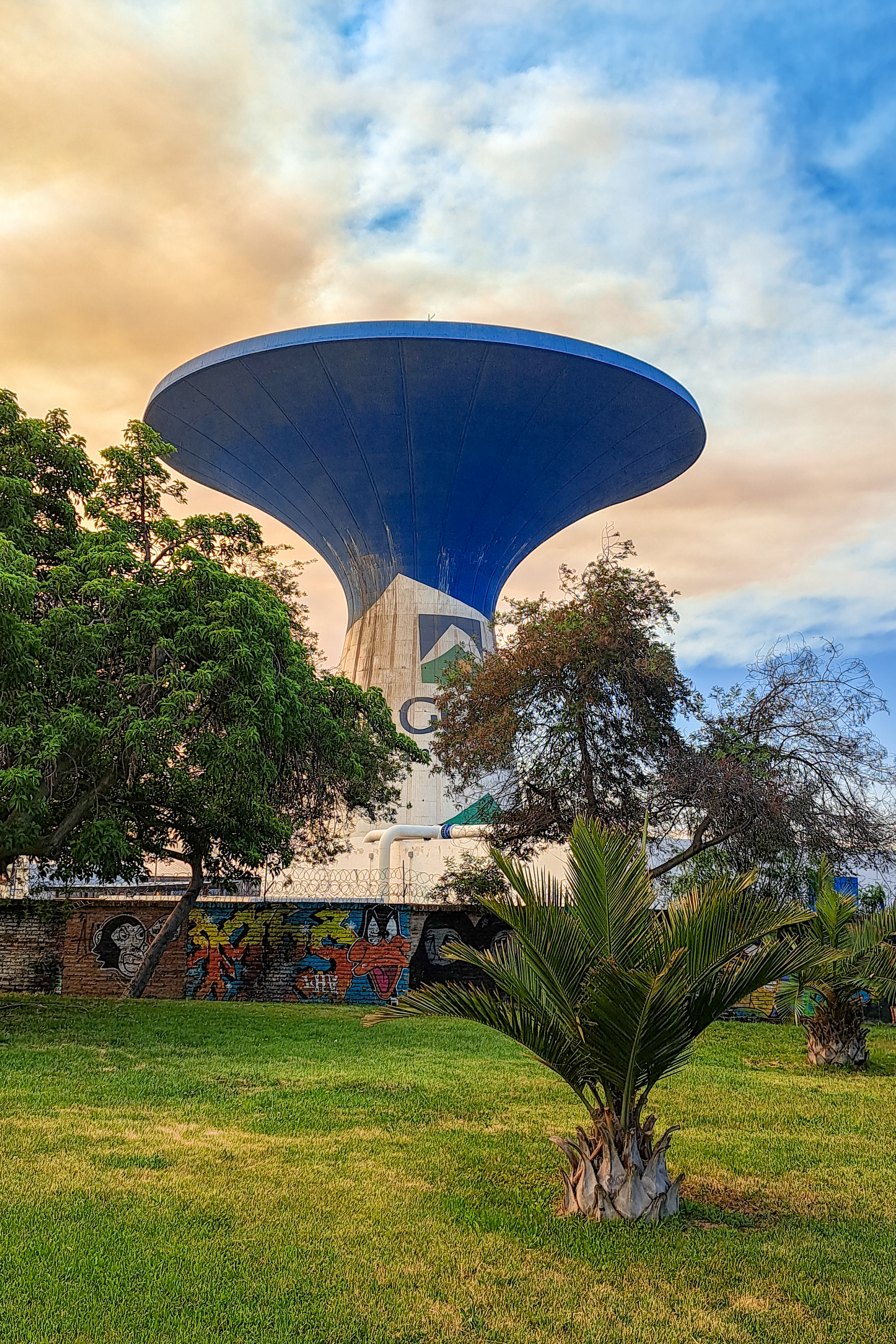
Aguas Andinas Water tower.

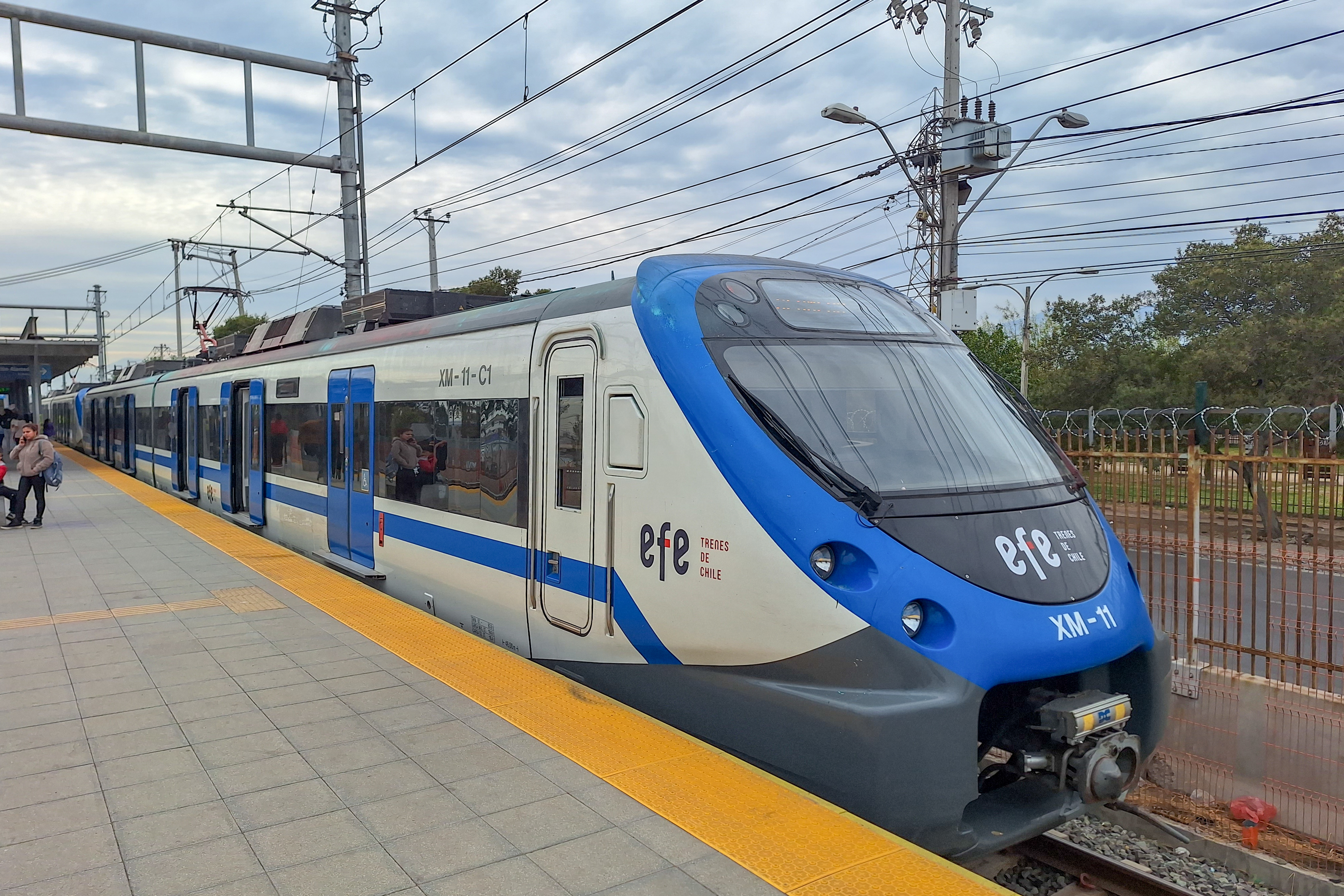
Lo Espejo Metrotrén station

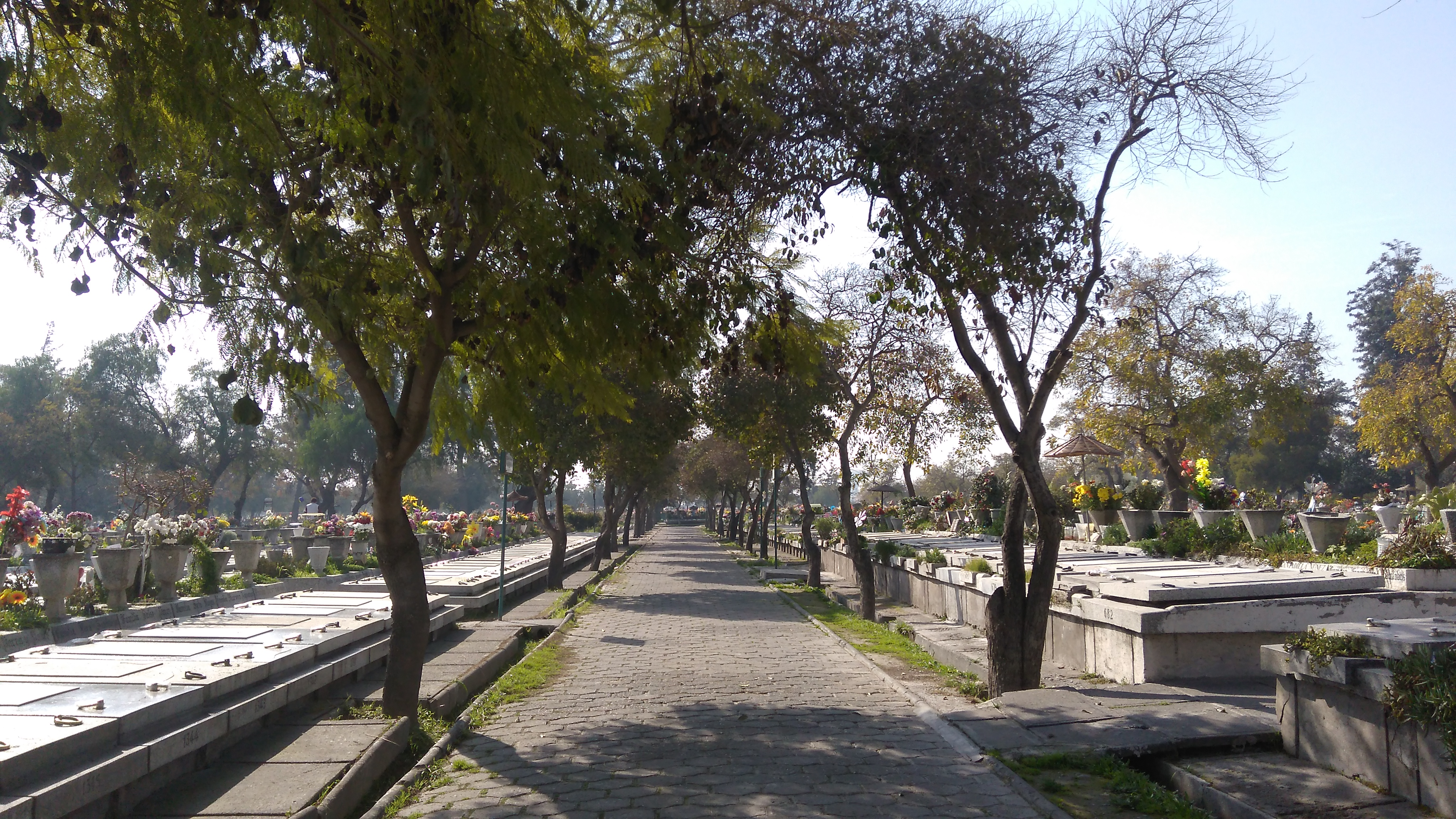
Metropolitan cementry of Santiago

== Administration ==
As a commune, Lo Espejo is a third-level administrative division of Chile administered by a municipal council, headed by an alcalde who is directly elected every four years. The 2024-2028 alcaldesa is Javiera Reyes Jara (PCCh). The communal council has the following members:

- Carolina Sagredo Ugarte (PCCh)
- Elizabeth Henríquez Leiva (PCCh)
- Francisca Ganga Zúñiga (Ind/PCCh)
- Javiera López Layana (FA)
- Cecilia Benavides León (UDI)
- Carolina Sagredo Ugarte (FRVS)
- Carlo Acosta de la Fuente (RN)
- Lorena Galleguillos Oliva (Ind/PS)

Within the electoral divisions of Chile, Lo Espejo is represented in the Chamber of Deputies by Pedro Browne (RN) and Guillermo Teillier (PC) as part of the 28th electoral district (together with Pedro Aguirre Cerda and San Miguel). The commune is represented in the Senate by Soledad Alvear (PDC) and Pablo Longueira (UDI) as part of the 8th senatorial constituency (Santiago-East).

== Demographics ==
As of the 2024 census, the population is 87,295, of which 49.4% are males, and 50.6% are females. People under 15 years old make up 17.6% of the population, and people over 65 years old make up 15.6%. 100% of the population is urban.

Historical population
Year	Pop.	±% p.a.
1970	89,823	—
1982	124,462	+2.76%
1992	120,075	−0.36%
2002	112,800	−0.62%
2017	98,804	−0.88%
2024	87,295	−1.75%
Source: INE, Memoria Chilena

- Average annual household income: US$23,881 (PPP, 2006)
- Population below poverty line: 20.1% (2006)
- Regional quality of life index: 71.90, mid-low, 36 out of 52 (2005)
- Human Development Index: 0.657, 226 out of 341 (2003)

=== Ethnic minorities ===
As of the 2024 census, Indigenous peoples make up 8.9% of the population, and Afro-Chileans make up 1.1%.

=== Religion ===
As of the 2024 census, 65.9% of the population over 15 years old are Christians (40.9% Catholics, 22.9% Evangelicals or Protestants, and 2.2% other branches), 0.1% are Jews, 0.1% are Muslims, 0.1% are Buddhists, 0.02% are Hinduists, 0.7% are adrehents of other religions, and 33.1% are irreligious.

=== Immigration ===
As of the 2024 census, immigrants make up 7.8% of the population - 4.9% are from South America, 2.8% from North America, 0.04% from Europe, 0.03% from Asia, 0.002% from Africa, and 0.002% from Oceania.
