= San Miguel, Chile =

Commune in Greater Santiago, Chile

San Miguel
- Commune
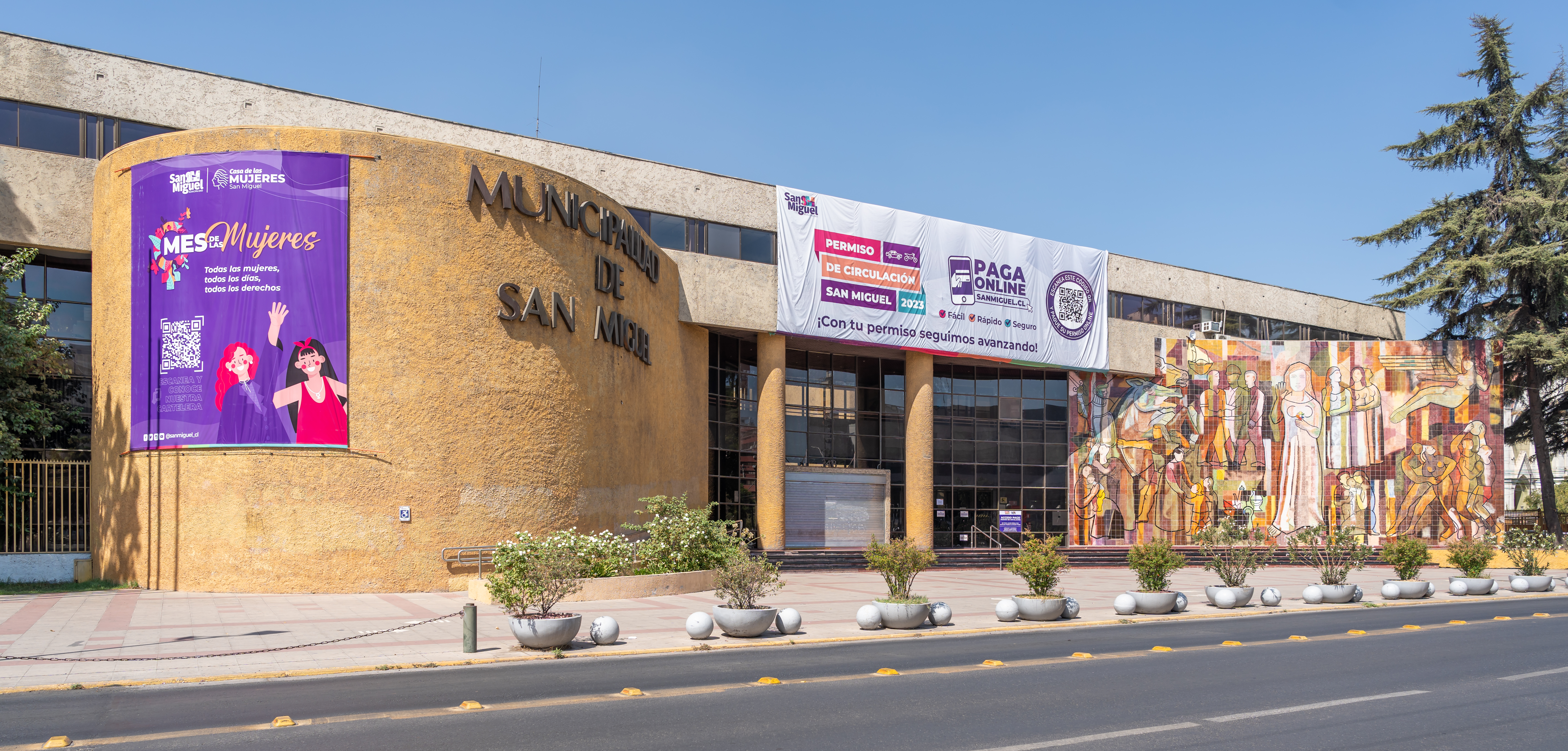
- City Hall

- Coat of arms Map of the San Miguel commune within Greater Santiago Location in Chile
- Coordinates (alcalde's office): 33°29′09″S 70°38′58″W
- Country: Chile
- Region: Santiago Metropolitan Region
- Province: Santiago
- Founded: 10 August 1896

Government
  - Type: Municipality
  - Alcalde: Carol Bown (UDI)

Area
  - Total: 9.5 km^{2} (3.7 sq mi)

Population (2024)
  - Total: 150,829
  - Density: 16,000/km^{2} (41,000/sq mi)
  - Urban: 150,829
  - Rural: 0
- Demonym(s): Sanmiguelino (m); Sanmiguelina (f)
- Time zone: UTC-4 (CLT)
  - Summer (DST): UTC-3 (CLST)
- Area code: 56 +
- Website: Municipality of San Miguel

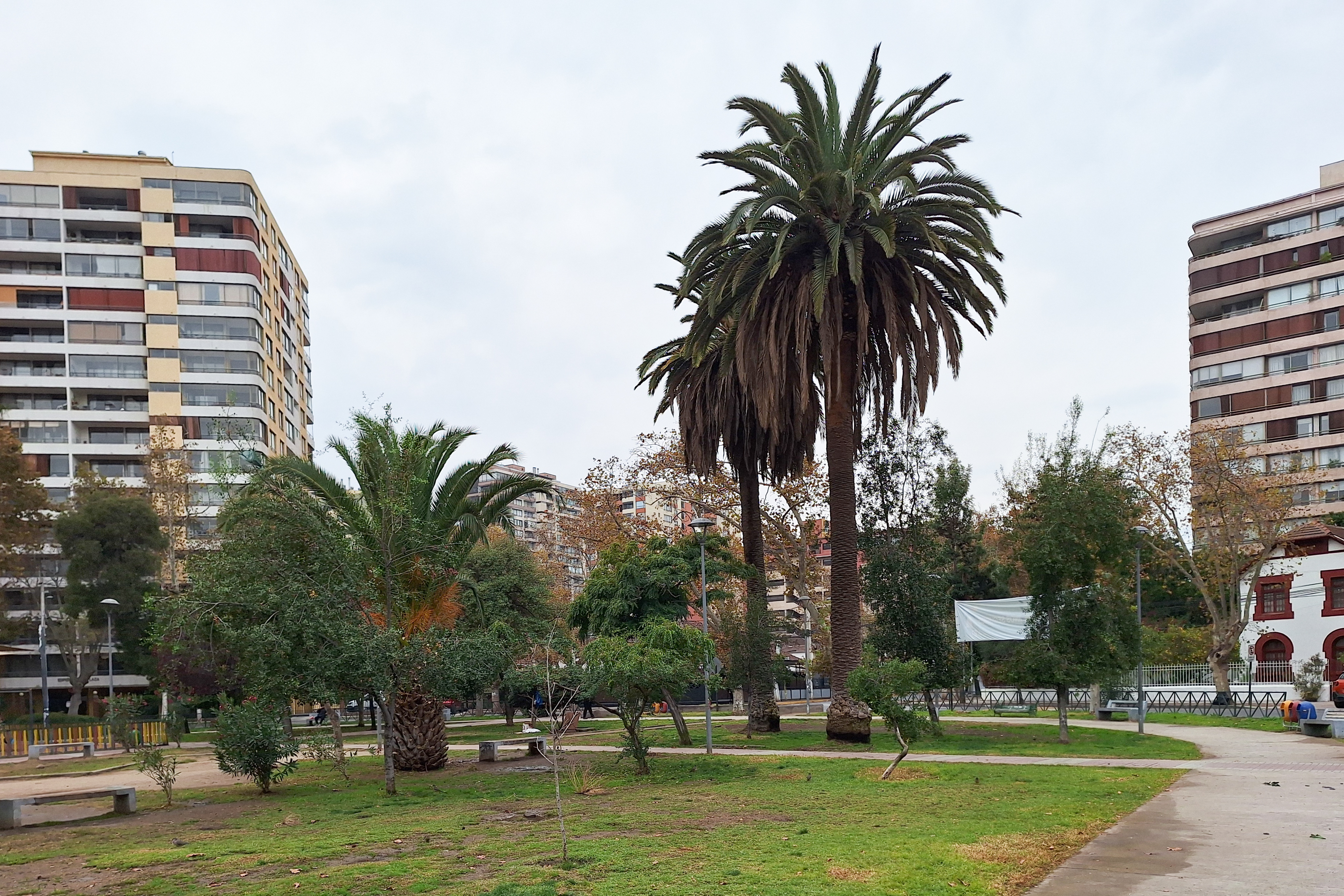
El Llano neighborhood

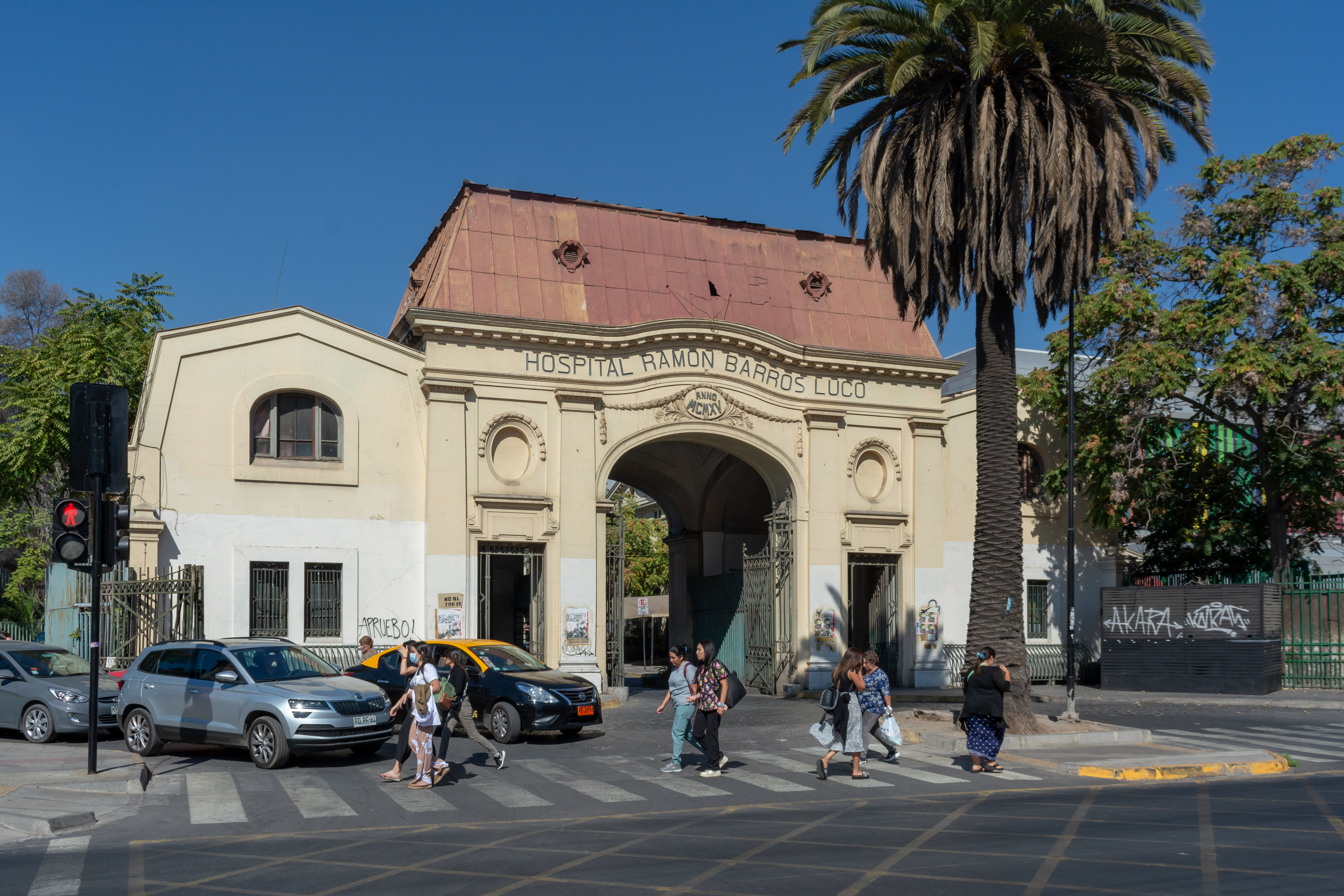
Barros Luco Hospital

San Miguel (Spanish for "Saint Michael") is a commune in the Santiago Province of the Santiago Metropolitan Region in Chile. It was founded on August 10, 1896. It has 150,829 inhabitants.

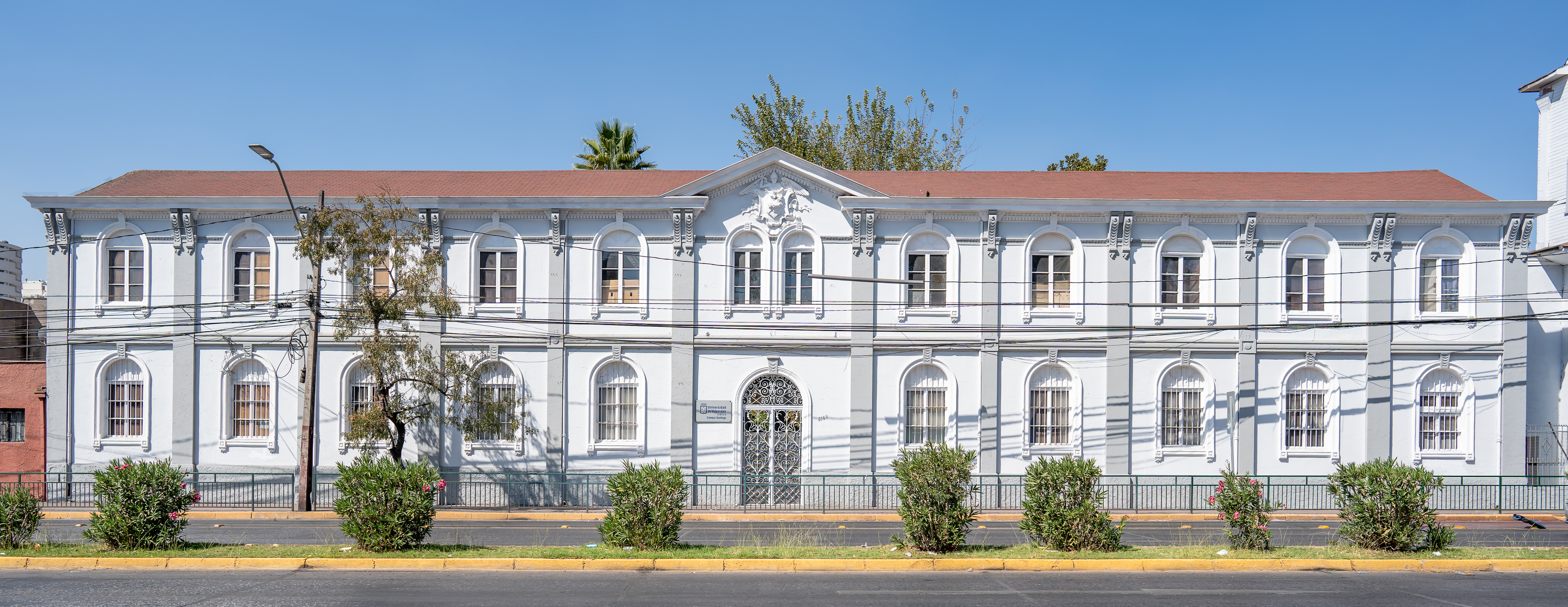
University of Valparaíso

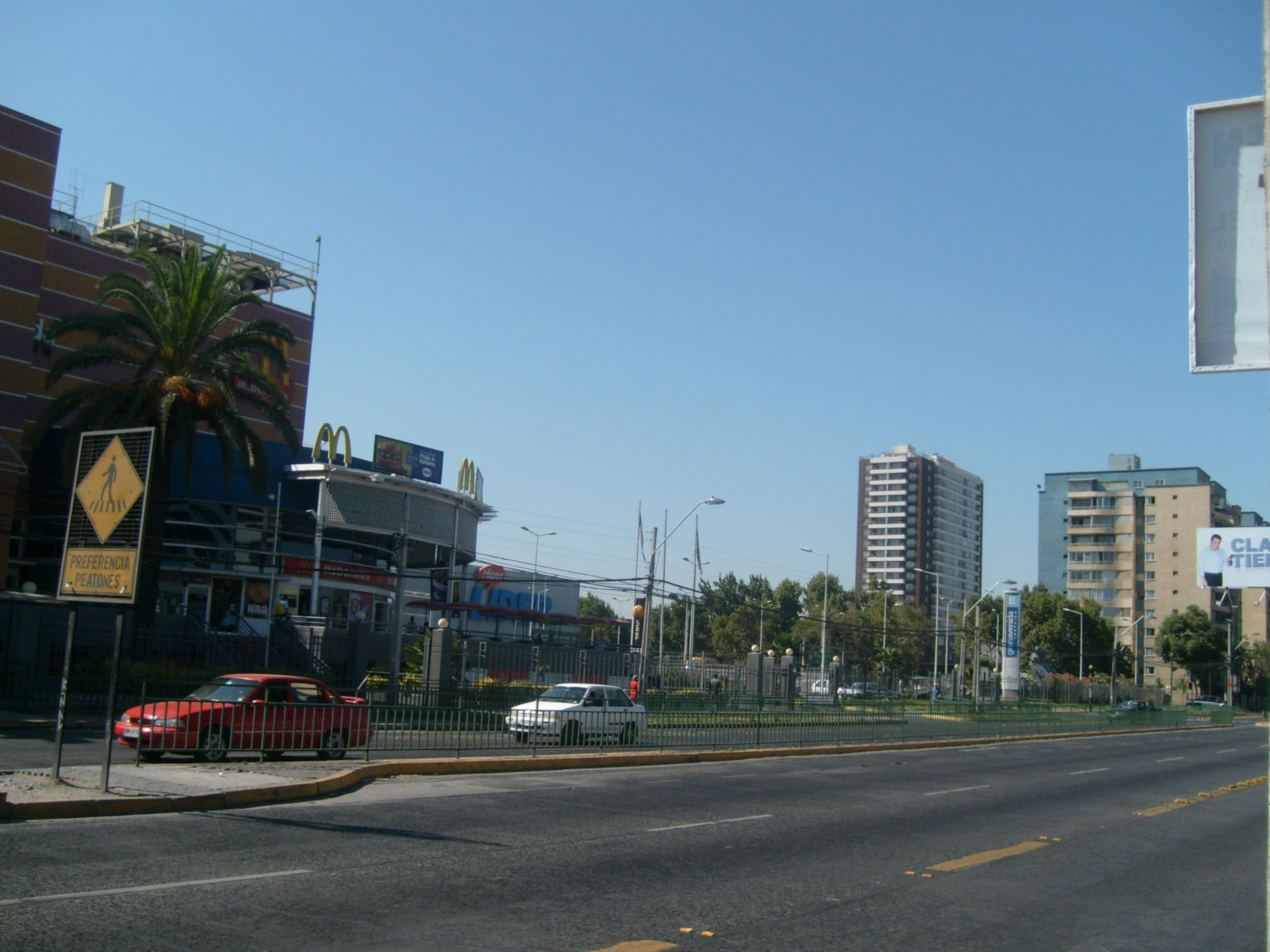
José Miguel Carrera Ave.

== History ==
The history of San Miguel dates back to the 16th century when Gaspar Banda, assistant to the conquistador Diego de Almagro, created a hermitage to Saint Michael the Archangel in this territory in 1575. In 1881, the Iglesia de San Miguel Arcángel was built on the same site as the 1575 hermitage.

At the beginning of the 19th century, the place emerged as an agricultural area, with wheat, barley and wine plantations. The land was owned by Bernardo O'Higgins, liberator and father of the Chilean nation, who used it as his vacation home.

Ramón Subercaseaux brought wine strains directly from Bordeaux, France, and his wines acquired international prestige, notably at the Exposition Universelle of 1889 in Paris. His 1840 house is still preserved as a cultural center and is open to the public.

The commune of San Miguel was founded on August 10, 1896. At the beginning of the 20th century, the area began to be urbanized in the style of a European garden city, with large mansions, parks, squares and many trees in the streets. In later years, development followed a more middle-class urban style.

In the civic square in front of the city hall, a statue of José Miguel Carrera. The statue was designed by Auguste Dumont, the same sculptor who made the statue of Napoleon on the Vendôme Column in Paris.

== Administration ==
As a commune, San Miguel is a third-level administrative division of Chile administered by a municipal council, headed by an alcalde who is directly elected every four years. The alcalde's office (alcaldía) is located at Gran Avenida No. 3418. The 2024–2028 alcalde is Carol Bown Sepúlveda (UDI). The communal council has the following members:

- Luis Sanhueza Bravo (RN)
- Felipe Guevara Stephens (RN)
- Claudia Rojas Miranda (UDI)
- Eva Merino Garcés (REP)
- Claudio Escobar Oyarzún (Ind)
- Gabriel Zúñiga Aravena (PS)
- Viviana Llambias Miranda (FA)
- Carla Santana Bustamante (PC)

San Miguel belongs to the 28th electoral division (together with Pedro Aguirre Cerda and Lo Espejo) and the 8th senatorial constituency (Santiago East). It is represented in the Chamber of Deputies of the National Congress by the deputies Guillermo Teillier del Valle (PCCh) and Pedro Browne Urrejola (RN). It is represented in the Senate by senators Soledad Alvear (PDC) and Pablo Longueira (UDI).

== Demographics ==
As of the 2024 census, the population is 150,829, of which 47.2% are male and 52.8% are female. People under 15 years old make up 15.6% of the population, and people over 65 years old make up 11.5%. 100% of the population is urban.

Historical population
Year	Pop.	±% p.a.
1970	93,784	—
1982	88,764	−0.46%
1992	82,869	−0.68%
2002	78,872	−0.49%
2017	107,954	+2.11%
2024	150,829	+4.89%
Source: INE, Memoria Chilena

- Average annual household income: US$39,670 (PPP, 2006)
- Population below poverty line: 2.5% (2006)
- Regional quality of life index: 82.17, high, 6 out of 52 (2005)
- Human Development Index: 0.765, 31 out of 341 (2003)

=== Immigration ===
As of the 2024 census, immigrants make up 26.0% of the population - 25.0% are from South America, 0.6% from North America, 0.2% from Europe, 0.1% from Asia, 0.01% from Africa, and 0.01% from Oceania.

== Notable people ==
- Los Prisioneros
- Gepe
- Paulina Urrutia
- Ruben Palma
- Themo Lobos
- Francisco Dominguez
- Daniela Vega
