= Tania Madriaga =

Chilean sociologist and politician

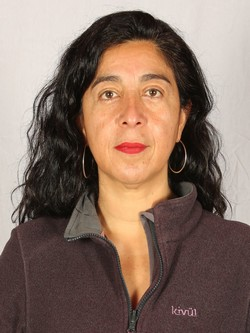

Member of the Constitutional Convention
- In office 4 July 2021 – 4 July 2022
- Constituency: 7th District

Adjunct Vice President of the Constitutional Convention
- In office 6 September 2021 – 8 September 2021
- Preceded by: Rodrigo Rojas Vade
- Succeeded by: Vacant

Personal details
- Born: 23 February 1972 (age 54) Nueva La Habana, Santiago, Chile
- Party: Social Convergence (2018−2019)
- Other political affiliations: Autonomist Movement (2016–2018); The List of the People (2021–2022)
- Spouse: Rodrigo Ruiz Encina
- Children: Two
- Education: University of Concepción (B.Sc); University of Chile (M.Sc)
- Occupation: Politician
- Profession: Sociologist

Tania Isabel Madriaga Flores (born 23 February 1972) is a Chilean politician, sociologist and former member of the Chilean Constitutional Convention.

After the false cancer of Rodrigo Rojas Vade, she assumed as vice-president of the convention. Nevertheless, she decided to resign two days later.

She previously served as Director of the Municipal Planning Secretariat (SECPLA) of Valparaíso between 2017 and 2020.

== Early life ==
Madriaga was born on 23 February 1972 in San Bernardo, Santiago, Chile. She is the daughter of Waldo Madriaga Contrera and Patricia Flores Gallardo.

== Professional career ==
She completed her primary and secondary education in Antwerp –Belgium–, Havana –Cuba–, and Chile, as her family went into exile in 1979, returning to the country in 1986.

In 1993 she began her studies in Sociology at the University of Concepción, graduating as a sociologist. She later earned a master's degree in Social Sciences, with a specialization in Sociology of Modernization, from the University of Chile.

Her academic training also includes diplomas in Public policies and local management for the prevention of alcohol and drug consumption and trafficking and in Strategic management of associative and cooperative organizations, both obtained at the University of Chile.

Professionally, she worked in several Chilean municipalities, including Renca, La Reina, Pedro Aguirre Cerda, and Ñuñoa. In 2017, she assumed responsibility for coordinating the reconstruction of the Puertas Negras sector following the major fire that affected Valparaíso on 2 January of that year.

She also served as Director of the Municipal Planning Secretariat (SECPLA) of Valparaíso from 2017 to 2020, during the first administration of Mayor Jorge Sharp.

== Political career ==
In the elections held on 15 and 16 May 2021, Madriaga ran as an independent candidate for the Constitutional Convention representing the 7th District of the Valparaíso Region, as part of the Lista del Pueblo.

She obtained 15,020 votes, corresponding to 4.53% of the valid votes cast.

In July 2022, she returned to work in the Municipality of Valparaíso, assuming an administrative position within the Communal Planning Secretariat (SECPLA).
