= 2022 proposed Political Constitution of the Republic of Chile =

Failed 2022 draft constitution of Chile

Proposed Political Constitution of the Republic of Chile
- Official version published by the Constitutional Convention on 4 July 2022
- Created: 4 July 2021 – 4 July 2022
- Ratified: Rejected by referendum, 4 September 2022
- Location: Santiago
- Author: Constitutional Convention of Chile
- Purpose: Proposed replacement of the 1980 Constitution

The proposed Political Constitution of the Republic of Chile of 2022 was a draft constitution written by the Constitutional Convention of Chile between 4 July 2021 and 4 July 2022, intended to replace the 1980 Constitution enacted under the military dictatorship of Augusto Pinochet. An early draft was released on 14 May 2022, and the final text was formally delivered to President Gabriel Boric on 4 July 2022.

The Constitutional Convention that drafted the proposal was the first constituent body in the world elected with full gender parity, and it reserved seats for representatives of Chile's indigenous peoples. The resulting text proposed a shift from the subsidiary state model of the 1980 Constitution toward a welfare state, declared Chile a plurinational and ecological state, expanded human rights guarantees, granted greater autonomy to the regions, and replaced the Senate with a weaker Chamber of Regions.

The proposal was submitted to a mandatory national referendum on 4 September 2022, in which it was rejected by roughly 62 percent of voters to 38 percent, with more than 13 million Chileans casting ballots — the highest turnout in the country's electoral history at the time. Analysts attributed the outcome to a combination of factors, including low approval of the Boric government, economic uncertainty, the length and perceived radicalism of the text, and unease over provisions such as plurinationality and the abolition of the Senate. Following the rejection, Chile's Congress launched a second, more moderate constitution-drafting process, whose resulting text was likewise rejected by voters in December 2023, after which the 1980 Constitution, as amended, remained in force.

== Background ==
Since the 1980 Constitution was enacted by the military government, critics had questioned its democratic legitimacy, the deficiencies of a text drafted without broad citizen participation, and the high quorums it imposed on subsequent reform. Calls to replace the constitution recurred throughout the post-dictatorship period: the Concertación de Partidos por la Democracia initially pursued reform rather than replacement, both candidates in the 1999 Concertación presidential primaries raised the idea of a plebiscite on constitutional matters, and during the 2009 election Eduardo Frei Ruiz-Tagle and Jorge Arrate both proposed a "new Constitution" to expand social rights. Major reforms were carried out during Ricardo Lagos's presidency in 2005, and the "Marca AC" campaign renewed public attention to the issue during the 2013 election. Michelle Bachelet's second term (2014–2018) launched a citizen-led constituent process that produced a draft new constitution, which was sent to Congress near the end of her term; her successor, Sebastián Piñera, announced he would not continue the project and would instead seek to "modify and perfect" the existing charter.

=== 2019–2020 social unrest and the agreement for a new constitution ===
The immediate origin of the proposal lay in the estallido social. A new constitution drafted by an elected constituent assembly became a recurring demand at protests and citizen town-hall meetings (cabildos) held nationwide in late 2019. Social leaders, analysts, and politicians argued that a new charter was needed to channel the protesters' demands, and, under pressure from the public and members of his own coalition, President Piñera eventually acknowledged the possibility of a substantial constitutional overhaul.

On 13–14 November 2019, ruling-party and opposition lawmakers negotiated over how a new constituent process should be organized and how citizens would participate in it, weighing a fully elected "Constitutional Convention" against a "Mixed Constitutional Convention" made up equally of sitting legislators and directly elected members; the central disputes concerned the quorum needed to approve articles and what would happen if a provision failed to pass. The negotiations concluded on 15 November 2019 with the signing of the "Agreement for Social Peace and the New Constitution" by party leaders from across the political spectrum at the former National Congress building in Santiago. Congress advanced the enabling reform in the following weeks — presented for urgent debate on 6 December and approved by the Senate, after the Chamber of Deputies, on 19 December 2019.

=== 2020 entry plebiscite ===
A national plebiscite held on 25 October 2020 (postponed from an original date in April 2020 because of the COVID-19 pandemic) asked voters whether Chile should draft a new constitution and, if so, which body should write it. The "Approve" option won with 78.27 percent of the vote, and voters chose the fully elected Constitutional Convention over the mixed alternative. Marking the occasion, Piñera described the vote as the beginning of a shared path toward a new constitution meant to unify, rather than divide, the country.

== Constitutional Convention ==
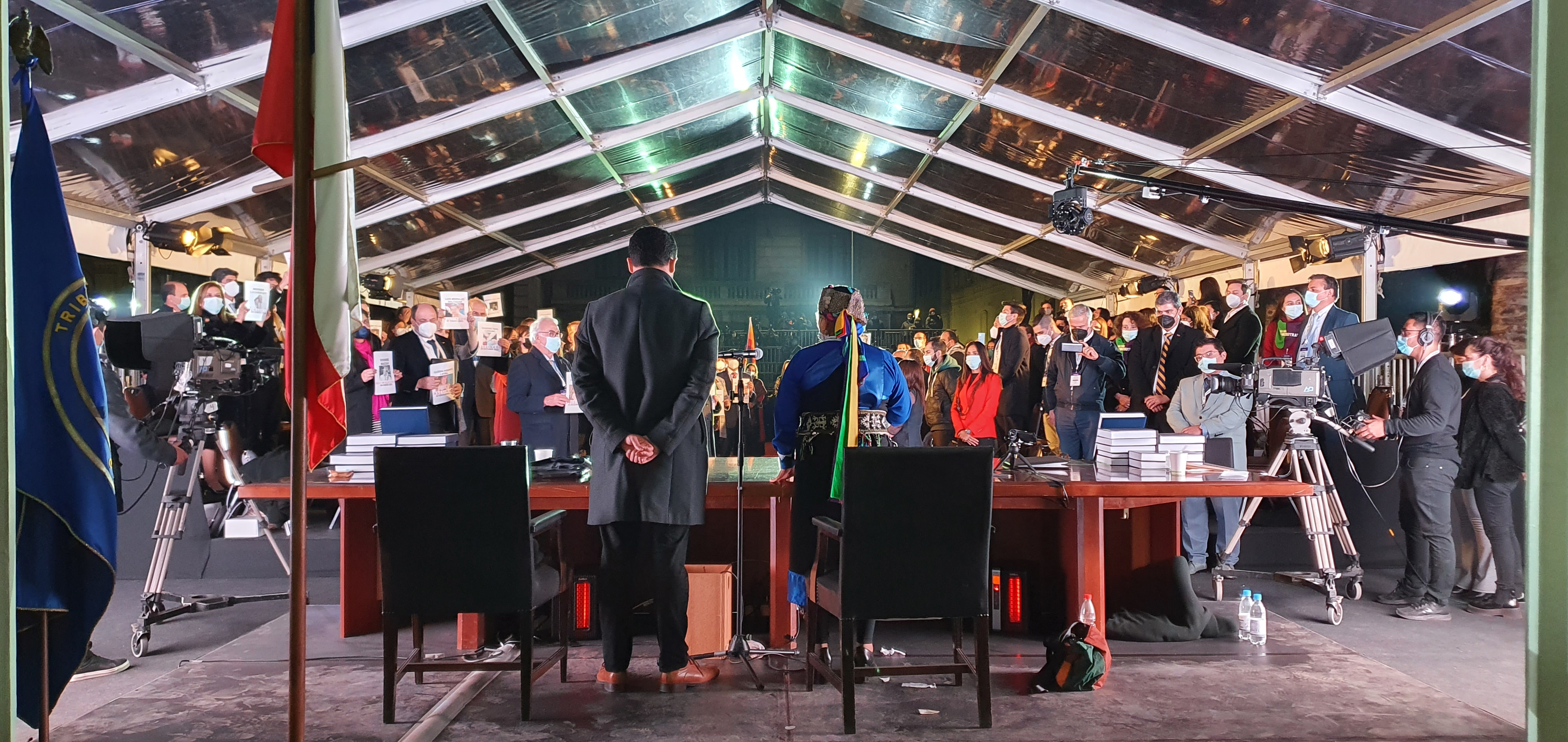
The inaugural session of the Constitutional Convention, 4 July 2021

The Constitutional Convention was the body specially elected to draft the proposal, under Chapter XV of the 1980 Constitution; its sole mandate was to produce a draft text, without assuming the powers of other state institutions. Its 155 members were elected on 15–16 May 2021, under a call to election formalized by decree on 24 November 2020.

The Convention comprised 78 men and 77 women, making it the first constituent assembly in the world elected with full gender parity. Seventeen seats were reserved for representatives of Indigenous peoples: seven for the Mapuche, two for the Aymara, and one each for the Kawésqar, Rapanui, Yagán, Quechua, Atacameño, Diaguita, Colla, and Chango peoples. Among its members were 59 lawyers, 7 law students, 20 academics, 9 engineers, and 5 journalists; six were former members of the National Congress and nine were former government officials. Eight members openly identified as LGBT: five gay men, one lesbian, one pansexual person, and one bisexual person.

The Convention's inaugural session was held on 4 July 2021 at the former National Congress building, a date chosen to coincide with the 210th anniversary of the installation of Chile's first National Congress; special health measures were imposed for the ceremony because of the pandemic. Delegates elected Mapuche linguist and academic Elisa Loncón as the Convention's first president, a choice widely reported as a symbolic gesture toward Chile's Indigenous peoples and toward gender parity; Jaime Bassa was elected vice-president.

The plenary approved the Convention's general regulations on 14 September 2021, deciding that individual articles of those regulations would be adopted by simple majority. Substantive debate on the new constitution's content began on 18 October 2021, two years after the start of the social unrest. The draft presented in May 2022 was organized into eight chapters produced by eight thematic commissions, covering the foundations of democracy, Chile's character as a plurinational state and the self-determination of its peoples, constitutional principles, fundamental rights, the environment, justice systems, knowledge systems, and the rights of Indigenous peoples. The first draft ran to 499 articles; after revision by a Harmonization Commission, the final text delivered on 4 July 2022 contained 388 articles plus 57 transitory provisions.

== 2022 exit plebiscite ==
The proposal was submitted to a mandatory "exit plebiscite" on 4 September 2022. More than 13 million people voted — about 86 percent of the electoral roll, the highest turnout of any election in Chilean history to that point — and the "Reject" option won with roughly 61.9 percent of valid votes against about 38.1 percent for "Approve." Rejection prevailed in all 16 of Chile's regions and in the great majority of its communes, including in President Boric's home region of Magallanes and in metropolitan Santiago. Votes cast by Chileans abroad went the opposite way, favoring "Approve" by roughly 61 to 39 percent.

Commentators pointed to several intertwined causes for the rejection: low approval ratings for the Boric government, an economic slowdown, and uncertainty over how the proposed changes would be implemented. The concept of plurinationality, which some voters read as dividing the country into separate national groups rather than affirming a single Chilean nation, drew particular criticism, as did the proposed elimination of the Senate — an institution dating to the country's founding — and an "unlimited parity" provision that critics argued could tip gender balance in state bodies toward female predominance. Some sectors of the opposition argued the draft pulled the country too far to the left, was too long and ambitious to be workable, and embedded values associated with younger generations that did not reflect the priorities of more traditional voters. Polling throughout 2022 had consistently shown the proposal trailing, with approval never exceeding about 38 percent in surveys conducted after March of that year.

== Content ==
The proposed text opened with a preamble approved by the Constitutional Convention, describing the document as freely granted by the people of Chile — made up of various nations — through a participatory, parity-based, and democratic process. The remaining content was distributed across eleven chapters, followed by a set of transitory provisions.

=== General principles and provisions ===
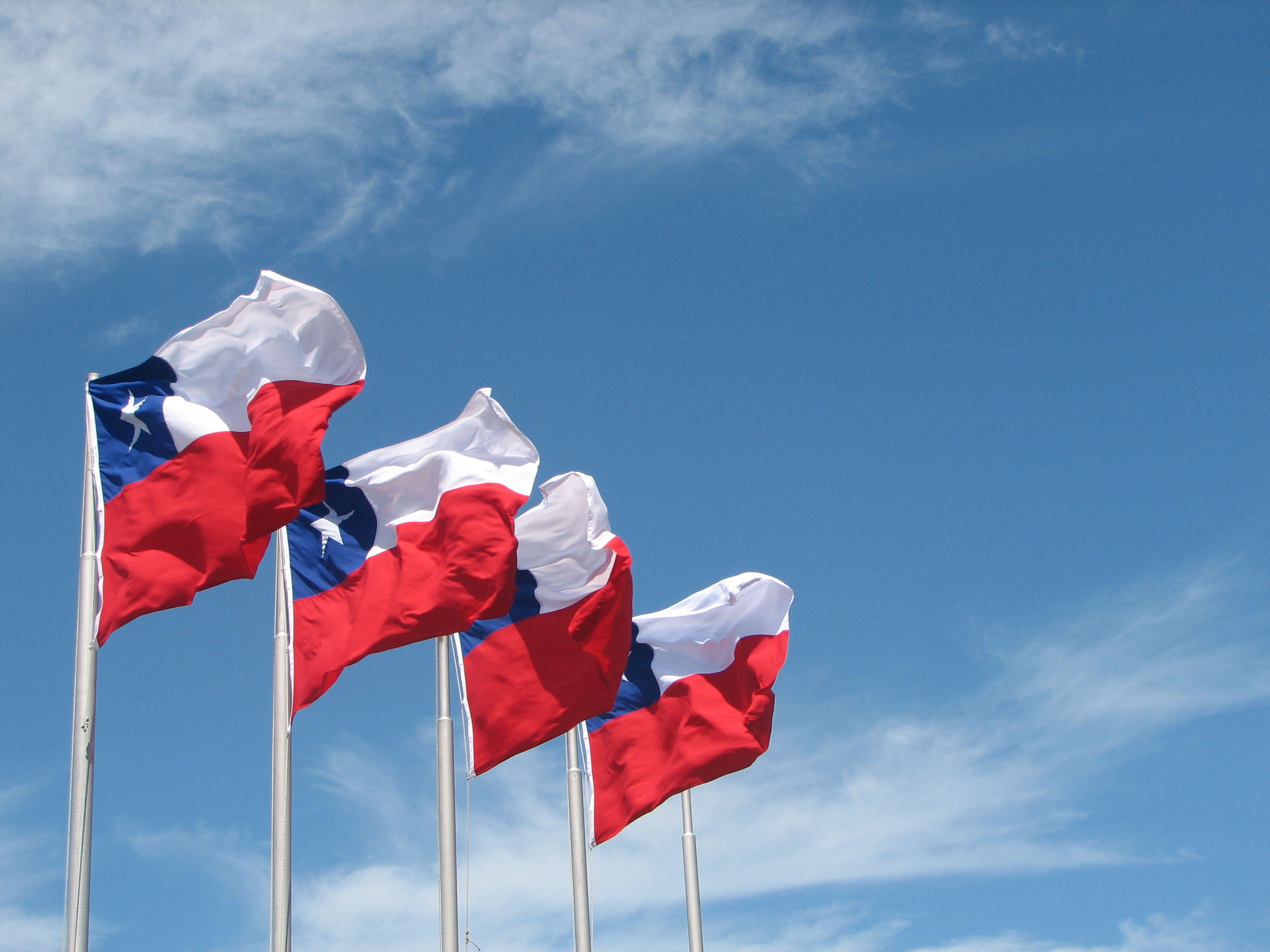
Chapter I described Chile, in its diversity, as forming a single, indivisible territory, and named the flag, coat of arms, and national anthem as national emblems

Chapter I (Articles 1–16) set out the foundational principles of the Chilean state: its role, its relationship with individuals, and the distribution of power across its territory. It established the state's social and welfare orientation, its plurinational and ecological character, the basis of sovereignty, and a commitment to human rights as underlying all state action. It affirmed the unity of the national territory while preserving internal autonomy for its constituent territories, guaranteed liberty and equality before the law, recognized equitable participation of women, men, and sexual and gender minorities in positions of power, established the secular character of the state, recognized all forms of family, set out the country's official language and national emblems, and defined the hierarchy of international treaties. The chapter also declared the Constitution's binding legal force over every person, institution, and state body.

=== Bill of rights ===
Chapter II (Articles 17–126), the longest in the proposal, held that the purpose of rights was to secure a dignified life, democracy, peace, and ecological balance, and recognized individuals, Indigenous nations, and nature itself as holders of both individual and collective rights, committing the state to remove barriers to their exercise. Guarantees included the right to life, personal integrity, and a prohibition on the death penalty, torture, enforced disappearance, slavery, human trafficking, and exile; rights to truth, justice, memory, and reparation for human-rights violations; equality before the law and non-discrimination, including on grounds of sexual orientation and gender identity; progressive autonomy for children and adolescents; universal accessibility and recognition of neurodiversity; rights to education (including sex education), health, social security, decent work, and recognition of domestic and care work; a right to adequate housing and to the city; food sovereignty; rights to water, sanitation, and energy; sexual and reproductive rights, including bodily autonomy; a right to a dignified death; rights to privacy, asylum, association, and public protest; property rights, including recognition of Indigenous property; freedom of enterprise and expression; digital rights, including access to connectivity and protection of personal data; cultural, artistic, and intellectual-property rights; a right to a healthy environment and to nature's regeneration; and guarantees of access to justice and due process. The chapter also set requirements for Chilean nationality and citizenship, recognized rights of Chileans living abroad, provided for judicial protection against unlawful detention and compensation for wrongful imprisonment, and created a national Ombudsman and a separate Children's Rights Ombudsman to safeguard the rights recognized elsewhere in the text.

=== Nature and the environment ===
Chapter III (Articles 127–150) recognized nature as a holder of rights, established mechanisms to protect it and penalize harm to it, and set out a waste-management system and the ecological and social function of land. It recognized animals as sentient beings entitled to special protection from mistreatment, and it designated certain goods — the territorial sea and seabed, beaches, waters, glaciers, wetlands, geothermal fields, the atmosphere, high mountain areas, protected areas, native forests, and the subsoil — as inappropriable common goods. The chapter also created a National Water Agency, a minerals statute, and a "Defender of Nature."

=== Democratic participation ===
Chapter IV (Articles 151–164) defined the exercise of democracy in Chile as direct, participatory, community-based, and representative, and established the basis of the Electoral Service. It guaranteed rights to direct citizen participation on matters of public interest, allowed regional and local governments to call referendums, and created popular legislative initiatives (requiring 3 percent of the electoral roll to propose a law and 5 percent to repeal one). Suffrage was defined as universal, equal, free, direct, personal, and secret — compulsory from age eighteen and voluntary for sixteen- and seventeen-year-olds and Chileans living abroad. The chapter also set rules for political parties, required gender parity in elected bodies with electoral lists headed by women, reserved seats for Indigenous peoples, and called for eradicating gender-based violence within political parties.

=== Good governance and public administration ===
Chapter V (Articles 165–186) established principles of probity, transparency, and accountability for public administration, created a Council for Transparency, and set penalties for corruption while providing protections for whistleblowers. It barred people convicted of crimes against humanity, sexual offenses, domestic violence, or corruption-related crimes from holding elected or public office, created a civil service for public officials, and established a commission to set the pay of elected authorities. The chapter also addressed firefighting services, the tax system (including national port policy), state participation in the economy, requirements for public enterprises, and principles of fiscal sustainability aligned with environmental protection.

=== Regional state and territorial organization ===
Chapter VI (Articles 187–250) organized the state territorially into autonomous entities and special territories, granting political, administrative, and financial autonomy to communes, provinces, and regions, and creating Indigenous territorial autonomies with their own legal personality and powers of self-governance, bounded by human and nature rights. Communes were to be governed by a mayor and municipal council elected by simple majority, supported by a consultative communal social assembly. At the regional level, the chapter created a council of mayors, a regional government led by a directly elected governor, a regional assembly with normative and oversight powers, a regional social council, and an advisory Council of Governors. It also established special-territory status for Rapa Nui (Easter Island), the Juan Fernández Archipelago, and Chilean Antarctica.

=== Legislative branch ===
Chapter VII (Articles 251–278) replaced the existing bicameral Congress with an asymmetric bicameral system consisting of an indirectly elected Chamber of Regions and a directly elected Congress of Deputies, both serving four-year terms with a single permitted re-election, and set out the legislative procedure and requirements for office.

=== Executive branch ===
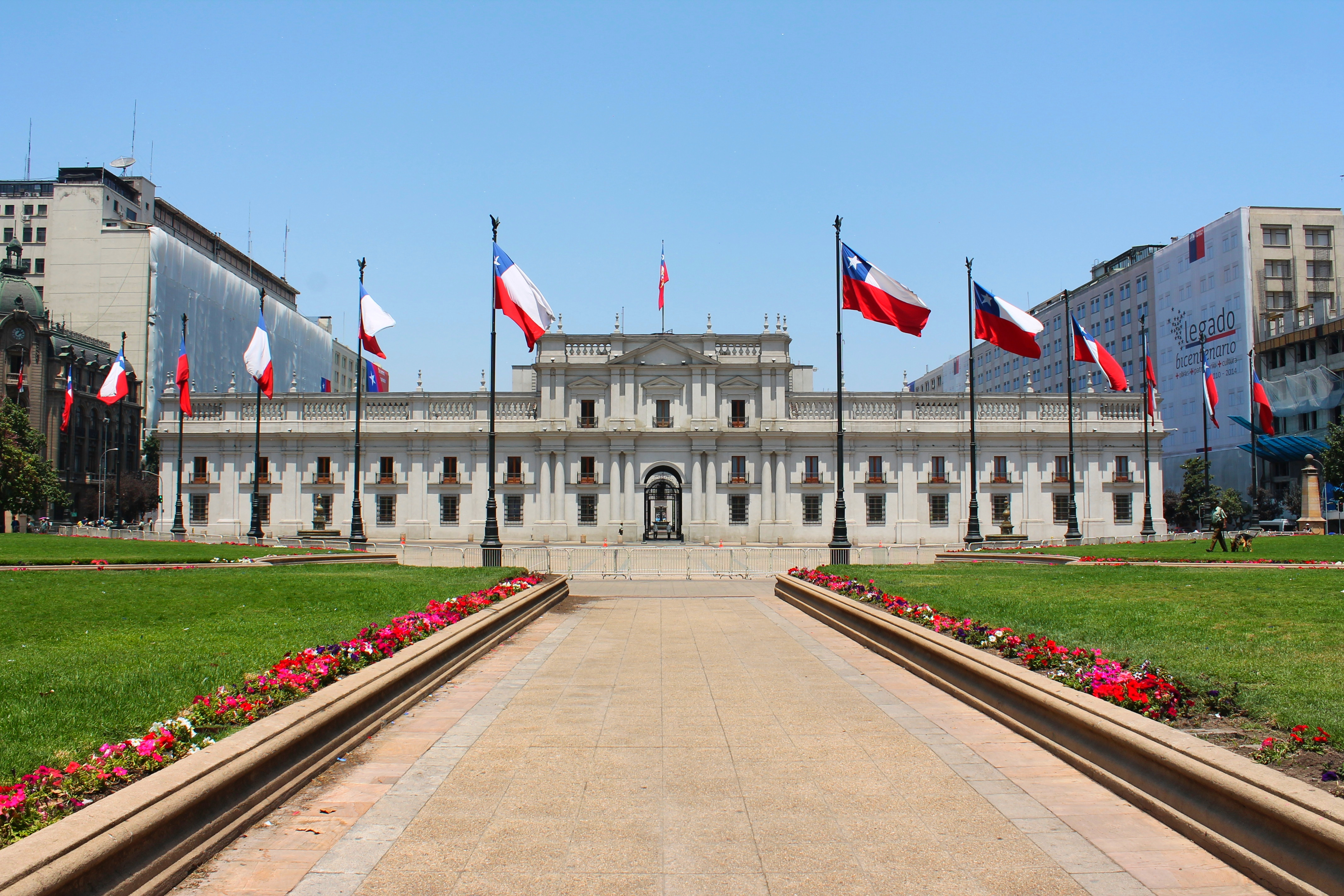
The Palacio de La Moneda, seat of government. The proposal retained Chile's historically presidentialist system.

Chapter VIII (Articles 279–306) preserved a presidential system headed by a directly elected president, with a runoff if no candidate won a majority in the first round, serving a four-year term with one permitted immediate re-election — a change from the single non-consecutive term allowed under the 1980 Constitution. It defined the role of cabinet ministers, the president's monopoly on the legitimate use of force, and the character of the police and armed forces as professional, hierarchical, and non-deliberative institutions grounded in respect for human rights and a gender perspective. The chapter also created three states of constitutional exception — assembly, siege, and catastrophe — and an oversight commission to monitor measures adopted under them.

=== Justice systems ===
Chapter IX (Articles 307–349) recognized the legal systems of Indigenous peoples and nations alongside a National Justice System comprising neighborhood, civil, criminal, family, labor, administrative, and environmental courts, courts of appeal, and the Supreme Court. It created a Council of Justice, an autonomous body responsible for judicial appointments, governance, training, and discipline, and required an intersectional and gender-sensitive approach across the justice system. The chapter also established the bases of the Election Certification Tribunal and regional electoral tribunals.

=== Autonomous constitutional bodies ===
Chapter X (Articles 350–382) regulated six autonomous constitutional bodies, each required to observe gender parity in its composition: the Comptroller General of the Republic, the Central Bank of Chile, the Public Prosecutor's Office, and the Public Criminal Defense Office, alongside a newly created National Data Protection Agency and a Constitutional Court replacing the existing Tribunal Constitucional.

=== Reform and replacement of the Constitution ===
Chapter XI (Articles 383–388) set out procedures for amending or replacing the Constitution. Reform bills could be initiated by the president, by members of Congress, or by popular initiative (with 10 percent of the electoral roll's signatures), and required approval by four-sevenths of both chambers; reforms touching the political system, the composition of Congress, the regional state model, fundamental rights, or the reform chapter itself required a two-thirds majority or else a plebiscite. Full replacement of the Constitution required a plebiscite establishing a new constituent assembly — which could itself be convened by popular initiative (25 percent of signatures), by the president with ratification by three-fifths of both chambers, or by a two-thirds joint vote of Congress — with the resulting text again subject to ratification by plebiscite.

=== Transitional provisions ===
Fifty-seven transitional provisions governed the installation of the new institutions. Existing laws would remain in force until repealed, amended, or declared unconstitutional by the new Constitutional Court. The sitting Chamber of Deputies and Senate would continue in their existing composition until 2026, when the new legislative chambers would take effect, and presidential re-election would not apply to the incumbent president, meaning Gabriel Boric would have completed his term in 2026 without the possibility of immediate re-election. The provisions also directed the executive, legislature, and public-service heads to issue the norms needed to implement the new Constitution, set deadlines for autonomy statutes for Rapa Nui and Juan Fernández, and required binding plebiscites to create two new autonomous regions — "Aconcagua," from the provinces of Petorca, San Felipe, and Los Andes in the Valparaíso Region, and "Chiloé," from the Chiloé Province in the Los Lagos Region.

== Reception and analysis ==
=== Gender equity and sexual diversity ===
The proposal was widely described as pioneering in its integration of gender equality and recognition of sexual and gender diversity, reflecting demands raised by feminist movements during the 2019 unrest. Commentators linked the Convention's own gender-balanced, LGBT-inclusive composition to the prominence these issues achieved in the final text. The parity requirements for state bodies and electoral lists were among the proposal's more innovative elements but drew comparatively little public criticism, in part because they had already been applied within the Convention itself. The text also recognized the right to terminate a pregnancy regardless of gender, thereby extending reproductive rights to transgender people, with implementing detail left to future legislation, and it explicitly addressed structural violence against LGBTQ+ people, which supporters said would have made it the first constitution in the world to offer such extensive protection to sexual and gender minorities.

=== Recognition of Indigenous nations ===
Article 5 recognized the pre-existence of Indigenous peoples and nations prior to the Chilean state, naming the Mapuche, Aymara, Rapanui, Lickanantay (Atacameño), Quechua, Colla, Diaguita, Chango, Kawésqar, Yagán, and Selk'nam, and committed the state to respect, promote, protect, and guarantee their self-determination. The election of Mapuche academic Elisa Loncón as the Convention's first president was widely reported as a symbolic milestone for Indigenous representation in a country where Indigenous peoples make up roughly 13 percent of the population but had never previously been recognized in its fundamental law.

=== Promotion of science and knowledge ===
Chilean researchers and commentators had long argued that science and technology were undervalued in national policy, citing declining public investment relative to the overall budget during the 2010s, limited public communication of research findings, and persistent job insecurity in the field. A dedicated Convention commission on knowledge systems, science, technology, culture, and heritage pushed to enshrine research as a state responsibility, and the final text framed education and research as fundamental rights, establishing lifelong education, freedom of research and teaching, universal access to digital connectivity, and state promotion of public and private research centers, while making research subject to bioethical oversight by a specialized institution. UNESCO and the journal Nature both noted the proposal's unusually explicit incorporation of science and knowledge as constitutional matters, though critics warned that new institutions would take time to become operational and that the associated fiscal costs — including for digital connectivity, education, and the new autonomous regions — could strain public finances.

=== Political system ===
Following the social unrest, a majority of Convention members initially favored moving toward a semi-presidential system with a prime minister as head of government, but the Convention ultimately voted to retain presidentialism. Analysts noted that, despite being described as an "attenuated" presidentialism, the proposed system in some respects expanded presidential authority relative to the 1980 Constitution — for instance, by letting the president appoint and remove the entire high command of the police rather than only the director general of the Carabineros — while also permitting, for the first time, immediate presidential re-election. An initial proposal for a unicameral Congress was likewise abandoned in favor of an asymmetric bicameral system in which the new Chamber of Regions was structurally weaker than the old Senate it replaced.

== Aftermath ==
The rejection of the proposal was a significant setback for President Boric, who reshuffled his cabinet less than six months into his term, replacing several younger, further-left ministers with more centrist figures. On 12 December 2022, fourteen political parties represented in Congress signed the "Agreement for Chile" (Acuerdo por Chile), launching a second, more institutionally controlled constitution-making process: a 24-member Expert Commission appointed by Congress drafted a preliminary text, which an elected Constitutional Council — dominated by right-wing parties following its May 2023 election — then revised. The resulting text, seen as more conservative than the 1980 Constitution it would have replaced, was submitted to a second mandatory referendum on 17 December 2023 and was likewise rejected, by roughly 56 percent to 44 percent. After two consecutive rejections in barely more than a year, Boric declared the constitutional process closed for the remainder of his term, and the amended 1980 Constitution has remained in force.

== See also ==
- Constitutional Convention (Chile)
- 2022 Chilean constitutional referendum
- 2023 Chilean constitutional referendum
- Chilean Constitution of 1980
