= Rodrigo Ruiz Encina =

Chilean politician

Rodrigo Ruiz

Personal details
- Born: 1 January 1967 (age 59)
- Party: Social Convergence (2018−2019)
- Other political affiliations: Autonomist Movement
- Spouse: Tania Madriaga
- Children: Two
- Parent: Eduardo Ruiz Contardo
- Relatives: Carlos Ruiz Encina
- Education: University of Chile (BA)
- Occupation: Politician
- Profession: Anthropologist

Rodrigo Ruiz Encina (born 1967) is a Chilean anthropologist.

Ruiz was a founding member and director of the e-newspaper El Desconcierto. Similarly, he is close to Jorge Sharp, mayor of Valparaíso.
