= Pelao Vade =

Chilean political activist

Rodrigo Rojas Vade
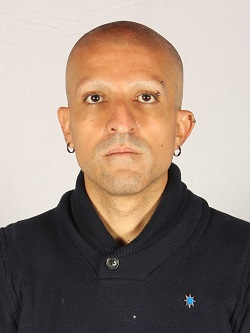
- Rojas Vade in 2021

Member of the Constitutional Convention
- In office 4 July 2021 – 16 March 2022
- Constituency: 13th District

Adjunct Vice President of the Constitutional Convention
- In office 29 July 2021 – 5 September 2021
- Preceded by: Creation of the office
- Succeeded by: Tania Madriaga

Personal details
- Born: Rodrigo Ernesto Rojas Vade; 10 October 1983 (age 42) Santiago, Chile
- Other political affiliations: The List of the People
- Occupation: Political activist
- Profession: Aeronautical prevention technician

Rodrigo Ernesto Rojas Vade (born 10 October 1983), widely known by his nickname Pelao Vade, is a Chilean former political activist who became one of the most recognizable faces of the 2019–2020 Chilean protests. In 2021, he was elected to the Chilean Constitutional Convention, the body tasked with drafting a new constitution for Chile. He later resigned in disgrace after it emerged that he had fabricated a cancer diagnosis—a lie that had underpinned both his public profile and his election campaign. He is openly gay.

During the protests, Rojas became a symbol of popular anger at Chile's private healthcare system, appearing shirtless on the front lines of street demonstrations with visible scars and medical catheters on his body, which he claimed were the result of leukaemia. The story proved to be a fabrication: in September 2021 the newspaper La Tercera revealed he had never had cancer, and he later admitted the underlying condition was syphilis. The scandal prompted his resignation from the Convention's executive board and, eventually, from the Convention itself. In February 2023, he was convicted of residual fraud against at least 30 victims who had donated money based on his false illness claims.

== Early life ==
Rojas was born and raised in Puente Alto, a working-class municipality on the southern outskirts of Santiago. His father worked for the Compañía de Teléfonos de Chile (CTC) and his mother was a homemaker. He attended the Colegio Polivalente San Damián before enrolling to study theatre at the Universidad Mayor, though he dropped out due to his family's financial difficulties.

He subsequently trained as an aeronautical prevention technician and was hired in 2009 by the Chilean airline LAN (now LATAM Airlines), where he worked as a flight operations officer. In 2017 he moved to the low-cost carrier JetSmart to work as a flight attendant.

== 2019 protests and public profile ==
When mass protests erupted across Chile in October 2019—sparked by a rise in Santiago's metro fares but quickly broadening into a sweeping rejection of inequality and the legacy of the Pinochet-era constitution—Rojas became one of the most visible figures on the front lines. He regularly appeared shirtless at Plaza Baquedano, the epicentre of the demonstrations in Santiago, displaying what appeared to be surgical scars and catheters across his torso. He claimed these were the consequence of a mixed lymphoblastic leukaemia he had been living with since 2012, and presented himself as living proof of the failures of Chile's profit-driven healthcare model.

His shaved head, a feature he attributed to chemotherapy, earned him the nickname Pelao Vade—roughly "Baldy Vade" in Spanish—among fellow protesters. The image of a cancer-stricken working man defying riot police resonated widely and made him a potent symbol of the movement's demands for a more just society.

== Constitutional Convention ==
=== Election ===
In late 2020, as Chile prepared for elections to a Constitutional Convention tasked with replacing the Pinochet-era constitution, Rojas was a founding member of The List of the People (La Lista del Pueblo), a grassroots far-left grouping that sought to channel the energy of the 2019 protests into the constitutional process. The coalition ultimately won around 17% of seats in the Convention.

Rojas stood as a candidate for District 13, a constituency covering several working-class communes in southern Santiago, including El Bosque, La Cisterna, Lo Espejo, Pedro Aguirre Cerda and San Miguel. He was elected in May 2021 with 19,312 votes. On 28 May, even before the Convention had convened, he was arrested by police while taking part in a protest at Parque Bustamante in Santiago.

=== Vice-presidency and committee work ===
At the inaugural session of the Convention on 4 July 2021, The List of the People put Rojas forward as a candidate for vice-president of the body; he failed to secure the post across three successive rounds of voting, obtaining 29, 45 and 35 votes respectively. When the Convention later expanded its executive board with seven additional vice-presidencies, Rojas secured one of those positions on 28 July 2021. He also served on the Commission on Indigenous Participation and Consultation.

On 28 June 2021, Rojas was one of the founders of the "Red Disidente Constituyente" (Dissident Constituent Network), a grouping within the Convention dedicated to advancing the visibility and rights of LGBT and sexually diverse Chileans in the new constitutional text. Its other members included Jeniffer Mella, Bessy Gallardo, Valentina Miranda, Javier Fuchslocher, Pedro Muñoz Leiva, Gaspar Domínguez and Tomás Laibe.

His alleged cancer condition had attracted sympathy from across the political spectrum during the campaign period, including from right-wing constituent Carol Bown of the UDI—a party ideologically worlds apart from Rojas—with whom he participated in televised dialogues organized by the broadcaster Chilevisión.

On 1 September 2021, Rojas and 16 other convention members broke away from The List of the People to form a new grouping called "Pueblo Constituyente," which would coordinate their work independently within the Convention.

== Cancer scandal and resignation ==
=== Exposure and confession ===
On 4 September 2021, the Sunday edition of La Tercera published an investigative report revealing that Rojas Vade had never had cancer. Confronted with the findings, Rojas admitted the diagnosis was false. He stated that years earlier he had been diagnosed with a condition he described as carrying a "great stigma," and that rather than disclose it he had told his family, friends and eventually the public that he had cancer. He expressed that he felt he had "nothing more to do" at the Convention and indicated he was considering stepping down.

On 15 September 2021, Rojas Vade's lawyer confirmed in an interview with El Mercurio that the real diagnoses were syphilis, idiopathic thrombocytopenic purpura and Behçet's disease. In a later television interview in March 2022, Rojas stated plainly that he had preferred to claim leukaemia rather than admit he had syphilis.

The scandal attracted extensive international coverage. The Convention's own executive board, led by president Elisa Loncón and vice-president Jaime Bassa, filed a formal complaint with the Investigations Police of Chile (PDI).

=== Departure from the Convention ===
On 5 September 2021, Rojas resigned as Adjunct Vice President, a resignation formally accepted by the executive board. He was replaced the following day by Tania Madriaga, who had been his running partner in the original vice-presidential candidacy—the Convention's rules required such candidacies to be put forward in gender-balanced pairs.

On 8 September, the "Pueblo Constituyente" grouping expelled him from its ranks.

On 20 September, Rojas announced he was resigning from the Convention and would not attend any further sessions or votes. However, at the time the Chilean constitution contained no mechanism allowing constituent members to resign—departures were only permitted on certified medical grounds as determined by the Election Certification Tribunal (Tricel). As a result, despite his announced withdrawal, Rojas continued to draw his full salary of 50 monthly tax units (UTM) throughout the period.

The legal deadlock was resolved on 11 March 2022, when a constitutional reform passed by Congress—specifically designed to address situations such as his—was published in the Diario Oficial. The reform allowed constituent members to resign when serious circumstances severely impaired their ability to serve or threatened the functioning of the Convention, subject to Tricel approval. Rojas formalized his resignation the same day, and on 15 March the Tricel formally accepted it, bringing his membership of the Convention to a definitive end.

=== Criminal conviction ===
On 2 December 2022, the Public Prosecutor's Office announced it would formally charge Rojas Vade with fraud. The prosecution alleged that he had solicited and received donations from members of the public to fund treatment for a cancer he did not have, and that he had leveraged the false diagnosis to win votes in the constitutional election. He faced a potential sentence of between 61 and 541 days in prison.

On 13 February 2023, Rojas appeared before the Seventh Guarantee Court of Santiago, where he accepted a simplified procedure and acknowledged the charges against him. He was convicted of residual fraud—a form of petty fraud under Chilean law—and sentenced to 61 days of imprisonment, an accessory penalty of suspension from public office for the duration of the sentence, and a fine of 11 UTM. The court found that he had defrauded at least 30 victims of a combined total of 13,366,646 Chilean pesos by constructing an elaborate pretense of illness to induce them to donate. Having met the applicable legal conditions, his custodial sentence was commuted to one year of conditional probation. (Note: The full sentence, issued in cause RIT: O-13437-2021 RUC: 2100807673-9, found Rojas Vade guilty as the perpetrator of the offence of residual fraud under Article 473 of the Chilean Penal Code, in its completed degree, committed between May and June 2020 in the commune of Santiago. The court found that he had used a series of artifices to construct a genuine theatrical staging that led victims to believe he was suffering from cancer.)

== Incident at Route 78 (2026) ==
In the early hours of 12 March 2026, Rojas Vade was found unconscious by the side of Route 78, in the commune of Melipilla. He had sustained multiple contusions to the head, his hands and feet had been bound, and he had been doused with thinner. (Note: Initial reports attributed the liquid to gasoline, but chemical analysis later confirmed that it was thinner and other paint-related liquids found in his own home.) On his right forearm the phrase "VIVA KAST" was written in large black letters, and on his left, "NO + ZURDOS" ("No More Leftists"). During a subsequent search of his home, PDI detectives found plastic zip ties inside a backpack — the same type as those used to bind him when he was discovered on the highway. Sources linked to the investigation also indicated that his critical condition had not been caused by the blows he received, but rather by a heroin overdose. The case was initially classified as kidnapping with injuries, but the PDI later concluded that no third parties were involved and that it was likely a self-staged attack. The incident was quickly used by some left-wing politicians to blame the "far right" for the attack without presenting any evidence, later having to retract their statements as investigations pointed to a false flag.
