= Carmen Gloria Valladares =

Chilean judge (born 1954)

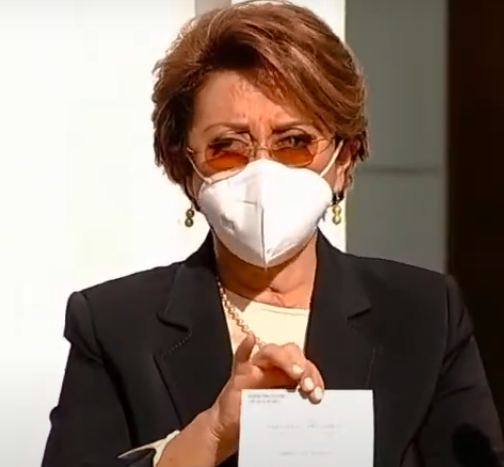

Accessory President of the Constitutional Convention
- In office 4 July 2021 – 4 July 2021
- Preceded by: Creation of the position
- Succeeded by: Elisa Loncón

Reporting Secretary of the Election Qualifying Court
- Incumbent
- Assumed office 1999

Personal details
- Born: 1 January 1954 (age 72) Antofagasta, Chile
- Education: Pontifical Catholic University of Chile (BA)
- Occupation: Judge
- Profession: Lawyer

Carmen Gloria Valladares Moyano (born 1954) is a Chilean judge.

Valladares is a member of the Association of Magistrates of the Americas with experience in electoral justice affairs. She is a member of the international electoral observation missions in many Latin American countries.

== Biography ==
=== Family ===
She is the only daughter of Justo Valladares Orellana and Lily Moyano Álvarez, both teachers. On her maternal side, she is the great-niece of Gabriela Mistral.

=== Studies ===
She studied at the British School and graduated from the San José de Antofagasta English School in 1972. Later, she entered the Pontificia Universidad Católica de Chile, where she studied law with professors such as Hernán Larraín and Arturo Aylwin. After finishing her Bachelor of Arts, she did a postgraduate diploma in constitutional law.

=== Career ===
In 1984, she entered the Judiciary as secretary to Minister Israel Bórquez. Three years later, she joined the Elections Qualifying Tribunal of Chile (Tricel) to participate in the preparations for the 1988 national plebiscite.

In 1999, she became the reporting secretary of the institution. After a brief period in which she held the same function in the Constitutional Court of Chile, she returned to Tricel in 2012.

In 2021, President Sebastián Piñera assigned her the task of leading the installation ceremony of the Constitutional Convention on 4 July. Valladares remained as its accessory president until the assumption of the first elected president, Elisa Loncón.
