= Rodrigo Rojas =

Rodrigo Rojas may refer to:

- Rodrigo Rojas de Negri (1967–1986), Chilean photographer who was tortured during demonstrations against Pinochet
- Rodrigo Rojas Vade (born 1983), Chilean political activist
- Rodrigo Rojas (footballer) (born 1988), Paraguayan footballer
- Rodrigo Rojas (karateka) (born 1990), Chilean karateka
