= Constanza Schönhaut =

Chilean lawyer and politician (born 1989)

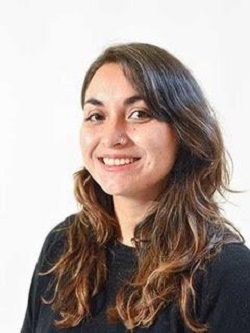

Member of the Chamber of Deputies
- Incumbent
- Assumed office 11 March 2026
- Constituency: 11th District

Member of the Constitutional Convention
- In office 4 July 2021 – 4 July 2022
- Constituency: 11th District

Personal details
- Born: 31 January 1989 (age 37) Santiago, Chile
- Party: Social Convergence (2018−)
- Other political affiliations: Izquierda Autónoma (2011−2016); Autonomist Movement (2016−2018)
- Education: University of Chile (LL.B)
- Occupation: Constituent
- Profession: Lawyer

Constanza Gabriela Schönhaut Soto (born 31 January 1989) is a Chilean lawyer and politician.

A member of the Frente Amplio, she was elected as a member of the Constitutional Convention in 2021, representing the 11th District of the Metropolitan Region of Santiago.

== Biography ==
She was born on 31 January 1989 in Santiago, Chile. She is the daughter of Natalio David Schönhaut Berman and Pamela Alejandra Soto Torres.

Schönhaut completed her primary and secondary education at Colegio San Francisco del Alba in the commune of Las Condes, graduating in 2006.

She pursued higher education at the University of Chile, where she completed a bachelor’s program and later studied law, earning a law degree and qualifying as an attorney.

== Political career ==
Schönhaut was a member of the Social Convergence party.

She is affiliated with the Association of Feminist Lawyers and the Regional Center for Human Rights and Gender Justice, as well as the Corporación Humanas. Between 2018 and 2019, she served as coordinator of the Women to Power (Mujeres al Poder) project.

In the 2017 presidential elections, as a founding member of the Frente Amplio (FA) and Secretary General of the then Autonomist Movement, Schönhaut participated in the campaign team of FA candidate Beatriz Sánchez.

In the elections held on 15–16 May 2021, Schönhaut ran as a candidate for the Constitutional Convention representing the 11th District of the Metropolitan Region as a member of the Convergence Social Party, within the Apruebo Dignidad electoral pact.

She obtained 21,536 votes, corresponding to 5.60% of the valid votes cast, and was elected as a member of the Convention.

After Chileans rejected the proposed constitution in a plebiscite, in October 2022, she assumed the position of political adviser with a focus on regional coordination in the cabinet of the Minister of the Interior, Carolina Tohá.

In 2025, she was elected as a member of the Chamber of Deputies.
