= Mariana Aylwin =

Chilean politician (born 1949)

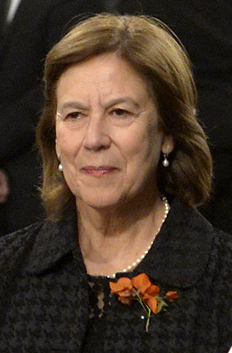

Regional Counsellor of the Metropolitan Region of Santiago
- In office 11 March 2014 – 16 November 2016
- Preceded by: Office created
- Succeeded by: Jacqueline Saintard

Member of the Chamber of Deputies
- In office 11 March 1994 – 11 March 1998
- Preceded by: Gustavo Alessandri
- Succeeded by: Lily Pérez
- Constituency: 26th District

Personal details
- Born: 13 July 1949 (age 77) Santiago, Chile
- Party: Christian Democratic (1987–2018); Close to centre-right (2018–2022); Amarillos por Chile (2022-2025)
- Spouse: Carlos Bascuñán (1972–present)
- Children: Four: Carlos, Paz, María Laura and Ana Luisa
- Parent(s): Patricio Aylwin; Leonor Oyarzún
- Relatives: Andrés Aylwin (uncle), Francisco Aylwin (brother)
- Education: Pontifical Catholic University of Chile
- Occupation: Politician
- Profession: Pedagogy in History

Laura Mariana Aylwin Oyarzún (born 13 July 1949) is a Chilean teacher, historian and politician. She was born into the Aylwin family; her father, Patricio Aylwin, was the 30th president of Chile from 1990 to 1994, years where he led the beginnings of the Transition to democracy from Augusto Pinochet dictatorship.

During her father's presidency, she worked as an external advisor to the Ministry General Secretariat of the Presidency Directorate of Studies.

== Biography ==
Since 1972, Aylwin has been married to the historian Carlos Bascuñán, with whom she had four children, including the actress Paz Bascuñán. She completed his secondary studies at the Santa Úrsula College in the capital city Santiago de Chile. Once received, she studied pedagogy in History, Geography and Civic Education at the Pontifical Catholic University of Chile (PUC), graduating in 1976. Later, she obtained a scholarship from the Ibero-American Institute of Cooperation in Madrid.

In 1987, in the late of Augusto Pinochet's regime, she joined to his father's party: the Christian Democracy, organization which reached the proclaiming of Patricio Aylwin as presidencial candidate for the 1989 Chilean presidential election that he won with support from the Socialist Party (PS), the Party for Democracy (PPD), the Radical Party (PR), Humanist Party and other minor faction from these parties; all of them formed part from the centre-left coalition Concertación de Partidos por la Democracia which governed Chile during 20 years (1990–2010).

In 1993, Aylwin was elected as deputy for the 26th District of La Florida. During her spell in the Chamber under the government of the also christian democratic Eduardo Frei Ruiz-Tagle (1994–2000), she was a member of the Permanent Commission on Education, Culture, Sports and Recreation, Family and Health.

On 11 March 2000, she was appointed as Minister of Education by the centre-leftist President Ricardo Lagos (PPD), where Aylwin remained in the charge during the first three years of that presidency (2000–2006). During his management was implemented the controversial Credit with State guarantee (CAE; "Crédito con Aval del Estado"). Nevertheless, as other little achievements there were the approval of the Constitutional Reform that establishes twelve years of compulsory and free schooling or the law which establishes teacher evaluation.

=== After the Christian Democracy ===
On 5 January 2018, she announced her resignation from Christian Democracy alongside other militants members from the centre-right faction "Progresismo con Progreso". Days later, she led the announcing of a new political moviment called "EnMarcha", which was based in Emmanuel Macron's campaign during 2017 French presidential election.

On 28 December 2020, it was reported by La Tercera newspaper that Aylwin was part of Sebastián Sichel's campaign team for 2021 Chilean presidential primaries alongside Juan José Santa Cruz: with whom―alongside Sichel―founded El Dínamo newspaper on 14 November 2010. Then, on 28 January 2021, she rermarked her support to Sichel.

In 2022, she joined Amarillos por Chile.
