= Ñusta Huillac =

Chilean rebel

Ñusta Huillac (d. 1780 CE) was a Qulla leader who rebelled against the Spanish in the Atacama Desert (present-day Tarapacá Region, Chile) in the 1780s. She was nicknamed La Tirana (Spanish for "the Tyrant") because of her alleged mistreatment of prisoners. The term ñusta comes from the Quechuan languages and (also spelled ñust'a) was a name for princesses in the Inca Empire.

According to legend, she fell in love with Vasco de Almeida, one of her prisoners, and pleaded with her people for him. After her father's death, she became the leader of a group of former Incas who were brought to Chile to mine the silver of Huantajaya. Numerous tribes pledged their alliance to her and she became a symbol of resistance against the Spanish rule.
