= El Dínamo =

- Verdades que mueven
- Type: Digital newspaper
- Format: Online
- Owner: Giro País SpA
- Founder(s): Juan José Santa Cruz; Sebastián Sichel; Mariana Aylwin
- Editor-in-chief: Hugo Infante
- Founded: 14 November 2010; 15 years ago
- Political alignment: Centre/Centre-right; Pluralism; Liberalism; Christian democracy
- Language: Spanish
- Headquarters: Av General del Canto #223, Office 801; Providencia, Santiago, Chile
- Website: www.eldinamo.cl

El Dínamo is a Chilean online newspaper founded in 2010.

In late 2009, Sebastián Sichel ―then Sebastián Iglesias― presented the communicational project that would end up being El Dínamo. Later, the newspaper was supported by then Christian democratic Juan José Santa Cruz, leader of the think tank Giro País.

== History ==
After the defeat of the Christian-democratic candidate Eduardo Frei Ruíz-Tagle against Sebastián Piñera (centre-right) in 2009 Chilean presidential election, Giro País decided, through its then executive director Sebastián Iglesias, to create a medium that promotes a "culture of the opposition in the current Concertación", because Giro País would be "a center of action more than of thought and we want it to put centre and liberal ideas capable of bringing to the new opposition the modernity, which was left behind in time". Thus, Ediciones Giro País SpA was officially created and was initially established by Mariana Aylwin, the lawyer Luis Alberto Aninat Urrejola and Juan José Santa Cruz, who later became the financier and campaign manager of Andrés Velasco, former Minister of Finance of Michelle Bachelet first government (2006–2010).
