= Qullamarka =

Wipala

Chakana.

Qullamarka is a coordinating platform for Kolla organizations based in the province of Salta in Northern Argentina. It comprises community organizations and includes OCAN (Organizations Aboriginal Communities Nazarene), UCAV (Union of Indigenous Communities Victoreñas), CIKDI (Kolla Indigenous Council of Iruya), CIPKT (Kolla Pueblo Indian Community Tinkunaku), and CIACRL (Indigenous Community of Upper River Basin Lipeo). In total, Qullamarka represents 80 communities spread over a territory of more than 1 million hectares in the province of Salta.

Qullamarka uses the emblem wipala and the Inca Cross - Chakana - as its symbols.
