= Andrés Aylwin =

Chilean lawyer, activist and politician

Andrés Aylwin Azócar
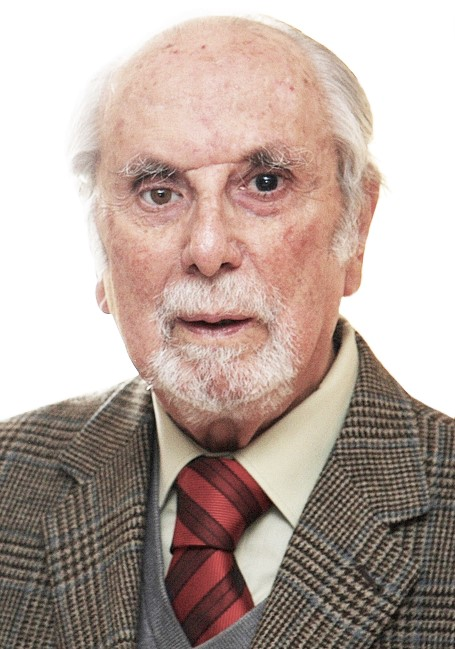

Member of the Chamber of Deputies of Chile
- In office 1965–1973

Member of the Chamber of Deputies of Chile
- In office 1990–1998

Personal details
- Born: June 20, 1925 Viña del Mar, Chile
- Died: August 20, 2018 (aged 93) Santiago, Chile
- Party: Christian Democratic Party (Chile)
- Spouse: Mónica Chiorrini Givovich
- Children: 4
- Relatives: Patricio Aylwin (brother)
- Occupation: Lawyer, politician, human rights activist

Andrés Aylwin Azócar (20 June 1925 – 20 August 2018) was a Chilean lawyer, activist and politician who served as a Deputy representing the Christian Democratic Party from 1965 to 1973 and from 1990 to 1998. His older brother was Patricio Aylwin.

During the military dictatorship (1973–1990), Aylwin defended many of the victims arrested by the government of Augusto Pinochet.

== Early life and education ==
Aylwin was born on 20 June 1925 in Viña del Mar to Miguel Aylwin Gajardo, a lawyer and judge who served as President of the Supreme Court of Chile in 1957, and Laura Azócar Álvarez. He was the brother of former President Patricio Aylwin, former Comptroller General Arturo Aylwin Azócar, and the uncle of former deputy and Minister of Education Mariana Aylwin.

Aylwin completed his primary and secondary education at the Liceo de San Bernardo. He studied law at the University of Chile, where he completed his studies in 1953 and earned a degree in legal sciences with a thesis titled A Critical Study of Chilean Labour Procedure (Estudio crítico de nuestro procedimiento del trabajo).

== Career ==
Aylwin was admitted to the bar on 19 June 1953. Following his qualification as a lawyer, he worked at the Legal Aid Office of the San Bernardo Bar Association between 1953 and 1957, eventually becoming its head. From 1956 to 1964, he served in the Santiago Legal Assistance Service, and between 1963 and 1965, he worked as a lawyer at the State Defence Council. He also taught forensic practice as an assistant professor at the University of Chile Faculty of Law and at the San Bernardo Night School.

Aylwin collaborated as a contributor to the newspaper La Época in 1990. He wrote a few books, including Simply what i saw (Simplemente lo que vi: 1973-1990 y los imperativos que surgen del dolor) and Eight days of a relegated (Ocho días de un relegado).

== Political career ==
Aylwin began his political involvement during his university years, joining the National Falange in 1949. He was a candidate for the presidency of the University of Chile Student Federation (FECh) and served on the executive council of the Federation of Chilean Students between 1948 and 1949, acting as a student representative before the University Council.

He joined the Christian Democratic Party of Chile at its founding in 1957. During the 1960s, he was elected president of the party at the municipal level in San Bernardo and later in Providencia.

Aylwin was elected to the Chamber of Deputies in 1965, representing the Eighth Departmental Grouping (Melipilla, San Antonio, San Bernardo, and Maipo). He was re-elected for the periods 1969–1973 and 1973–1977, the latter term being left incomplete due to the military coup of 11 September 1973.

During these terms, he served on several permanent committees, including Constitution, Legislation and Justice; Agriculture and Colonization; Labour and Social Security; and Government Affairs. He also participated in special investigative commissions, including those examining violence against peasants and officials of the Agrarian Reform Corporation (CORA) and the Agricultural Development Institute (INDAP).

=== Opposition to the military dictatorship and human rights work ===
Aylwin was a member of the so-called Group of Thirteen, composed of Christian Democrats who publicly opposed the 1973 military coup, signing a declaration dissenting from the official position of the party leadership.

Between January and March 1978, he was relegated by the regime to Guallatire, in the present-day Arica and Parinacota Region, which temporarily removed him from political activity. After regaining his freedom, he played a prominent role as a lawyer defending political prisoners and victims of human rights violations.

He participated in the Committee of Cooperation for Peace in Chile and later worked at the Vicariate of Solidarity, providing legal assistance in cases involving detained and disappeared persons. In 1978, he was elected president of the Association of Lawyers for Human Rights and served as a director of the Commission Against Torture, acting as a prosecuting lawyer in cases of enforced disappearance.

=== Parliamentary service after the return to democracy ===
Following the restoration of democracy, Aylwin was elected deputy for District No. 30 in the Santiago Metropolitan Region in 1989 and re-elected in 1993, serving from 1990 to 1998. During this period, he was a member of the Permanent Committees on Constitution, Legislation and Justice and on Human Rights, Nationality and Citizenship, serving as president of the former committee.

== Personal life ==
He was married to Mónica Chiorrini Givovich for 68 years, and they had four children: Cecilia, Andrés, Pedro, and Verónica.

In 1988, he was involved in a car accident, as a result of which he lost his right eye.

== Death ==
Andrés Aylwin died on 20 August 2018 in Santiago.

== Awards and recognition ==
Throughout his career, Aylwin received numerous awards for his sustained commitment to the defence of human rights. In 1991, he was awarded the Hugo Tapia Arqueros Prize by the Chilean Bar Association, as well as distinctions from the Latin American Association of Human Rights, the Service of Peace and Justice (SERPAJ), and the Human Rights Commission of the Sixth Region, including the Raúl Silva Henríquez Award.

In 1992, with the support of the Chamber of Deputies and human rights organisations, he was nominated for the Nobel Peace Prize. That same year, he received the "Voz Ciudadana 91" award as the most outstanding political figure of 1991.
