= Camila Nieto =

Chilean politician

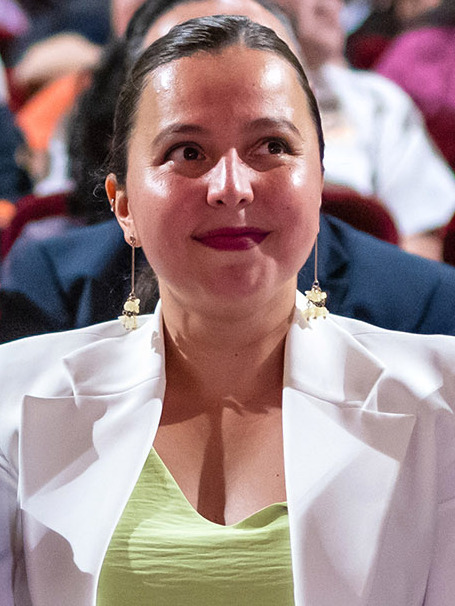
- Nieto in 2024

Mayor of Valparaíso
- Incumbent
- Assumed office 6 December 2024
- Preceded by: Jorge Sharp

Councilwoman of Valparaíso
- In office 28 July 2021 – 6 December 2024

Personal details
- Born: 23 January 1991 (age 35) Valparaíso, Chile
- Party: Frente Amplio
- Education: Pontifical Catholic University of Valparaíso (LL.B)
- Occupation: Politician
- Profession: Lawyer

Camila Tatiana Nieto Hernández (born 23 January 1991) is a Chilean politician.

She is the mayor of Valparaíso.

== Biography ==
Since childhood, Camila Nieto lived on Las Cañas Hill in Valparaíso. She studied at the Juana Ross de Edwards High School, where she became president of her student body. Later, she studied at the Pontifical Catholic University of Valparaíso (PUCV) School of Law, where she earned a law degree.

During her time at the university, Nieto also served as head of the Culture Department of her program's Student Center, and later as its vice president. She also founded and joined the Aurora Study Center and directed the PUCV Trade Union School; both initiatives were sponsored by the PUCV Law School.

== Career ==
In the 2021 municipal elections, Nieto ran as a candidate for the Convergencia Social party, part of the Frente Amplio coalition. She obtained 6,081 votes and was elected councilor of Valparaíso with more than 5% of the votes.

In the 2024 municipal elections, Nieto ran as a candidate for mayor of Valparaíso. After winning her coalition's primary election with 38% of the vote, she was elected mayor in the Valparaíso municipal elections, with 28.1% of the vote.
