= Isabel Godoy =

Chilean Qulla activist and politician (born 1967)

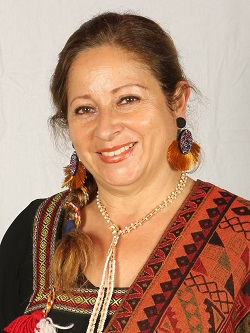

Member of the Constitutional Convention
- In office 4 July 2021 – 4 July 2022
- Preceded by: office established

Personal details
- Born: Isabel Selena Godoy Monárdez; 1967 (age 58–59)
- Occupation: Accountant

Isabel Selena Godoy Monárdez (born 1967) is a Qulla activist and politician in Chile. A former political prisoner during the Chilean military dictatorship, Godoy was elected in 2021 to represent the Qulla people at the Constitutional Convention.

Godoy is considered an ally of 2021 Chilean presidential candidate Daniel Jadue of the Communist Party.

== Biography ==
Godoy was born in 1967 to a Qulla family. At the age of 17, Godoy was assaulted by a police officer while protesting the Augusto Pinochet dictatorship and was put in prison for her social activism. Godoy is an accountant by profession and is currently studying to receive a degree in social work.

Godoy has served as a member of the National Council of the Qulla People. Additionally, Godoy has served as president of the Kolla Flora indigenous community.

== Constitutional Convention ==
In the 2021 Constitutional Convention election, Godoy ran to represent a reserved seat for the Qulla people in the Atacama Region. She was elected after receiving 631 votes (29.53%) out of 2,137 votes cast. During her campaign, Godoy indicated she supported the establishment of a plurinational state in Chile inclusive of indigenous nations, and stated that the new constitution should safeguard the legal right to water.

Following her election to the body, Godoy chose to run for President of the Constitutional Convention. In the first round of the election, Godoy received 35 votes, but in the second round lost to Mapuche activist Elisa Loncón, who won with 96 votes in her favor. Godoy has stated that she believes Mapuche leaders consider members of other native nations such as the Qulla, who are smaller in population, as "little brothers" whose autonomy isn't respected.

Godoy is a staunch critic of conservative President of Chile Sebastián Piñera and has called for his resignation, arguing that he has hindered the work of the Constitutional Convention to the point where "we have no choice but to request the resignation of the President".

== Political views ==
Godoy has praised the plurinational model of Bolivia and has called for a similar system to be implemented in Chile to safeguard the rights of indigenous peoples. Godoy has called for an end to what she considers the "militarization" of indigenous areas in Chile.
