= María Elisa Quinteros =

President of the Chilean Constitutional Convention (born 1981)

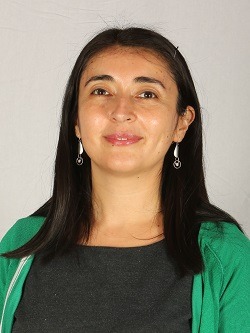
- Official portrait, 2021

President of the Constitutional Convention
- In office 5 January 2022 – 4 July 2022
- Preceded by: Elisa Loncón
- Succeeded by: office abolished

Member of the Constitutional Convention
- In office 4 July 2021 – 4 July 2022
- Constituency: 17th District

Personal details
- Born: 21 December 1981 (age 44) Talca, Chile
- Party: Independent
- Education: University of Talca (BA); University of Chile (PhD)
- Occupation: Constituent
- Profession: Odontologist

María Elisa Quinteros Cáceres (born 20 December 1981) is a Chilean dentist, public health academic, and independent politician.

She served as a member of the Constitutional Convention from 2021 to 2022, representing the 17th District of the Maule Region, and was elected President of the Convention on 5 January 2022.

== Early life and education ==
Quinteros was born on 20 December 1981 in Talca, Chile. Her parents are Ariel Quinteros and Patricia Cáceres. She is single.

She completed her primary and secondary education at Colegio María Mazarello and Liceo Abate Molina in Talca. She later studied dentistry at the University of Talca. Quinteros subsequently earned a master's degree and a doctorate in public health from the University of Chile.

== Professional career ==
Quinteros worked for eight years at the Department of Health of Hualañé, where she served as president of the public employees’ association. She currently works as a researcher and academic at the Department of Public Health of the University of Talca.

She is a member of the board of the Chilean Society of Epidemiology and serves on the executive committee of the Latin American Chapter of the International Society for Environmental Epidemiology. She is also affiliated with Fundación Afluentes and the Maule Environmental Network.

== Political career ==
Quinteros is an independent politician. In the elections held on 15–16 May 2021, she ran as an independent candidate for the Constitutional Convention representing the 17th District of the Maule Region, as part of the Asamblea Popular por la Dignidad list. She was elected with 12,507 votes, corresponding to 5.49% of the valid votes cast.

On 5 January 2022, during a plenary session of the Convention, she was elected President of the Constitutional Convention as a consensus candidate supported by several social movements and constituent groups, including Movimientos Sociales Constituyentes, the Plurinational and Popular Constituent Coordination, Pueblo Constituyente, and representatives of the Indigenous Reserved Seats.
