= Arturo Aylwin =

Chilean lawyer and academic (1927–2024)

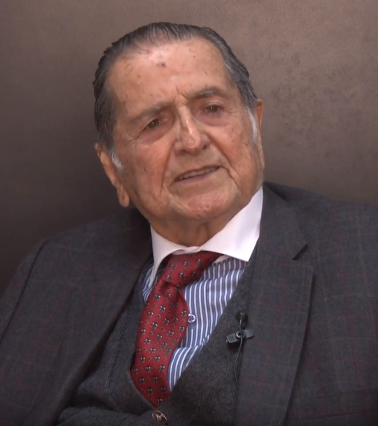

Comptroller General of Chile
- In office 2 April 1997 – 12 February 2002
- President: Eduardo Frei Ruiz-Tagle (1997−2000); Ricardo Lagos (2000−2002)
- Preceded by: Osvaldo Iturriaga Ruiz
- Succeeded by: Gustavo Sciolla Avendaño

Personal details
- Born: 12 August 1927 Valdivia, Chile
- Died: 13 February 2024 (aged 96) Santiago, Chile
- Education: University of Chile
- Profession: Lawyer

Arturo Aylwin Azócar (12 August 1927 – 13 February 2024) was a Chilean lawyer and academic. He specialized in administrative law and served as Comptroller General of Chile between 1997 and 2002.

== Early life and education ==
Arturo Aylwin Azócar was born on 12 August 1927 to Miguel Aylwin, lawyer and judge who became president of the Supreme Court, and Laura Azócar Álvarez. He was partly of Welsh and Basque origin. His family is made up of important figures in Chilean politics and law, including his brothers Patricio (president, 1990–1994) and Andrés (deputy). Aylwin studied at the Faculty of Law at the University of Chile, and qualified as a lawyer on 13 July 1953. The following year he began working as a public defender in San Bernardo.

== Professional career ==
In 1957, Aylwin joined the office of Comptroller General, where he served in the Legal Division, and later in the Committees on Land and Colonization, Armed Forces, Financial Administration and General Issues. In 1967, he was appointed prosecutor, a position he held until 1995, when he became deputy comptroller general. In April 1997, Aylwin was appointed Comptroller General by President Eduardo Frei Ruiz-Tagle, a position he held until August 2002. Since that date, he was an external technical advisor on municipal and regional matters to the Legislative Commissions of the Senate and the Chamber of Deputies.

In 1992, Aylwin was invited to the celebration of Kim Il-sung's 80th birth anniversary in North Korea.

== Death ==
Arturo Aylwin died in Santiago on 13 February 2024, at the age of 96.
