= Jaime Bassa =

Chilean politician and attorney

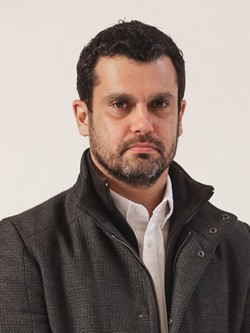

Member of the Chamber of Deputies
- Incumbent
- Assumed office 11 March 2026

Vice President of the Constitutional Convention
- In office 4 July 2021 – 4 January 2022
- President: Elisa Loncón
- Preceded by: Office established
- Succeeded by: Gaspar Domínguez

Member of the Constitutional Convention
- In office 4 July 2021 – 4 July 2022
- Constituency: 7th District

Personal details
- Born: Jaime Andrés Bassa Mercado; 31 March 1977 (age 49) Santiago, Chile
- Party: Broad Front
- Education: Pontifical Catholic University of Chile
- Occupation: Law professor

Jaime Andrés Bassa Mercado (born 31 March 1977) is a Chilean attorney and politician serving as deputy since 11 March 2026. Bassa has served as the Vice President of the Constitutional Convention of Chile from 2021 to 2022. He is a member of the left-wing political party Broad Front.

== Early life and education ==
Bassa received his law degree from the Pontifical Catholic University of Chile. He later received master's degrees in law from the University of Chile and in philosophy from the University of Valparaíso. Additionally, Bassa received a doctorate in law from the University of Barcelona. As an academic, Bassa has notably served as a professor of constitutional law at the University of Valparaíso.

Bassa was heavily involved in student politics during his youth, and was generally associated with moderate and liberal politics. During his time in university, Bassa ran for a student position on the same list as Sebastián Sichel.

== Political views ==
During his early political career, Bassa held centrist or centre-left views. During the 2010s, his political views shifted leftward, and he embraced economic interventionist policies. Bassa has criticized economic inequality in Chile, stating that "[i]t is important to note that the wealth of this country is generated by all of us and it is not fair that it is concentrated in a few families".

Bassa is a close ally of leftist politician Gabriel Boric, and has endorsed Boric's campaign in the 2021 Chilean general election.
