= Juan José Santa Cruz =

Chilean lawyer

Personal details
- Born: 26 April 1959 (age 67) Santiago, Chile
- Party: Christian Democratic (−2015); Citizens (2015–2018); Independent close to centre-right (2018–)
- Spouse: Catalina
- Parent(s): Andrés Santa Cruz Serrano; Mercedes López Latorre
- Relatives: Andrés Santa Cruz López (brother)
- Education: Pontifical Catholic University of Chile
- Occupation: Politician
- Profession: Lawyer

Juan José Santa Cruz López (born 26 April 1959) is a Chilean lawyer, businessman and politician.

In 2010, he was a founding member of El Dínamo newspaper alongside Sebastián Sichel (then Sebastián Iglesias).

== Biography ==
He was born within the marriage between Andrés Santa Cruz Serrano and Mercedes López Latorre, granddaughter of Admiral Juan José Latorre, Chilean hero during the War of the Pacific (1879–1884). Despite his family was of christian-democratic tendencies, his brother Andrés was a collaborator of Augusto Pinochet dictatorship (1973–1990). Nevertheless, Juan José opposed the military regime voting against the 1980 Constitution of Chile.

On 5 April 2018, he refused being President of Televisión Nacional de Chile (TVN) board. Then, on 14 June, he broke up with Citizens —his party— after differences with Andrés Velasco.

Since December 2020, it made massively known his work by Sebastián Sichel campaign.
