= Constitutional Convention (Chile) =

Chilean constituent assembly (2021–2022)

Constitutional Convention Convención Constitucional

Type
- Type: Unicameral constituent assembly

History
- Founded: July 4, 2021
- Disbanded: July 4, 2022

Leadership
- President: Elisa Loncón (July 2021–January 2022); María Elisa Quinteros (January–July 2022) since 15–16 May 2021
- Vice-President: Jaime Bassa (July 2021–January 2022); Gaspar Domínguez (January–July 2022)

Structure
- Seats: 155 conventional constituents Two-thirds for control (104)
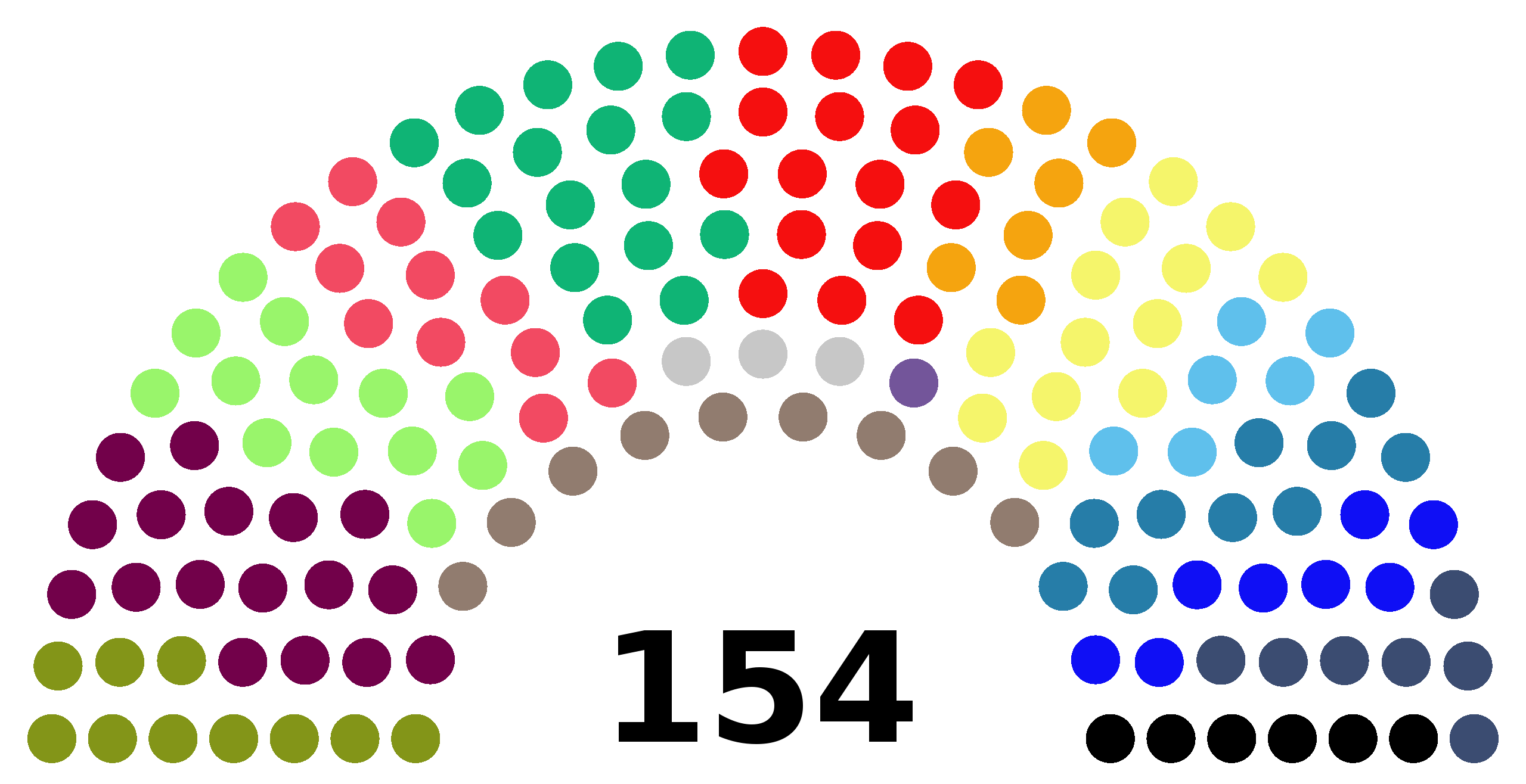
- Political groups: Vamos por Chile Pueblo Constituyente Colectivo Socialista Pueblos originarios Apruebo Dignidad: Frente Amplio + Independientes Independientes por una Nueva Constitución Movimientos Sociales Constituyentes Apruebo Dignidad: Chile Digno Colectivo del Apruebo Independientes Lista del Apruebo La Lista del Pueblo
- Authority: Chapter XV of the Political Constitution of the Republic of Chile of 1980

Elections
- Voting system: Open list proportional representation (D'Hondt method) with gender parity and 17 seats reserved for indigenous peoples

Meeting place
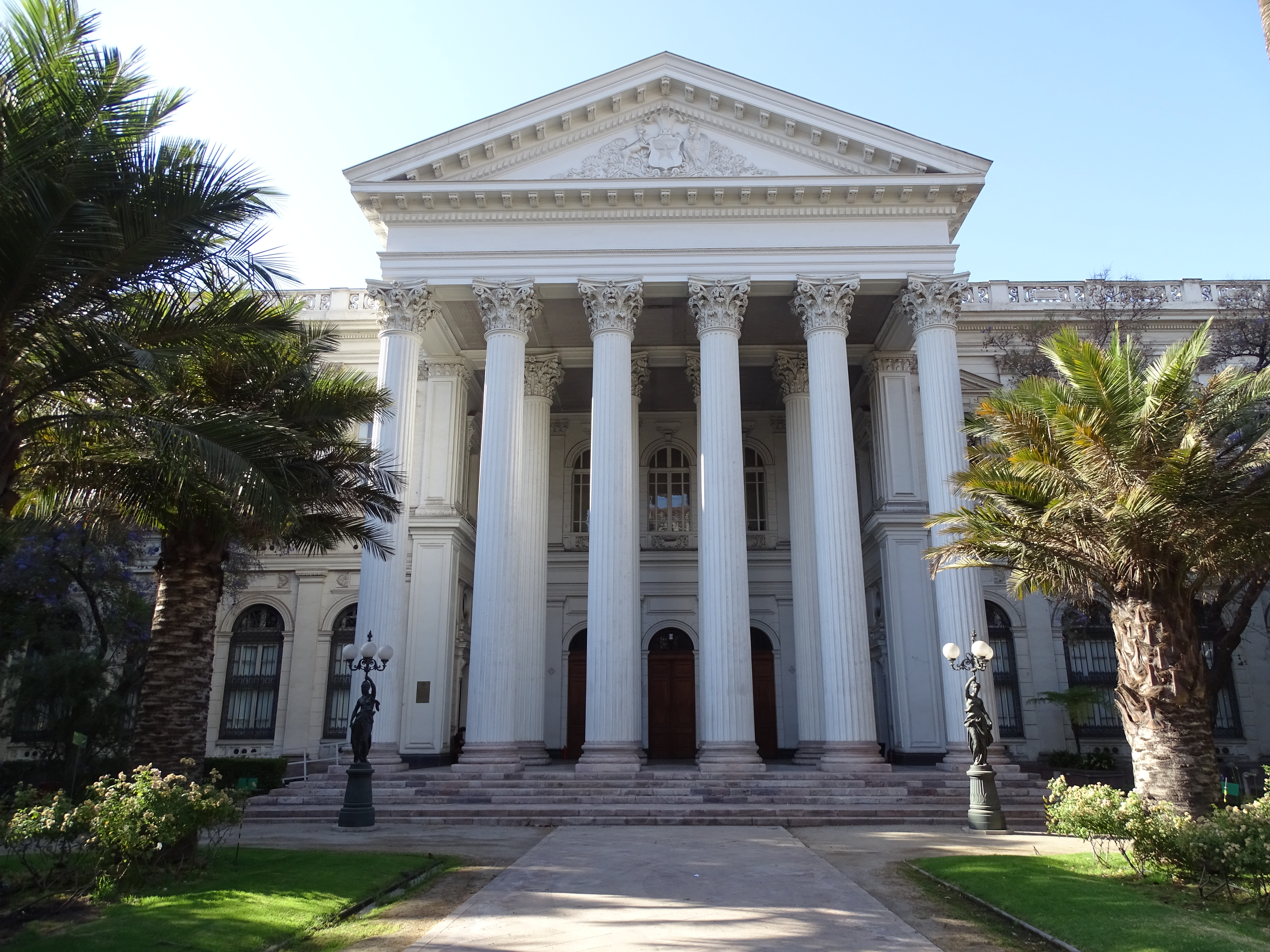
- Former National Congress Building, venue of the plenary sessions.
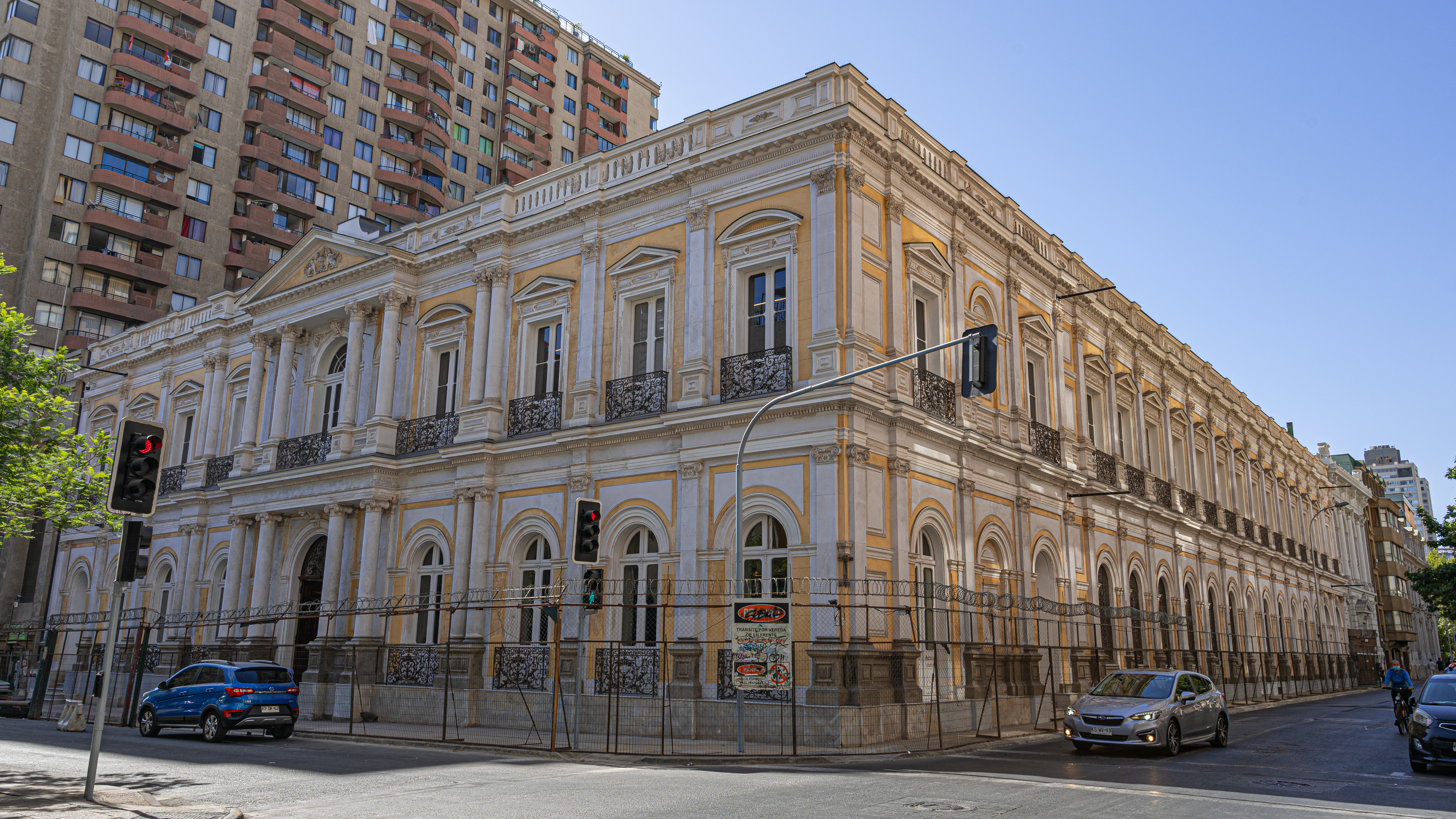
- Pereira Palace, offices and administration.

Website
- https://www.chileconvencion.cl/

The Constitutional Convention (Spanish: Convención Constitucional) was the constituent body of the Republic of Chile in charge of drafting a new Political Constitution of the Republic after the approval of the national plebiscite held in October 2020. Its creation and regulation were carried out through Law No. 21,200, published on 24 December 2019, which amended the Political Constitution of the Republic to include the process of drafting a new constitution. The body met for the first time on 4 July 2021. Chilean president Sebastian Piñera said, "This Constitutional Convention must, within a period of 9 months, extendable for an additional 3 months, draft and approve a new constitution for Chile, which must be ratified by the citizens through a plebiscite." It ended its functions and declared itself dissolved on 4 July 2022.

The proposed constitution, which had faced "intense criticism that it was too long, too left-leaning and too radical", was rejected by a margin of 62% to 38% in the 2022 Chilean national plebiscite.

== Etymology ==
According to Senator Jaime Quintana (PPD), the term "Constitutional Convention" was coined during the drafting of the "Agreement for social peace and the New Constitution" on 14 November 2019; that afternoon he received a communication from Mario Desbordes, then president of National Renewal (RN), in which he requested that the body that drafted the new Political Constitution not be called the "Constituent Assembly" to facilitate the approval of the agreement by right-wing politicians.

According to various academics, such as Claudia Heiss and Francisco Soto, the concept of "Constitutional Convention" would be equivalent to the concept of "Constituent Assembly", insofar as its operation and composition would be the same, and both correspond to collegiate bodies that draft a Constitution. Lawyer Leonel Sánchez points out that the definition of both concepts is similar, based on studies from the United Nations Development Program (UNDP) and cases from other countries with similar constituent bodies. Mario Herrera, an academic at the University of Talca, points out that there are no differences between the Constitutional Convention and a Constituent Assembly, since in both their members are elected by popular vote and their sole purpose is to draft a new Political Constitution.

== Elections and composition ==
The elections to determine the seats of the 155 constituent conventions was held in May 2021. Within thirty days after the election, the elected candidates must be proclaimed and within three days after this ruling must be communicated to the National Congress and the president of the republic; the latter, within 3 days of receiving said communication, must call the installation session of the Constitutional Convention and indicate the place where it will be held (if not indicated, it will be held at the headquarters of the National Congress in Valparaíso).

The installation session of the Constitutional Convention must be held within 15 days after the date the convening decree is published.

The Constitutional Convention will be composed equally by men and women, as well as will have the representation of the native peoples through 17 reserved seats: 7 for the Mapuche people, 2 for the Aymara people and one for each of the other peoples (Kawésqar, Rapanui, Yagán, Quechua, Atacameño, Diaguita, Colla, and Chango).

== Functioning ==
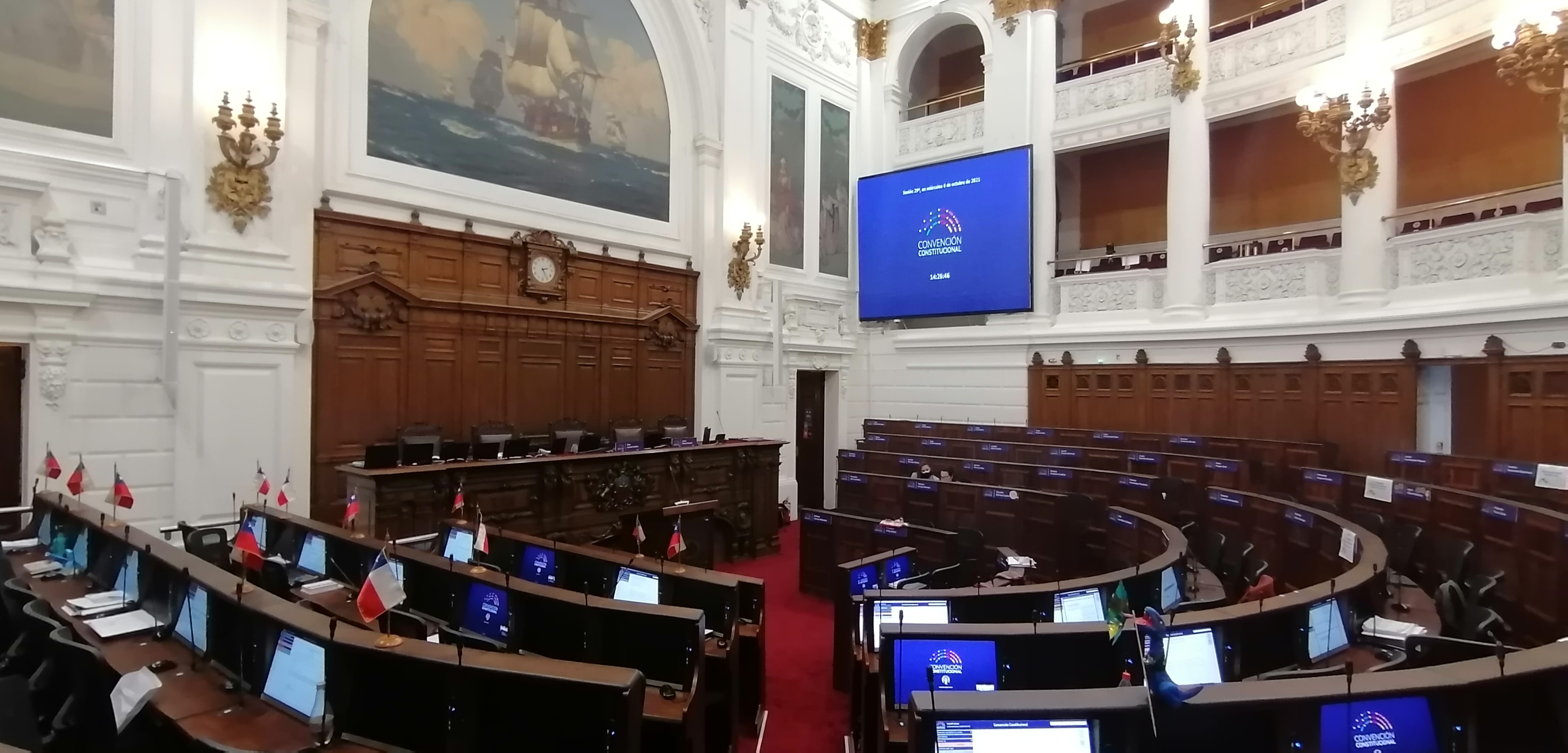
Hemicycle of the Chamber of Deputies of the former National Congress, place where the plenary sessions of the Convention were held.

It was estimated that the Constitutional Convention would begin its sessions between 19 April and 14 May 2021; other sources indicated that the start of sessions should take place at the beginning of June. In the session of installation of the convention, its president and vice president must be elected by an absolute majority of its members. Likewise, it must approve its voting regulations and operating rules by a quorum of two-thirds of its members. The same two-thirds quorum will be applied to make any decision, which implies that the points that do not generate said consensus will be left out of the draft text of the new Political Constitution. In the same way, the current Constitution establishes that the text presented by the Convention must respect the democratic regime, judicial decisions and international treaties.

In the event that there are claims for alleged violations of the procedural rules applicable to the convention, these will be known and resolved by five members of the Supreme Court, chosen by a draw.

The Convention must draft and propose the text of the new Political Constitution of the Republic within a period of nine months, and it may be extended only once for three months. Once the proposed new Constitution is approved by the Convention or the term of the extension expires, the institution will be dissolved.

=== Seat ===
In September 2020, it was proposed that the Constitutional Convention would meet in the palace of the former National Congress of Chile, located in the center of Santiago, as well as the Pereira Palace as a support building to house advisers and administrative officials. However, several parliamentarians demonstrated against occupying the headquarters of the former Congress in Santiago, since according to them other legislative tasks and meetings with civil society are carried out in that building and would not present the necessary infrastructure. Deputy Iván Flores proposed that the convention meets at the Huneeus Palace.

On 23 November 2020, the government entered several indications to the Budget Law for the year 2021, among which are considered items to remodel and enable both the palace of the former National Congress in Santiago and the Pereira Palace in order to house the Constitutional Convention, evaluating the possibility that the plenary sessions are held in the old chamber of the Chamber of Deputies or the Hall of Honor of the former Congress, and that the Pereira Palace as an auxiliary building that houses different commissions and services.

On 11 January 2021, President Sebastián Piñera announced the Pereira Palace as the working headquarters of the Constitutional Convention. The venue will have 15 offices with 102 seats and 11 meeting rooms with a total capacity of 132 seats, as well as a larger room that can host meetings of up to 40 people; There will also be a dining room on the fourth level for the conventional constituents. It was also confirmed that the palace of the former National Congress will be used for plenary sessions and for certain commissions.

=== Election of president and vice-president ===
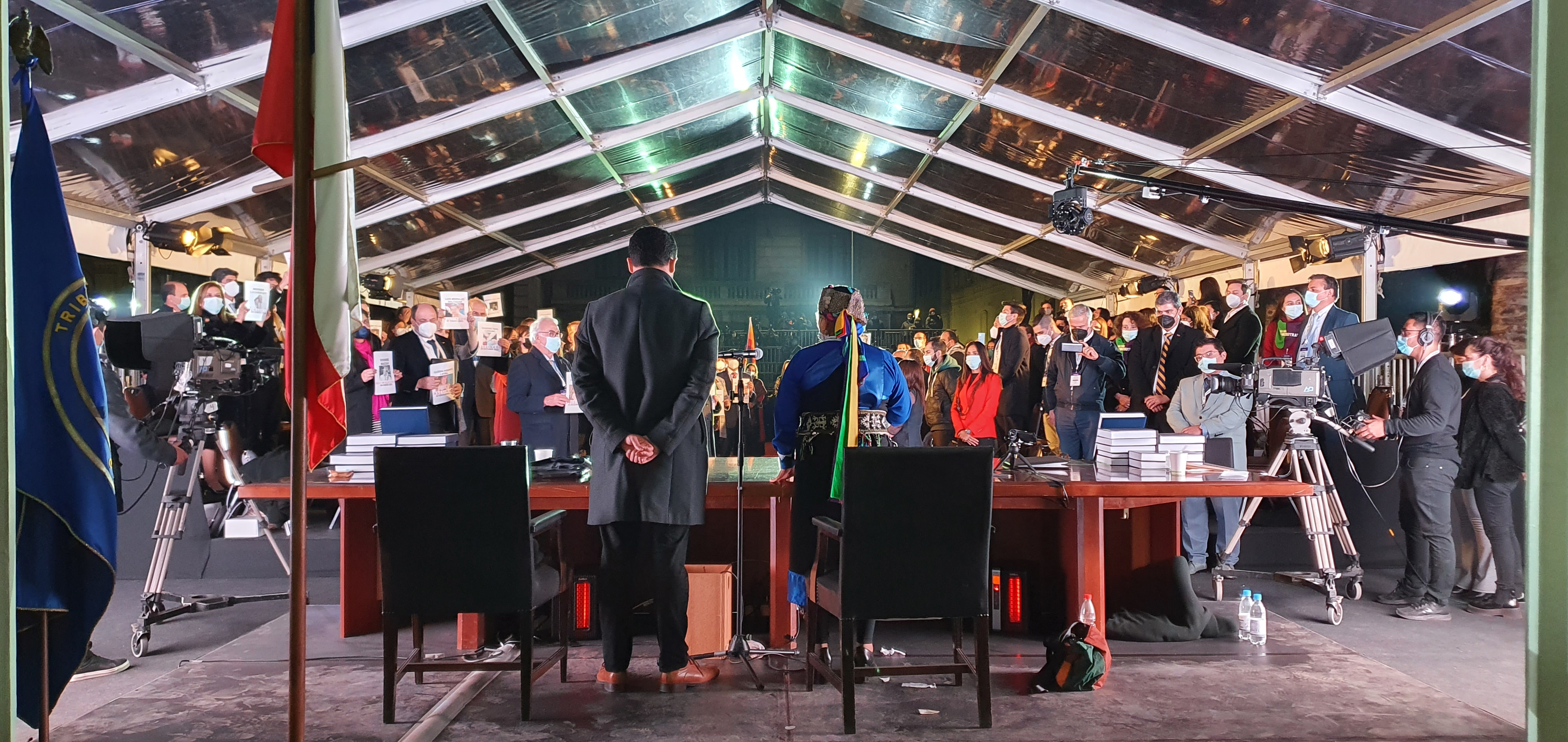
View of the inaugural session of the Constitutional Convention. Jaime Bassa (vice-president) and Elisa Loncón (president) are seen from behind leading the ceremony.

The election of the president of the convention proceeded in two rounds. The first round of voting resulted in a plurality (a majority of 78 being needed):

- Elisa Loncón Antileo (Independent, Mapuche) - 58
- Isabel Godoy Monardez (Independent, Qulla) - 35
- Harry Jürgensen Caesar (Vamos Chile, District 25) - 36
- Patricia Politzer Kerekes (Independent, District 10) - 20

A second round resulted in the election of Loncón as president:

- Elisa Loncón - 96
- Harry Jürgensen - 33
- Patricia Politzer - 18
- Isabel Godoy - 5
- Blank vote - 3

Loncón will be the first person of Mapuche descent to serve as leader of a legislative body in Chile's history.

In three rounds, Jaime Bassa (independent, supported by Social Convergence) was elected as vice-president of the convention.

Shortly after being elected president and vice president, Elisa Loncón and Jaime Bassa declared their aim to discuss a formal petition for the so-called Prisoners of the Revolt. Loncón also mentioned her aim to provide amnesty to indigenous "political prisoners" of the Mapuche conflict.

First-round candidates:

- Jaime Bassa
- Rodrigo Rojas Vade
- Rodrigo Logan
- Renato Garín

== Proposal of constitution ==
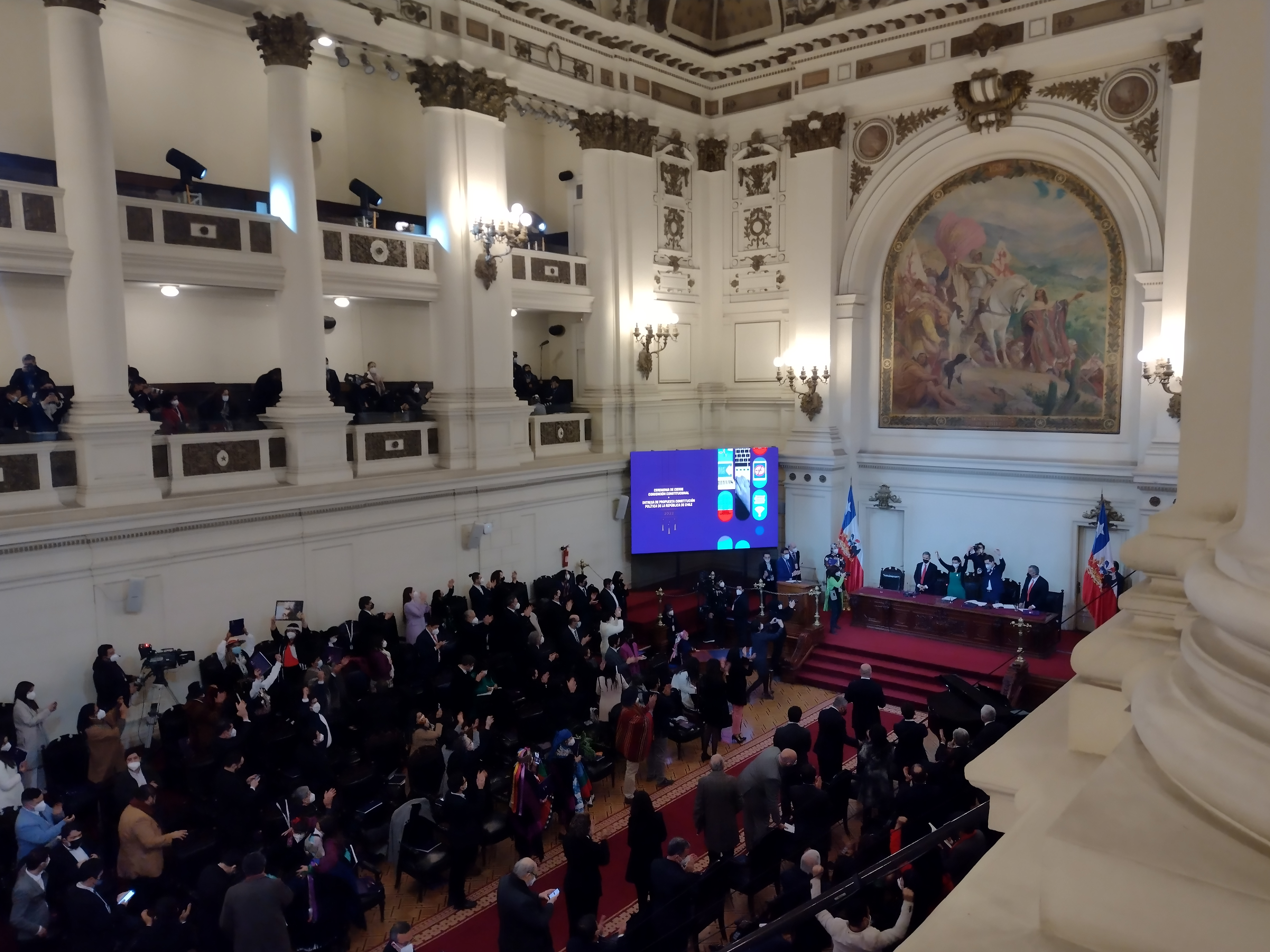
Closing ceremony of the Chilean Constitutional Convention (4 July 2022).

On Monday, 16 May 2022, the Constitutional Convention presented its draft charter. The final Constitution proposal was presented on 4 July 2022, during the closing ceremony of the convention. In that ceremony, president Gabriel Boric signed the decree convoking the national plebiscite for September 4, 2022, where the Constitution was to be subject to approval or rejection by the Chilean citizens.

The proposed Constitution would have retained free-market economics while introducing social rights, and would have reformed the Senate of Chile into an indirectly-elected chamber representing regional councils. Other provisions included a prohibition on gender discrimination and a gender parity mandate for public entities, as well as new environmental protections. Furthermore, a National Health Service and a National Education System would have been instituted to increase access to healthcare and education. A proposal to give the government far-reaching mining rights was defeated and not included in the draft constitution. The same is true for the previously proposed right to housing.

== Referendum ==
The work of the Constitutional Convention concluded with the constitutional referendum, held on 4 September 2022, which was overwhelmingly defeated. The 2022 Proposed Political Constitution of the Republic of Chile was then rejected.

After the referendum the former members of the Constitutional Convention Constanza Schönhaut, César Valenzuela, and Ricardo Montero entered to work in the Boric government.

== See also ==
- Constitutional Convention (United States)
- Convention to propose amendments to the United States Constitution
