= Autonomist Movement =

Chilean political coalition

Autonomist Movement Movimiento Autonomista
- Leaders: Gabriel Boric; Constanza Schönhaut
- Founded: June 2016
- Dissolved: 18 November 2018
- Think tank: Decide Foundation
- Ideology: Autonomism; Libertarian socialism Democratic socialism Political ecology Feminism
- Political position: Left-wing

The Autonomist Movement was a Chilean political movement which was a founding member of the Broad Front on 21 January 2017. One year later, the movement merged into the party Social Convergence alongside Libertarian Left, Socialism and Liberty and New Democracy.

== Notable members ==
- Gabriel Boric
- Constanza Schönhaut
- Jorge Sharp
