= Qulla =

South American Indigenous people

Coordinates: 46.0939°N 9.0542°E

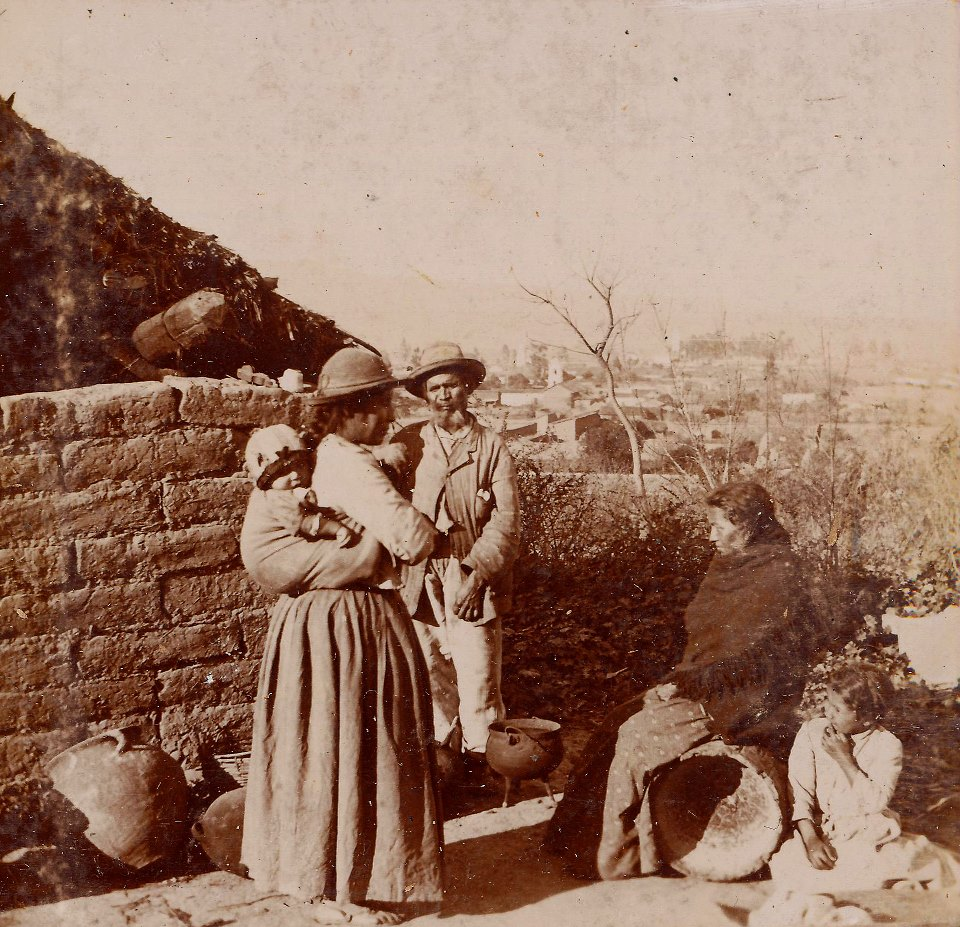
- Kolla population in the Puna towards the end of the 19th century

Total population
- 141,601

Regions with significant populations
- Argentina: 69,121 (2022)
- Bolivia: 51,736 (2011)
- Chile: 21,913 (2024)

Languages
- Northwest Jujuy Quechua, a dialect of Southern Quechua, a Quechua language

Religion
- Animism, Christianity (Roman Catholic Church)

- People: Qulla
- Language: Qichwa
- Country: Qullaw

The Qulla (Quechuan for south, Hispanicized and mixed spellings: Colla, Kolla) are an Indigenous people of western Bolivia, northern Chile, and the western portions of Jujuy and Salta provinces in Argentina. The 2004 Complementary Indigenous Survey reported 53,019 Qulla households living in Argentina. They moved freely between the borders of Argentina and Bolivia. While mostly living in arid highlands, their easternmost lands are part of the yungas, an altitude forests at the edge of the Amazon rainforest.

== History ==
Qulla traditions and historians like Thérèse Bouysse-Cassagne and Teresa Gisbert, in addition to linguist Alfredo Torero, posits a link to the pre-Incan Tiwanaku Polity. The Qulla have lived in their region for centuries. Sillustani is a prehistoric Qulla cemetery in Peru, with elaborate stone chullpas. Several groups made up the Qulla people, including the Zenta, and Gispira. The Qulla came into contact with Spaniards in 1540. They resisted the Spanish invasion for many years but ultimately failed and the Santiago Estate fell into Spanish hands. One particularly famous rebel leader was Ñusta Willaq, a female warrior who fought the Spanish in 1780. With Argentinian independence in 1810, the situation of the Qulla people did not improve and they worked for minimal wages.

On 31 August 1945, Qulla communities in the northwestern Argentine provinces of Jujuy and Salta, through a group of representatives, sent a note to the National Agrarian Council demanding the restitution of their lands, in compliance with previous laws. On 17 January 1946 President Edelmiro Julián Farrell signed the expropriation decree. But as funds for the necessary land surveys and paperwork were in progress, the direction of the Council passed to other people, who blocked them. In 1946, Qulla people joined the Malón de la Paz, a march to the capital of Buenos Aires to demand the return of their lands.

In the 1950s, Qulla people worked in the timber industry on their ancestral lands.

In 1985, the Argentinian government officially recognized the Indigenous peoples of that country by Law 23303. A cholera epidemic took a toll on the Qulla population in the late 20th century. In August 1996, many Qulla people occupied and blocked roads to their traditional lands but were violently stopped by the police. On 19 March 1997, the Qulla people finally regained legal possession of the Santiago Estate.

== Today ==
In the province of Salta, Northern Argentina, Qullamarka is the Coordinating Platform for five different Qulla organizations, including the Kolla Tinkunaku Community is a grassroots organization, which represents four Qulla communities. Two other organizations represent Qulla rights in Argentina: Centro Kolla in Buenos Aires and the Indianista de los Pueblos Kollas. Because they traditionally held their land in common, the Qulla do not have titles of ownership to their lands, which has resulted in displacement. However, the Qulla participate in Argentinian government and hold local elected positions in their region.

The Additional Survey on Indigenous Populations, published by the National Institute for Statistics and Census, gives a total of 600,329 people out of some 40 million in Argentina who see themselves as descending from or belonging to an Indigenous people. For a number of reasons, various Indigenous organisations do not believe this to be a credible survey. Firstly, the methodology used in the survey was considered inadequate, as a large number of Indigenous people live in urban areas, where the survey was not fully conducted. Second, many Indigenous people in the country hide their identity for fear of discrimination. Moreover, when the survey was designed in 2001, it was based on the existence of 18 known peoples in the country, but now, there exist more than 31 groups. That increase reflects a growing awareness amongst Indigenous people in terms of their ethnic belonging.

As many Argentinians believe that the majority of the Indigenous have died out or are on the verge of doing or that their descendants have assimilated into Western civilisation many years ago, they hold the idea that there are no Indigenous people in their country. The use of pejorative terms likening the Indigenous to lazy, idle, dirty, ignorant and savage are part of the everyday language in Argentina. Those stereotypes have forced many Indigenous people, over the years, to hide their identity to avoid racial discrimination.

== Language ==
The Qulla speak Northwest Jujuy Quechua or Qulla, a dialect of South Bolivian Quechua, which is a variety of Southern Quechua, one of the Quechuan languages. The Qulla of the northern Altiplano near Titicaca, however, appear to have originally spoken the Puquina language, also the likely main language of the Tiwanaku culture during the Middle Horizon period.

== Notable Qulla people ==
- Micaela Chauque, Argentine musician
- Isabel Godoy, Chilean politician
- Milagro Sala, Argentine politician and activist
- Natalia Sarapura, Argentine politician
- Alejandro Vilca, Argentine socialist activist and politician
- Ñusta Willaq, female military leader who fought the Spanish in 1780

== See also ==
- Qulla Kingdom
- Qullasuyu
- Collao
