= Jorge Sharp =

Chilean lawyer and politician

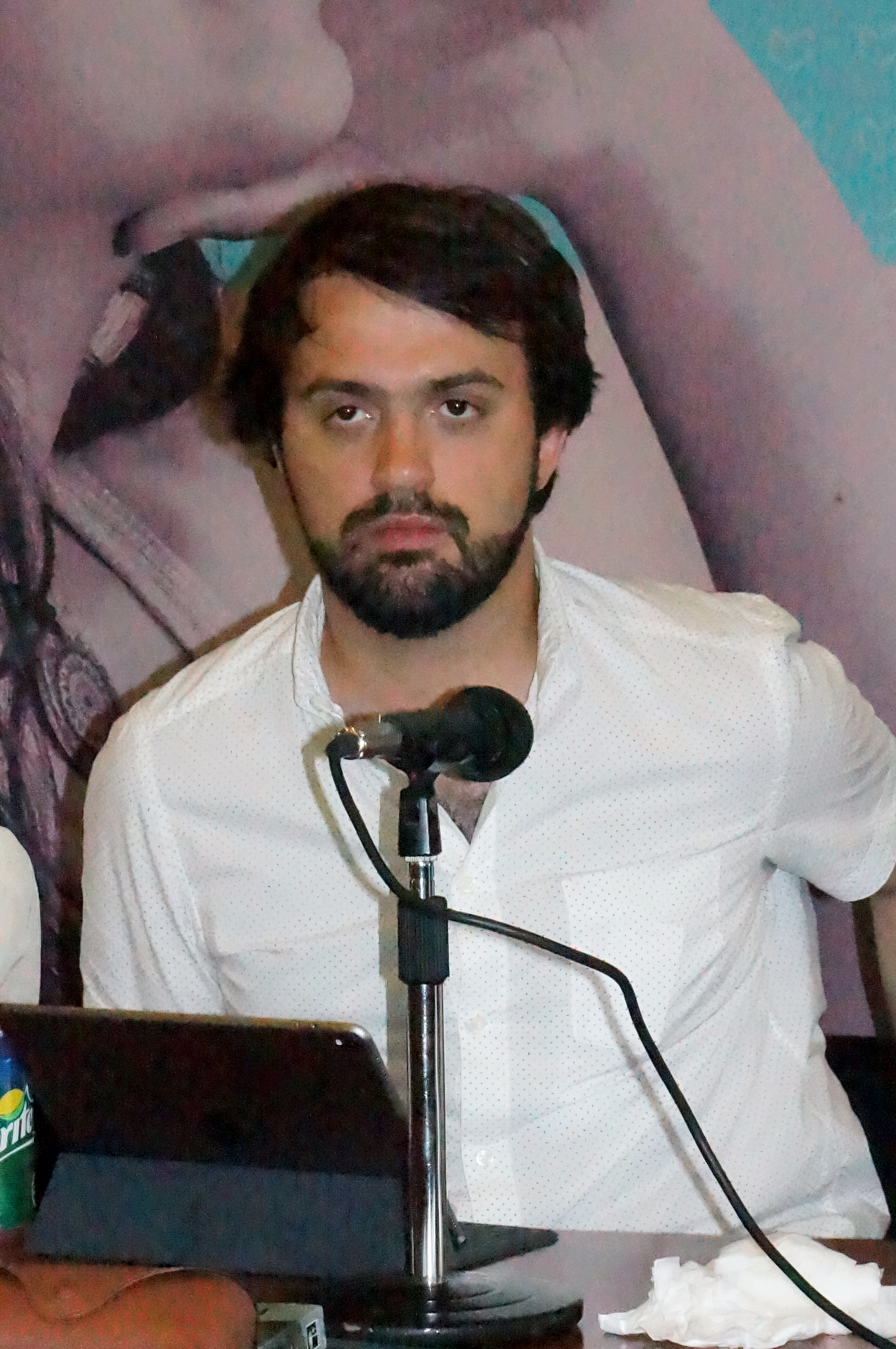
- Sharp at FILSA (2017)

Mayor of Valparaíso
- In office 6 December 2016 – 14 November 2024
- Preceded by: Marina Huerta Rosales
- Succeeded by: Camila Nieto

President of the Pontifical Catholic University of Valparaíso Students Federation
- In office 2009–2010
- Preceded by: Carla Amtmann
- Succeeded by: Nataly Espinoza

Personal details
- Born: 25 March 1985 (age 41) Punta Arenas, Chile
- Party: Autonomous Left (2008–2016); Autonomist Movement (2016–2018); Social Convergence (2018–2019)
- Parent(s): Jorge Sharp Galetovic; Leonor Fajardo
- Education: Pontifical Catholic University of Valparaíso (LL.B)
- Occupation: Politician
- Profession: Lawyer

Jorge Esteban Sharp Fajardo (born 25 March 1985) is a Chilean lawyer and politician. He was the mayor of Valparaíso from 2016 to 2024.

== Early life ==
Born in Punta Arenas, Magallanes Region, he is the son of Leonor Fajardo Filipic and Jorge Sharp Galetovic. His father in 2013 was decorated as a "illustrious citizen" of the Region.

He began as a student leader in Magallanes, being part of FESES' regional re-founding (1999–2000), and his school (Liceo Salesiano San José) student center's president.

== Political career ==
=== University politics ===
In 2003, he moved to Valparaíso to study law at the Pontifical Catholic University of Valparaíso (PUCV). He was a member of the Center for Academic Legal Studies between 2005 and 2006. In 2015 he graduated as a lawyer.

During his university period, Sharp was an active participant in the 2006 student protests in Chile and became a founding member of Autonomous Left (IA), a left-wing organization led by then fellow law student Gabriel Boric. He ran for president of Student Center of the PUCV Law School in 2006, and the following year for president of the PUCV Student Federation (FEPUCV). Sharp did not win either election. In 2008, he was part of the PUCV Student Cordon. Also in 2008, Sharp came to FEPUCV board as vice president; he took over as president of federation in 2009.

=== Mayoralty of Valparaíso ===
In 2016, he presented himself as an Izquierda Autónoma pre-candidate for the "citizen primary" to run for Mayor of Valparaíso in that year's municipal elections of that year, which he won with 1703 votes. The same year, he was one of the leaders who, along with Boric, left Izquierda Autónoma to form Autonomist Movement. In the 23 October election, he was elected Mayor of Valparaíso with 53% of the votes over Jorge Castro, rightist candidate and militant of the Unión Demócrata Independiente (UDI).

In 2021 Chilean municipal elections, he was re-elected as mayor of Valparaíso.
