= Gaspar Domínguez =

Chilean constituent

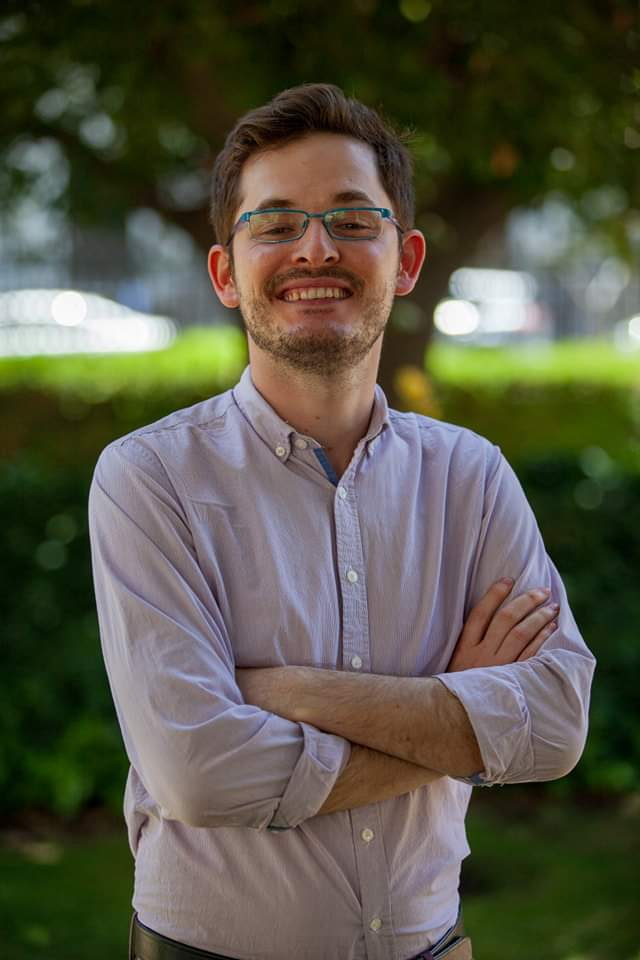

Member of the Constitutional Convention
- In office 4 July 2021 – 4 July 2022
- Constituency: 23rd District

Personal details
- Born: 27 October 1988 (age 37) Santiago, Chile
- Party: Non-Neutral Independents
- Education: University of Chile (BA)
- Occupation: Constituent
- Profession: Physician

Gaspar Domínguez Donoso (born 27 October 1988) is a Chilean physician and independent politician.

He was elected as a member of the Constitutional Convention in 2021, representing the 26th District of the Los Lagos Region.

From January to July 2022, he served as Vice President of the Convention.

== Biography ==
Domínguez was born in Ñuñoa, Santiago, on 27 October 1988. He is the son of Sebastián Domínguez Wagner and Valeria Donoso Concha.

Domínguez completed his primary education at The New School and his secondary education at Liceo José Toribio Medina in Ñuñoa. Between 2007 and 2014, he studied medicine at the University of Chile, graduating as a physician and surgeon in 2014. He later obtained a master's degree in public health from the same university.

He has worked as a physician in rural areas of the Los Lagos Region. Since 2015, he has resided in Palena, where he works at the local hospital.

== Political career ==
Domínguez is an independent politician and a member of the Independents Non-Neutral movement (Independientes No Neutrales).

In the elections held on 15–16 May 2021, he ran as a candidate for the Constitutional Convention representing the 26th District of the Los Lagos Region, as part of the Independientes No Neutrales pact within the Independientes Nueva Constitución list. He obtained 6,400 votes, corresponding to 4.87% of the valid votes cast, and was elected as a member of the Convention.

During the plenary session of the Convention held on 5 January 2022, Domínguez was elected Vice President of the Constitutional Convention. His election was supported by his own collective, Independientes No Neutrales, as well as members of the Broad Front, the Socialist Party of Chile, and other constituents who supported the presidential candidacy of María Elisa Quinteros.
