= Elisa Loncón =

Chilean Indigenous rights activist (born 1963)

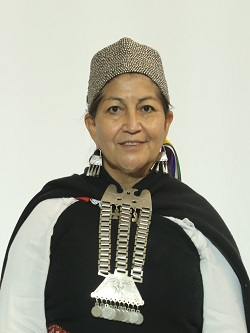
- Loncón dressed in traditional Mapuche garment in 2021

President of the Constitutional Convention
- In office 4 July 2021 – 5 January 2022
- Vice President: Jaime Bassa
- Preceded by: Carmen Gloria Valladares (acting)
- Succeeded by: María Elisa Quinteros

Member of the Constitutional Convention
- In office 4 July 2021 – 4 July 2022
- Constituency: Mapuche people in the Coquimbo, Valparaíso, Santiago, O'Higgins and Maule Regions

Personal details
- Born: Elisa Loncón Antileo; 23 January 1963 (age 63) Lefweluan Community, Traiguén, Chile
- Party: Independent
- Education: University of La Frontera; Pontifical Catholic University of Chile; Leiden University

Elisa Loncón Antileo (born 23 January 1963) is a Mapuche linguist and indigenous rights activist in Chile. In 2021, Loncón was elected as one of the representatives of the Mapuche people for the Chilean Constitutional Convention. Following in the inauguration of the body, Loncón was elected President of the Constitutional Convention. This role, along with her academic career, has placed her at the center of public attention and controversy. In particular, her formal education became a subject of public scrutiny when the Council for Transparency (CPLT) demanded the release of her academic records, igniting a debate about the intersection of race, class, and public transparency in Chile.

== Background and early life ==
Elisa Loncón was born in Lefweluan, a Mapuche community near Traiguén, Araucanía Region. One of Loncón's great-grandfathers fought the Chilean government during the invasion of Araucanía (1861–1883) and was a close ally of chief José Santos Quilapán. Loncón's family was involved in the recovery of land ownership before and during the Chilean land reform (1962–1973). As a consequence land recovery activism, Loncón's maternal grandfather, Ricardo Antileo, spent time in jail during the Pinochet-era military dictatorship. Elisa's father was a bullock-driver who learned to read at 17. He later learned carpentry and made this his occupation. Her father's developed his interest in reading and writing by buying a typewriter. Her mother grew food and sold vegetables in the local markets. Loncón recalled it was her mother, who was fond of poetry, who taught her to read.

Loncón grew up in poverty and food insecurity. Her childhood house was a ruca with dirt floor. In a 2017 interview, Loncón stated that the local Mapuche ceremonial centre in Lefweluan was destroyed in favour of a landfill site, and watched her brothers develop skin infections while playing in the garbage. Loncón says she had a happy childhood, playing often with her siblings and cousins. One of her grandmothers, a monolingual Mapuche speaker, went periodically to Traiguén and told her often "about the city". Loncón remembers her father once sold two carts of firewood to buy books for his family. Many of the books in her home were about the history of Chile and philosophy. Her father had a vast knowledge of the Mapuche oral tradition of history which she absorbed. Another relative taught her about "animals and birds" from the Mapuche oral tradition. Loncón begun first grade school at Escuela Particular no. 41 de Nahuelhuan at five years age since there was no Kindergarten available, and her mother had her three younger siblings to care for. She stayed at that school until fourth grade.

Her brother Lautaro Loncón is a prominent Mapuche activist and political figure who served as indigenous secretary of the Party for Democracy.

== University education and academic career ==
Loncón had originally intended to study history, but was denied entry as she did not achieve the necessary score on the Prueba de Aptitud Académica. Instead, she chose to study English at the University of La Frontera. She was called the "second María Catrileo" by university staff, as both were Mapuches who studied English. During this time, Loncón was also part of a Mapuche-language theater group, touring Mapuche communities in the region.

Loncón then pursued postgraduate studies at the International Institute of Social Studies in The Hague, aided by her connections to Chilean exiles living in the Netherlands. She also studied at the University of Regina and the Metropolitan Autonomous University, before receiving her PhD from Leiden University and her doctorate in literature from the Pontifical Catholic University of Chile.

After graduating, Loncón became a professor at the University of Santiago, focusing her research and writing several books on the teaching of the Mapuche language. She worked as an interpreter for VTR during Pope John Paul II's 1987 visit to Chile.

== Activism and political involvement ==
While at university in 1983, Loncón joined the wave of protests against the military dictatorship that swept through the country. The rector of the university Heinrich von Baer identified Loncón and other participating students and threatened to expel them if they took part of any further protests. She was part of the Ad Mapu cultural organization and the Aukiñ Wallmapu Ngulam (AWNg or Consejo de Todas las Tierras in Spanish). As part of the AWNg, she participated in the design of the Mapuche flag, the Wenufoye. The flag was designed in the context of the upcoming 500th anniversary of the discovery of America by Columbus in 1992. As the King of Spain Juan Carlos I planned to visit Chile for the anniversary Loncón recalls: "we were going to say no to the King of Spain for all of what that [colonization] meant to us".

She was recognized as one of the BBC's 100 women of 2021.

== Constitutional Convention ==
In 2021, Loncón was a candidate for the Chilean Constitutional Convention, running to represent the Mapuche of the Coquimbo, Valparaíso, Santiago, O'Higgins and Maule regions, and was elected.

=== Constitutional Convention presidential election ===
Early reports suggested Machi Francisca Linconao was seen as "the natural candidate" for indigenous members of the Constitutional Convention to support for president of the body. However, Linconao declined to run, instead proposing that Loncón stand for the presidency of the convention during a Winter solstice meeting held in her house in Padre Las Casas.

Loncón agreed to run for the presidency and was elected on 4 July 2021 after the convention was inaugurated. Loncón received 96 votes in the second round, mainly from the left (Apruebo Dignidad, The List of the People) and center-left coalitions (part of Constituent Unity).

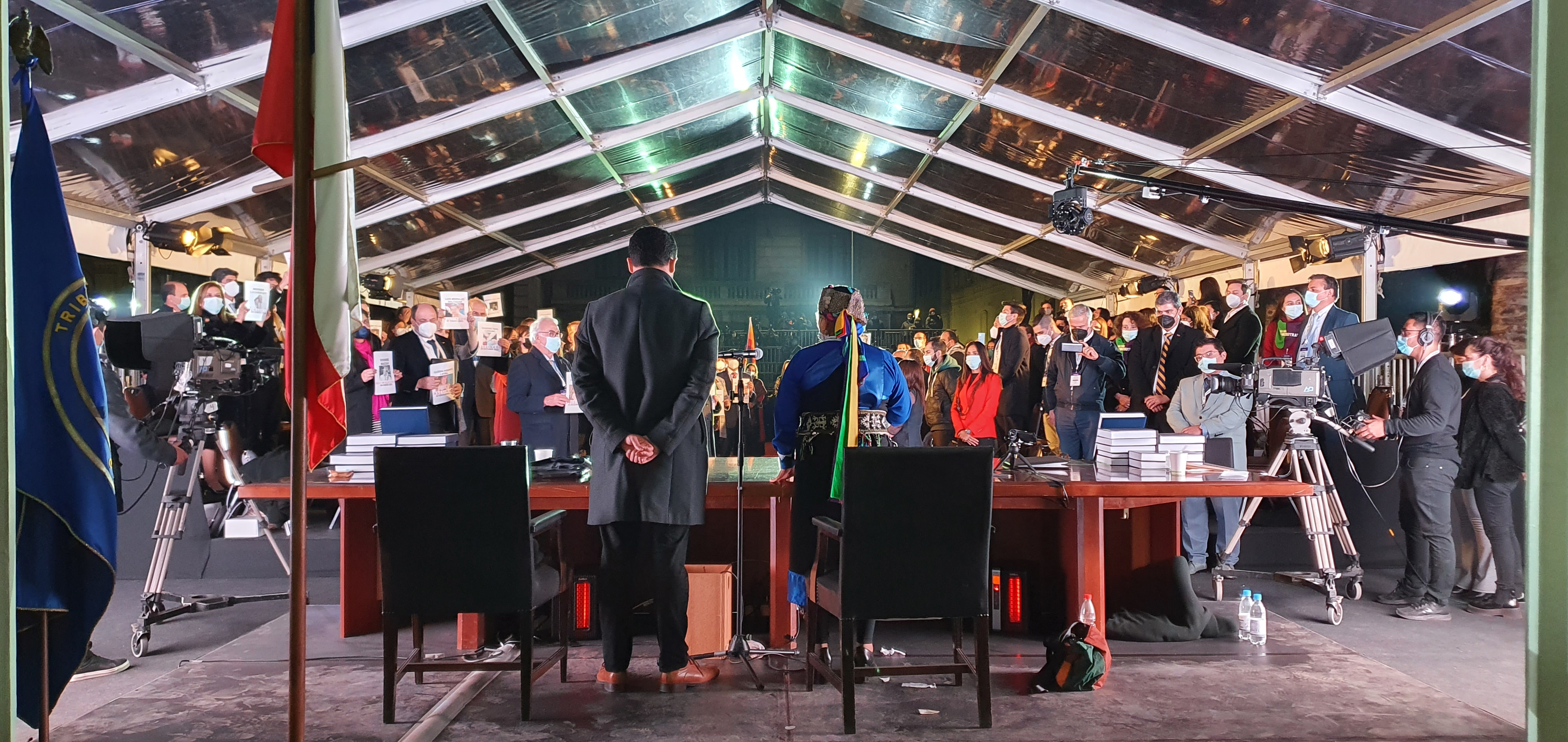
Inaugural session of the Chilean Constitutional Convention on 4 July 2021. Loncón is seen standing on the right.

Pundits interpreted her victory over Isabel Godoy in the first round as a victory of the Broad Front coalition over the Communist Party, both of whom are part of Apruebo Dignidad. Fellow Mapuche activist and convention member Natividad Llanquileo chose to cast a blank vote instead of supporting Loncón, alleging that Loncón is too closely affiliated with the former Concertación. Loncón pushed back against allegations that her support from the Concertación was a result of her brother Lautaro Loncón's position within the Party for Democracy, which she deemed racist and patriarchal.

Loncón's victory was greeted as a historic victory for Chile's indigenous peoples and received international attention. Communist Party nominee Daniel Jadue was the first 2021 presidential candidate to congratulate Loncón on her victory. Following Loncón's election, President of Chile Sebastián Piñera stated: "I wish you wisdom, prudence and strength to guide the Convention towards a new Constitution".

=== Presidential tenure ===
Shortly after being elected President of the Constitutional Convention, Loncón declared her aim to discuss terms for the release of the Prisoners of the Revolt and indigenous political prisoners.

Having denounced harassment and threats to Loncón, on 20 July 2021, she was assigned two female escorts of the Carabineros de Chile for security. Besides direct threats, Loncón has faced persistent criticism and attacks from a group of about 8,000 unique Twitter accounts. Much criticism of her has been identified as part of a larger smear campaign against the Constitutional Convention by voters of the "reject" option in the 2020 Chilean national plebiscite. On July 27, 2021, the hashtag "#DestitucionDeElisaLoncon" aiming to promote an impeachment of Loncón became a trending topic in Twitter and was featured in large Chilean media outlets. The originator of the campaign scores as an "echo-chamber" type of account in the Botometer project.

She was criticized by right-wing members of the Constitutional Convention for her recurrent use of Mapudungun when speaking in the convention.

Loncón has helped to build a "plurinational library" in the Constitutional Convention and bought for that purpose books by Humberto Maturana, Ximena Dávila, Frantz Fanon, Christo Brand, Linda Tuhiwai, Silvia Rivera Cusicanqui. Loncón also bought the books Küme mongen, Suma qamaña, Mo ora riva riva. Ensayos y propuestas para una constitución plurinacional and Maben ñi Puji by multiple authors.
