= Same-sex marriage in Chile =

Same-sex marriage has been legal in Chile since 10 March 2022. In June 2021, President Sebastián Piñera announced his administration's intention to sponsor a bill to open marriage to same-sex couples. The Chilean Senate passed the legislation on 21 July, followed by the Chamber of Deputies on 23 November. Due to disagreements between the two chambers of the National Congress, a mixed commission was formed to resolve these issues. It approved a unified version of the bill on 7 December. Piñera signed it into law on 9 December, and it was published in the country's official gazette on 10 December 2021. The law took effect 90 days later, and the first same-sex marriages occurred on 10 March 2022. Chile was the sixth country in South America, (Note: After Argentina, Brazil, Uruguay, Colombia, and Ecuador) the seventh in Latin America and the 29th in the world to legalize same-sex marriage. Polling suggests that a majority of Chileans support the legal recognition of same-sex marriage.

Chile also recognizes civil unions, which are available to all couples regardless of sexual orientation and provide some, but not all, of the rights of marriage. The first civil unions were registered on 22 October 2015.

== Civil unions ==
=== Bachelet's first presidency ===
In the January 2006 presidential campaign, both major candidates, center-left Michelle Bachelet and center-right Sebastián Piñera, voiced their support for civil unions, but the Catholic Church and many members of the National Congress were opposed. A civil union bill was introduced to the National Congress in October 2009, but it failed to pass.

=== Piñera's first presidency ===
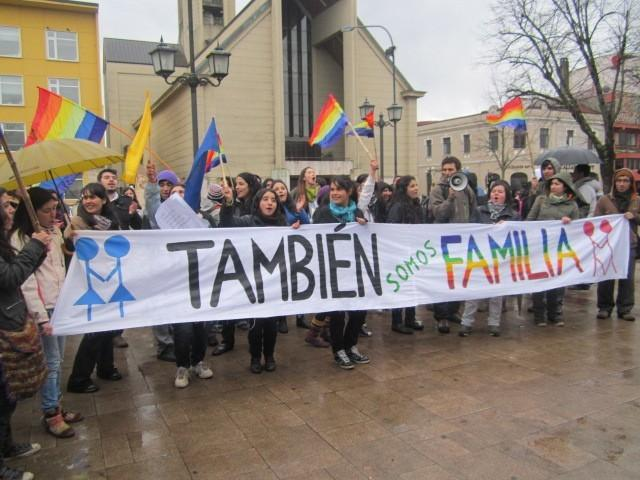
Activists in Valdivia campaigning for the legalization of same-sex civil unions, with a banner reading "We are families too", 2011

During his run-up to the presidency in 2009, Piñera vowed to end discrimination based on sexual orientation and included a same-sex couple in one of his televised campaign ads. In June 2010, Senator Andrés Allamand from the National Renewal party submitted a bill to permit a "Common Life Agreement" (Spanish: Acuerdo de Vida en Común), which would have been open to both different-sex and same-sex couples. On 3 August 2010, Senator Fulvio Rossi from the Socialist Party introduced a bill to legalize same-sex marriage. During the first week of September 2010, several senators backing the marriage bill said they would withdraw their support after talks with members of the Evangelical Church, and instead announced support for Allamand's civil union bill.

In May 2011, President Piñera said he was in favor of an upcoming bill to legalize a form of civil union; his stated intent was to "protect and safeguard [...] the dignity of those couples, whether of the opposite or even the same sex". Piñera introduced a bill to Congress in August 2011 allowing registered cohabitation, known as "Life Partnership Agreement" (Acuerdo de Vida en Pareja). This would have given unmarried partners many of the legal rights of marriage, such as inheritance and certain social welfare and health care benefits. Under Piñera's legislation, same-sex couples would have been able to register their civil partnerships with a notary. On 10 April 2013, the civil union bill was approved by the Senate's Constitution, Law and Justice Committee by a 4–1 vote. On 7 January 2014, the Senate voted 28–6 in favor, but the bill was not voted on by the Chamber of Deputies before the end of the parliamentary session in March 2014, despite it being a priority issue for Piñera.

=== Bachelet's second presidency ===
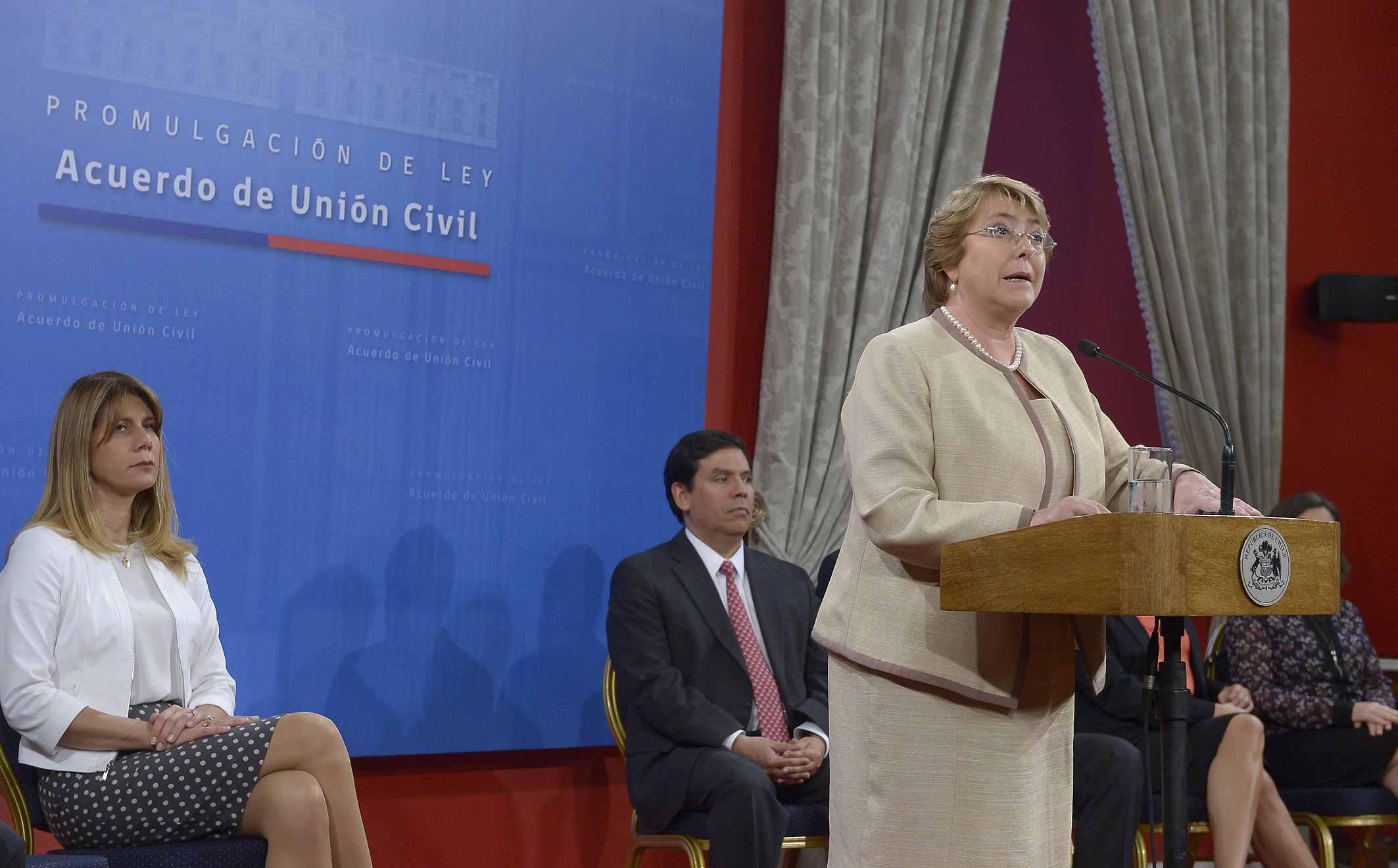
President Michelle Bachelet promulgating the civil union law, 13 April 2015

When Michelle Bachelet again took office as president in March 2014, she made passing Piñera's civil union bill a priority. A Senate committee approved the bill on 5 August, and it passed the Senate on 7 October. The name of the bill was changed to "Civil Union Pact" (Spanish: Pacto de Unión Civil) on 17 December, and Congress reiterated its intention to hold a final vote by January 2015. On 6 January, a provision recognizing foreign marriages as civil unions was approved by the Constitution Committee of the Chamber of Deputies, while a clause recognizing adoption rights was rejected. As the bill was amended, it went to a final vote in both the Senate and the Chamber of Deputies. On 13 January, the Chamber of Deputies reinserted the adoption provision, and on 20 January it approved the bill on a vote of 86 to 23 with 2 abstentions. The Senate rejected all the Chamber's amendments on 27 January, so the bill was referred to a joint congressional committee. The committee reached an agreement regarding the bill's text and changed the name to "Civil Union Agreement" (Spanish: Acuerdo de Unión Civil, pronounced [aˈkweɾðo ðewˈnjon siˈβil]) the same day. The bill was passed in both houses on 28 January. Several lawmakers asked the Constitutional Court to verify the bill's constitutionality, which was upheld by the court in a ruling released on 6 April 2015. The bill was signed into law by President Bachelet on 13 April. It was published in the Diario Oficial de la República de Chile on 21 April and took effect on 22 October 2015.

Chile's civil union provisions enable couples to claim pension benefits, inherit property and make medical decisions for partners, but exclude adoption rights. All disputes and conflicts involving civil partners are dealt with by the family courts (tribunales de familia). The government estimated at the time of the law going into effect that some two million cohabiting couples could have their unions legally recognized. Approximately 1,600 couples had signed up to register their unions by the first day. The first same-sex civil union on Easter Island was performed in November 2015. On 1 December 2016, the Chamber of Deputies unanimously passed a bill granting civil partners five days' marriage leave, similarly to newly married couples. The bill was approved by the Senate in October 2017 in a unanimous 15–0 vote, and took effect on 8 November 2017.

=== Statistics ===
101,715 couples entered into civil unions between 2015 and 2025, of which 15% were same-sex couples (7,906 female couples and 7,281 male couples). This proportion was higher between October and December 2015 when 28.7% of civil unions were to same-sex couples.

Between 2016 and 2019, 248,567 marriages and 22,951 civil unions were performed in Chile, of which 5,950 were to same-sex couples. Most civil unions were performed in the Santiago Metropolitan Region (44%), followed by the Valparaíso Region (14%). Considering population, the region with the largest number of civil unions was Antofagasta (7.6 per 10,000 inhabitants), while the lowest was Araucanía (2.0 per 10,000 inhabitants). The Santiago Metropolitan Region also had the largest share of same-sex civil unions compared to opposite-sex unions (27%), followed by O'Higgins (22%) and Valparaíso (20%). On the other hand, Aysén had the lowest share of same-sex unions (8%), followed by Los Ríos (11%), Coquimbo (12%) and Magallanes (12%).

Number of civil unions registered in Chile
Year	Same-sex unions			Opposite-sex unions	Total unions	% same-sex
Year	Female	Male	Total	Opposite-sex unions	Total unions	% same-sex
2015	274	357	631	1,566	2,197	28.72%
2016	744	854	1,598	5,676	7,274	21.97%
2017	662	613	1,275	4,947	6,222	20.49%
2018	740	743	1,483	5,773	7,256	20.44%
2019	851	743	1,594	6,555	8,149	19.56%
2020	583	529	1,112	4,216	5,328	20.87%
2021	989	814	1,803	6,858	8,661	20.82%
2022	545	464	1,009	7,908	8,917	11.32%
2023	538	493	1,031	10,714	11,745	8.78%
2024	829	749	1,578	14,688	16,266	9.70%
2025	1,151	922	2,073	17,627	19,700	10.5%

== Same-sex marriage ==
Recognition of same-sex unions in South America Marriage Other type of partnership Unrecognized Constitution limits marriage to opposite-sex couples Same-sex sexual activity illegal, though penalties not enforced

=== Background and court cases ===
The first attempts to legalize same-sex marriage in Chile occurred after the ban was legally challenged in various national and international courts in the early 2010s. The Constitutional Court of Chile heard oral arguments on 28 July 2011 regarding the constitutionality of article 102 of the Civil Code, which at the time banned same-sex marriage, but ruled in a 9–1 vote on 3 November that the ban was not unconstitutional. The ban was challenged at the Inter-American Court of Human Rights (IACHR) in 2012. This lawsuit alleged that banning same-sex marriage violated the American Convention on Human Rights and Chile's international obligations. The Piñera Government expressed its opposition to the suit in 2013. Even though some minor presidential candidates had announced their support for same-sex marriage, Michelle Bachelet was the first major candidate to declare her support in the lead up to the November 2013 presidential elections. On 11 April 2013, she announced her intention to legalize same-sex marriage if elected president. Bachelet, who had previously been president of Chile between 2006 and 2010, won the election on 15 December 2013. After Bachelet's inauguration in March 2014, the Homosexual Integration and Liberation Movement (MOVILH; Movimiento de Integración y Liberación Homosexual) announced it would seek an amicable solution to the lawsuit presented to the Inter-American Court of Human Rights. On 10 December 2014, a group of senators from various parties presented a bill legalizing same-sex marriage and adoption to the National Congress. On 17 February 2015, government lawyers and MOVILH met to discuss the case, and the government announced it would drop its opposition to same-sex marriage. A formal agreement between the two parties and the Inter-American Commission of Human Rights was signed in April 2015.

On 1 July 2016, the government announced it would begin consultations on a same-sex marriage bill in September 2016, with the aim of finalizing it by mid-2017, and said it viewed a ban on same-sex marriage as a "human rights violation". President Bachelet stated before a United Nations General Assembly panel in September 2016 that the government would submit a bill to Congress "in the first half of 2017." In June 2017, she announced in a speech to Congress that the bill would be introduced in the second half of 2017. It was later confirmed that the bill would grant married same-sex couples equal adoption rights. The bill was introduced to Congress on 28 August, before being submitted to the Senate on 5 September. According to the newspaper La Tercera, a majority of lawmakers elected in the November parliamentary elections was in favor of same-sex marriage. The Senate's Constitution, Legislation, Justice, and Regulation Committee began examining the bill on 27 November. Two days prior, an estimated 100,000 people had marched in Santiago in favor of the bill's passage. Participants included many lawmakers and diplomats, including presidential candidate Alejandro Guillier. On 17 December, Sebastián Piñera was re-elected president of Chile. Though personally opposed to same-sex marriage at the time, Piñera said he would respect the April 2015 agreement with the Inter-American Commission of Human Rights, saying that "Chile's international commitments will be fulfilled". In the wake of a January 2018 IACHR advisory opinion that parties to the American Convention on Human Rights should grant same-sex couples "accession to all existing domestic legal systems of family registration, including marriage, along with all rights that derive from marriage", MOVILH urged Piñera to implement the decision. In early March 2018, a government spokesperson said that passing the same-sex marriage bill would not be a "priority", but that Piñera would not veto or oppose it. In early April 2018, the Inter-American Commission on Human Rights summoned the Chilean Government to a meeting to discuss the status of the measures included in the 2015 agreement. At the meeting, which took place in the Dominican Republic on 3 May, the government informed the Commission that it would "continue to respect" the agreement. On 17 May 2018, the International Day Against Homophobia, Transphobia and Biphobia, Piñera signed the agreement and pledged to continue the work of the previous administration toward legalizing same-sex marriage.

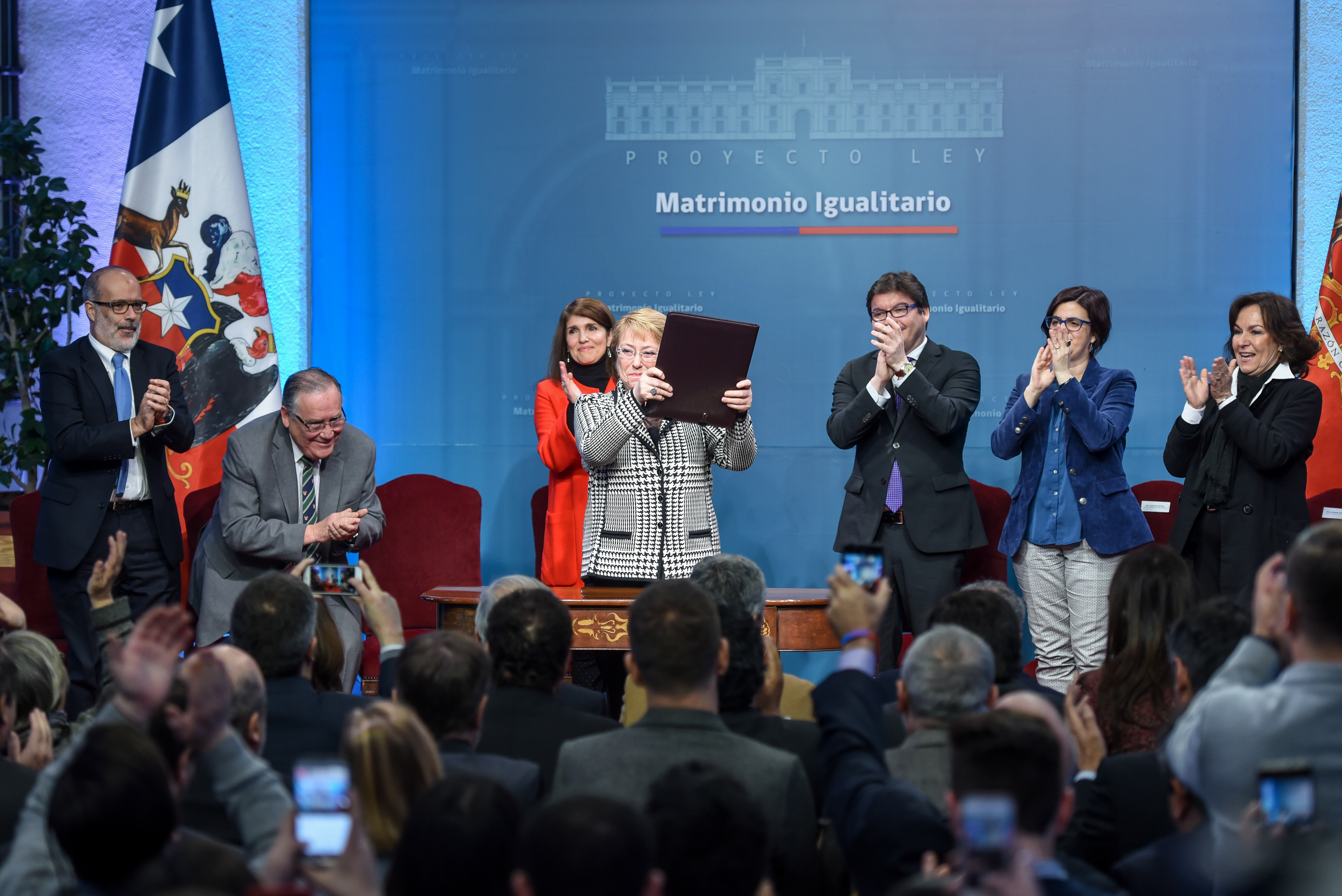
President Michelle Bachelet introducing the same-sex marriage bill to Congress, 28 August 2017

On 10 June 2016, the Third Chamber of the Court of Appeals of Santiago rejected another lawsuit challenging the ban. The court ruled that as Chilean legislation did not permit same-sex marriages, the civil registry could not issue marriage licenses to same-sex couples. It also held that opening marriage to same-sex couples was a decision for Congress to address, and not the courts. In December 2018, the Supreme Court of Chile recognized marriage as a fundamental right, in a case legal experts suggested may pave the way for same-sex marriage to be legalized in Chile. Shortly after the ruling was issued, a same-sex couple challenged the same-sex marriage ban in court. On 26 April 2019, after the Supreme Court referred the case back to the Santiago Court of Appeals due to a probable constitutional violation, the latter ruled that denying the couple a marriage license was not illegal. The plaintiffs appealed the ruling to the Supreme Court; however, the appeal was dismissed.

=== Parliamentary debate and approval ===
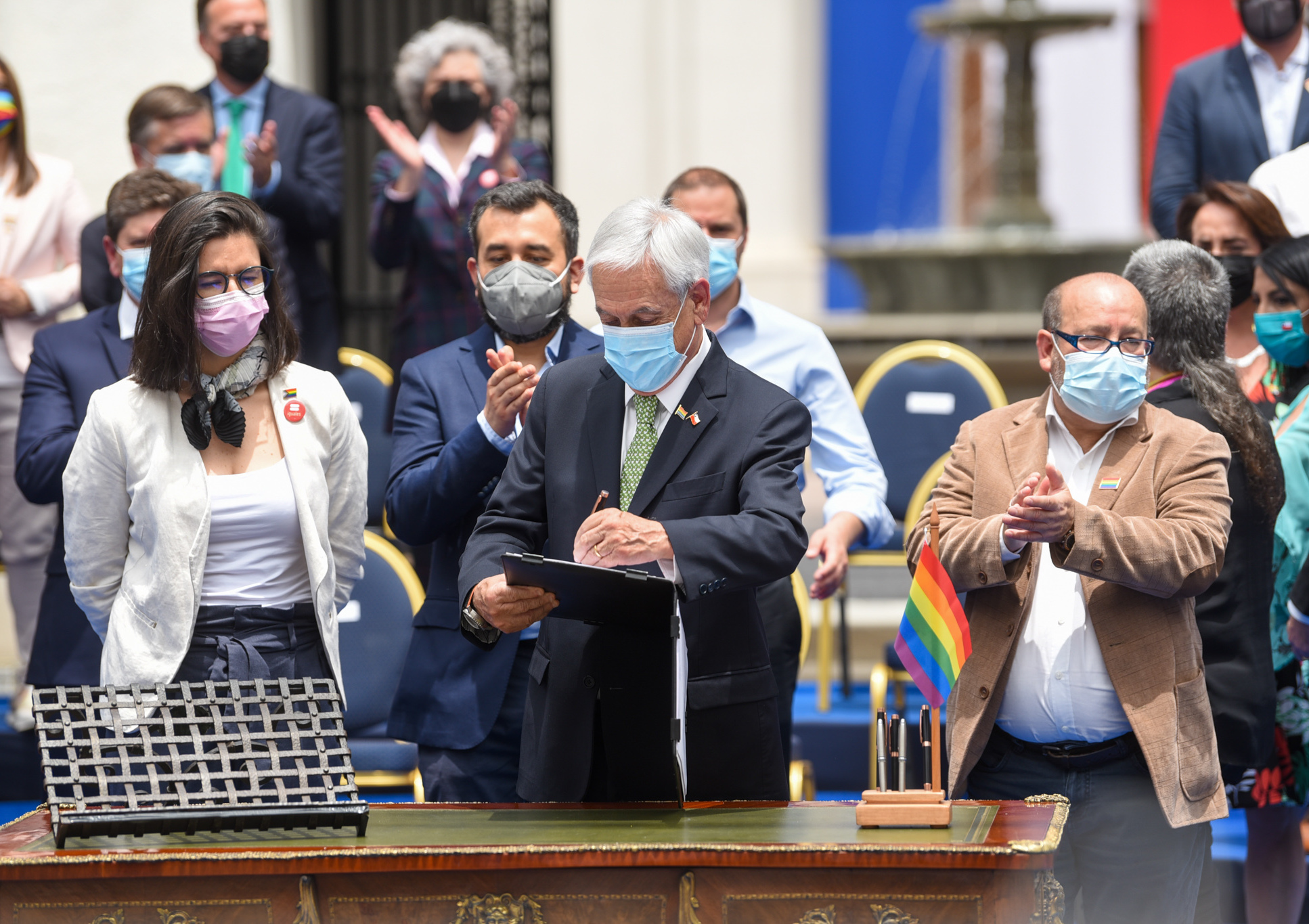
President Sebastian Piñera signing the same-sex marriage bill into law on 9 December 2021, making Chile the sixth country in South America to legalize same-sex marriage

Committee debate on the same-sex marriage bill resumed on 9 January 2019, and continued in May. In May, Senate President Jaime Quintana said that the bill, along with a bill permitting same-sex couples to adopt, would be given "priority" in the Senate agenda. In July, upon assuming his role as chairman of the Constitution Committee, Senator Felipe Harboe began fast-tracking the procedure of the same-sex marriage bill, as opposition parties announced their intention to push for debate in Congress before going into recess in February 2020. On 15 January, the bill was approved at first reading in the Senate by 22 votes to 16. In October 2020, it was reported that the Constitution Committee had approved 29 of the articles in the bill, with 27 remaining to be approved.

On 1 June 2021, during his last annual address to the National Congress, Piñera announced that his government would support the bill and place urgency on bringing it forward to a vote. The Senate approved the legislation by 28 votes to 14 on 21 July. The bill then moved to the Chamber of Deputies. It was approved by the Constitution Committee of the Chamber of Deputies on 13 October, and by the Finance Committee on 2 November. On 23 November, the Chamber of Deputies approved an amended version of the legislation by 101 votes to 30.

21 July 2021 vote in the Senate
Party	Voted for	Voted against	Abstained	Absent (Did not vote)
Independent Democratic Union	–	8: Claudio Alvarado; José Durana; Luz Ebensperger; Alejandro García-Huidobro; Iván Moreira; David Sandoval; Jacqueline van Rysselberghe; Ena von Baer	–	1: Juan Antonio Coloma Correa
National Renewal	3: Rodrigo Galilea; Rafael Prohens; Marcela Sabat	4: Juan Castro Prieto; Francisco Chahuán; José García Ruminot; Manuel José Ossandón	–	–
Socialist Party	7: Isabel Allende; Alfonso de Urresti; Álvaro Elizalde; José Miguel Insulza; Juan Pablo Letelier; Carlos Montes Cisternas; Rabindranath Quinteros	–	–	–
Party for Democracy	6: Loreto Carvajal; Guido Girardi; Ricardo Lagos Weber; Adriana Muñoz D'Albora; Jaime Quintana; Jorge Soria	–	–	–
Christian Democratic Party	5: Carolina Goic; Francisco Huenchumilla; Jorge Pizarro; Yasna Provoste; Ximena Rincón	–	–	–
Democratic Revolution	1: Juan Ignacio Latorre	–	–	–
Evópoli	1: Felipe Kast	–	–	–
Progressive Party	1: Alejandro Navarro	–	–	–
Independent	4: Pedro Araya Guerrero; Carlos Bianchi Chelech; Alejandro Guillier; Ximena Órdenes	2: Carmen Gloria Aravena; Kenneth Pugh Olavarría	–	–
Total	28	14	0	1
Total	65.1%	32.6%	0.0%	2.3%

23 November 2021 vote in the Chamber of Deputies
Party	Voted for	Voted against	Abstained	Absent (Did not vote)
National Renewal	12: Bernardo Berger; Andrés Celis Montt; Sofía Cid; Jorge Durán; Tomás Fuentes; Andrés Longton; Karin Luck; Camilo Morán; Paulina Núñez; Diego Paulsen; Hugo Rey; Sebastián Torrealba	16: José Miguel Castro; Catalina Del Real; Eduardo Durán; Francisco Eguiguren Correa; Camila Flores; René Manuel García; Harry Jürgensen; Carlos Kuschel; Miguel Mellado; Francesca Muñoz; Ximena Ossandón; Leopoldo Pérez; Jorge Rathgeb; Leonidas Romero; Frank Sauerbaum; Diego Schalper	1: Aracely Leuquén Uribe	4: Gonzalo Fuenzalida; Ramón Galleguillos; Luis Pardo Sainz; Alejandro Santana
Independent Democratic Union	13: Jorge Alessandri Vergara; Pedro Pablo Álvarez-Salamanca; Nora Cuevas; Juan Fuenzalida; Sergio Gahona; Cristián Labbé Martínez; Joaquín Lavín; Javier Macaya; Juan Manuel Masferrer; Nicolás Noman; Gustavo Sanhueza; Renzo Trisotti; Osvaldo Urrutia	11: Nino Baltolu; Ramón Barros; Sergio Bobadilla; Juan Antonio Coloma Álamos; Javier Hernández; Cristhian Moreira; Iván Norambuena; Guillermo Ramírez; Rolando Rentería; Enrique van Rysselberghe Herrera; Gastón von Mühlenbrock	1: María José Hoffmann	1: Celso Morales
Socialist Party	16: Jenny Álvarez; Juan Luis Castro; Daniella Cicardini; Maya Fernández; Marcos Ilabaca; Raúl Leiva; Manuel Monsalve; Jaime Naranjo; Emilia Nuyado; Luis Rocafull; Gastón Saavedra; Raúl Saldívar; Juan Santana; Marcelo Schilling; Leonardo Soto; Jaime Tohá	–	–	1: Fidel Espinoza
Christian Democratic Party	7: Gabriel Ascencio; Iván Flores; José Miguel Ortiz; Gabriel Silber; Víctor Torres; Daniel Verdessi; Matías Walker	1: Jorge Sabag	–	4: Miguel Ángel Calisto; Manuel Matta Aragay; Joanna Pérez; Mario Venegas
Communist Party	8: Boris Barrera; Karol Cariola; Carmen Hertz; Amaro Labra; Rubén Moraga; Marisela Santibáñez; Guillermo Teillier; Camila Vallejo	–	–	1: Daniel Núñez
Party for Democracy	7: Ricardo Celis; Cristina Girardi; Rodrigo González Torres; Tucapel Jiménez; Carolina Marzán; Andrea Parra; Patricia Rubio	–	–	–
Democratic Revolution	5: Jorge Brito; Miguel Crispi; Giorgio Jackson; Catalina Pérez Salinas; Marcela Sandoval	–	–	1: Maite Orsini
Evópoli	5: Luciano Cruz-Coke; Pablo Kast; Sebastián Keitel; Andrés Molina; Francisco Undurraga	–	–	1: Sebastián Álvarez
Radical Party	2: Cosme Mellado; Alexis Sepúlveda	–	–	2: Marcela Hernando; José Pérez
Social Convergence	4: Gabriel Boric; Diego Ibáñez; Gonzalo Winter; Gael Yeomans	–	–	–
Social Green Regionalist Federation	1: Alejandra Sepúlveda	–	–	2: Jaime Mulet; Esteban Velásquez
Commons	1: Camila Rojas	–	–	1: Claudia Mix
Liberal Party	2: Alejandro Bernales; Vlado Mirosevic	–	–	–
Republican Party	–	2: Ignacio Urrutia; Cristóbal Urruticoechea	–	–
Green Ecologist Party	1: Félix González Gatica	–	–	–
Humanist Party	1: Pamela Jiles	–	–	–
Independent	16: Florcita Alarcón; Pepe Auth; Karim Bianchi; Álvaro Carter; Natalia Castillo; Marcelo Díaz; Tomás Hirsch; Carlos Abel Jarpa; Pablo Lorenzini; Érika Olivera; Pablo Prieto; Patricio Rosas; René Saffirio; Raúl Soto; Virginia Troncoso; Pablo Vidal	–	–	4: René Alinco; Sandra Amar; Fernando Meza; Pedro Velásquez
Total	101	30	2	22
Total	65.2%	19.4%	1.3%	14.2%

As the bill had been modified in the Chamber of Deputies, the Senate Constitution Committee decided to send it to a joint congressional committee. On 6 December, the committee voted 7–2 in favor of the Chamber's version of the legislation, with some modifications, including a compromise provision that spouses of transgender people wishing to change their name and legal gender should first be consulted as to whether they wish to divorce, which was criticized by MOVILH as "transphobic". The joint committee's bill was passed by both houses on 7 December 2021, with the Senate voting 21–8 with 3 abstentions and the Chamber voting 82–20 with 2 abstentions. The bill was signed by Piñera on 9 December. It was published in the Diario Oficial de la República de Chile on 10 December, and took effect 90 days later (i.e. 10 March 2022). The first same-sex marriage in Chile was performed in Santiago on 10 March between Javier Silva and Jaime Nazar. Article 102 of the Civil Code was amended to read: Marriage is a solemn, indissoluble contract by which two persons are united for life, in order to live together, to procreate, and to help each other. (Note: Spanish: El matrimonio es un contrato solemne por el cual dos personas se unen actual e indisolublemente, y por toda la vida, con el fin de vivir juntos, de procrear, y de auxiliarse mutuamente.)

7 December 2021 vote in the Senate
Party	Voted for	Voted against	Abstained	Absent (Did not vote)
Independent Democratic Union	–	3: Juan Antonio Coloma Correa; José Durana; Luz Ebensperger	3: Claudio Alvarado; Alejandro García-Huidobro; David Sandoval	3: Iván Moreira; Jacqueline van Rysselberghe; Ena von Baer
National Renewal	2: Rodrigo Galilea; Rafael Prohens	4: Juan Castro Prieto; Francisco Chahuán; José García Ruminot; Manuel José Ossandón	–	1: Marcela Sabat
Socialist Party	5: Isabel Allende; Alfonso de Urresti; Álvaro Elizalde; José Miguel Insulza; Carlos Montes Cisternas	–	–	2: Juan Pablo Letelier; Rabindranath Quinteros
Party for Democracy	4: Loreto Carvajal; Guido Girardi; Adriana Muñoz D'Albora; Jaime Quintana	–	–	2: Ricardo Lagos Weber; Jorge Soria
Christian Democratic Party	4: Francisco Huenchumilla; Jorge Pizarro; Yasna Provoste; Ximena Rincón	–	–	1: Carolina Goic
Democratic Revolution	1: Juan Ignacio Latorre	–	–	–
Evópoli	1: Felipe Kast	–	–	–
Progressive Party	–	–	–	1: Alejandro Navarro
Independent	4: Pedro Araya Guerrero; Carlos Bianchi Chelech; Alejandro Guillier; Ximena Órdenes	1: Carmen Gloria Aravena	–	1: Kenneth Pugh Olavarría
Total	21	8	3	11
Total	48.8%	18.6%	7.0%	25.6%

7 December 2021 vote in the Chamber of Deputies
Party	Voted for	Voted against	Abstained	Absent (Did not vote)
National Renewal	11: Andrés Celis Montt; Tomás Fuentes; Gonzalo Fuenzalida; Ramón Galleguillos; Andrés Longton; Karin Luck; Camilo Morán; Paulina Núñez; Jorge Rathgeb; Hugo Rey; Sebastián Torrealba	7: Francisco Eguiguren Correa; Carlos Kuschel; Miguel Mellado; Francesca Muñoz; Luis Pardo Sainz; Leopoldo Pérez; Frank Sauerbaum	–	13: José Miguel Castro; Sofía Cid; Catalina Del Real; Jorge Durán; Eduardo Durán; Camila Flores; René Manuel García; Aracely Leuquén Uribe; Ximena Ossandón; Diego Paulsen; Leonidas Romero; Alejandro Santana; Diego Schalper
Independent Democratic Union	8: Jorge Alessandri Vergara; Nora Cuevas; Sergio Gahona; Cristián Labbé Martínez; Juan Manuel Masferrer; Nicolás Noman; Gustavo Sanhueza; Osvaldo Urrutia	8: Nino Baltolu; Juan Antonio Coloma Álamos; Javier Hernández; Cristhian Moreira; Iván Norambuena; Guillermo Ramírez; Renzo Trisotti; Gastón von Mühlenbrock	2: María José Hoffmann; Celso Morales	8: Pedro Pablo Álvarez-Salamanca; Ramón Barros; Sergio Bobadilla; Juan Fuenzalida; Joaquín Lavín; Javier Macaya; Rolando Rentería; Enrique van Rysselberghe Herrera
Socialist Party	15: Jenny Álvarez; Daniella Cicardini; Maya Fernández; Marcos Ilabaca; Raúl Leiva; Manuel Monsalve; Jaime Naranjo; Emilia Nuyado; Luis Rocafull; Gastón Saavedra; Raúl Saldívar; Juan Santana; Marcelo Schilling; Leonardo Soto; Jaime Tohá	–	–	2: Juan Luis Castro; Fidel Espinoza
Christian Democratic Party	7: Gabriel Ascencio; Iván Flores; José Miguel Ortiz; Gabriel Silber; Víctor Torres; Daniel Verdessi; Matías Walker	1: Jorge Sabag	–	4: Miguel Ángel Calisto; Manuel Matta Aragay; Joanna Pérez; Mario Venegas
Communist Party	7: Boris Barrera; Karol Cariola; Amaro Labra; Rubén Moraga; Daniel Núñez; Guillermo Teillier; Camila Vallejo	–	–	2: Carmen Hertz; Marisela Santibáñez
Party for Democracy	4: Ricardo Celis; Cristina Girardi; Tucapel Jiménez; Patricia Rubio	–	–	3: Rodrigo González Torres; Carolina Marzán; Andrea Parra
Democratic Revolution	5: Jorge Brito; Miguel Crispi; Maite Orsini; Catalina Pérez Salinas; Marcela Sandoval	–	–	1: Giorgio Jackson
Evópoli	3: Luciano Cruz-Coke; Sebastián Keitel; Francisco Undurraga	–	–	3: Sebastián Álvarez; Pablo Kast; Andrés Molina
Radical Party	2: Marcela Hernando; Alexis Sepúlveda	1: José Pérez	–	1: Cosme Mellado
Social Convergence	3: Diego Ibáñez; Gonzalo Winter; Gael Yeomans	–	–	1: Gabriel Boric
Social Green Regionalist Federation	1: Jaime Mulet	–	–	2: Alejandra Sepúlveda; Esteban Velásquez
Commons	2: Claudia Mix; Camila Rojas	–	–	–
Liberal Party	1: Alejandro Bernales	–	–	1: Vlado Mirosevic
Republican Party	–	2: Ignacio Urrutia; Cristóbal Urruticoechea	–	–
Green Ecologist Party	1: Félix González Gatica	–	–	–
Humanist Party	1: Pamela Jiles	–	–	–
Independent	11: Florcita Alarcón; Bernardo Berger; Pepe Auth; Natalia Castillo; Marcelo Díaz; Tomás Hirsch; Carlos Abel Jarpa; Pablo Lorenzini; Fernando Meza; Patricio Rosas; Pablo Vidal	1: Harry Jürgensen	–	10: René Alinco; Sandra Amar; Karim Bianchi; Álvaro Carter; Érika Olivera; Pablo Prieto; René Saffirio; Raúl Soto; Virginia Troncoso; Pedro Velásquez
Total	82	20	2	51
Total	52.9%	12.9%	1.3%	32.9%

=== Attempts to modify constitution ===
In response to proposed legislation to recognize same-sex unions and potential legal battles brewing in the Constitutional Court, members of the Independent Democrat Union (UDI) introduced a constitutional amendment on 11 August 2011 seeking to define marriage as the "union of a man and a woman". The amendment was not brought to a vote. On 16 June 2016, two UDI MPs introduced a measure to constitutionally ban same-sex marriage and prohibit same-sex couples from adopting. The measure was not successful.

In October 2020, Chile voted in a national plebiscite to rewrite its constitution, and in a May 2021 election voters elected the members of the Constitutional Convention, the body tasked with writing the new constitution. Activists were hopeful that same-sex marriage and adoption rights for same-sex couples would be enshrined in this new constitution, particularly as the right-wing governing coalition, Chile Vamos, had failed to reach the third of members needed to veto amendments. The proposed constitution, which eventually did not address same-sex marriage explicitly, was rejected in a referendum in September 2022. Article 10 of the draft constitution read: "The State recognizes and protects families in their various forms, expressions and ways of life, without restricting them to exclusively filitive or consanguineous ties, and guarantees them a dignified life." Article 1 of the Constitution of Chile (Spanish: Constitución Política de la República de Chile; Mapudungun: Anültu Zugu Chile Mapu; Quechua: Chiliq Kuraq Kamachiynin; Aymara: Chili Istaru Tayka Kamachi; Rapa Nui: Tāpa'o Hōhonu o te Henua Tire) currently states:

Family is the fundamental core of society. (Note: Spanish: La familia es el núcleo fundamental de la sociedad.)

=== Statistics ===
In the first month following the entry into force of the marriage law, 170 same-sex couples had married in Chile, of which 101 were lesbian couples. By February 2023, 2,254 same-sex marriages had been performed in Chile; 1,227 between two women and 1,027 between two men. Reports estimated that this had increased to 5,049 marriages by June 2024, and to 6,281 marriages by December 2024, mostly in the Santiago Metropolitan Region.

=== Religious performance ===
The Catholic Church opposes same-sex marriage and does not allow its priests to officiate at such marriages. In March 2004, the Archbishop of Santiago, Francisco Javier Errázuriz Ossa, expressed opposition to same-sex marriage but called for regulating same-sex unions "in some way"; "One can understand that homosexuals can form stable relationships, that they want to have a community property, but that is not marriage. It must be given another name." The Church campaigned heavily against legalization, issuing a statement in June 2021 that "those of us who follow Jesus Christ as Savior and Lord and are guided by His teachings, maintain the certainty that marriage established and willed by God is only between a man and a woman". In September 2021, Archbishop Celestino Aós Braco praised those who "seek to respect and protect [...] the family founded on marriage between a man and a woman." Government spokespeople replied to church criticism, asserting that Chile was a secular state and that the "law has to protect all families". MOVILH accused the Church of using same-sex couples as "scapegoats" to deflect from its "illegal acts ranging from the abuse of minors to economic corruption". In December 2023, the Holy See published Fiducia supplicans, a declaration allowing Catholic priests to bless couples who are not considered to be married according to church teaching, including the blessing of same-sex couples.

In 2011, the Evangelical Lutheran Church in Chile expressed its support for same-sex civil unions. The Church defines marriage as "a union of two people in love based on mutual trust and fidelity" without making distinction as to the sex of the contracting parties. Clergy are free to decide whether to perform blessings for same-sex couples. The Lutheran Church in Chile similarly defines marriages as "a union of two people in love" and offers blessings to couples. Some Jewish groups also bless same-sex unions. On 25 February 2023, a same-sex marriage was held according to the rites of the Mapuche religion. The couple, Viviana Burgos Valenzuela and Rosa Salamanca Conalef, had held a civil marriage two days earlier in the town of Villa Almagro in Nueva Imperial. The religious ceremony was officiated by a Mapuche spiritual leader (machi) in a native forest.

== Public opinion ==
An April 2009 poll concluded that only 33% of Chileans were in favor of allowing same-sex couples to marry, with 65% opposed. However, support among young people was much higher: according to a study by the National Youth Institute (Instituto Nacional de la Juventud), 56% of people aged between 15 and 29 supported same-sex marriage, while 51% supported adoption by same-sex couples. A July 2011 CEP (Centro de Estudios Públicos) poll found that 52% of Chileans were in favor of granting legal rights to same-sex unions: 18% supported civil marriage, while 34% preferred giving same-sex couples a "legal union". When the question was slightly rephrased, 57% of Chileans were against same-sex marriage with "the same rights as a heterosexual couple" and 27% in favor, while support for a "legal union" was higher at 35%, with 57% opposed. In all questions, support for same-sex unions was higher among the younger and better educated. With regard to adoption of children by lesbian couples, 24% were in favor and 61% against. Support was lower for adoption by male couples: 20% in favor and 64% opposed.

An August 2012 poll by Radio Cooperativa and Imaginaccion Consultores found that 55% of Chileans supported same-sex marriage, while 41% were opposed. A Pew Research Center survey conducted the following year showed that 46% of Chileans supported same-sex marriage, while 42% were opposed. According to a 2014 survey by the Chilean pollster Cadem (Cadem Plaza Pública), 55% of Chileans were in favor of same-sex marriage, whilst 39% were against. A poll carried out in September 2015 by the same polling organization found that 60% of Chileans supported same-sex marriage, whereas opposition was 36%. The organization's annual 2016 survey found 61% support and 36% opposition. A further poll carried out in July 2017 showed that support stood at 61% and opposition at 32%.

A 2016 International Civic and Citizenship Education Study (Estudio Internacional de Educación Cívica y Ciudadana) poll, published in April 2018, found that 79% of Chilean eighth graders (13–14-year-olds) supported same-sex marriage. The study showed that Chile had the highest support among the five Latin American polled; support in Mexico was at 78%, Colombia at 63%, Peru at 48%, and the Dominican Republic at 38%. Chile's support was a 21% increase from 2009.

The 2017 AmericasBarometer showed that 59% of Chileans supported same-sex marriage. A Radio Cooperative poll conducted between 24 and 27 August 2017 found that 62% of Chileans supported same-sex marriage, while 35% were against. In the same poll, 47% supported adoption by same-sex couples, while 51% were opposed. A Cadem poll carried out in April 2018 placed support for same-sex marriage at 64% and opposition at 34%, while 2% were unsure or had refused to answer. Support and opposition to adoption rights both stood at 49%. In 2019, the organization showed that support for same-sex marriage had increased to 66%, with 54% also in favor of permitting same-sex couples to adopt. In 2022, support for same-sex marriage reached 82% and support for adoption rights reached 70%.

== See also ==
- LGBT rights in Chile
- Recognition of same-sex unions in the Americas
- Same-sex union court cases
- Polygamy in Mapuche culture
