= Rabindranath Quinteros =

Chilean politician

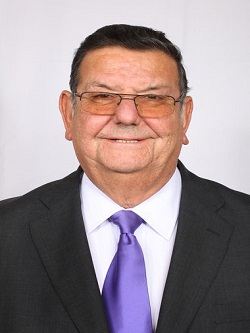
- Official portrait (2014)

Member of the Senate of Chile
- In office 11 March 2014 – 11 March 2022
- Preceded by: Camilo Escalona
- Succeeded by: Dissolution of the Circumscription
- Constituency: 17th Circumscription

Mayor of Puerto Montt
- In office 6 December 2000 – 15 November 2012
- Preceded by: Raúl Blanco
- Succeeded by: Eduardo Matamala

Intendant of Los Lagos Region
- In office 11 March 1990 – 11 March 2000
- President: Patricio Aylwin (1990–1994); Eduardo Frei Ruíz-Tagle (1994–2000)
- Preceded by: Creation of the position
- Succeeded by: Iván Navarro

Personal details
- Born: 31 October 1943 (age 82) Taltal, Chile
- Party: Socialist Party
- Spouse: María Angélica López
- Children: Four
- Parent(s): Victoriano Quinteros; Graciela Lara
- Education: University of Chile
- Occupation: Politician
- Profession: Odontologist

Rabindranath Vladimir Quinteros Lara (born 31 October 1943) is a Chilean politician who currently serves as a member of the Senate of his country.

== Early life and family ==
He was born in Taltal on 31 October 1943. He is the son of Victoriano Quinteros and Graciela Lara Rodríguez.

He is married to María Angélica López and is the father of four daughters.

== Professional career ==
He completed his primary education at the Escuela Hogar Victoriano Quinteros in Taltal. During sixth grade of preparatory school, he moved to the Internado de Ovalle. He later pursued higher education at the University of Chile, where he qualified as a dentist in 1969.

After graduating, he worked at the Health Service of the city of Curicó until 1973.

During the 1980s, he practiced his profession in Osorno.

== Political career ==
While attending secondary school, he was a leader of the Federation of Secondary, Industrial, and Agricultural Students of Ovalle (FESIAO).

During his university years, he joined the Socialist Party of Chile (PS) and served as a delegate of the Faculty of Dentistry, as well as a member of the leadership of the Federation of Students of the University of Chile (FECh).

Following the military coup of 11 September 1973, he was detained in Curicó and later imprisoned and internally exiled in December of that year to San Pablo in the Los Lagos Region, where he lived until 1977. He subsequently moved to Osorno and later to Puerto Montt.

In the December 1989 parliamentary elections, he ran as an independent candidate for the Chamber of Deputies of Chile representing Osorno, but was not elected.

In March 1990, President Patricio Aylwin appointed him Intendant of the Los Lagos Region. In 1994, President Eduardo Frei Ruiz-Tagle confirmed him in the position, which he held until March 2000.

In the 2000 municipal elections, he was elected Mayor of Puerto Montt, obtaining 23,128 votes (39.15% of the valid votes). He was re-elected in the 2004 elections with 39,748 votes (69.11%) and again in the 2008 elections with 38,724 votes (63.51%).

In June 2007, he assumed the presidency of the Chilean Association of Municipalities, a position he held until June 2008.

In the 2013 parliamentary elections, he ran for the Senate of Chile representing the Los Lagos Region and was elected with the highest vote share, obtaining 135,372 votes, corresponding to 47.50% of the valid votes cast.

In the 21 November 2021 parliamentary elections, he ran as a candidate for the 13th Senatorial District (Los Lagos Region), but was not elected. He obtained 32,428 votes, equivalent to 10.95% of the valid votes.

Quinteros served as President of the Council on Parliamentary Allowances. He was a candidate for Mayor of Puerto Montt in the 26–27 October 2024 municipal elections, supported by the Socialist Party of Chile within the Contigo Chile Mejor list, but was not elected.
