= Marcela Sabat =

Chilean politician

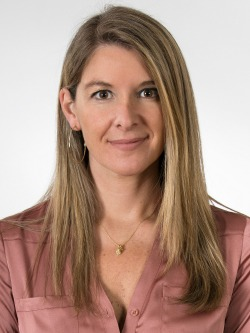
- Official portrait (2018)

Member of the Senate of Chile
- In office 4 August 2020 – 11 March 2022
- Preceded by: Andrés Allamand
- Succeeded by: District dissolved
- Constituency: 7th Circunscription (Santiago Poniente)

Member of the Chamber of Deputies
- In office 11 March 2018 – 4 August 2020
- Preceded by: District created
- Succeeded by: Tomás Fuentes
- Constituency: District 10
- In office 11 March 2010 – 11 March 2018
- Preceded by: Marcela Cubillos
- Succeeded by: District dissolved
- Constituency: 21st District (Ñuñoa and Providencia)

Personal details
- Born: 4 April 1981 (age 45) Santiago, Chile
- Party: Renovación Nacional
- Spouse: Rodrigo Sarquis
- Children: Two
- Parent(s): Pedro Sabat; Marcela Fernández
- Education: University for Development (LLB); Finis Terrae University (MA); Adolfo Ibáñez University (Ph.D.)
- Occupation: Politician
- Profession: Lawyer

Marcela Constanza Sabat Fernández (born 4 April 1981) is a Chilean lawyer and politician who served as a Senator.

== Early life and family ==
Sabat was born in Santiago, Chile, on 4 April 1981. She is the daughter of Pedro Sabat, Mayor of Ñuñoa between 1996 and 2015, and Erika Marcela Fernández Silva.

She is married to Rodrigo Sarquis Martini and is the mother of one daughter and one son.

== Professional career ==
She completed her primary and secondary education at Trewhela’s School, graduating in 1998. She studied Law at the University for Development (UDD) and at Finis Terrae University.

She also pursued studies in theater, vocal creativity, and body expression at the Arte Abam Academy. In addition, she obtained a postgraduate diploma in Marketing and Sales from the Adolfo Ibáñez University.

In professional terms, between 1999 and 2007 she worked at the Otero Law Firm, where she served as an assistant to lawyer and former senator for Santiago West, Miguel Otero.

In 2008, she worked as a public relations and marketing assistant at Audi Chile.

== Political career ==
She is a member of National Renewal (RN) and has collaborated in the electoral campaigns of her father, who was elected municipal councillor for Ñuñoa in 1992 and later mayor of the same municipality in the elections of 1996, 2000, 2004, 2008, and 2012.

In 1994, she participated in the parliamentary campaign of then deputy Alberto Espina. During the 1999 presidential election, she supported candidate Joaquín Lavín.

In 2005 and 2009, she worked on the presidential campaigns of former senator Sebastián Piñera. She served as a spokesperson for Piñera during the second round of the January 2010 presidential election.

In the November 2017 parliamentary elections, she was re-elected as a member of the Chamber of Deputies representing National Renewal within the Chile Vamos coalition for the new 10th District of the Santiago Metropolitan Region. She obtained 54,630 votes, equivalent to 12.52% of the valid votes cast.

In 2018, she participated in the Working Group of the National Agreement for Children.

In the internal elections of National Renewal held on 17 November 2018, she was elected to the party’s national board as vice president. She also served as president of RN Women.

In the November 2021 parliamentary elections, she ran for the Senate of Chile representing National Renewal within the Chile Podemos Más coalition for the 7th Senatorial Circumscription (Santiago Metropolitan Region). She obtained 109,239 votes, corresponding to 4.11% of the valid votes, and was not elected.
