= Alejandra Sepúlveda =

Chilean politician

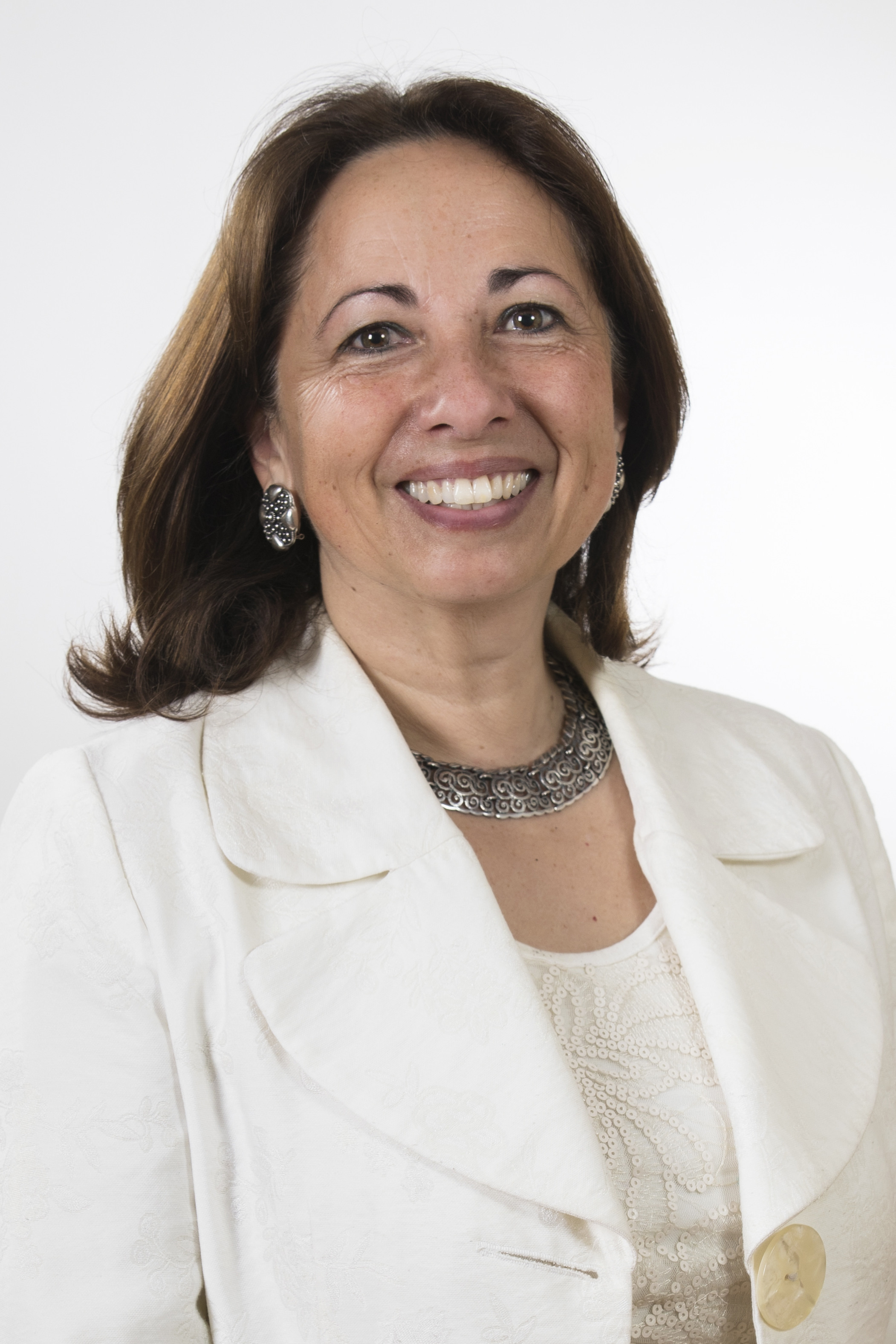

Member of the Senate
- Incumbent
- Assumed office 11 March 2022
- Constituency: 8th Circumscription

President of the Chamber of Deputies
- In office 11 March 2010 – 15 March 2011
- Preceded by: Rodrigo Álvarez
- Succeeded by: Patricio Melero

Member of the Chamber of Deputies
- In office 11 March 2002 – 11 March 2022
- Succeeded by: Juan Ramón Núñez
- Constituency: 34th District; 16th District

Personal details
- Born: 13 November 1965 (age 61) Viña del Mar, Chile
- Party: Social Green Regionalist Federation
- Education: Austral University of Chile
- Occupation: Politician
- Profession: Veterinarian

Alejandra Amalia Sepúlveda Orbenes (born 13 November 1965) is a politician currently serving as a parliamentary.

She began his parliamentary career as a member of the Chamber of Deputies of Chile, representing the O'Higgins Region. Similarly, Sepúlveda served as President of the Chamber of Deputies, after being elected.

== Early life and education ==
Sepúlveda was born on 13 November 1965 in Viña del Mar. She is the daughter of Guillermo Cayetano Sepúlveda Diez and Amalia Albina Orbenes Miranda. She is divorced and the mother of three children.

She completed her secondary education at Colegio Sagrados Corazones of Valparaíso, graduating in 1982. She later pursued higher education in Valdivia at the Faculty of Agricultural Sciences of the Universidad Austral de Chile, where she obtained a degree in Veterinary Medicine and completed postgraduate studies in Rural Development, graduating from a Master's program in that field.

== Professional career ==
In 1991, Sepúlveda participated in a Canadian-funded project on organic contaminants and industrial waste, developed jointly with the Faculty of Veterinary Medicine of the Universidad Austral de Chile. The following year, she worked in the Industrial Contaminants Analysis Service for Food at the university's Institute of Preventive Medicine.

She subsequently joined the Instituto de Desarrollo Agropecuario (INDAP) as an account executive at the Paillaco Agency in the Los Lagos Region. In 1993, she was appointed head of the Paillaco INDAP Agency. In 1996, she played a key role in the creation of the first Business Management Center for Small-Scale Chilean Agriculture, acting as INDAP's institutional counterpart to the Universidad de Chile.

In 1999, she assumed office as Regional Director of INDAP in the O'Higgins Region. That same year, she carried out an international consultancy in El Salvador, focused on the creation of an investment fund for small-scale agriculture in Central America.

== Political career ==
Since the 1990s, Sepúlveda was a member of the Christian Democratic Party, where she rose to the position of second vice-president. She resigned from the party on 8 January 2008 and joined the Independent Regionalist Party (PRI). In 2012, she left the PRI and continued her political activity as an independent.

In July 2015, she participated in the founding of the Movement for Independent Regionalist Agrarian and Social Action (MIRAS), serving as its first president until 2017. Two years later, she was a co-founder of the Social Green Regionalist Federation.

In August 2021, Sepúlveda registered her candidacy for the Senate of Chile representing the FRVS within the Apruebo Dignidad electoral pact, for the 8th senatorial constituency of the O'Higgins Region, for the 2022–2030 term. In the November 2021 elections, she was elected senator with 120,355 votes, corresponding to 35.56% of the valid votes cast.

At the end of March 2023, she announced her resignation from the FRVS.
