= Gastón Saavedra =

Chilean politician

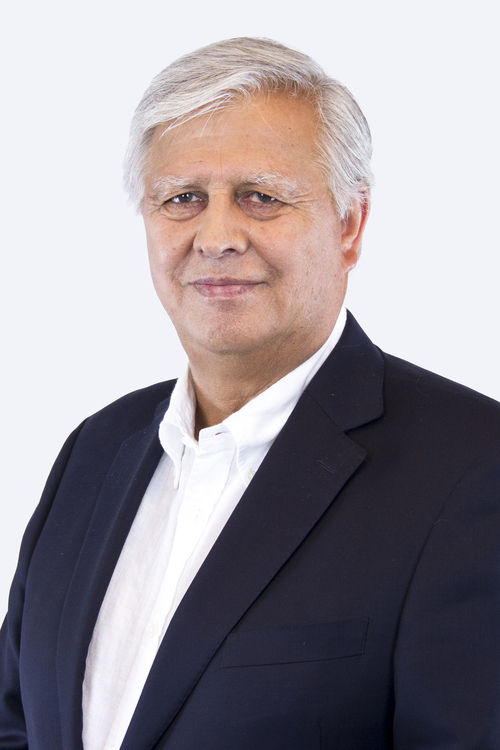

Member of the Senate
- Incumbent
- Assumed office 11 March 2022
- Constituency: 10th Circumscription (Bío Bío Region)

Member of the Chamber of Deputies
- In office 11 March 2018 – 11 March 2022
- Preceded by: Creation of the district
- Constituency: District 20

Mayor of Talcahuano
- In office 6 December 2008 – 6 December 2016
- Preceded by: Abel Contreras
- Succeeded by: Henry Campos

Councilman of Talcahuano
- In office 6 December 1996 – 6 December 2008

Personal details
- Born: 22 November 1955 (age 70) Talcahuano, Chile
- Party: Socialist Party
- Education: Federico Santa María Technical University (B.Sc)
- Occupation: Politician
- Profession: Engineer

Gastón Saavedra Chandía (born 22 November 1955) is a Chilean politician who is currently serving as senator.

== Early life and education ==
Gastón René Saavedra Chandía was born in Talcahuano on 22 November 1955. He is the son of Sergio Saavedra, a former steel industry worker, and Jeorjina Chandía. He is married to Patricia Bachmann Millaleo and is the father of three children: Eduardo, Gabriela, and Mariela.

He completed his primary education at School No. 23 in the Esmeralda neighborhood of Talcahuano and his secondary education at the Liceo Industrial A-23 Juan Antonio Ríos in the same city, graduating in 1973. Between 1978 and 1982, he studied at the Universidad Técnica Federico Santa María, where he earned a university technical degree in Maintenance Mechanics. He later continued his higher education at the Universidad del Mar in Concepción, obtaining a degree in Transport and Port Operations Engineering in 2006.

== Professional career ==
From the early 1990s until 2009, Saavedra worked at the Empresa Portuaria de Chile, where he also served as president of the Unified Port Workers’ Union of San Vicente–Talcahuano. During this period, he combined his professional activity in the port sector with extensive trade union leadership at both the local and national levels.

== Political career ==
Saavedra has been a social leader since a young age and an opponent of the military dictatorship. In 1983, for political reasons, he left the country and remained abroad until late 1984. Upon his return to Chile, he faced difficulties in labor reintegration and began working as an advisor in the maritime and port sector in Talcahuano. He participated in the founding of several trade union organizations, including the Confederation of Seafarers (Congemar), the Port and Maritime Federation of Chile (Fepomach), the Regional Federation of Fishing Unions of the Biobío Region, the Forestry Workers’ Federation (CTF), the Arauco branch of the Central Unitaria de Trabajadores, the national CUT, and the Chilean Fisheries Confederation.

In 1989, he served as president of the Regional United Left and, in 1990, became a member of the Central Committee of the Socialist Unity process, as well as part of the regional leadership of the Socialist Party of Chile. He also joined the party’s local leadership in Talcahuano and was head of its trade union department.

Between 1990 and 2002, Saavedra was president of the Unified Port Workers’ Union of San Vicente–Talcahuano and served simultaneously as provincial vice-president of the CUT in Concepción. He was appointed by presidential decree to the Regional Council for Poverty Alleviation for the 1992–1994 period and later served on the Regional Environmental Advisory Council (COREMA) between 1993 and 1997.

From 1994 to 2002, he was a national leader of the National Federation of Port Workers of Chile (Fenatraporchi). In the early 2000s, he continued to hold senior trade union roles, including serving as workers’ representative on the board of the Talcahuano Port Company in 2004 and as vice-president of the National Federation of Port Workers in 2008.

In October 1996, Saavedra was elected municipal councillor for Talcahuano with 5,524 votes (5.37%). He was re-elected in the 2000 municipal elections with 14,534 votes (17.64%) and again in 2004 with 10,423 votes (17.90%).

In 2008, he was elected mayor of Talcahuano with 27,886 votes (39.56%) and secured re-election in the 2012 municipal elections with 36,174 votes, representing 71.64% of the total vote.

In the November 2017 parliamentary elections, Saavedra was elected to the Chamber of Deputies of Chile representing the Socialist Party of Chile within the “La Fuerza de la Mayoría” electoral pact, for the 20th electoral district of the Biobío Region, obtaining 30,557 votes (9.06%).

In August 2021, he registered his candidacy for the Senate of Chile representing the Socialist Party of Chile within the New Social Pact coalition, for the 10th senatorial constituency of the Biobío Region. In the November elections, he was elected senator with 59,271 votes, corresponding to 10.79% of the valid votes cast.
