= Kenneth Pugh Olavarría =

Chilean politician

Kenneth Pugh
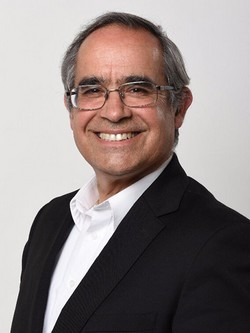

Member of the Senate
- In office 11 March 2018 – 11 March 2026
- Constituency: 6th Circunscription (Valparaíso Region)

Personal details
- Born: 22 October 1959 (age 66) Valparaíso, Chile
- Spouse: María Valdovinos
- Children: Four
- Education: Arturo Prat Naval Academy (Grade); Pontifical Catholic University of Valparaíso (M.D.)
- Profession: Marine

Kenneth Peter Pugh Olavarría (Valparaíso, 22 October 1959) is a retired vice admiral of the Chilean Navy, a naval engineer, and a Chilean politician. He has served as a Senator of the Republic for the Valparaíso Region during the 2018–2026 legislative period. His public service has been characterized by specialization in defense matters, cybersecurity and the digital transformation of the State.

He developed a 35-year career in the Chilean Navy, reaching the rank of vice admiral in 2012 and serving in senior command, intelligence, personnel, social welfare, and naval health positions, as well as in diplomatic and strategic postings both in Chile and abroad. He commanded surface units, served as Director of the Naval Hospital of Viña del Mar, and as Commander-in-Chief of naval zones, retiring in 2014.

As a senator, he was one of the main promoters in advancing initiatives such as the Cybersecurity Framework Law, the Personal Data Protection Law, the State Digital Transformation Law, and the modernization of legislation on computer crimes.

He also chaired standing Senate committees, promoted international cooperation initiatives in technological matters, and has been a speaker and international reference in public policies related to cyberspace and digital sovereignty.

== Biography ==
He is the son of Kenneth Pugh Gillmore, a Chilean of British descent, and María Teresa Olavarría Sanhueza. He is married to María Victoria Valdovinos Izue and is the father of four children: Kenneth, Duncan, Stephen, and María Victoria.

He studied at The Mackay School in Viña del Mar and later entered the Arturo Prat Naval Academy, graduating as an ensign on 1 January 1979. He is a Naval Weapons Engineer with a specialization in Electronics, and holds a Master of Science in Naval and Maritime Sciences with a specialization in Strategy from the Pontifical Catholic University of Valparaíso.

He has also completed a Diploma in Finance at the Pontifical Catholic University of Valparaíso and a Diploma in Health Institution Management at Andrés Bello University.

== Naval career ==
=== Early career ===
During his 35-year career in the Chilean Navy, he served aboard the destroyers Almirante Latorre and Almirante Cochrane, the frigate Condell, the training ship Esmeralda, and the missile boat Chipana. He later commanded the missile boat Papudo (1997), the anti-submarine frigate Ministro Zenteno (2002), and the fleet flagship, the destroyer Blanco Encalada (2003).

He held various leadership positions, including serving as Defense Attaché at the Embassy of Chile in Canada between 2004 and 2005, where he established the Defense Attaché office. In 2006, he was appointed Chief of Staff of the Fourth Naval Zone, serving until 2007 in the Tarapacá Region. He was later appointed Director of the Naval Hospital of Viña del Mar in 2008, becoming the first non-physician director of the institution.

Among his shore assignments were Project Manager of the "Olimpo" Program, Head of the Analysis Section of the Navy Armaments Directorate, Head of ITO in Israel, Deputy Chief of the Navy Tactical Training Center, and Head of the SALINO System Implementation Group.

=== High command ===
On 15 December 2008, he assumed office as Director of Social Welfare of the Navy. On 30 December of the same year, he was promoted to the rank of commodore.

On 18 June 2009, President Michelle Bachelet conferred upon him the rank of rear admiral, and he simultaneously assumed the position of Commander-in-Chief of the Fourth Naval Zone. The following year, he became Director of Naval Intelligence until 2 December 2011, when he assumed as Commander-in-Chief of the First Naval Zone, Commander General of the Naval Garrison, and Naval Judge of Valparaíso.

The following year, he again assumed as Director of Naval Intelligence. In January 2012, President Sebastián Piñera promoted him to the rank of vice admiral. That same year, he became Director General of Navy Personnel. He concluded his duties at the end of 2013 and retired in 2014.

== Political career ==
He ran as a candidate for Senator for the Valparaíso Region in the 2017 parliamentary elections, registering as an independent candidate with the support of National Renewal, which made him a running mate of Francisco Chahuán.

Chahuán's strong vote total contributed to Pugh also securing a seat with more than 14,000 votes, in accordance with the D'Hondt method.

=== Parliamentary work: 2018–2026 ===
During his parliamentary term, he served on several standing committees of the Senate of Chile related to defense, maritime affairs, and technological development. His legislative work focused primarily on developing a comprehensive regulatory framework for cyberspace, strengthening areas such as digital sovereignty, national cybersecurity, personal data protection, and digital accessibility.

He participated in the Standing Committee on National Defense from March 2018, as well as the Committee on Maritime Interests, Fisheries and Aquaculture between March 2018 and March 2022. He was also a member of the Special Committee on Extreme Zones and Special Territories. From March 2022, he joined the Committee on Future Challenges, Science, Technology and Innovation, and chaired the Senate Committee on Ethics and Transparency beginning in April of that year.

Internationally, he spoke at multilateral forums related to legal and technological cooperation. On 7 November 2022, he participated in the Regional Forum of the Americas on Cooperation in Cybercrime and Electronic Evidence, held in San José, Costa Rica, where he addressed Chile's experience in legislation and institutional coordination in response to computer crimes and threats in cyberspace.

Among the main laws approved with his participation are the law establishing October as National Cybersecurity Month (Note: Ley N.º 21.113.), enacted in 2018; the State Digital Transformation Law (2019), which digitized administrative procedures; (Note: Ley N.º 21.180.) the Computer Crimes Law (Note: Ley N.º 21.459.), enacted in 2022 to align Chilean legislation with the Budapest Convention on Cybercrime; the Fintech Law (Note: Ley N.º 21.521.) of 2022; the Cybersecurity Framework Law, (Note: Ley N.º 21.663.) enacted in 2024, which created the National Cybersecurity Agency and established obligations for critical infrastructure; and the Personal Data Protection Law, also enacted in 2024, (Note: Ley N.º 21.719.) which modernized the privacy regime and created a specialized supervisory authority.

For the 2025 parliamentary elections, he ruled out seeking re-election for the Valparaíso Region.
