= Ximena Órdenes =

Chilean sociologist and politician

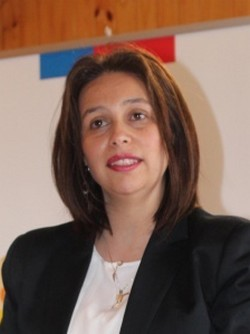
- Órdenes in November 2014

Member of the Senate of Chile
- Incumbent
- Assumed office 11 March 2018
- Preceded by: Constituency created
- Constituency: Constituency 14 (Aysén Region)

Intendant of Aysén Region
- In office 11 March 2014 – 13 July 2015
- President: Michelle Bachelet
- Preceded by: Pilar Cuevas Mardones
- Succeeded by: Jorge Calderón Nuñez

Regional Ministerial Secretary of Public Works of Aysén Region
- In office 11 November 2008 – 11 March 2010
- President: Michelle Bachelet

Governor of Aysén Province
- In office 11 March 2006 – 11 November 2008
- President: Michelle Bachelet
- Preceded by: José Urrutia Bustos
- Succeeded by: Isaac Arturo Ovando Bello

Personal details
- Born: Ximena Loreto Órdenes Neira; 9 March 1973 (age 53) Coyhaique, Chile
- Party: Party for Democracy
- Children: 1
- Education: Andrés Bello National University
- Occupation: Sociologist, politician

Ximena Loreto Órdenes Neira (born 9 March 1973) is a Chilean sociologist and politician. She is currently a senator for Constituency 14, corresponding to Aysén Region. She was intendant of Aysén Region from 2014 to 2015, under the second government of Michelle Bachelet.

In the first Bachelet government, she was governor of Aysén Province from 2006 to 2008, and regional ministerial secretary of public works from 2008 to 2010.

== Biography ==
Ximena Órdenes was born in Coyhaique on 9 March 1973, the daughter of Segismundo Órdenes González and Danira Neira Vera. Her grandfather, Daniel Neira, was the founder of the Socialist Party in Aysén Region and a councilor. Her parents were founders of the Party for Democracy (PPD) in Aysén, which she also joined. Her mother was president of the Aysén Human Rights Group.

Her early education took place at Liceo San Felipe Benicio in Coyhaique. She later studied sociology at the University of the Republic, Santiago. She completed a diploma in gender and development at Andrés Bello National University.

== Political career ==
Órdenes' formal career in public service began in 2003, when she was appointed by President Ricardo Lagos as regional director of the National Women's Service (SERNAM), a position she held until 2006. In March of that year, she was appointed governor of Aysén Province by President Michelle Bachelet. In November 2008, she became regional ministerial secretary for public works in Aysén Region, remaining in office until March 2010.

In 2013, she was elected regional councilor for Coyhaique, obtaining 1,583 votes, equivalent to 8.2% of the total. She never held the office, due to the fact that President Bachelet appointed her intendant of Aysén Region, effective 11 March 2014. During her term, she chaired the commission for the establishment of the University of Aysén and the implementation of the Special Plan for Extreme Zones in the region. In November 2016, she resigned her membership in the PPD, of which she had been national vice president.

After serving as head of the National Coordination Division of the Undersecretariat of Crime Prevention, Órdenes decided to present her candidacy for senator for Aysén in the 2017 general election, as an independent in the PPD quota. She was elected with 5,405 votes, equivalent to 15.1% of the total. For the second round of the election, she joined the command of the independent candidate Alejandro Guillier.

She took office as senator on 11 March 2018, becoming the first woman to hold the office representing Aysén Region. Since 21 March 2018, she has been a member of the permanent commissions of public works, the environment, and national assets.
