= Carlos Kuschel =

Chilean politician (born 1953)

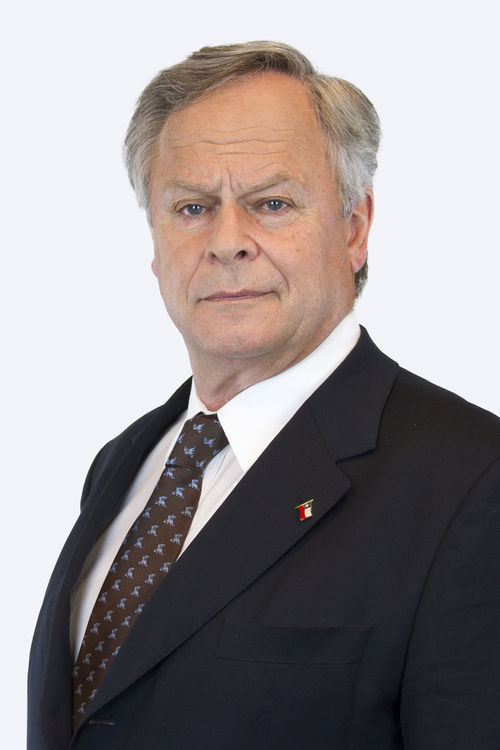

Member of the Senate of Chile
- Incumbent
- Assumed office 11 March 2022
- Constituency: 12th Circumscription (Los Lagos Region)

Member of the Chamber of Deputies
- In office 11 March 2018 – 11 March 2022
- Preceded by: Creation of the district
- In office 11 March 2010 – 11 March 2014
- Preceded by: Rodolfo Stange
- Succeeded by: Iván Moreira
- Constituency: 12th Circumscription (Los Lagos Region)
- In office 11 March 1990 – 11 March 2006
- Preceded by: Creation of the district
- Succeeded by: Marisol Turres
- Constituency: District 57

Mayor of Puerto Montt
- In office January 1989 – August 1989
- Appointed by: Augusto Pinochet
- Preceded by: Federico Oelckers
- Succeeded by: Martín Ercoreca

Personal details
- Born: 16 March 1953 (age 73) Frutillar, Chile
- Party: National Renewal
- Spouse: Delia Rietzsch
- Children: Four
- Parent(s): Ignacio Kuschel; María Silva
- Education: University of Chile (Degree)
- Occupation: Politician
- Profession: Economist

Carlos Ignacio Kuschel Silva (born 16 March 1953) is a Chilean commercial engineer and politician of the National Renewal party.

He has served as a Senator for the 13th Circumscription of the Los Lagos Region since 2022. Previously, he served as a member of the Chamber of Deputies and as Senator for the former 17th Circumscription, as well as mayor of Puerto Montt in 1989.

Kuschel is a co-founder of the Center for the Study of the Historical Heritage of the Llanquihue Province (Ceph). He also has been a columnist for the newspapers El Llanquihue, Estrategia and Estrella de Chiloé, and has occasionally written for El Austral de Osorno and El Austral de Valdivia.

== Early life ==
Kuschel was born on 16 March 1953 in Frutillar, Los Lagos Region. He is the son of Ignacio Kuschel Hitschfeld and María Rosa Silva Montt.

He is married to Delia Verónica Rietzsch Baader, with whom he has four daughters.

== Education and professional career ==
He completed his primary education at the German Institute of Frutillar and his secondary education at Colegio San Francisco Javier in Puerto Montt. He later entered the Faculty of Economic and Administrative Sciences of the University of Chile, where he obtained a bachelor's and licentiate degree in Economic Sciences and the professional title of Commercial Engineer.

He completed a diploma in International Trade at the Getulio Vargas Foundation —Fundação Getulio Vargas– in Rio de Janeiro, Brazil, and earned a Master’s degree in International Studies from the Institute of International Studies of the University of Chile. He also pursued finance studies at the Institute of New Economy in Hamburg, Germany, and completed specialization courses in Chile, Germany, Brazil, Venezuela and the United States.

He has worked as a lecturer in Financial Mathematics, Capital Markets and Macroeconomics at the Guillermo Subercaseaux Institute of Banking Studies in Santiago, at the University of Los Lagos (Osorno campus), and at the Austral University of Chile in Osorno and Puerto Montt.

Professionally, he developed activities related to commercialization, transportation and cultivation of marine and agricultural products, as well as tourism. He worked as sales manager of Televisión Nacional de Chile (TVN) from 1979 to 1980, and later served as general manager of the Agricultural and Livestock Society of Osorno until 1981.

He also worked as an executive at Chile’s Export Promotion Office in Hamburg and as a forestry sector specialist at ProChile. Since 1980, he has been based in the Province of Llanquihue.

Between 1982 and 1989, he served as head of the Project Office of the Municipality of Puerto Montt, where he led the development of the municipal development plan for the 1984–1989 period and served as director of the municipal education area.

In 2004, he received an award from the Chamber of Commerce of Brazil as “Outstanding Personality of 2003”.

== Political career ==
Kuschel began his political activities in 1973 as a youth member of the National Party, where he remained for several years. In 1987, he joined National Renewal (RN) and organized and presided over the party in the Los Lagos Region.

In January 1989, he was appointed mayor of Puerto Montt, serving until June of that year, when he resigned to compete in parliamentary elections. His administration prioritized education, health, sanitation, green areas and environmental policies, including the “Puerto Montt Verde y Limpio” campaign, which involved the planting of approximately sixty thousand trees across the commune.

He was elected four consecutive times as deputy for District No. 57 of the Los Lagos Region between 1990 and 2006. He later served as Senator for the 17th Circumscription of Los Lagos (2006–2014).

In the 2013 parliamentary elections, he ran unsuccessfully for re-election to the Senate. He subsequently served as Deputy for the 26th District of Los Lagos from 2018 to 2022.

In August 2021, he registered his candidacy for the Senate representing RN in the 13th Circumscription of the Los Lagos Region and was elected as part of the Chile Podemos Más coalition, obtaining 28,814 votes, equivalent to 9.73% of the valid votes cast.
