= Luz Ebensperger =

Chilean lawyer and politician

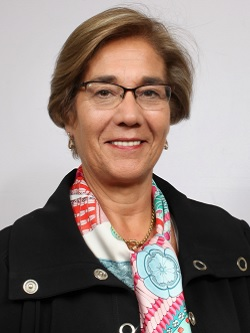

Member of the Senate of Chile
- In office 11 March 2018 – 11 March 2026
- Preceded by: Constituency created
- Constituency: Constituency 2 (Tarapacá Region)

Indendant of Tarapacá Region
- In office 11 March 2010 – 11 March 2014
- President: Sebastián Piñera
- Preceded by: Miguel Silva Rodríguez
- Succeeded by: Mitchel Cartes Tamayo

Personal details
- Born: Luz Eliana Ebensperger Orrego; 8 March 1964 (age 62) Puerto Montt, Chile
- Party: Independent Democratic Union
- Spouse: José Andrés Díaz Brito
- Children: 3
- Education: Pontifical Catholic University of Chile
- Occupation: Lawyer, politician

Luz Eliana Ebensperger Orrego (born 8 March 1964) is a Chilean lawyer and politician of the Independent Democratic Union (UDI). From 2018 to 2026, she served as a senator for Constituency 2, corresponding to Tarapacá Region. From 2010 to 2014, she was the region's intendant, during the first administration of President Sebastián Piñera.

== Early life and education ==
Luz Ebensperger was born in Puerto Montt on 8 March 1964, the daughter of Victor Eduardo Ebensperger Aburto and Alicia Orrego Fernández.

She is married to civil engineer José Andrés Díaz Brito, and they have three children.

She completed her secondary studies at the Liceo de Niñas Isidora Zegers de Huneus in Puerto Montt. She later moved to Santiago and studied law at the Pontifical Catholic University of Chile (PUC), graduating as a lawyer in 1989.

== Political career ==
From 1989 to 2004 Ebensperger held public management positions in the municipalities of Vitacura and San Joaquín. She served as deputy mayor of Alto Hospicio from 2004 to 2009.

She concurrently pursued a teaching career at the University for Development and the University of the Americas. In 2009, she was academic director of St. Thomas University in Iquique.

She was the first woman intendant of Tarapacá Region, serving from 11 March 2010 to 11 March 2014.

In 2016, she ran as a UDI candidate in the municipal primaries organized by Chile Vamos, where she defeated councilor Álvaro Jofré, becoming the coalition's candidate for mayor of Iquique. In the October 2016 elections, she was narrowly defeated by Nueva Mayoría candidate Jorge Soria Machiavello.

In August 2017, she registered her candidacy for the Senate representing Constituency 2 in that year's general election, again within Chile Vamos. She won a seat for the 2018–2026 legislative term, receiving 21,195 votes, equivalent to 22.9% of the total.

Since 21 March 2018, she has been a member of the permanent commission of Government, Decentralization, and Regionalization, the special commissions for Extreme Areas and Special Territories, and for Water Resources, Desertification, and Drought. On 2 July 2019, she joined the permanent commission for Special Mixed Budgets and the Fourth Special Mixed Subcommittee on Budgets.
