= Rafael Prohens =

Chilean politician

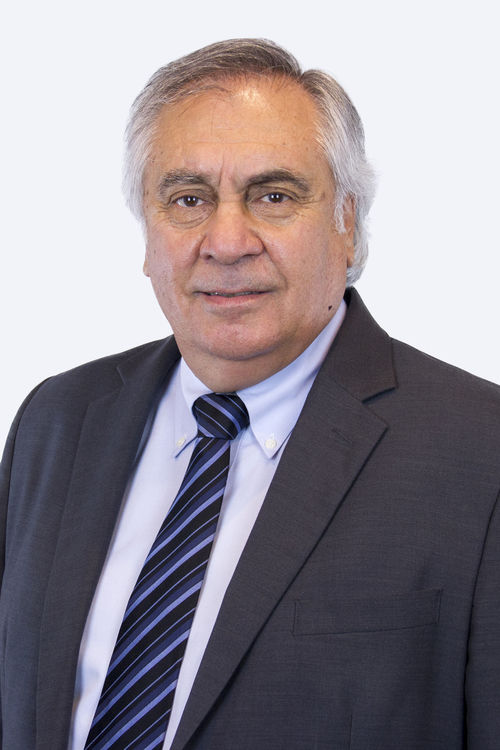

Member of the Senate
- In office 11 March 2018 – 11 March 2026
- Preceded by: Baldo Prokurica
- Succeeded by: Daniella Cicardini
- Constituency: 4th Circumscription

Intendant of Atacama Region
- In office 1 June 2012 – 11 March 2014
- President: Sebastián Piñera
- Preceded by: Ximena Matas Quilodrán
- Succeeded by: Miguel Vargas Correa

Councilman of Copiapó
- In office 6 December 2004 – 6 December 2008

Regional Counselor of Atacama Region
- In office 26 September 1992 – 6 December 2002
- Preceded by: Arturo Urcullú
- Succeeded by: Yhanss Delgado

Personal details
- Born: 12 May 1955 (age 70) Tierra Amarilla, Chile
- Party: National Renewal
- Children: Two
- Parent(s): Alfonso Prohens; Berta Espinosa
- Occupation: Politician

Rafael Prohens Espinoza (born 12 June 1955) is a Chilean politician and entrepreneur who currently serves as a member of the Senate of his country.

A member of National Renewal (RN), he served as a member of the Senate of Chile representing the Atacama Region between 2018 and 2026.

== Early life and education ==
Prohens was born on 12 June 1955 in Copiapó. He is the son of Alfonso Prohens Arias, a pioneer of agricultural development in northern Chile who introduced table grape cultivation and modern irrigation systems in the region, and Berta Espinosa Ansieta. He is the seventh of nine siblings.

He is the father of two daughters.

He completed his primary education at Escuela Superior No. 1 in Copiapó and later moved to Santiago, where he attended Colegio Hispano Americano. He completed his secondary education in 1973 at Colegio Excelsior.

== Professional career ==
After completing his mandatory military service, Prohens returned to the Atacama Region, where he devoted himself to agricultural activity, particularly the cultivation and export of table grapes in the Copiapó Valley.

In parallel, he developed business and agricultural ventures linked to regional production and export activities.

== Political career ==
Prohens began his political career in 1992, when he ran as a candidate for mayor and municipal councillor of Tierra Amarilla under the banner of National Renewal within the Participación y Progreso pact. He obtained the highest number of votes, with 1,109 ballots cast (21.99%). Under the legislation in force at the time, he was appointed mayor by the municipal council, serving in that capacity until 1996.

Between 1996 and 2002, he served as a Regional Councillor of the Atacama Region, elected indirectly by the municipal council in accordance with the legislation then in force.

In the 2004 Chilean municipal election, the first election separating mayoral and councillor races, Prohens ran as a candidate for municipal councillor of Copiapó for National Renewal. He was elected with the second-highest vote total, obtaining 7,211 votes (16.78%), and served in that position until December 2008.

From 2002 to 2010, he served as president of National Renewal in the Atacama Region.

During the 2005 and 2009 presidential campaigns, Prohens acted as regional campaign manager for Sebastián Piñera in the Atacama Region.

Following the resignation of Intendant Ximena Matas, Prohens was appointed Intendant of the Atacama Region, serving from 1 June 2012 until 11 March 2014.

In August 2017, he registered his candidacy for the Senate of Chile for the 4th senatorial constituency of the Atacama Region as a representative of National Renewal within the Chile Vamos coalition. In the 2017 Chilean general election, he was elected senator with 17,604 votes (18.50%).

He later joined the National Renewal National Executive Committee, initially serving as first vice president. Following the appointment of Mario Desbordes as Minister of Defense on 28 July 2020, Prohens assumed the role of interim president of National Renewal, later confirmed in the position, which he held until 29 June 2021.

In the 2025 Chilean general election, Prohens ran for re-election to the Senate for the same constituency, representing National Renewal within the Chile Grande y Unido coalition. He was not re-elected, obtaining 6,176 votes (3.37% of the valid votes cast).
