= Juan Luis Castro =

Chilean politician

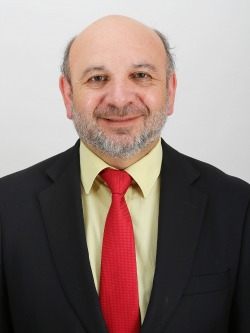
- Official portrait, 2022

Member of the Senate
- Incumbent
- Assumed office 11 March 2022
- Constituency: 8th Circunscription (O'Higgins Region)

Member of the Chamber of Deputies
- In office 11 March 2018 – 11 March 2022
- Preceded by: Creation of the District
- Constituency: District 15
- In office 11 March 2010 – 11 March 2018
- Preceded by: Esteban Valenzuela
- Succeeded by: Dissolution of the District
- Constituency: 32nd District

Personal details
- Born: 18 April 1960 (age 66) Santiago, Chile
- Party: Socialist Party
- Spouse: Andrea Mena Martineau (div. 2014)
- Children: Three
- Education: University of Chile (MD, MSc)
- Occupation: Politician
- Profession: Physician

Juan Luis Castro González (born 18 April 1960) is a Chilean physician, trade union leader and politician affiliated with the Socialist Party (PS). Since March 2022 he has served as a member of the Senate of Chile, representing the 8th Circunscription in the O'Higgins Region for the 2022–2030 legislative period. He previously sat in the Chamber of Deputies of Chile from 2010 to 2018 for District 32 (Rancagua) and from 2018 to 2022 for District 15 of the same region.

A native of Santiago, Castro studied medicine at the University of Chile, qualifying as a physician in 1985 with a specialisation in internal medicine and later in haematology. He also completed a master’s degree in health administration at the University’s School of Economics in 1994. He served as president of the Colegio Médico de Chile between 2002 and 2008, having earlier held positions as regional secretary-general and national vice-president of the organisation.

Before entering national politics, he combined his medical work in the Intensive Care Unit of the Hospital Barros Luco and the Hospital del Profesor with union activity at the national and Latin American level. In 1999 he was recognised by CNN and Time magazine as one of the “Latin American Leaders of the New Millennium”.

== Early life and education ==
Castro was born on 18 April 1960 in Santiago de Chile, the son of Juan Luis Castro González and María Eulalia González Henríquez, originally from Cáhuil in the commune of Pichilemu. He completed his secondary studies at the Instituto Miguel León Prado. He graduated as a physician from the University of Chile in 1985 and later obtained a master’s degree in health administration (1994).

He married paediatrician Andrea Luisa Mena Martineau on 8 March 1989 in Ñuñoa; the couple divorced on 6 May 2014 by ruling of the Second Family Court of Santiago. They have three children: Juan Pablo, Felipe and Gonzalo.

== Professional career ==
He practised medicine at the Intensive Care Unit of Hospital Barros Luco, at the Hospital del Profesor and in private practice in Rancagua. His union career began in 1985 as president of the Association of Young Doctors, a position he held until 1987. He then joined the Colegio Médico de Chile as secretary-general of the Santiago Regional Council (1990–1993), president of the same Council (1993–1996) and later national vice-president (1996–2001). Following the resignation of Enrique Accorsi in 2001, Castro became interim president of the College, being confirmed in 2002 and re-elected in 2005; he was succeeded in 2008 by Pablo Rodríguez Whipple.

He also served as finance secretary of the Latin American Medical Confederation (CONFEMEL, 1999–2000) and vice-president for Professional Affairs (2007–2008). Since 2008 he has headed the Department of Health Studies and Policy of the Colegio Médico.

== Political career ==
Castro joined the Socialist Youth (JS) during the 1980s and has remained a member of the Socialist Party. He was first elected to the Chamber of Deputies of Chile in the 2009 elections for District 32 (Rancagua), obtaining around 30 percent of the vote. He was re-elected in 2013 and again in 2017 for the new District 15 of the O’Higgins Region.

During his parliamentary career he has served on the standing committees on Health — which he chaired — as well as Mining and Energy, Science and Technology, and Ethics and Transparency. In 2019 he stood for the vice-presidency of the Socialist Party, contesting the position against senator Juan Pablo Letelier.

In August 2021, he registered his candidacy for the Senate within the «New Social Pact» coalition, representing the O’Higgins Region for the 2022–2030 term. In the November 2021 elections, he was elected with 51 428 votes (15.19 %). He took office on 11 March 2022.
