= Osvaldo Urrutia =

Chilean politician

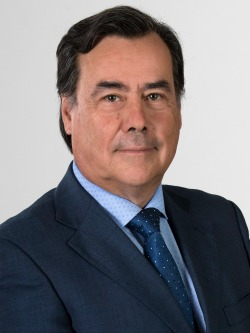

Member of the Chamber of Deputies of Chile
- Incumbent
- Assumed office 11 March 2018
- Preceded by: Creation of the district
- Constituency: District 7
- In office 11 March 2014 – 11 March 2018
- Preceded by: Edmundo Eluchans
- Succeeded by: Dissolution of the district
- Constituency: 14th District

Mayor of the Puchuncaví
- In office 1983 – 15 July 1989
- Appointed by: Augusto Pinochet
- Preceded by: Carlos Ortíz Fernández
- Succeeded by: Camilo Pérez Vicencio

Personal details
- Born: 28 November 1951 (age 74) Valparaíso, Chile
- Party: Independent Democratic Union
- Education: Pontifical Catholic University of Valparaíso (BA)
- Profession: Civil engineer

Osvaldo Alejandro Nicanor Urrutia Soto (born 28 November 1951) is a Chilean civil engineer who currently serves as deputy.
