= Rolando Rentería =

Chilean politician (born 1968)

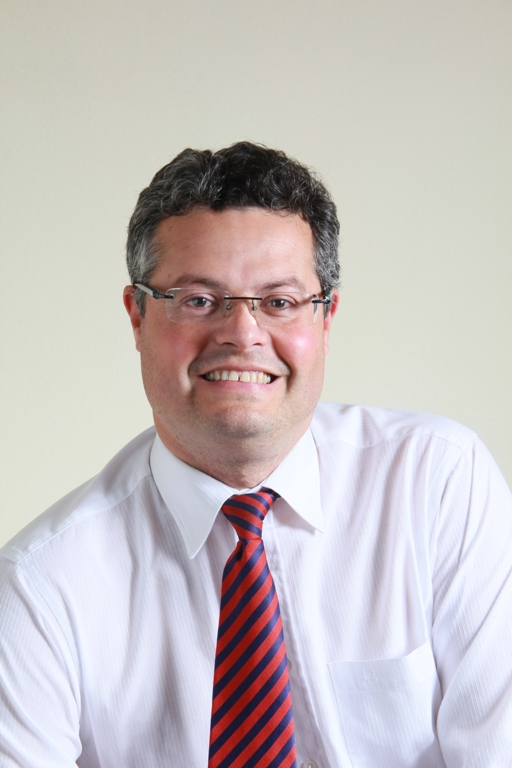

Member of the Chamber of Deputies
- In office 11 March 2018 – 11 March 2022
- Preceded by: Creation of the district
- Constituency: 18th District

Mayor of Linares
- In office 6 November 2008 – 18 November 2016
- Preceded by: Rodrigo Hermosilla
- Succeeded by: Mario Meza

Personal details
- Born: 19 August 1968 (age 57) Santiago, Chile
- Party: Independent Democratic Union (UDI)
- Occupation: Politician

Rolando Ramón Rentería Möller (Santiago, August 19, 1968) is a Chilean agricultural technician and politician, member of the Independent Democratic Union (UDI) party, former mayor of the commune of Linares. From 2018 to 2022 he served in the Chamber of Deputies of Chile representing district No. 18.

He is one of the three children of the marriage formed by Rolando Rentería Medina (1941–2011), who was a union leader and regional councilor for Maule, and María Angélica Moller Rojas.

== Political career ==
He was a councilor of the commune of Linares between 2000 and 2008.

In the 2008 municipal elections, he was elected mayor of Linares with 53.58%, beating PS Rodrigo Hermosilla, who was up for re-election and obtained only 35.65%. The validly cast votes were 37,673, 1,758 invalid votes, and 1,047 blank votes out of a total of 40,478 votes cast. He was re-elected for a second term in 2012.

At the beginning of 2016 he announced that he would not run for re-election for the third term, to begin a candidacy for Congress in the 2017 elections. For this reason, he presented his early resignation to the Municipality in October 2016, which would take place count from November 18.
