= Juan Castro Prieto =

Chilean politician (born 1959)

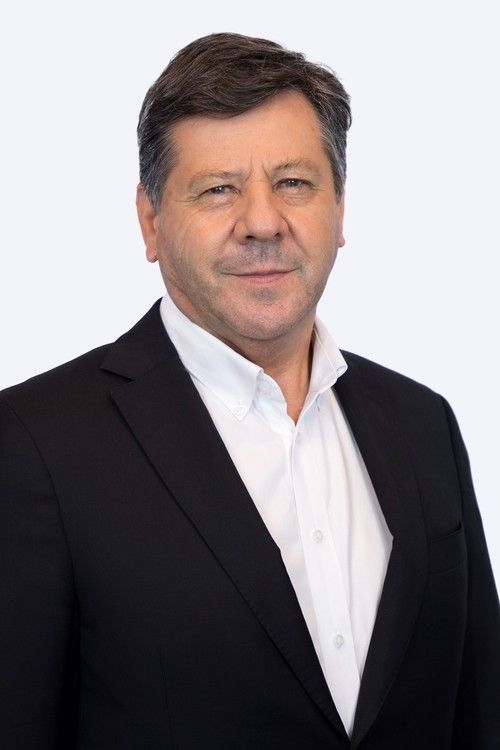

Member of the Senate of Chile
- In office 11 March 2018 – 11 March 2026
- Preceded by: Creation of the circumscription
- Constituency: 9th Circumscription (Maule Region)

Mayor of Talca
- In office 6 December 2008 – 17 November 2016
- Preceded by: Patricio Herrera
- Succeeded by: Juan Carlos Díaz

Personal details
- Born: 1 November 1959 (age 66) San Clemente, Chile
- Party: Christian Social Party
- Occupation: Politician

Juan Enrique Castro Prieto (born 1 November 1959) is a Chilean politician who served as a member of the Senate of Chile.

As mayor of Talca, Castro reorganized municipal finances inherited with heavy debt and secured approval of the city’s Master Plan. He promoted urban improvements in green areas, sidewalks, public lighting, and cleaning, while elevating the Independence Festival into a nationally broadcast event.

In culture and sports, he created municipal corporations and opened the Municipal Cultural Center, with Talca later hosting the 2015 FIFA U-17 World Cup. In healthcare, he inaugurated the Magisterio Primary Health Center, launched the region’s first people’s pharmacy, and introduced the Talca Sonríe program, consolidating his reputation and paving the way to the Senate.

== Political career ==
=== Mayor of Talca ===
Castro began his municipal administration with a strong budget adjustment due to inherited debts, which involved reorganizing finances, paying outstanding obligations, reducing funds allocated to social organizations, and canceling contracts signed by the previous administration. Among the milestones of his tenure was also the approval of the Master Plan.

His administration was noted for improvements in urban infrastructure, as well as for promoting local identity through events such as the Independence Festival, which became a national event broadcast by Televisión Nacional de Chile (TVN) and attracted massive attendance. In the cultural and sports fields, he promoted the creation of municipal corporations and the Municipal Cultural Center, while also positioning Talca as a host city for the 2015 FIFA U-17 World Cup, the first tournament of that scale held in the city.

In healthcare, he inaugurated the Magisterio Primary Health Center (CESFAM) and the region’s first people’s pharmacy, “Junto a Ti,” which provided medicines at cost and was widely accepted. He also implemented the “Talca Sonríe” program, which offered dental care to thousands of residents.

=== Senate ===
In 2017, parliamentary elections were held in Chile, which resulted in changes to regional councilors, members of the Chamber of Deputies, and the Senate. In the case of the Senate, the election in the Maule Region was described as the "mother of all battles," since several prominent national figures such as Álvaro Elizalde, Alfredo Sfeir, Andrés Zaldívar, Ximena Rincón, and Juan Antonio Coloma Correa competed for the five available Senate seats.

Castro, described as "the safest winner" by national media outlets such as El Mercurio, ran as part of the Chile Vamos coalition, alongside Rodrigo Galilea, Juan Antonio Coloma Correa, Macarena Pons, Yasna Cancino, and Francisca Concha Le-Beuffe. After an intense campaign, Castro was elected senator with 14.7% of the vote, totaling 54,503 ballots, the majority of them in the city of Talca.

As a result, Chile Vamos secured three senators in Maule—Juan Antonio Coloma Correa, Rodrigo Galilea, and Juan Castro—while the Nueva Mayoría won two seats with Ximena Rincón and Álvaro Elizalde.
