= Camilo Morán =

Chilean politician

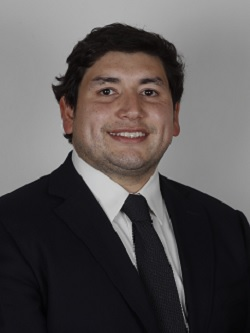

Member of the Chamber of Deputies
- In office 28 July 2020 – 11 March 2022
- Preceded by: Mario Desbordes
- Constituency: 8th District

Personal details
- Born: 17 April 1990 (age 36) Lo Prado, Santiago, Chile
- Party: Renovación Nacional
- Spouse: María Jesús Collado
- Parent(s): Camilo Morán Arce; Yaqueline Bahamondes Villar
- Education: Bolivarian University of Chile (BA)
- Occupation: Politician
- Profession: Public administrator

Camilo Andrés Morán Bahamondes (born 17 April 1990) is a Chilean politician.
