= Tomás Fuentes =

Chilean politician

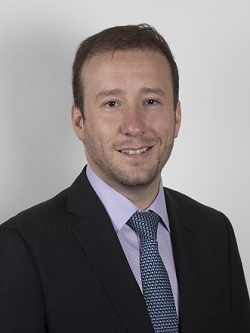

Member of the Chamber of Deputies
- In office 6 August 2020 – 11 March 2022
- Preceded by: Marcela Sabat
- Constituency: 10th District

Councilman of Las Condes
- In office 6 December 2012 – 6 December 2016

Councilman of La Reina
- In office 6 December 2008 – 6 December 2012

Personal details
- Born: 10 March 1985 (age 41) Santiago, Chile
- Party: Renovación Nacional
- Children: Three
- Education: Central University of Chile; Universidad Mayor (MA)
- Occupation: Politician

Tomás Andrés Fuentes Barros (born 10 March 1985) is a Chilean politician.

== Early life and education ==
Fuentes was born in Santiago, Chile, on March 10, 1985. He is the son of Gregorio Fernando Fuentes Cánovas and María Alicia Barros Von Holt.

He is married to commercial engineer María Fernanda Frías Bravo and is the father of three children.

He completed his primary and secondary education at Colegio Antártica Chilena in Vitacura, Santiago, graduating in 2002.

He later entered the Central University of Chile, where he earned a degree in Political Science on January 14, 2008.

He subsequently completed a Master’s degree in Strategic Communication and Branding at Universidad Mayor. His master’s thesis was titled Importancia del marketing político en el sistema de voto voluntario. He has professional experience in political strategy and electoral intelligence, electoral studies, data management and analysis, and microtargeting.

== Political career ==
Fuentes began his political activism in the Youth wing of National Renewal, later serving as its president between 2007 and 2009.

Between 2005 and 2010, he worked as an advisor to then-deputy Cristián Monckeberg.

In the 2008 municipal elections, he ran for city councilor in La Reina, Santiago Metropolitan Region, and was elected with 4,793 votes, corresponding to 10.59% of the votes obtained by his list.

In the 2012 municipal elections, he again ran for city councilor, this time in Las Condes, and was elected with 8,168 votes, equivalent to 14.83% of his list, serving for the 2012–2016 term.

During the first administration of President Sebastián Piñera, he worked in the Division of Political and Institutional Relations of the Ministry General Secretariat of the Presidency. He also served as Deputy Director of the National Youth Institute (INJUV), resigning on June 30, 2013. During this same period, he served as Chief of Staff to the Undersecretary of the Armed Forces.

In the 2013 parliamentary elections, he served as campaign manager and electoral administrator for the senatorial candidacy of Andrés Allamand in the 8th senatorial constituency.

In 2014, he was elected Vice President of National Renewal as part of the party leadership headed by Cristián Monckeberg. In 2015, he resigned from the party following the leadership’s decision not to hold primary elections in municipalities where the party already had incumbents, later rejoining as a member.

In the municipal elections held on October 23, 2016, he ran for a seat on the Municipal Council of Vitacura, obtaining 1,623 votes (12.59%), but was not elected.

In the general internal elections of National Renewal held in November 2018, he was elected Vice President of the party and became a member of its Political Commission for the 2018–2020 term.

Until July 28, 2020, he served as Chief of Staff to Senator Andrés Allamand.

In August 2021, he registered his candidacy for re-election to the Chamber of Deputies of Chile for the 14th electoral district of the Santiago Metropolitan Region, representing National Renewal within the Chile Podemos Más coalition. In the parliamentary elections held on November 21, 2021, he obtained 8,193 votes, equivalent to 2.51% of the total valid votes, and was not re-elected.
