= Daniel Núñez (Chilean politician) =

Chilean politician

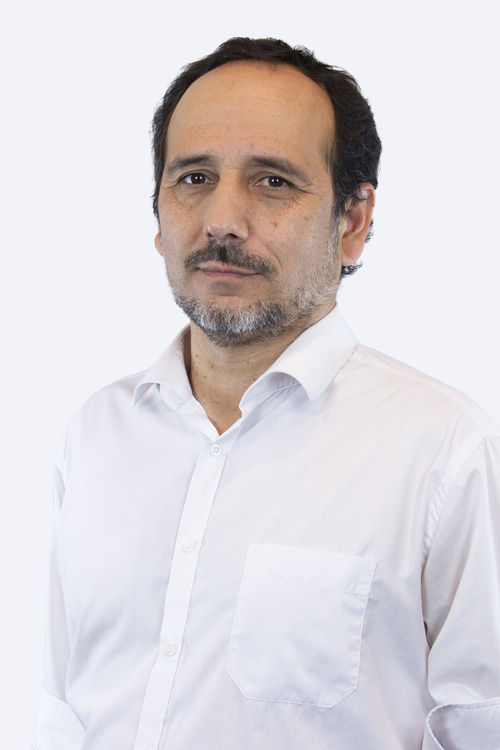

Member of the Senate
- Incumbent
- Assumed office 11 March 2022
- Constituency: 5th Circumscription (Coquimbo Region)

Member of the Chamber of Deputies
- In office 11 March 2018 – 11 March 2022
- Preceded by: Creation of the district
- Constituency: District 5
- In office 11 March 2014 – 11 March 2018
- Preceded by: Pedro Velásquez
- Succeeded by: Dissolution of the Office
- Constituency: 8th District (Coquimbo, Ovalle and Río Hurtado)

Personal details
- Born: 7 January 1971 (age 55) Santiago, Chile
- Party: Communist Party
- Spouse: Rossana Zurita
- Children: Two
- Parent(s): Omar Núñez; Fedora Arancibia
- Education: University of Chile (B.Sc)
- Occupation: Politician
- Profession: Sociologist

Daniel Ignacio Núñez Arancibia (born 7 January 1971) is a Chilean politician who is currently serving as senator.

A member of the Communist Party of Chile, he has served as a senator for the Coquimbo Region since 2022 and previously represented the region in the Chamber of Deputies.

== Early life and education ==
Núñez was born on 7 January 1971 in Santiago. He is the son of Omar Alberto Núñez Quevedo and Fedora María Isabel Arancibia Riderelli. He is married to Rossanna Zurita, and is the father of two children.

He completed his primary education at Colegio Latinoamericano de Integración and his secondary education at Colegio Francisco Miranda and Liceo de Aplicación in Santiago. He earned a degree in sociology from the University of Chile.

He later completed a master’s degree in Latin American social and political studies at the Alberto Hurtado University in Santiago. In 2002, he submitted his master’s thesis titled El despertar del movimiento estudiantil y la crisis de la Universidad Pública 1994–2000.

== Academic and professional career ==
Between 2004 and 2010, Núñez served as coordinator of the Labour Studies Programme and as chairman of the board of the Alejandro Lipschutz Institute of Social Sciences (ICAL).

At the ARCIS University, he worked as an undergraduate and postgraduate lecturer in subjects including sociology of work and social movement studies.

Until May 2013, he served as general secretary of ARCIS University.

== Political career ==
In 1988, while still a secondary school student, Núñez served as president of the Federation of Secondary Students (FESES).

In 1992, he held the position of vice-president of the Federation of Students of the University of Chile (FECh). Between 1998 and 2001, he served as general secretary of the Communist Youth of Chile.

In 2001, he became a member of the Central Committee and the Political Commission of the Communist Party of Chile.

In the 2017 general election, Núñez was re-elected as a member of the Chamber of Deputies for the 5th District of the Coquimbo Region, representing the Communist Party of Chile for the 2018–2022 term. He obtained 15,300 votes, corresponding to 6.60% of the valid votes cast.

In August 2021, he registered his candidacy for the Senate of Chile representing the Communist Party within the Apruebo Dignidad coalition for the 5th senatorial constituency of the Coquimbo Region. In the 2021 general election, he was elected senator with 39,414 votes (16.18%), obtaining the highest vote share in the constituency.
