= Iván Moreira =

Chilean politician (b. 1956)

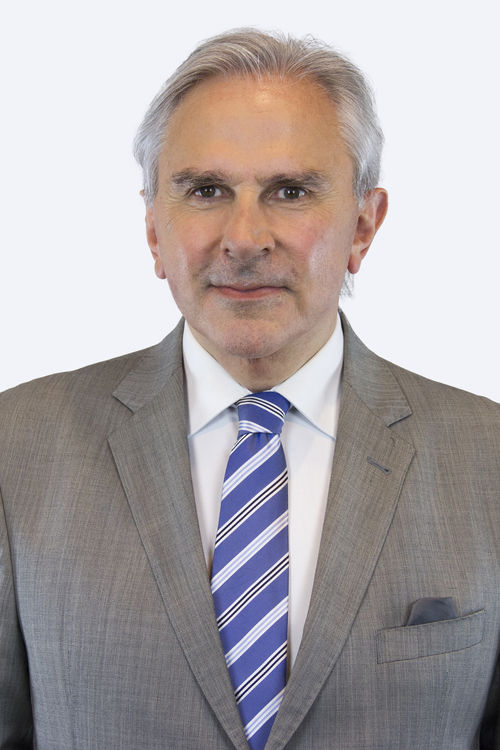
- Official portrait (2010)

Member of the Senate
- Incumbent
- Assumed office 11 March 2014
- Preceded by: Carlos Kuschel
- Constituency: 7th Circumscription

Member of the Chamber of Deputies
- In office 11 March 1994 – 11 March 2014
- Preceded by: Hernán Rojo
- Succeeded by: Daniel Melo Contreras
- Constituency: 27th District

Mayor of La Cisterna
- In office 11 August 1989 – 6 December 1992
- Preceded by: Gonzalo Stefani
- Succeeded by: Rodolfo Pereira

Personal details
- Born: 8 December 1956 (age 69) Santiago, Chile
- Party: National Party (PN; 1970–1992); Unión Demócrata Independiente (UDI; 1992–present)
- Spouses: María Pía Lavín (div.); Carmen Ibáñez (div.); Isabela Marinovic (m. 2018)
- Children: Two
- Parent(s): Julio César Moreira; Marta Barros
- Occupation: Politician

Iván Alejandro Moreira Barros (born 8 December 1956) is a Chilean public relations professional and politician affiliated with the Independent Democratic Union (UDI).

Since 2014 he has served as a member of the Senate of Chile, representing the Los Lagos Region. He previously sat in the Chamber of Deputies of Chile for five consecutive terms between 1994 and 2014, and earlier served as appointed mayor of La Cisterna from 1989 to 1992 during the final years of the military government of Augusto Pinochet.

He began his professional life as a radio announcer on Radio Polar in Punta Arenas before establishing a career in public relations, joining the Colegio de Relacionadores Públicos de Chile. In the 1980s he worked as an adviser at the Ministry General Secretariat of the Presidency and in the public relations department of Televisión Nacional de Chile (TVN).

A long-standing figure of the Chilean right, Moreira began his political activity in the National Party youth in Punta Arenas and joined the UDI during the democratic era. Over his parliamentary career he has served on committees dealing with foreign affairs, science, agriculture and human rights, and is known for his outspoken Evangelical faith and conservative views. He has described his intention to become a pastor upon retiring from politics.

== Biography ==
Moreira was born in Santiago on 8 December 1956, the son of Julio César Moreira Cabrera and Marta Liliana Barros Alemparte. He completed his primary education at Salesian schools — Don Bosco School in La Cisterna and San José School in Punta Arenas — and graduated from Luis Alberto Barrera High School in 1976.

He began his professional life as a radio announcer on the programme Buenas Noches, Buena Música broadcast by Radio Polar in Punta Arenas, later working in public relations and joining the Colegio de Relacionadores Públicos de Chile. In 1986 he served as a political adviser at the Ministry General Secretariat of the Presidency and, the following year, in the public relations department of Televisión Nacional de Chile.

He was married to María Pía Lavín and later to Carmen Ibáñez, and is the father of two children. An adherent of the Evangelical faith, he has expressed the wish to become a pastor after leaving political life.

== Political career ==
Moreira began his political career in Punta Arenas as president of the National Party Youth between 1971 and 1973. He later served as a delegate of the National Youth Secretariat in Magallanes (1978–1981) and held various administrative posts under the military government in the municipalities of Punta Arenas, La Pintana and La Cisterna (1981–1989).

In 1989 he was appointed mayor of La Cisterna, a position he held until 1992, when democratically elected municipal authorities took office. In 1993 he was elected to the Chamber of Deputies of Chile for District 27 (El Bosque, La Cisterna and San Ramón), winning 28% of the vote. He was re-elected in 1997, 2001, 2005 and 2009, serving on standing committees including Foreign Affairs, Science and Technology, and Housing. Between 2010 and 2011 he served as Second Vice-President of the Chamber of Deputies and as Vice-President of the UDI.

In the 2013 elections he was elected senator for the Los Lagos Region with 19.1% of the vote, becoming the first self-declared Evangelical senator in Chile. He has been a member of the Standing Committees on Environment and National Assets, Agriculture, Foreign Affairs and Human Rights, and has participated in the Special Commission on Extreme and Special Territories.
