= José Durana =

Chilean politician

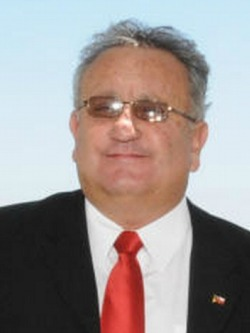

Member of the Senate
- In office 11 March 2018 – 11 March 2026
- Preceded by: Jaime Orpis
- Succeeded by: Enrique Lee
- Constituency: 1st Circunscription

Intendant of the Arica and Parinacota Region
- In office 2 November 2011 – 11 March 2014
- President: Sebastián Piñera
- Preceded by: Rodolfo Barbosa
- Succeeded by: Emilio Rodríguez Ponce

Governor of the Arica Province
- In office 15 March 2010 – 2 November 2011
- President: Sebastián Piñera
- Preceded by: Luis Gutiérrez
- Succeeded by: Ximena Valcarce

Councilman of Arica
- In office 6 December 2004 – 15 March 2010

Personal details
- Born: 27 June 1960 (age 66) Arica, Chile
- Party: Independent Democratic Union
- Spouse: Cibeles Adriana Mc-Conell
- Children: Two
- Education: University of Tarapacá
- Occupation: Politician
- Profession: Auditor accountant

José Miguel Alberto Durana Semir (born 27 June 1960) is a Chilean politician and a member of the Senate of Chile.

== Biography ==
Durana was born on 27 June 1960 in Arica. He is the son of José Durana Silva and Sara Elia Semir Villalobos. He is married to Cibeles Mc-Conell Ordóñez, a teacher of Language and Communication. He has three children: Sebastián and José, both lawyers, and Cibeles, a commercial engineer.

Durana began his primary education in 1966 at the Grupo Escolar de Hombres and completed his secondary education at Colegio San Marcos de Arica in 1978. In 1979, he entered the Faculty of Sciences, Administration and Economics of the University of Tarapacá, where he earned a degree as Public Accountant and Auditor in 1986, graduating with distinction.

== Political career ==
Durana began his political career as Regional Secretary (First Region of Tarapacá) of the National Youth Secretariat, a position he held during the final years of the military regime of Augusto Pinochet.

In the Tarapacá Region, between 1991 and 2006, he served as district president of the Independent Democratic Union (UDI). He later served as regional president of the party in the Arica and Parinacota Region between 2008 and 2010.

Between 2001 and 2010, he was in charge of the parliamentary office of Senator Jaime Orpis, where he worked as an advisor and coordinator of the productive and social agenda.

In 2004, he ran for the position of councillor of the Municipality of Arica as a representative of the UDI. He was elected with 4,376 votes, equivalent to 7.06% of the valid votes cast. In 2008, he was re-elected councillor for the same commune with 4,283 votes, equivalent to 6.99% of the valid votes cast.

In March 2010, he resigned from his position as councillor to assume office as Governor of the Province of Arica, under the administration of President Sebastián Piñera.

Following the resignation of Intendant Rodolfo Barbosa Barrios, he assumed office on 2 November 2011 as Intendant of the Arica and Parinacota Region, a position he held until 11 March 2014.

In the 2016 municipal primary election, he competed to represent the UDI as the sole candidate of the sector for the mayoralty of Arica. He secured the nomination with 2,383 votes, equivalent to 56.35% of the votes cast. He subsequently ran in the municipal elections held on 23 October 2016, obtaining 10,056 votes, equivalent to 21.33% of the votes cast, and was not elected.

Following his defeat in the municipal elections, the Regional Council Board of the Independent Democratic Union in Arica and Parinacota announced its decision to compete in the 2017 parliamentary elections together with local representatives.

In August 2017, he registered his candidacy for the Senate for the 1st Senatorial District, Arica and Parinacota Region, representing the Independent Democratic Union within the Chile Vamos coalition. In the parliamentary elections held on 19 November 2017, he was elected with 9,639 votes, equivalent to 13.50% of the valid votes cast.

He ran for re-election for the same district in the parliamentary elections held on 16 November 2025, representing the Independent Democratic Union within the Chile Grande y Unido coalition. He was not elected, obtaining 18,470 votes, equivalent to 13.44% of the valid votes cast.
