= Carmen Gloria Aravena =

Chilean politician

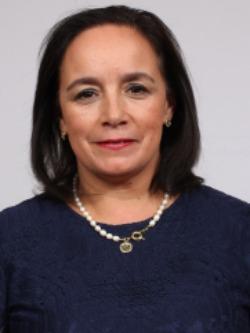

Member of the Senate of Chile
- In office 11 March 2018 – 11 March 2026
- Constituency: 5th Circunscription (Araucanía Region

Personal details
- Born: 6 January 1967 (age 59) Temuco, Chile
- Party: Evópoli (2016−2019); Independent (2019−2023); Republican Party (2023−)
- Spouse: Horacio Contreras (1998−2017)
- Children: Three
- Parent(s): Osvaldo Aravena; Miro del Carmen Acuña
- Education: University of La Frontera (LL.B, 1992) (LL.M, 2011); Temuco Catholic University (PgD, 1996)
- Occupation: Politician
- Profession: Lawyer

Carmen Gloria Aravena Acuña (born 6 January 1967) is a Chilean politician who serves as a member of the Senate of Chile. She is a member of the Republican Party since 2023.

Aravena completed her primary and secondary education at Colegio La Salle de Temuco. She studied Agricultural Engineering at the Faculty of Agricultural and Forestry Sciences of the University of La Frontera between 1985 and 1991, and obtained her professional degree in 1992. Her undergraduate thesis was titled Características físico-químicas de variedades de manzanas provenientes de dos zonas agroclimáticas distintas para uso agroindustrial.

Aravena served as a teaching assistant in the courses Forage Crops I and Postharvest Physiology and Management at her faculty. She also holds postgraduate diplomas in Intercultural Local Development from the Temuco Catholic University (1996), and in Local Development (Development Agents) from Fundación Impulsa–Redesol–Azul Consultores, Villarrica campus (2002).

She completed the Master’s program in Human, Local and Territorial Development at the Institute of Local and Regional Development of the University of La Frontera (2010–2011), and obtained the academic degree of Master in 2015. Her master’s thesis was titled El fortalecimiento gremial incrementa el capital social: experiencia de la Cámara de Comercio de Traiguén.

== Biography ==
She was born on 6 January 1967 in Temuco. She is the daughter of Osvaldo Aravena Salgado and Miro del Carmen Acuña Leiva.

She has worked as a lecturer in the Agricultural Technician program at INACAP (1992), and as a lecturer and manager of the agricultural demonstration farm of the Methodist Corporation in Nueva Imperial between 1993 and 1995.

Between 1996 and 1997, she was responsible for the project Contribución al desarrollo de la familia mapuche a través de la capacitación y organización de la mujer, aimed at creating and supporting groups of Mapuche women in the commune of Nueva Imperial.

She served as a lecturer in the Diploma in Municipal Management for Territorial Human Development at the University of La Frontera (2004), and in the Diploma in Economic and Territorial Development (2008), financed by the European Union.

Between 2002 and 2005, she served as Director of the Local Economic Development Unit of the Municipality of Nueva Imperial. She later worked as Regional Director of the Technical Cooperation Service (Sercotec) in Temuco from 2005 to 2014.

For a brief period, she worked as a civil servant at the Municipality of Lumaco.

From 7 April 2014 to July 2016, she served as Municipal Administrator of the commune of Traiguén.

== Political career ==
Her political and public career has focused on issues of local and productive development in the Araucanía Region, both through her work at the Technical Cooperation Service and through her professional activities.

She was a member of the Political Evolution party (Evópoli), and upon its formal establishment in the Araucanía Region in April 2016, she assumed the position of regional vice-president of the party.

In August 2017, she registered her candidacy for the Senate for the 11th Senatorial District, Araucanía Region, representing Political Evolution in the parliamentary elections held on 19 November 2017. She was elected with 4,185 votes, equivalent to 1.24% of the valid votes cast, becoming the first woman elected as Senator for the Araucanía Region.

In April 2019, after three years of party membership, she resigned from Political Evolution.

On 26 January 2023, she joined the Republican Party, but resigned from the party on 30 April 2025.

== Distinctions ==
In 2010, she received recognition for her professional career from the Diocese of Temuco and the University of La Frontera for her commitment to regional development.

In 2012, Aravena was recognized by the National Women's Service (SERNAM) for her commitment to female entrepreneurship in the Araucanía Region. In 2013, she was recognized by the National Confederation of Commerce of Chile for her contribution to strengthening trade associations in the Araucanía Region.
