= Gustavo Sanhueza =

Chilean politician

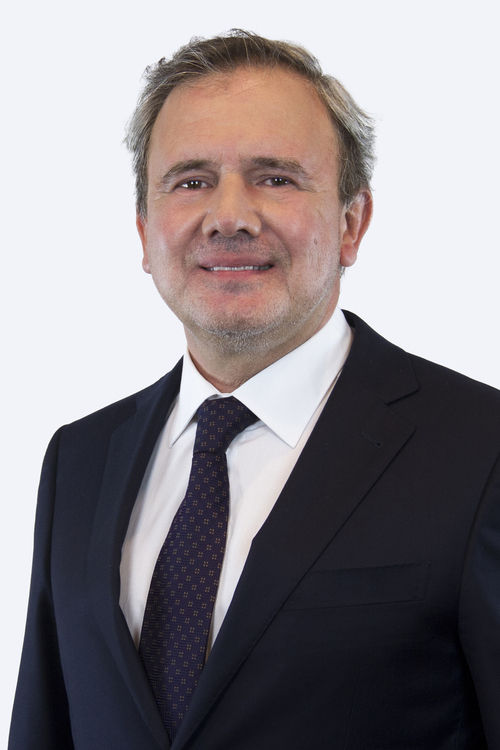

Member of the Senate
- Incumbent
- Assumed office 11 March 2022
- Preceded by: Creation of the circumscription
- Constituency: 16th Circumscription (Ñuble Region)

Member of the Chamber of Deputies
- In office 11 March 2018 – 11 March 2022
- Preceded by: Creation of the district
- Constituency: District 19

Regional Counselor of Bío Bío
- In office 11 March 2014 – 11 November 2016

Councilman of Chillán
- In office 6 December 2008 – 6 December 2012

Personal details
- Born: 10 December 1966 (age 59) Chillán, Chile
- Party: Independent Democratic Union (UDI)
- Children: Four
- Parent(s): Gilberto Sanhueza; María B. Dueñas
- Education: University of Bío Bío (B.Sc)
- Occupation: Politician
- Profession: Economist

Gustavo Adolfo Sanhueza Dueñas (born 10 December 1966) is a Chilean politician who is currently serving as parliamentary.

He has served as a regional councillor, as a member of the Chamber of Deputies of Chile, and as a senator representing the Ñuble Region.

== Biography ==
Sanhueza Dueñas was born in Chillán on 10 December 1966, the son of Gilberto Sanhueza Solís and María Berta Dueñas Rodríguez. He is divorced and has four children.

He completed his primary and secondary education at Colegio Padre Alberto Hurtado in Chillán. He later studied business engineering (ingeniería comercial) at the University of Bío-Bío in Chillán.

== Political career ==
Sanhueza began his political career in 2004 as a candidate for municipal councillor (concejal) of the Municipality of Chillán representing the Independent Democratic Union. He obtained 2,810 votes (3.89%), which was insufficient for election.

In the 2008 municipal elections, he again ran for councillor in Chillán and was elected with 1,882 votes (2.56% of the valid votes). He was re-elected in 2012, but resigned in November 2013 in order to run for regional office.

In the 2013 elections, Sanhueza was elected as a Regional Councillor (CORE) for the Province of Ñuble, then part of the Biobío Region, obtaining 12,897 votes (7.33%). He resigned from this position in November 2016, as required by law to run for parliamentary office.

In the 2017 parliamentary elections, Sanhueza ran as a candidate for the Chamber of Deputies of Chile representing the Independent Democratic Union within the Chile Vamos coalition. He was elected deputy for the 19th District of the Biobío Region, which includes the communes of Bulnes, Cabrero, Chillán, Chillán Viejo, Cobquecura, Coelemu, Coihueco, El Carmen, Ñiquén, Pemuco, Pinto, Portezuelo, Quillón, Quirihue, Ninhue, Ránquil, San Carlos, San Fabián, San Ignacio, San Nicolás, Treguaco, Yumbel, and Yungay, with 15,680 votes (8.09% of the valid votes).

On 28 December 2020, he assumed the position of national vice president of the Independent Democratic Union, serving on the party leadership for the period 2021–2022 under the presidency of Deputy Javier Macaya.

In August 2021, Sanhueza registered his candidacy for the Senate of Chile representing the Independent Democratic Union within the Chile Podemos Más coalition, for the 16th Senatorial District of the Ñuble Region (term 2022–2030). In November 2021, he was elected with 30,294 votes, corresponding to 17.31% of the valid votes cast.
