= Leopoldo Pérez =

Chilean politician

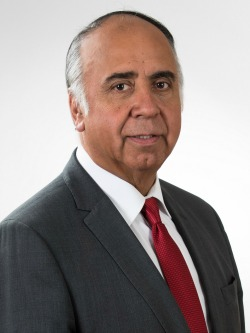

Member of the Chamber of Deputies
- In office 11 March 2018 – 11 March 2022
- Preceded by: District created
- Constituency: District 12
- In office 11 March 2010 – 11 March 2018
- Preceded by: Maximiano Errázuriz
- Succeeded by: Re-districted
- Constituency: 29th District

Personal details
- Born: 28 March 1957 (age 69) Santiago, Chile
- Party: Renovación Nacional
- Spouse: Patricia Le Roy
- Children: Two
- Education: University of Chile
- Occupation: Politician

Leopoldo Alfredo Pérez Lahsen (born 28 March 1957) is a Chilean politician.
