= Juan Ignacio Latorre =

Chilean politician

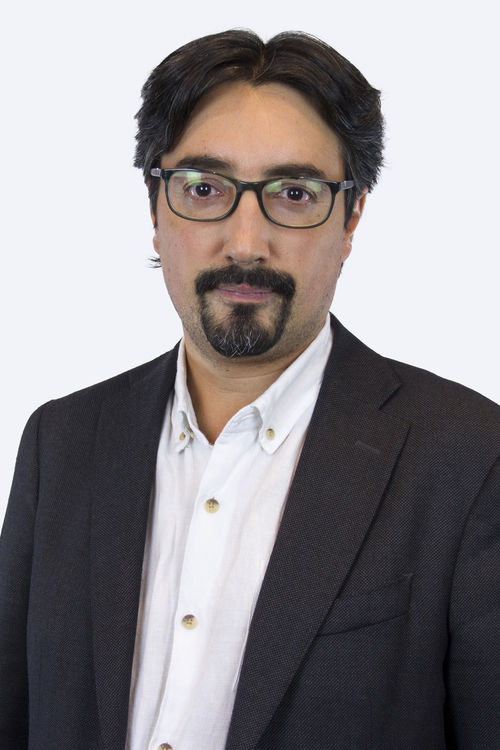

Member of the Senate
- In office 11 March 2018 – 11 March 2026
- Preceded by: Creation of the Circumscription
- Constituency: 6th Circumscription (Valparaíso Region)

Personal details
- Born: 24 March 1978 (age 48) Santiago, Chile
- Party: Democratic Revolution
- Children: One
- Parent(s): Dagoberto Latorre; Blanca Riveros
- Education: Central University of Chile (B.Sc); Autonomous University of Barcelona (M.Sc)
- Occupation: Politician
- Profession: Psychologist

Juan Ignacio Latorre Riveros (born 24 March 1978) is a Chilean politician who currently serves as a member of the Senate of his country.

== Biography ==
=== Family and early life ===
He was born in Santiago on 24 March 1978. He is the son of Dagoberto Latorre Aguayo, a former member of the Popular Unitary Action Movement and former regional director of CORFO in the Valparaíso Region, and the psychologist Blanca Riveros Soto.

He is separated and is the father of one daughter.

=== Professional career ===
He completed his primary and secondary education at Liceo B-64 of La Reina (1984–1990) and Colegio San Agustín of Ñuñoa (1991–1995), both in the Metropolitan Region of Santiago. He pursued higher education at the Central University of Chile between 1996 and 2003, where he earned a degree in Psychology.

Between 2008 and 2011, he completed a Master’s degree in Social Policy and Community Mediation at the Autonomous University of Barcelona, as well as a Master’s degree in Public Management jointly awarded by the Autonomous University of Barcelona and the University of Barcelona, in addition to a postgraduate degree in Cooperative Economics at the Autonomous University of Barcelona.

From 2015 to 2017, he was a doctoral candidate in Advanced Management of Organizations and Social Economy at Mondragon University.

Between 2011 and 2017, he served as a university lecturer in the Chair of Social and Solidarity Economy and in the Master’s program in Social Ethics and Human Development, as well as in the Chair of Social Economy and Sustainable Development, at the Alberto Hurtado University. At the time of his election as Senator of the Republic, he was Director of the Francisco Vives SJ Center for Ethics and Social Reflection (CREAS) and Director of the Diploma in Social Economy and Fair Trade at the same university.

Throughout his professional career, he has focused on the promotion of the solidarity economy, cooperativism, ethical finance, fair trade, university social responsibility, and migration, among other areas. Between 1998 and 2000, he served as director of the Children’s Shelter for homeless youth of Hogar de Cristo. Between 2004 and 2006, he worked at the Rehabilitation Center of the Paréntesis Foundation of Hogar de Cristo, and from 2006 to 2008 he served as Training Coordinator at the NGO Popular Latin American Education, part of the Fe y Alegría network of schools located in low-income communities.

== Political career ==
He began his political career in 2009 by collaborating with the presidential candidacy of Jorge Arrate, later joining the Broad Left Movement (MAIZ) in 2011, formed by the former presidential candidate.

In 2013, he participated as a volunteer in the parliamentary campaign of then-candidate Giorgio Jackson. That same year, he became a member of Democratic Revolution, participating in the Commission for a New Development Model, focusing on labor and pension issues.

In 2016, he served as Coordinator of the Political Training Team and of the Pension Coordination Committee following the marches convened by the No+AFP movement. He also collaborated with the Programmatic Board of the Broad Front. That same year, following the party’s Strategic Congress decision to contest all institutional spaces through various candidacies, he was asked to run for the Senate in the 6th Senatorial District, corresponding to the Valparaíso Region.

In the parliamentary elections held on 19 November 2017, he was elected Senator with 30,545 votes, equivalent to 4.60% of the valid votes cast.

He served as President of Democratic Revolution from July 2022 until 16 August 2023. Since July 2024, he has been a member of the Frente Amplio Party.

In the parliamentary elections held on 16 November 2025, he ran as a candidate for the Chamber of Deputies of Chile for the 6th District of the Valparaíso Region, representing the Frente Amplio within the Unidad por Chile coalition. He was not elected, obtaining 18,375 votes, equivalent to 3.12% of the total votes cast.
