= Senate of Chile =

Upper house of National Congress of Chile

Coordinates: 33°02′52″S 71°36′21″W

Senate of the Republic of Chile Senado de la República de Chile
- 57th National Congress of Chile
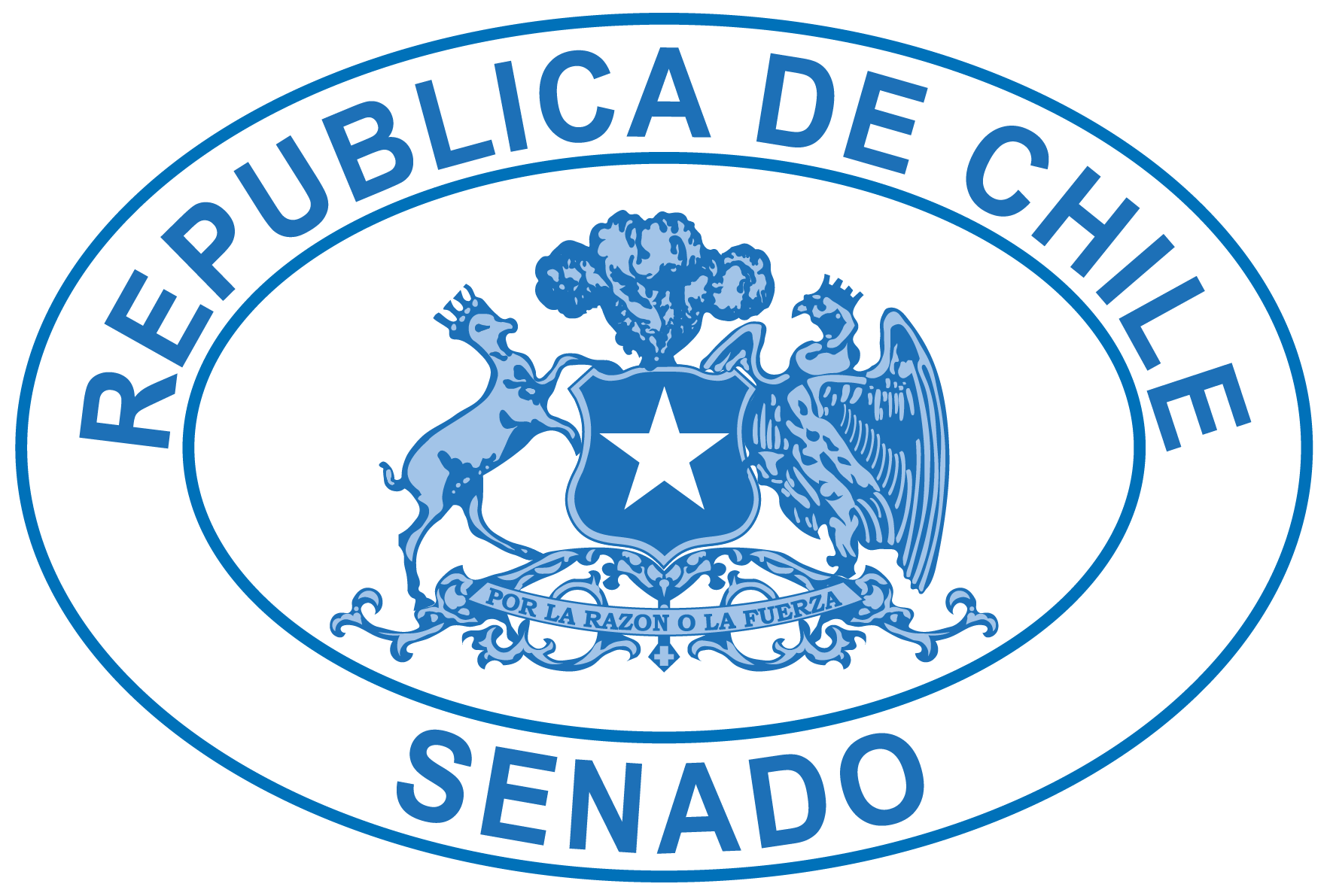
- Seal

Type
- Type: Upper House of the National Congress of Chile
- Term limits: None

Leadership
- President: Paulina Núñez Urrutia, RN since 11 March 2026
- Vice-President: Iván Moreira, UDI since 11 March 2026
- General Secretary: Julio Cámara Oyarzo since 11 March 2026

Structure
- Seats: 50
- Political groups: Government (24): ChGU (17) (Note: RN (8); UDI (5); Evópoli (2); Democrats (2)); CpCh (7) (Note: PLR (5); PSC (2)); Supported by (1): PNL (1) (Note: Part of Change for Chile); Opposition (25): UpCh (20) (Note: PS (7); PPD (4); DC (3); PCCh (3); FA (2); Liberal (1)); FREVS (2); Independents (2)
- Length of term: 8 years

Elections
- Voting system: Open list proportional representation
- Last election: 16 November 2025
- Next election: 2029

Meeting place
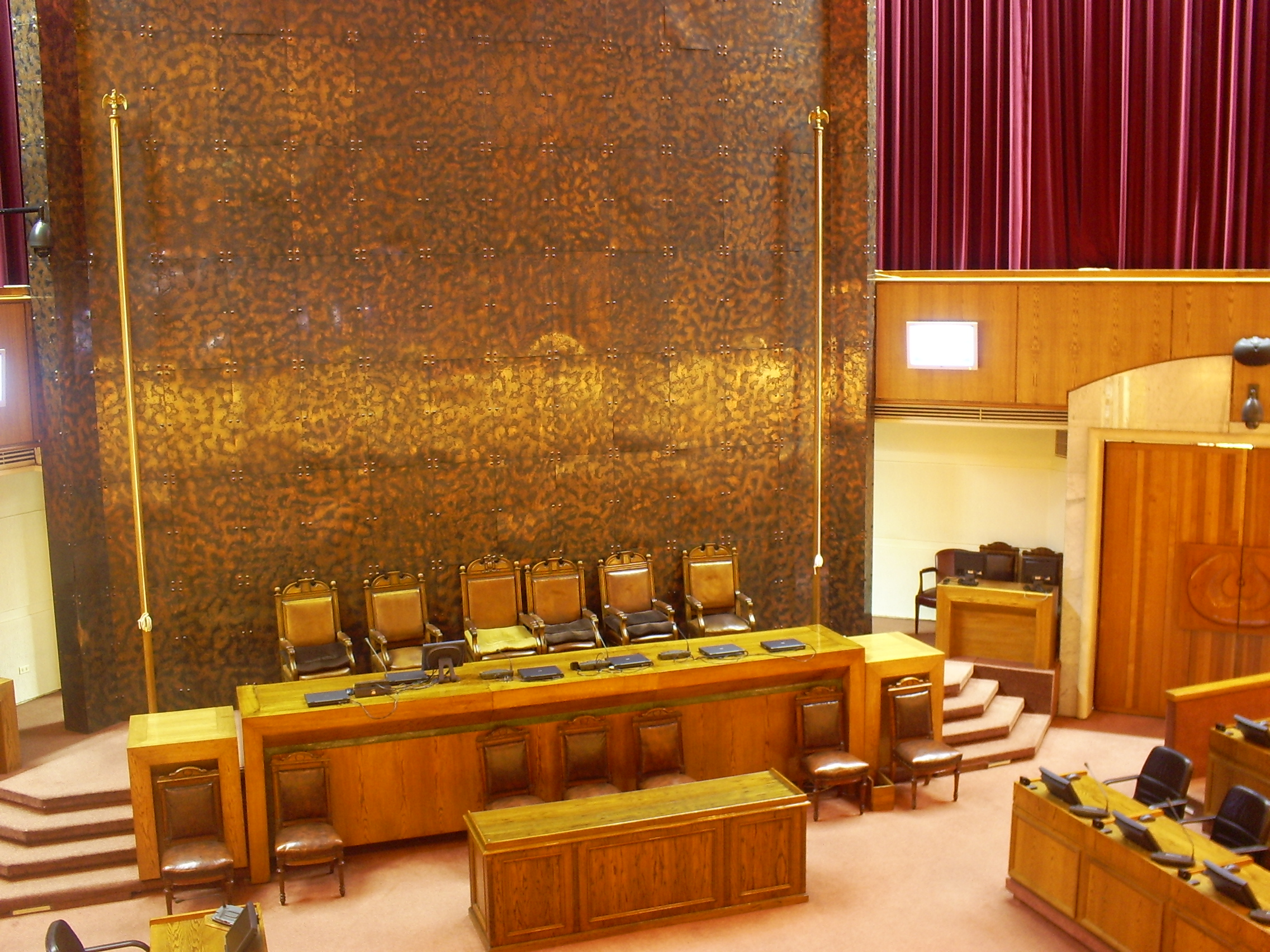
- Senate Chamber, National Congress Building, Valparaíso, Chile

Website
- https://www.senado.cl/

The Senate of the Republic of Chile is the upper house of Chile's bicameral National Congress, as established in the current Constitution of Chile.

== Composition ==
According to Article 190 of the present Constitution of Chile, the Senate is composed of fifty directly elected senators, chosen by universal popular suffrage vote in 16 senatorial circumscriptions. These serve eight-year terms, with half of them being replaced every fourth year. They must be eligible to vote, have completed secondary school or its equivalent, and be at least 35 years old. Before a 2005 reform the minimum age was 40 years.

The Senate meets at the new National Congress building located in the port city of Valparaíso that replaced the old National Congress building located in downtown Santiago, the nation's capital.

=== Abolition of the unelected ===
Amendments to the Constitution, approved by a joint session of Congress on August 16, 2005, eliminated non-directly elected senators from March 11, 2006, the day 20 newly elected senators were sworn in, leaving the total number of senators at 38, all directly elected. Previously, according to the Constitution of 1980, "designated" or "institutional" senators were appointed to the chamber. Two former heads of state, Eduardo Frei Ruiz-Tagle and Augusto Pinochet, were installed as senators for life. Pinochet later resigned from this position and Frei lost his seat in the 2005 reform. However, Frei remained in the Senate by winning an elective seat.

== Historical evolution ==
The Senate of Chile was created in 1812 to support the formulations of policies of the Government Junta. Since then it has undergone several constitutional reorganizations that have altered the scope of its constitutional powers, its composition and the generation of its members.

=== First senate ===
The senate was originally created by Article 7 of the Provisional Constitutional Manual of 1812. It was composed of seven members, who were chosen for three-year terms. Three alternate members were also named. The senate was intended to serve as a counterbalance to the executive power of the Government Junta. The senators were directly nominated by the provinces in agreement with the central government. It functioned from November, 1812 to January, 1814, when it was reorganized to better respond to the problems caused by the successive military defeats at the hands of the advancing Spanish Army.

=== Consultative senate ===
A revised senate was created by Article 13 of the Provisional Government Manual of 1814. Like the previous senate, it consisted of seven members, elected to two-year terms. The members were nominated by the provinces in lists of three from which they were selected by the Supreme Director. It functioned from March to July, 1814, when the Spanish Army captured Santiago, putting an end to the Patria Vieja government.

=== First conservative senate ===
Created by Title III of the Constitution of 1818. It was composed of five titular members and five alternate members selected directly by the Supreme Director. It was supposed to function only when the lower house was not in function or could not meet, and had the power to enact "provisory rules" that had the same effect as laws (hence the "conservative" moniker, because it "conserved" the power.) It functioned from October, 1818 to May, 1822.

== Current composition Senate of Chile ==
Constituency	Region	Senator	Name	Political Group	Party	Prior Public Office/Position	Education	Assumed office	Term Expires
I	Arica and Parinacota		José Miguel Insulza	Democratic Socialism	PS	Secretary General of the Organization of American States	University of Chile	March 11, 2018	March 11, 2026
I	Arica and Parinacota		José Durana	Chile Vamos	UDI	Intendant of the Arica y Parinacota Region during Sebastián Piñera's presidency	University of Tarapacá	March 11, 2018	March 11, 2026
II	Tarapacá		Jorge Soria	Democratic Socialism	PPD	Mayor of Iquique	Iquique Men's High School, Iquique	March 11, 2018	March 11, 2026
II	Tarapacá		Luz Ebensperger	Chile Vamos	UDI	Intendant of the Tarapacá Region during Sebastián Piñera's presidency	Pontifical Catholic University of Chile	March 11, 2018	March 11, 2026
III	Antofagasta		Pedro Araya Guerrero	Democratic Socialism	Ind. - PPD	Deputy of former District 4	University of Antofagasta	March 11, 2014	March 11, 2030
III	Antofagasta		Esteban Velásquez	Constituent Unity	FREVS	Deputy of District 3 (Antofagasta Region)	University of Tarapacá	March 11, 2022	March 11, 2030
III	Antofagasta		Paulina Núñez	Chile Vamos	RN	Deputy of District 3 (Antofagasta Region)	Catholic University of the North	March 11, 2022	March 11, 2030
IV	Atacama		Yasna Provoste	Out of pact	DC	Deputy of former District 6	University of Playa Ancha	March 11, 2018	March 11, 2026
IV	Atacama		Rafael Prohens	Chile Vamos	RN	Intendant of the Atacama Region during Sebastián Piñera's presidency	Excelsior College, Santiago	March 11, 2018	March 11, 2026
V	Coquimbo		Daniel Núñez	Apruebo Dignidad	PC	Deputy of District 5 (Coquimbo Region)	University of Chile	March 11, 2022	March 11, 2030
V	Coquimbo		Matías Walker	Out of pact	Democrats	Deputy of District 5 (Coquimbo Region)	Diego Portales University University for Development	March 11, 2022	March 11, 2030
V	Coquimbo		Sergio Gahona	Chile Vamos	UDI	Deputy of District 5 (Coquimbo Region)	Diego Portales University Catholic University of the North	March 11, 2022	March 11, 2030
VI	Valparaíso		Francisco Chahuán	Chile Vamos	RN	Deputy of former District 14	University of Valparaíso	March 11, 2010	March 11, 2026
VI	Valparaíso		Kenneth Pugh Olavarría	Chile Vamos	RN	General Director of the Personnel of the Chilean Navy	Arturo Prat Naval School, Valparaíso	March 11, 2018	March 11, 2026
VI	Valparaíso		Ricardo Lagos Weber	Democratic Socialism	PPD	Minister Secretary General of Government during Michelle Bachelet's presidency	University of Chile; University of Sussex	March 11, 2010	March 11, 2026
VI	Valparaíso		Isabel Allende	Democratic Socialism	PS	Senator for Constituency 3	University of Chile	March 11, 2018	March 11, 2026
VI	Valparaíso		Juan Ignacio Latorre	Apruebo Dignidad	RD	No previous public office	Central University of Chile	March 11, 2018	March 11, 2026
VII	Santiago Metropolitan		Manuel José Ossandón	Chile Vamos	RN	Mayor of Puente Alto	Inacap	March 11, 2014	March 11, 2030
VII	Santiago Metropolitan		Luciano Cruz-Coke	Chile Vamos	Evópoli	Deputy of District 10 (Santiago Centre)	Lee Strasberg Theatre and Film Institute	March 11, 2022	March 11, 2030
VII	Santiago Metropolitan		Claudia Pascual	Apruebo Dignidad	PC	Minister of Women and Gender Equality during Michelle Bachelet's presidency	University of Chile	March 11, 2022	March 11, 2030
VII	Santiago Metropolitan		Fabiola Campillai	Apruebo Dignidad	Independent	No previous public office	Fidel Pinochet Le-brun High School, San Bernardo Manuel Barros Borgoño High School, Santiago	March 11, 2022	March 11, 2030
VII	Santiago Metropolitan		Rojo Edwards	Out of pact	PSC	Deputy of former District 51	Pontifical Catholic University of Chile Harvard Kennedy School	March 11, 2022	March 11, 2030
VIII	O'Higgins		Alejandra Sepúlveda	Apruebo Dignidad	Independent	Deputy of District 16 (Colchagua Province)	Austral University of Chile	March 11, 2022	March 11, 2030
VIII	O'Higgins		Javier Macaya	Chile Vamos	UDI	Deputy of District 15 (Cachapoal Province)	Pontifical Catholic University of Chile	March 11, 2022	March 11, 2030
VIII	O'Higgins		Juan Luis Castro	Democratic Socialism	PS	Deputy of District 15 (Cachapoal Province)	University of Chile	March 11, 2022	March 11, 2030
IX	Maule		Juan Castro Prieto	Chile Vamos	PSC	Mayor of Talca	Industrial A-10 High School, Talca	March 11, 2018	March 11, 2026
IX	Maule		Rodrigo Galilea	Chile Vamos	RN	Intendant of the Maule Region during Sebastián Piñera's presidency	Pontifical Catholic University of Chile	March 11, 2018	March 11, 2026
IX	Maule		Juan Antonio Coloma Correa	Chile Vamos	UDI	Deputy of former District 31	Pontifical Catholic University of Chile	March 11, 2002	March 11, 2026
IX	Maule		Ximena Rincón	Out of pact	Democrats	Minister of Labor and Social Provision during Michelle Bachelet's presidency	University of Chile	March 11, 2018	March 11, 2026
IX	Maule		Paulina Vodanovic	Democratic Socialism	PS	Subsecretary for the Armed Forces during Michelle Bachelet's presidency	University of Chile	April 25, 2023	March 11, 2026
X	Biobío		Sebastián Keitel	Chile Vamos	Evópoli	Deputy of District 9 (Santiago North)	Silva Henríquez Catholic University	March 11, 2022	March 11, 2030
X	Biobío		Enrique van Rysselberghe	Chile Vamos	UDI	Deputy of District 20 (Concepción Province)	University for Development	March 11, 2022	March 11, 2030
X	Biobío		Gastón Saavedra	Democratic Socialism	PS	Deputy of District 20 (Concepción Province)	Federico Santa María Technical University	March 11, 2022	March 11, 2030
XVI	Ñuble		Loreto Carvajal	Democratic Socialism	PPD	Deputy of District 19 (Ñuble Region)	Catholic University of the Most Holy Conception	March 3, 2021	March 11, 2030
XVI	Ñuble		Gustavo Sanhueza	Chile Vamos	UDI	Deputy of District 19 (Ñuble Region)	University of the Bío Bío	March 11, 2022	March 11, 2030
XI	Araucanía		Felipe Kast	Chile Vamos	Evópoli	Deputy of former District 22 (Santiago commune)	Pontifical Catholic University of Chile; Harvard University	March 11, 2018	March 11, 2026
XI	Araucanía		José García Ruminot	Chile Vamos	RN	Deputy of former District 50	University of La Frontera	March 11, 2002	March 11, 2026
XI	Araucanía		Carmen Gloria Aravena	Out of pact	PLR	Traiguén municipal administrator	University of La Frontera	March 11, 2018	March 11, 2026
XI	Araucanía		Francisco Huenchumilla	Out of pact	DC	Intendant of the Araucanía Region during Michelle Bachelet's presidency	University of Chile	March 11, 2018	March 11, 2026
XI	Araucanía		Jaime Quintana	Democratic Socialism	PPD	Deputy of former District 49	Pontifical Catholic University of Chile; University of La Frontera	March 11, 2010	March 11, 2026
XII	Los Ríos		Alfonso de Urresti	Democratic Socialism	PS	Deputy of former District 53 (El Ranco province)	University of Chile	March 11, 2014	March 11, 2030
XII	Los Ríos		María José Gatica	Chile Vamos	RN	Provincial Governor of Valdivia during Sebastián Piñera's presidency	Austral University of Chile	March 11, 2022	March 11, 2030
XII	Los Ríos		Iván Flores	Out of pact	DC	Deputy of District 24 (Los Ríos Region)	Austral University of Chile	March 11, 2022	March 11, 2030
XIII	Los Lagos		Iván Moreira	Chile Vamos	UDI	Deputy of former District 27	Luis Alberto Barrera High School, Punta Arenas	March 11, 2014	March 11, 2030
XIII	Los Lagos		Carlos Kuschel	Chile Vamos	RN	Deputy of District 26 (Los Lagos Region)	Austral University of Chile	March 11, 2022	March 11, 2030
XIII	Los Lagos		Fidel Espinoza	Democratic Socialism	PS	Deputy of District 25 (Los Lagos Region)	University of Chile	March 11, 2022	March 11, 2030
XIV	Aysén		David Sandoval	Chile Vamos	UDI	Deputy of former District 59 (Aysén Region)	University of Chile	March 11, 2018	March 11, 2026
XIV	Aysén		Ximena Órdenes	Democratic Socialism	Ind. - PPD	Intendant of the Aysén Region during Michelle Bachelet's presidency	Andrés Bello National University	March 11, 2018	March 11, 2026
XV	Magallanes		Karim Bianchi	Out of pact	Independent	Deputy of District 28 (Magallanes Region)	UNIACC University of Magallanes	March 11, 2022	March 11, 2030
XV	Magallanes		Alejandro Kusanovic	Chile Vamos	Ind. - PSC	President of the Regional Council of Magallanes (2019-2021)	Technical State University of Chile	March 11, 2022	March 11, 2030

== See also ==
- President of the Senate of Chile
- National Congress of Chile
- Chamber of Deputies of Chile
- Politics of Chile
- List of legislatures by country
