= Yasna Provoste =

Chilean politician

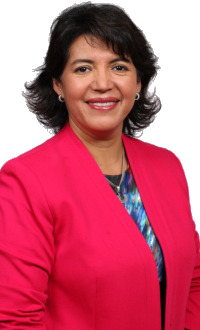

President of the Senate
- In office 17 March 2021 – 25 August 2021
- Preceded by: Adriana Muñoz D'Albora
- Succeeded by: Ximena Rincón

Member of the Senate
- Incumbent
- Assumed office 11 March 2018
- Preceded by: District established
- Constituency: 4th district

Member of the Chamber of Deputies
- In office 11 March 2014 – 11 March 2018
- Preceded by: Giovanni Calderón Bassi
- Succeeded by: District abolished
- Constituency: 6th district

Minister of Education
- In office 14 July 2006 – 3 April 2008
- President: Michelle Bachelet
- Preceded by: Martín Zilic
- Succeeded by: René Cortázar

Minister of Planning
- In office 10 February 2005 – 11 March 2006
- President: Ricardo Lagos
- Preceded by: Position established
- Succeeded by: Clarisa Hardy

Minister of Planning and Cooperation
- In office 1 October 2004 – 10 February 2005
- President: Ricardo Lagos
- Preceded by: Andrés Palma Irarrázaval
- Succeeded by: Position abolished

Intendant of Atacama Region
- In office 26 December 2001 – 30 September 2004
- President: Ricardo Lagos
- Preceded by: Armando Arancibia Calderón
- Succeeded by: Rodrigo Rojas Veas

Governor of Huasco Province
- In office 1997–2001
- President: Eduardo Frei Ruiz-Tagle
- Preceded by: Armando Flores Jiménez

President of the Playa Ancha University Students Federation
- In office 1987–1989
- Preceded by: Omar Jara
- Succeeded by: Rossana Fuentes

Personal details
- Born: 16 December 1969 (age 56) Vallenar, Chile
- Party: Christian Democratic (1983–present)
- Spouse: Mauricio Alberto Olagnier Tijero
- Children: Two
- Parent(s): Carlos Provoste; Nelly Campillay
- Education: Playa Ancha University (BA); Pontifical Xavierian University (MA)
- Occupation: Politician
- Profession: Physical education teacher

Yasna Provoste Campillay (born 16 December 1969) is a Chilean teacher and Christian Democrat politician of Diaguita descent who served as a minister during the presidencies of Ricardo Lagos and Michelle Bachelet. Since 11 March 2018, she has been a senator for the Atacama Region for the period 2018-2026.

In 2008, following the fraudulent activities of civil servant Franka Grez, Provoste faced questioning from parliamentarians of the then-center-right opposition, Alianza por Chile. They criticized her for not being aware of Grez's systematic appropriation and concealment of funds, which occurred between 2004 and 2008. On April 14, the Chilean Senate, by a majority of 20 votes to 18, found her guilty in the «Subsidies Case» (Spanish: Caso Subvenciones), resulting in a loss of over US$600 million. As a consequence, Provoste was disqualified from holding public office for five years. Meanwhile, Grez received a prison sentence of eleven years for embezzlement and diversion of funds to her relatives and close friends, with the estimated amount being CLP 310 million.

After a period of self-imposed exile in Canada from 2008 to 2009, she returned to her hometown of Vallenar. In 2013, she was elected as a deputy for the 6th District of the Atacama Region, and in 2017, she was elected as a senator for the same region. Following the resignation of Adriana Muñoz, she assumed the role of President of the Senate in March 2021. However, Provoste resigned from this position in August 2021 to concentrate on her presidential candidacy, which she lost in the first round.

== Early life ==
Provoste was born in Vallenar in northern Chile to a family of Diaguita descent. At the age of nine she was a national champion in gymnastics, for which she received a scholarship to study at the women's boarding school in Santiago. Back in Vallenar she switched to athletics, becoming a pentathlon champion.

Provoste majored in physical education at the Playa Ancha University of Educational Sciences in Valparaíso. She pursued postgraduate studies in education administration at the same university, and in local government and decentralization in Colombia. During her university years she was twice president of the student board and was a member of the student's federation.

== Political career ==
During the Eduardo Frei Ruiz-Tagle administration Provoste was the director of the National Women's Service in the Atacama Region from 1996 to 1997 and governor of the Huasco Province from 1997 to 2001. During President Ricardo Lagos's tenure she was intendant of the Atacama Region from 2001 to 2004, minister of Planning from 2004 to 2006 and, during Michelle Bachelet's presidency, national executive director of Integra Foundation in 2006 and Minister of Education from 2006 to 2008.

=== Impeachment trial ===
In February 2008, the Office of the General Auditor of the Republic reported that around US$500 million of funds transferred by the Education Ministry to public and subsidized private schools during 2004 to 2008 were not properly accounted for and that nearly US$600 thousand were illegally transferred by Franka Grez to private school managers and her siblings Juan Pablo and Edmundo Grez. There were also reports of financial mismanagement in other areas, as well as duplicate enrollment of thousands of students.

Thus, Provoste was accused by the opposition deputies Iván Moreira and José Antonio Kast, both from the right-wing party Independent Democratic Union, for not correcting these irregularities. They urged members of their coalition to impeach her for violating article 52, number 2, letter b of the Constitution in her capacity as Minister of Education. On 3 April 2008, the Chamber of Deputies suspended her from her position. The Senate then heard her case on 15 April 2008 and voted to impeach her the following day on one out of five counts.

After the impeachment trial, Provoste was immediately removed from her position and was disqualified from office for the next five years. Meanwhile, Franka Grez received an eleven-year prison sentence for having illegally transferred public funds for four years.

Vote details

Chamber of Deputies:

- Admissibility of impeachment against the Minister of Education Yasna Provoste.
  - Yes: 59 (50.9%) [All opposition-party deputies, plus independent deputy Marta Isasi, and former Christian Democrat members Alejandra Sepúlveda, Jaime Mulet, Eduardo Díaz del Río and Carlos Olivares.]
  - No: 55 (47.4%) [All Concertación deputies, except Christian Democrat deputies Gabriel Ascencio and Pablo Lorenzini, Party for Democracy deputy René Alinco, and Socialist deputy Laura Soto.]
  - Abstention: 2 (1.7%) [Concertación deputies René Alinco and Pablo Lorenzini.]
  - Not present: 3 [Former Christian Democrat member Pedro Araya Guerrero, Christian Democrat deputy Gabriel Ascencio and former Party for Democracy member Esteban Valenzuela.]
  - Barred from voting: 1 [Socialist deputy Laura Soto.]

Senate:

- Count 1: Not correcting the grave infringements and irregularities committed by Ministerial Secretary of Education of the Santiago Metropolitan Region in the handling of public funds.
  - Yes: 20 (52.6%) [Votes by senators from the opposition parties Independent Democratic Union and National Renewal, by former Concertación senators Fernando Flores and Adolfo Zaldívar, and by independent senator Carlos Bianchi.]
  - No: 18 (47.4%) [Votes by senators from the governing Concertación coalition.]
  - Abstention: 0 (0.0%)
  - Result: Approved.
- Count 2: Not applying sanctions in the cases of grave infractions to the subsidizing law.
  - Yes: 19 (50.0%) [Same as Count 1, minus Bianchi.]
  - No: 19 (50.0%) [Same as Count 1, plus Bianchi.]
  - Abstention: 0 (0.0%)
  - Result: Rejected.
- Count 3: Not dismissing the Ministerial Secretary of Education of the Santiago Metropolitan Region, who was administratively responsible for the grave infractions and irregularities.
  - Yes: 4 (10.5%) [Four opposition-party senators.]
  - No: 34 (89.5%)
  - Abstention: 0 (0.0%)
  - Result: Rejected.
- Count 4: Ignoring the results and recommendations of audits that revealed the very grave irregularities committed in different programs and regions of the country.
  - Yes: 14 (36.8%) [Thirteen opposition-party senators, plus Zaldívar.]
  - No: 24 (63.2%)
  - Abstention: 0 (0.0%)
  - Result: Rejected.
- Count 5: Providing inaccurate or intentionally incomplete information to the public opinion and to the Chamber of Deputies, thus violating the principle of administrative probity.
  - Yes: 3 (7.9%) [Three opposition-party senators.]
  - No: 34 (89.5%)
  - Abstention: 1 (2.6%) [Former Concertación senator Fernando Flores.]
  - Result: Rejected.

=== Post-impeachment life ===
Shortly after her impeachment Provoste moved to Canada to study. On 15 October 2008 she filed a suit against the Chilean state before the Inter-American Commission on Human Rights.

Provoste returned to Chile in mid-2009, residing in Vallenar. In November 2010 she was elected president of the Christian Democrat Party in the Atacama Region with 80% of the vote, allowing her to be part of the party's National Council.

== Return to politics ==
In mid-2013, she secured her party's nomination as a candidate for deputy for the 6th district in the parliamentary elections of that year. In the election, she was elected with 43.86% of the vote (16,694 valid ballots), obtaining the highest number of votes in the district, which enabled the New Majority coalition to secure a "double win" alongside the social democrat Alberto Robles.

She took office as a deputy on 11 March 2014. In July of that same year, she obtained the highest vote in the national council elections of her party.

Provoste served on the standing committees on Education; Mining and Energy; Water Resources and Desertification (serving as chair from March 2015); and Ethics and Transparency. She was also a member of the Investigative Committee on irregularities affecting the National Mining Company (Enami).

In 2017, she was elected as a senator for the same region, taking office in March 2018. On 17 March 2021, Provoste became President of the Senate of Chile following the resignation of Adriana Muñoz.

Her leadership was marked by a conciliatory yet firm tone during a period of political fragmentation and constitutional debate. Provoste's tenure strengthened her national prominence and paved the way for her subsequent presidential bid later that same year.

== Presidential race ==
On 23 July 2021, Provoste officially launched her presidential candidacy in her hometown of Vallenar. She stated that she was willing to participate in any open and democratic mechanism to represent the centre-left.

Her coalition, Constituent Unity, organized a citizen consultation that included Paula Narváez of the Socialist Party and Carlos Maldonado of the Radical Party. On 21 August 2021, Provoste won the nomination by a wide margin and became the official presidential candidate of the coalition.

Following her victory, she resigned from the presidency of the Senate on 24 August to focus on her campaign. Her platform emphasized dialogue, equality, and democratic renewal amid political fragmentation.

In the general election held on 21 November 2021, Provoste finished fifth with 815,558 votes (11.61%). According to analysts, part of her centrist electorate shifted toward Franco Parisi's candidacy.

== See also ==
- List of female Chilean presidential candidates
