= Vodanovic =

Vodanovic or Vodanović is a surname. Notable people with the surname include:

- Antonio Vodanovic (born 1949), Chilean television presenter
- Hernán Vodanovic (1946–2025), Chilean politician
- Maja Vodanovic (born 1968), Croatian-born Canadian artist, teacher, and politician
- Paulina Vodanovic (born 1971), Chilean politician
- Sergio Vodanović (1926–2001), Croatian–Chilean lawyer, journalist, dramatist, and television writer
