= Commission for the Environment =

The Commission for the Environment may refer to:

- New Zealand Commission for the Environment
- Central American Commission for the Environment and Development, a participating organization in the Global Earth Observation System of Systems
- National Commission for the Environment, see Sara Larraín

== See also ==
- Commissioner for the Environment
