= Toloza =

Toloza is a surname. Notable people with the surname include:

- Daniela Toloza (born 1994), Colombian model and beauty pageant titleholder
- Edison Toloza (born 1984), Colombian footballer
- Franco Toloza (born 1994), Argentine footballer
- Juan Toloza (born 1985), Chilean footballer
- Pablo Toloza (born 1971), Chilean lawyer and politician
- Rodrigo Toloza (born 1984), Chilean footballer
- Samuel Toloza (born 1979), Salvadoran special forces soldier
- Santiago Toloza (born 2002), Argentine footballer
