= Cristian Leay =

Chilean politician

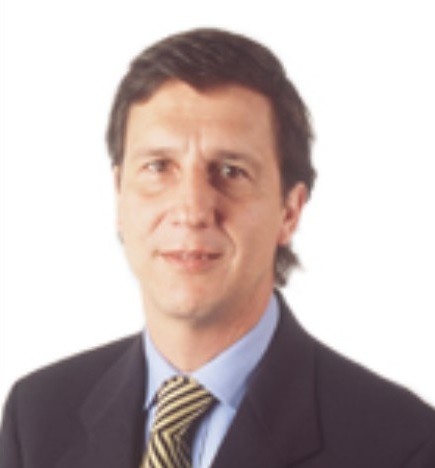

Member of the Chamber of Deputies of Chile
- In office 11 March 1990 – 11 March 2006
- Preceded by: Creation of the Office
- Succeeded by: Claudia Nogueira

Personal details
- Born: 9 February 1954 (age 72) Recoleta, Santiago, Chile
- Party: Renovación Nacional (RN); Independent Democratic Union (UDI)
- Spouse(s): María Inés Cabrera (1980–2013)
- Children: Six
- Parent(s): Enrique Leay; Isabel Morán
- Education: Universidad Técnica del Estado
- Occupation: Politician
- Profession: Engineer

Cristian Antonio Leay Morán (born 9 February 1954) is a Chilean mining engineer, politician and businessman, former deputy, and former member of the board of directors of Televisión Nacional de Chile.

== Biography ==
He completed his primary and secondary studies at the Patrocinio San José School. He completed his higher education at the Universidad Técnica del Estado, graduating in 1977 with a degree in mining engineering.

During his time at the university, he was president of the School of Mines Student Center, and assumed the position of general secretary of the Student Federation of his university in 1973. Three years later he was elected president of the Student Federation of the same university. In the mid 80's he contributed to the formation of the National Renewal Party, occupying the position of president of said party in District 19 (Recoleta and Independencia) in 1987.

In 1989 he joined the Independent Democratic Union, where he served as regional secretary of the Metropolitan youth, advisor to the Population Department, regional president of the party, and member of the Political Commission.

In his first and second parliamentary terms, he participated in the Permanent Commission of Mining and Energy, which he chaired. He was appointed Head of the UDI Caucus, for the period 1993 to 1994. In his third and fourth parliamentary term, he was a member of the Permanent Commission on Foreign Relations, Interparliamentary Affairs and Latin American Integration and the Committee on Mining and Energy.

In 2005 he ran for the Senate, being surpassed by his fellow candidate, Carlos Cantero, by 1%. In subsequent years he served as director of Televisión Nacional de Chile (2008–2016) and president of the board of directors, general manager, partner and advisor to mining companies.
