= Adolfo Zaldívar =

Chilean politician

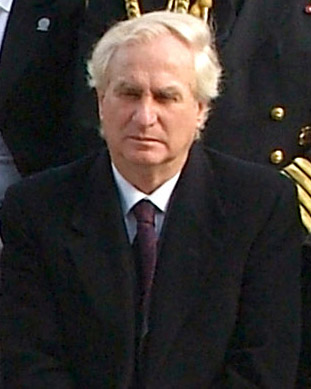

Ambassador of Chile to Argentina
- In office 16 April 2010 – 27 February 2013
- President: Sebastián Piñera
- Preceded by: Miguel Otero Lathrop
- Succeeded by: Milenko Skoknic

President of the Senate of Chile
- In office 12 March 2008 – 13 March 2009
- Preceded by: Eduardo Frei Ruiz-Tagle
- Succeeded by: Jovino Novoa

President of the Independent Regionalist Party
- In office 2009–2010
- Preceded by: Jaime Mulet
- Succeeded by: Eduardo Díaz del Río

President of the Christian Democratic Party
- In office 2002–2006
- Preceded by: Ricardo Hormazábal
- Succeeded by: Soledad Alvear

Member of the Senate
- In office 11 March 1994 – 11 March 2010
- Preceded by: Hernán Vodanovic
- Succeeded by: Patricio Walker
- Constituency: Aysén Region

Personal details
- Born: 13 September 1943 Santiago, Chile
- Died: February 27, 2013 (aged 69) Santiago, Chile
- Resting place: Parque del Recuerdo
- Party: PRI (2009–2010)
- Other political affiliations: PDC (1957–2007)
- Spouse: María Alicia Larraín
- Children: 8
- Education: Pontifical Catholic University of Chile (LL.B)
- Occupation: Lawyer

Miguel Adolfo Gerardo Zaldívar Larraín (13 September 1943 – 27 February 2013) was a Chilean politician and lawyer. He was senator for Aisén and from March 2008 until his death in February 2013 he had been President of the Chilean Senate. He was an historic member of the Christian Democratic Party, leading its right-wing faction until his expulsion from the political party in December 2007.

Zaldívar was married to María Alicia Larraín Shaux and had six children. He was the brother of former President of the Senate of Chile and Interior Minister Andrés Zaldívar.

Lawyer and politician of the Christian Democratic Party. He served as Senator for the 18th Senatorial Constituency, Aysén Region, between 1994 and 2006, and was President of the Christian Democratic Party for two consecutive terms between 2002 and 2006. He was also Ambassador of Chile to Argentina between 2009 and 2010.

== Biography ==
=== Family and youth ===
He was born on 13 September 1943. He was the seventh child of Alberto Zaldívar Errázuriz and Josefina Larraín Tejeda. He was the brother of former minister and senator Andrés Zaldívar Larraín and former deputy Alberto Zaldívar Larraín. He was the father of María José Zaldívar, Minister of Labour and Social Security during the second government of President Sebastián Piñera. He was also the uncle of María Carolina Schmidt Zaldívar, former Minister Director of the National Women's Service, former Minister of Education, and Minister of the Environment during the governments of Sebastián Piñera.

He was married to María Alicia Larraín Chaux and was the father of eight children.

=== Professional career ===
He completed his secondary education at the Instituto Alonso de Ercilla (Marist Brothers) and at the Instituto de Humanidades Luis Campino. He later entered the Faculty of Legal, Political and Social Sciences of the Pontifical Catholic University of Chile, where he earned a licentiate degree in Legal and Social Sciences with the thesis El tributo frente a la constitución. He subsequently qualified as a lawyer.

In his professional activity, he was a partner at the law firm Irureta, Zaldívar, Briones y Hernández and practiced law independently. In parallel, he served as Professor of Political Law and Constitutional Law at the Faculty of Legal and Social Sciences of the University of Chile. He was also a co-founder of the Chilean Human Rights Commission, where he stood out for his support of individuals affected during the military regime of Augusto Pinochet. Between 1985 and 1988, he served as president of the Chilean–Argentine Political Integration Forum.

== Political career ==
At the age of fourteen, he joined the Christian Democratic Party, where his brothers were already members. In 1965, during his university years, he served as National University Leader of the party. He was later elected National Councillor of the party's Youth between 1970 and 1972. The following year, he was appointed National Head of Lawyers of the party, a position he held until 1980. Subsequently, between 1983 and 1989, he was a member of the Oversight Commission, served as National Councillor between 1983 and 1990, and as First National Vice President in 1993 and 1997. In 1992, he served as Second Vice President of the party.

During the military regime, he was one of the first lawyers to file recursos de amparo in cases involving human rights violations. He also proposed the need to negotiate with the military government and to hold a plebiscite to restore democracy. He later led the Christian Democratic faction known as "los colorines," a nickname derived from his hair color, which grew under his leadership during the 1990s.

In the 1989 elections, he ran as a candidate for Senator for the 3rd Senatorial Constituency, Atacama Region, but was not elected, despite obtaining the second-highest vote with 30,933 ballots, representing 28.44% of the valid votes cast. In 1993, he again ran for the Senate, this time for the 18th Senatorial Constituency, Aysén Region, for the 1994–2002 term. He was elected with 11,480 votes, equivalent to 29.53% of the valid votes. He was re-elected for the same constituency in the 2001 elections, obtaining 11,302 votes, corresponding to 30.15% of the valid votes.

Between 2002 and 2006, for two consecutive terms, he served as President of the Christian Democratic Party.

In 2005, he was a presidential pre-candidate of the Christian Democratic Party but was defeated in the internal elections of the National Council by candidate Soledad Alvear. During the campaign, the press referred to his list as "los colorines," alluding to his hair color.

After more than fifty years of membership in the Christian Democratic Party, on 27 December 2007 the party's Supreme Tribunal decided to expel him by eleven votes to three. He was also removed from the party's records due to his conduct in Congress on issues considered sensitive for the coalition, particularly regarding the financing of the Transantiago public transport system.

Along with him, five other parliamentarians left the party: Jaime Mulet, Carlos Olivares, Alejandra Sepúlveda, Eduardo Díaz del Río, and Pedro Araya Guerrero. They later joined the Regionalist Party of Independents.

In 2009, he joined the Regionalist Party of Independents and in January of that year announced his candidacy for the presidential elections to be held in December. He ultimately withdrew due to low public support. For the parliamentary elections of December 2009, he decided not to seek re-election to the Senate.

In 2009, he assumed the presidency of the Regionalist Party of Independents, a position he held until June 2010, when he resigned upon accepting his appointment as Ambassador of Chile to Argentina by President Sebastián Piñera, following the resignation of Miguel Otero.

He died on 27 February 2013 in Santiago. The government decreed two days of official mourning.
