= List of female Chilean presidential candidates =

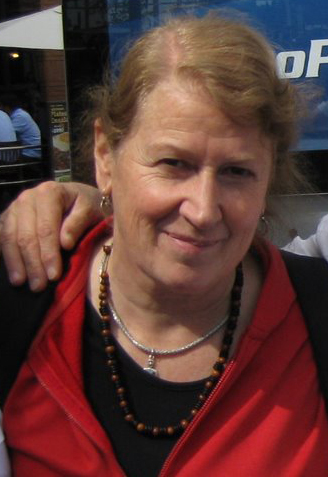
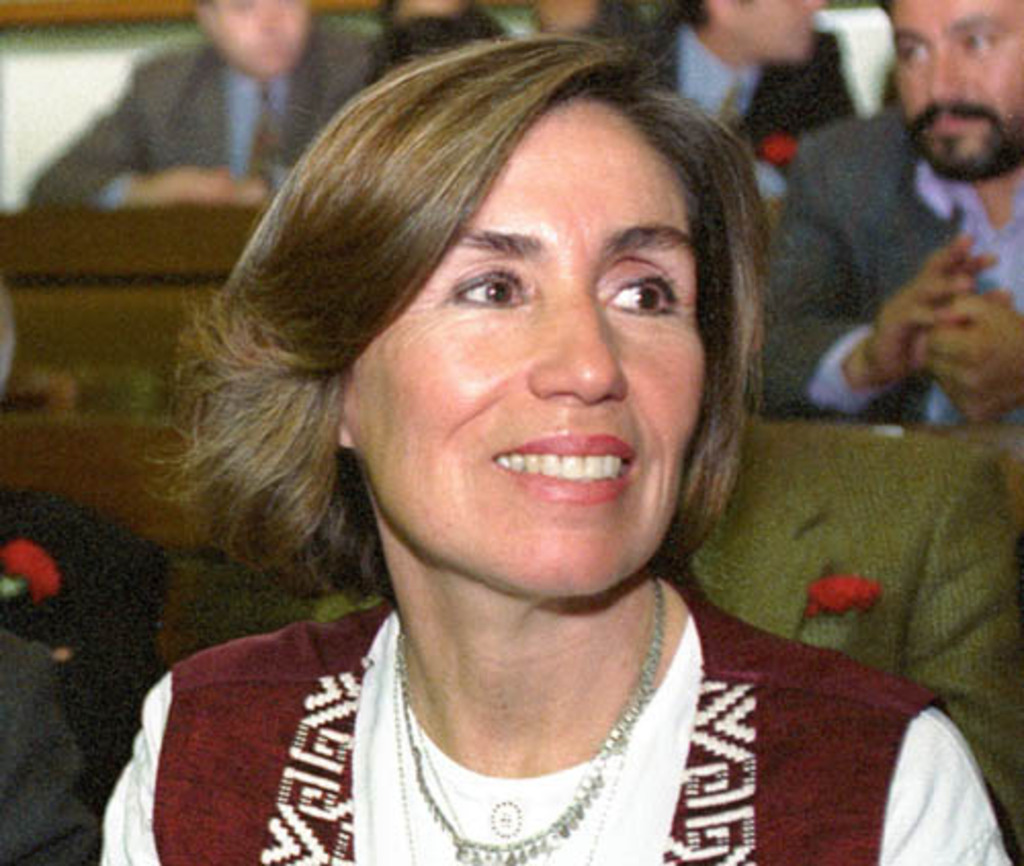
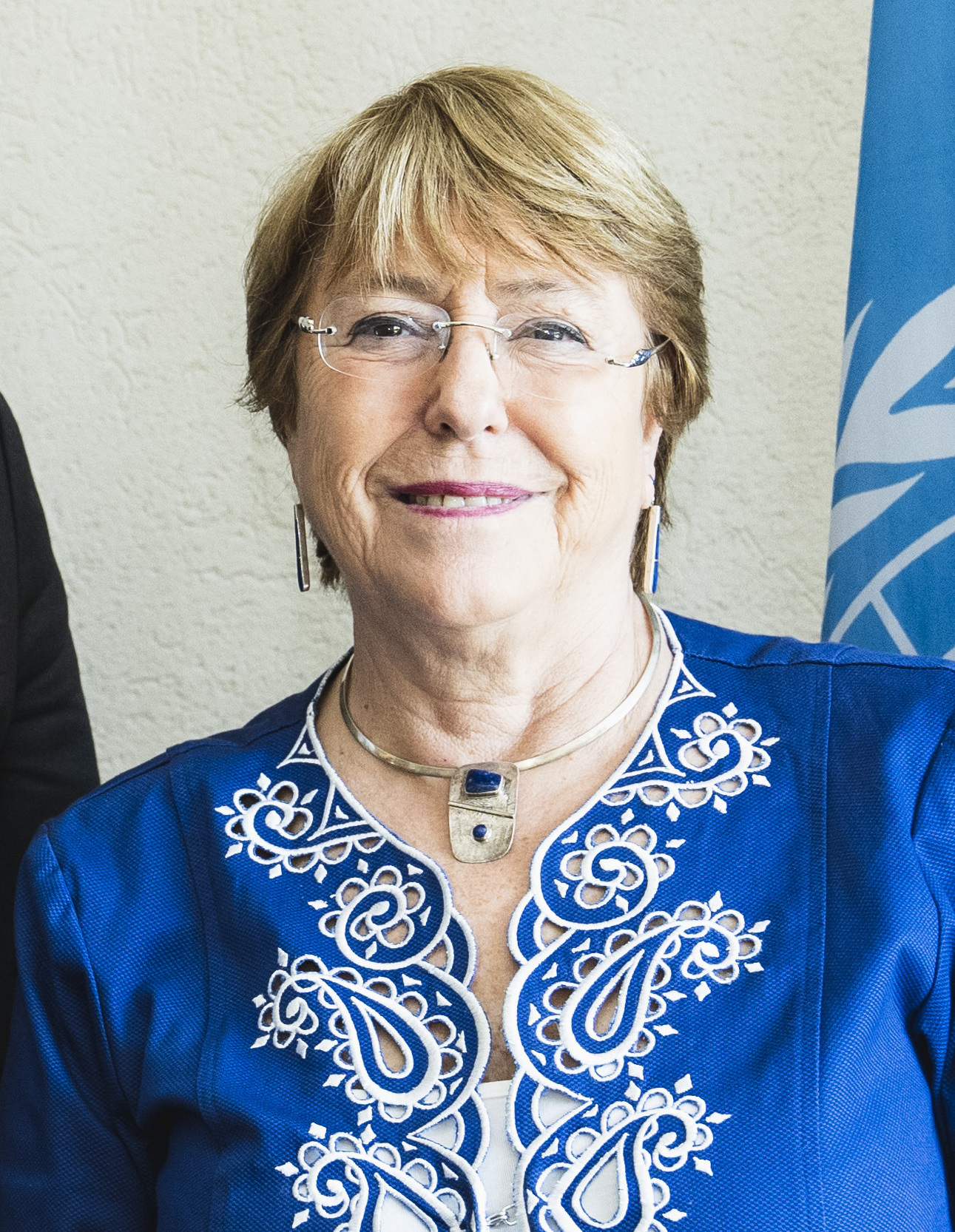
- Left and center: Sara Larraín and Gladys Marín are the first female candidates to contest the first round of a presidential election in Chile.
- Right: Michelle Bachelet became the country's first female president in 2005 and was re-elected in 2013.

The following is a list of female presidential candidates in Chile who have either participated in primary or general elections. Candidates may be nominated or selected by political parties or coalitions, or run as independents after collecting the minimum number of required signatures as established by the electoral authority, SERVEL.

Between the 1952 presidential election —the first to include women's suffrage— and the 2025 presidential election, ten women have participated in at least the first round of voting. That number rises to eleven if primary elections are included.

Listed below are women who have reached at least a primary election.

== History ==
=== 20th century ===
- Sara Larraín and Gladys Marín became the first female candidates to contest the first round of a presidential election in 1999–2000. Marín also became the first Communist party presidential candidate in Chile since 1932.

=== 21st century ===
- Michelle Bachelet became the first female Socialist party presidential candidate in Chile, the first woman to win the first round of a presidential election, and the country's first female president, elected in the 2005–06 Chilean general election. In the 2013 Chilean general election, she became the first person to be re-elected president since Carlos Ibáñez del Campo in 1952.
- Evelyn Matthei became the first conservative female presidential candidate in Chile and advanced to the runuoff against Bachelet in the 2013 election. This marked the first-ever runoff contested by two women in Latin America history. In the 2025 general election, she finished in fifth out of eight candidates, representing the centre-right coalition Chile Vamos.
- Roxana Miranda ran as the candidate for the left-wing Equality Party. She received 81,873 votes (1.24%), finishing in seventh out of nine candidates in the first round.
- Beatriz Sánchez became the first presidential candidate from the Broad Front party. She received 1,338,037 votes (20.27%), finishing third out of eight candidates in the first round.
- Carolina Goic became the first female presidential candidate from the Christian Democratic Party. She received 387,784 votes (5.88%), finishing fifth out of eight candidates in the first round.
- Yasna Provoste ran as the presidential candidate for the centre-left New Social Pact coalition in the 2021 general election, after winning the non-SERVEL-observed primary. She received 815,563 votes (11.60%), finishing fifth out of seven candidates in the first round.
- Paula Narváez ran as the Socialist Party's presidential candidate in the primary election held by New Social Pact coalition for the 2021 general election. She was defeated by Christian Democrat Senator Yasna Provoste.
- Carolina Tohá ran as the Democratic Socialism presidential candidate in the primary election held by the centre-left Unity for Chile coalition for the 2025 general election. She received 385,948 votes (28.07%), finishing second out of four candidates.
- Jeannette Jara became the presidential candidate for the centre-left Unity for Chile coalition after winning the primary in June 2025. She narrowly won the first round, becoming the first Communist and the second woman to do so, and advanced to the runoff held the following month eventually losing against José Antonio Kast.

== Presidential candidates ==
=== General election candidates by popular vote ===
Year	Picture	Name	Party	Coalition	Round	Votes	%	Elected president
2005		Michelle Bachelet	Socialist Party (PS)	Coalition of Parties for Democracy	Runoff	3,723,019	53.50	Michelle Bachelet
2013		Michelle Bachelet	Socialist Party (PS)	New Majority	Runoff	3,470,379	62.17	Michelle Bachelet
2005		Michelle Bachelet	Socialist Party (PS)	Coalition of Parties for Democracy	First round	3,190,691	45.96	Michelle Bachelet
2013		Michelle Bachelet	Socialist Party (PS)	New Majority	First round	3,075,839	46.70	Michelle Bachelet
2013		Evelyn Matthei	Independent Democratic Union (UDI)	Alliance	Runoff	2,111,891	37.83	Michelle Bachelet
2013		Evelyn Matthei	Independent Democratic Union (UDI)	Alliance	First round	1,648,481	25.03	Michelle Bachelet
2025		Evelyn Matthei	Independent Democratic Union (UDI)	Chile Vamos	First round	1,613,797	12.48	José Antonio Kast
2017		Beatriz Sánchez	Independent	Broad Front	First round	1,338,037	20.27	Sebastián Piñera
2021		Yasna Provoste	Christian Democratic Party (PDC)	New Social Pact	First round	815,563	11.60	Gabriel Boric
2017		Carolina Goic	Christian Democratic Party (PDC)	None	First round	387,784	5.88	Sebastián Piñera
1999		Gladys Marín	Comunist Party (PCCh)	The Left	First round	225,224	3.19	Ricardo Lagos
2013		Roxana Miranda	Equality Party	None	First round	81,873	1.24	Michelle Bachelet
1999		Sara Larraín	Independent	None	First round	31,319	0.44	Ricardo Lagos
2025		Jeannette Jara	Comunist Party (PC)	Unity for Chile	First round	3,476,615	26.85	José Antonio Kast
2025		Jeannette Jara	Comunist Party (PC)	Unity for Chile	Runoff	5,218,444	41.84	José Antonio Kast

== See also ==
- Women in Chile
- President of Chile
- Presidents of Chile timeline
- List of female cabinet ministers of Chile
