= Sofía Cid =

Chilean politician

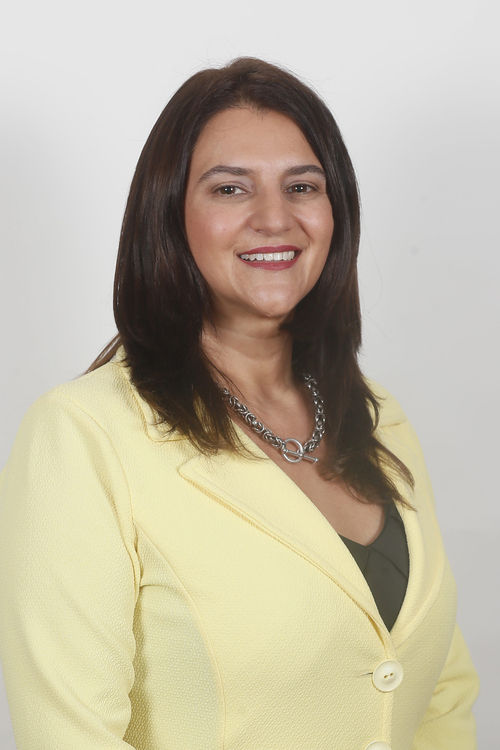
- Cid in 2022

Member of the Chamber of Deputies
- In office 11 March 2018 – 11 March 2026
- Constituency: District 4

Regional Counselor of Copiapó Province
- In office 11 March 2014 – 21 July 2016
- President: Michelle Bachelet

Regional ministerial secretary of Finance
- In office 11 March 2010 – 11 August 2013
- President: Sebastián Piñera

Personal details
- Born: September 29, 1971 (age 54) Copiapó
- Party: National Renewal
- Spouse: Joshua Lee Johnnes Swaneck Cortés
- Children: Two
- Parent(s): Juan Cid Estefan; Clara Versalovic Calcagno

Sofía Slovena Cid Versalovic (born 9 September 1971) is a Chilean politician and current member of the Chamber of Deputies of Chile.

== Biography ==
Cid was born in Copiapó on 29 September 1971. She is the daughter of Juan Cid Estefan and Clara Versalovic Calcagno. She is married to Joshua Lee Johnnes Swaneck Cortés and has two children.

She completed her primary education at Liceo Sagrado Corazón in Copiapó and her secondary education at Liceo Católico de Atacama.

She later moved to Santiago to pursue higher education, graduating as a commercial engineer with a specialization in economics. Her undergraduate thesis for the degree of Licentiate in Economic and Administrative Sciences was titled “Relationship between economic growth and poverty levels.”

Professionally, she worked for more than 15 years in the private sector. Among other positions, she served in management roles at Atacama Lodge Hotel.

== Political career ==
She began her political and public involvement through student leadership bodies at her school and through participation in school community activities.

On 11 March 2010, she assumed office as Regional Ministerial Secretary of Economy for the Atacama Region, a position she held until August 2013, when she resigned in order to run for a seat on the Regional Council of Atacama representing Copiapó.

In the first elections for Regional Councillors, held on 17 November 2013, she ran as a candidate for Regional Councillor for Copiapó representing the Independent Democratic Union. She was elected with 3,029 votes (the second-highest vote total), corresponding to 7.03% of the valid votes cast.

As a Regional Councillor of Atacama, she served on the Infrastructure and Productive Development Committee; the Science and Technology Committee, which she chaired; the Territorial Planning and Land-Use Committee; and the Investment Committee.

On 21 July 2016, she submitted her resignation from the position of Regional Councillor of Atacama in order to run for mayor of Copiapó as an independent candidate. She obtained 6,668 votes, equivalent to 17.08% of the valid votes cast, but was not elected.

In 2017, she undertook a new political challenge by seeking a seat in the Chamber of Deputies of Chile. In August of that year, she registered her candidacy representing National Renewal for the 4th District, which comprises the communes of Chañaral, Diego de Almagro, Copiapó, Caldera, Tierra Amarilla, Vallenar, Freirina, Huasco, and Alto del Carmen in the Atacama Region. She was elected with 13,325 votes, equivalent to 14.21% of the valid votes cast.

In the internal elections of National Renewal held on 19 June 2021, she joined the list led by Senator Francisco Chahuán and was elected vice president of the party.

In August 2021, she presented her candidacy for re-election in the 4th District of the Atacama Region, representing National Renewal within the Chile Podemos Más coalition. In November, she was re-elected with 5,040 votes, corresponding to 5.10% of the valid votes cast.

In 2025, she joined the Republican Party of Chile.

She was a candidate for the Senate representing the 4th Senatorial District of the Atacama Region on behalf of the Republican Party within the Cambio por Chile coalition in the parliamentary elections held on 16 November 2025. She was not elected, obtaining 21,872 votes, corresponding to 11.95% of the total votes cast.
