= Felipe Valenzuela Herrera =

Chilean politician

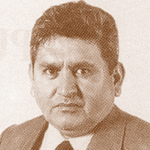
- Valenzuela in 1990

Member of the Chamber of Deputies
- In office 11 March 1990 – 11 March 2002
- Preceded by: District created
- Succeeded by: Carlos Cantero
- Constituency: 4th District (Antofagasta, Mejillones, Sierra Gorda and Taltal)

Personal details
- Born: 8 October 1941 (age 84) Arica, Chile
- Party: Party for Democracy (1988–2008); Socialist Party (1969–present)
- Education: University of Chile (LL.B)
- Occupation: Politician
- Profession: Lawyer

Felipe Valenzuela Herrera (born 8 October 1941) is a Chilean politician and lawyer who is member of the Senate of Chile.

In 1983 he co-founded the Human Rights Commission of Antofagasta, serving as its Secretary General. He was a member of the Democratic Alliance in Antofagasta and served as regional secretary of his party in the region. In 1985 he was appointed regional president of the Teachers’ Association. In 1986 he served as political head of the National Brigade of Socialist Teachers.

== Biography ==
He was born in Arica on 8 October 1941, the son of Felipe Alberto Valenzuela and Ana Rosa Herrera. He married María Araos Varela and is the father of four children.

He completed his primary studies at School No. 1 in his hometown and his secondary education at the Escuela Normal de Antofagasta.

After finishing school, he entered the Faculty of Law of the University of Chile. He was sworn in as a lawyer before the Supreme Court of Chile on 24 January 1977. Earlier, in 1960, he had obtained the title of Profesor Normalista (teacher training degree).

Professionally, he worked as a music teacher at the Girls’ High School of Antofagasta and later joined the Antofagasta Symphony Orchestra. He has also served as legal advisor in various public and private institutions.

== Political career ==
He began his political trajectory when he was elected president of the Alumni Center of the Escuela Normal de Antofagasta.

In 1969 he joined the Socialist Party of Chile. During the government of the Popular Unity, he was a grassroots leader at the República Argentina School, where he also served as principal.

In 1988 he became regional president of the Party for Democracy (PPD) in his area, a party of which he was one of the founders and its first provincial president.

In the first parliamentary elections after the return to democracy, in December 1989, he was elected deputy for District No. 4 (Antofagasta, Mejillones, Sierra Gorda and Taltal), II Region, for the 1990–1994 term, obtaining 40,124 votes (33.54%). In 1993 he was re-elected for the 1994–1998 term with 31,799 votes (27.45%). In 1997 he was again re-elected for the 1998–2002 term, obtaining the highest majority in the district with 31,556 votes (31.40%).

In the 2001 parliamentary elections he ran again for re-election but was not elected. After completing his term as parliamentarian, he returned to the practice of his profession.
