= Giovanni Calderón Bassi =

Chilean politician

Giovanni Calderón
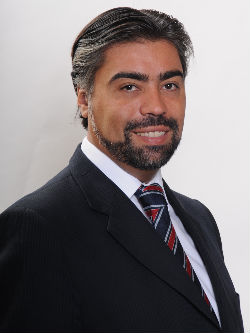

Member of the Chamber of Deputies
- In office 11 March 2010 – 11 March 2014
- Preceded by: Jaime Mulet
- Succeeded by: Yasna Provoste
- Constituency: 6th District

Personal details
- Born: 8 July 1971 (age 55) Vallenar, Chile
- Party: Unión Demócrata Independiente
- Spouse: Pamela Puente
- Education: Pontifical Catholic University of Valparaíso (LL.B)
- Occupation: Politician
- Profession: Lawyer

Giovanni Óscar Calderón Bassi (born 8 July 1971) is a Chilean politician, lawyer and political commentator. Similarly, he has been columnist of La Tercera.

He is a member of the Independent Democratic Union (UDI) party. From March 2002 to March 2010, he coordinated the Secretariat of the Committee of Senators of that political group.

Since November 2006 to the present, he has served as a prosecuting attorney representing the UDI in cases related to lack of probity in Public Administration. He has also provided legal counsel to the party on the same matters.

== Early life ==
He completed his primary education at Elliane College between 1976 and 1977, and at the Public School D-63 República de Colombia, in Santiago, from 1978 to 1982. He finished his secondary education at the Instituto Nacional José Miguel Carrera in 1988.

He pursued higher education at the Pontifical Catholic University of Valparaíso, graduating in 1999 with a Bachelor of Laws (LL.B) in Legal Sciences. His thesis was titled Advances in the Criminal Protection of Personal Liberty in the New Spanish Penal Code and Reference to Chilean Legislation.

In 2002, he took the course Contemporary Legal Thought at the University of Los Andes. Since 2003 to the present, he has been enrolled in the Doctorate in Law program at the Pontifical Catholic University of Chile.

In the professional field, from 1994 to 1996, he served as a teaching assistant in Criminal Law at the PUCV. Simultaneously, in 1995, he worked as a legislative advisor to Deputy Sergio Correa de la Cerda, and until 2002, he held the same position with Senator Beltrán Urenda.

In 1996, he carried out his professional internship in the civil section of the Legal Aid Corporation of Viña del Mar.

In the academic field, between 2000 and 2002, he was a teaching assistant in Introduction to Law at Finis Terrae University. From 2000 to 2001, he was also a teaching assistant in the same subject at the Law School of the Maritime University (UM) of Chile.

From 2002 to 2006, he was a full professor of Criminal Law at the UM. In 2007, he taught General Theory of Punishable Conduct at Andrés Bello National University.

== Political career ==
In 2009, Calderón Bassi was elected Deputy for the 6th District for the period 2010−2012.

In the chamber, he was a member of the permanent Commissions of Constitution, Legislation and Justice and Citizen Security and Drugs. Similarly, Calderón Bassi was a member of the Investigative Commissions on the Expenditure of Public Funds assigned to NGOs during 2006−2010, on Citizen Security during the 2010 Chilean earthquake and on the «Bombs Case».
