= District 4 (Chamber of Deputies of Chile) =

Electoral district of the Chamber of Deputies of Chile

- Distrito 4
- Electoral District for the Chamber of Deputies
- Location of District 4 within Chile
- Region: Atacama
- Population: 286,168 (2017)
- Electorate: 242,779 (2021)
- Area: 75,650 km^{2} (2020)

Current Electoral District
- Created: 2017
- Seats: 5 (2017–present)
- Deputies: List: Daniella Cicardini (PS); Sofía Cid (Ind); Jaime Mulet (FREVS); Juan Santana (PS); Cristian Tapia (Ind)

District 4 (Spanish: Distrito 4) is one of the 28 multi-member electoral districts of the Chamber of Deputies, the lower house of the National Congress, the national legislature of Chile. The district was created by the 2015 electoral reform and came into being at the following general election in 2017. It is conterminous with the region of Atacama. The district currently elects five of the 155 members of the Chamber of Deputies using the open party-list proportional representation electoral system. At the 2021 general election the district had 242,779 registered electors.

== Electoral system ==
District 4 currently elects five of the 155 members of the Chamber of Deputies using the open party-list proportional representation electoral system. Parties may form electoral pacts with each other to pool their votes and increase their chances of winning seats. However, the number of candidates nominated by an electoral pact may not exceed the maximum number of candidates that a single party may nominate. Seats are allocated using the D'Hondt method.

== Election results ==
=== Summary ===
Election	Apruebo Dignidad AD / FA			Green Ecologists PEV			Dignidad Ahora DA			New Social Pact NPS / NM			Democratic Convergence CD			Chile Vamos Podemos / Vamos			Party of the People PDG			Christian Social Front FSC		
Election	Votes	%	Seats	Votes	%	Seats	Votes	%	Seats	Votes	%	Seats	Votes	%	Seats	Votes	%	Seats	Votes	%	Seats	Votes	%	Seats
2021	20,193	20.45%	1	4,019	4.07%	0	2,689	2.72%	0	37,870	38.35%	3				15,000	15.19%	1	9,061	9.18%	0	5,681	5.75%	0
2017	10,725	11.44%	0							33,965	36.22%	2	4,470	4.77%	0	28,230	30.11%	2						

=== Detailed ===
==== 2021 ====
Results of the 2021 general election held on 21 November 2021:

Party		Pact	Party												Pact		
Party		Pact	Votes per commune									Total votes	%	Seats	Votes	%	Seats
Party		Pact	Alto del Carmen	Cal- dera	Chaña- ral	Copi- apó	Diego de Al- magro	Frei- rina	Huas- co	Tierra Ama- rilla	Valle- nar	Total votes	%	Seats	Votes	%	Seats
Socialist Party of Chile	PS	New Social Pact	353	1,516	1,207	15,597	975	901	822	1,682	6,573	29,626	30.00%	2	37,870	38.35%	3
Party for Democracy	PPD	New Social Pact	225	90	71	951	42	202	185	160	4,423	6,349	6.43%	1	37,870	38.35%	3
Radical Party of Chile	PR	New Social Pact	19	46	43	340	20	93	615	20	110	1,306	1.32%	0	37,870	38.35%	3
Christian Democratic Party	PDC	New Social Pact	2	43	49	365	23	19	21	13	54	589	0.60%	0	37,870	38.35%	3
Social Green Regionalist Federation	FREVS	Apruebo Dignidad	327	1,115	323	3,084	313	353	491	436	2,231	8,673	8.78%	1	20,193	20.45%	1
Comunes	COM	Apruebo Dignidad	20	299	93	4,725	74	25	73	167	431	5,907	5.98%	0	20,193	20.45%	1
Communist Party of Chile	PC	Apruebo Dignidad	40	377	270	3,508	479	116	113	342	368	5,613	5.68%	0	20,193	20.45%	1
National Renewal	RN	Chile Podemos +	198	395	185	4,029	97	100	113	256	1,225	6,598	6.68%	1	15,000	15.19%	1
Independent Democratic Union	UDI	Chile Podemos +	78	473	358	3,857	139	185	203	290	970	6,553	6.64%	0	15,000	15.19%	1
Democratic Independent Regionalist Party	PRI	Chile Podemos +	25	483	58	988	36	21	45	111	82	1,849	1.87%	0	15,000	15.19%	1
Party of the People	PDG		110	561	410	4,758	1,452	129	316	428	897	9,061	9.18%	0	9,061	9.18%	0
Republican Party	REP	Christian Social Front	76	369	182	3,807	184	68	146	224	625	5,681	5.75%	0	5,681	5.75%	0
Sebastian Vicente Carmona Orquera (Independent)	Ind		60	312	160	2,842	163	54	162	188	292	4,233	4.29%	0	4,233	4.29%	0
Green Ecologist Party	PEV		68	365	1,003	1,895	145	55	87	124	277	4,019	4.07%	0	4,019	4.07%	0
Equality Party	IGUAL	Dignidad Ahora	117	99	59	1,199	54	53	95	109	375	2,160	2.19%	0	2,689	2.72%	0
Humanist Party	PH	Dignidad Ahora	7	23	17	379	20	10	10	27	36	529	0.54%	0	2,689	2.72%	0
Valid votes			1,725	6,566	4,488	52,324	4,216	2,384	3,497	4,577	18,969	98,746	100.00%	5	98,746	100.00%	5
Blank votes			136	360	224	1,615	225	182	236	262	518	3,758	3.51%				
Rejected votes – other			103	357	221	2,489	232	103	173	235	727	4,640	4.33%				
Total polled			1,964	7,283	4,933	56,428	4,673	2,669	3,906	5,074	20,214	107,144	44.13%				
Registered electors			5,148	15,266	11,980	124,441	13,101	6,051	8,454	12,649	45,689	242,779					
Turnout			38.15%	47.71%	41.18%	45.35%	35.67%	44.11%	46.20%	40.11%	44.24%	44.13%					

The following candidates were elected: Daniella Cicardini (PS), 16,129 votes; Sofía Cid (RN), 5,040 votes; Jaime Mulet (FREVS), 8,077 votes; Juan Santana (PS), 13,497 votes; and Cristian Tapia (PPD), 6,349 votes.

==== 2017 ====
Results of the 2017 general election held on 19 November 2017:

Party		Pact	Party												Pact		
Party		Pact	Votes per commune									Total votes	%	Seats	Votes	%	Seats
Party		Pact	Alto del Carmen	Cal- dera	Chaña- ral	Copi- apó	Diego de Al- magro	Frei- rina	Huas- co	Tierra Ama- rilla	Valle- nar	Total votes	%	Seats	Votes	%	Seats
Socialist Party of Chile	PS	Nueva Mayoría	270	1,247	1,556	10,063	1,107	913	739	1,101	5,737	22,733	24.24%	2	33,965	36.22%	2
Social Democrat Radical Party	PRSD	Nueva Mayoría	44	342	188	3,869	159	58	117	158	412	5,347	5.70%	0	33,965	36.22%	2
Communist Party of Chile	PC	Nueva Mayoría	41	204	157	2,163	648	81	87	145	269	3,795	4.05%	0	33,965	36.22%	2
Party for Democracy	PPD	Nueva Mayoría	13	213	60	595	61	4	97	936	111	2,090	2.23%	0	33,965	36.22%	2
National Renewal	RN	Chile Vamos	238	1,024	587	12,920	286	198	370	840	1,887	18,350	19.57%	1	28,230	30.11%	2
Independent Democratic Union	UDI	Chile Vamos	129	468	511	4,825	420	401	284	345	2,497	9,880	10.54%	1	28,230	30.11%	2
Social Green Regionalist Federation	FREVS	Green Regionalist Coalition	365	1,121	647	3,869	427	460	597	782	5,019	13,287	14.17%	1	13,287	14.17%	1
Citizen Power	PODER	Broad Front	244	433	322	6,404	182	70	120	300	707	8,782	9.37%	0	10,725	11.44%	0
Democratic Revolution	RD	Broad Front	25	108	56	1,337	88	23	44	61	201	1,943	2.07%	0	10,725	11.44%	0
Christian Democratic Party	PDC	Democratic Convergence	165	138	224	1,081	109	102	177	189	310	2,495	2.66%	0	4,470	4.77%	0
MAS Region	MAS	Democratic Convergence	33	112	38	332	34	25	259	42	268	1,143	1.22%	0	4,470	4.77%	0
Citizen Left	IC	Democratic Convergence	10	29	33	439	236	5	15	23	42	832	0.89%	0	4,470	4.77%	0
Progressive Party	PRO	All Over Chile	89	133	207	1,073	672	61	306	99	450	3,090	3.30%	0	3,090	3.30%	0
Valid votes			1,666	5,572	4,586	48,970	4,429	2,401	3,212	5,021	17,910	93,767	100.00%	5	93,767	100.00%	5
Blank votes			197	288	251	1,450	203	171	244	245	807	3,856	3.82%				
Rejected votes – other			84	255	190	1,477	159	87	147	188	625	3,212	3.19%				
Total polled			1,947	6,115	5,027	51,897	4,791	2,659	3,603	5,454	19,342	100,835	43.19%				
Registered electors			4,786	13,921	11,818	117,897	13,938	5,682	8,030	12,577	44,821	233,470					
Turnout			40.68%	43.93%	42.54%	44.02%	34.37%	46.80%	44.87%	43.36%	43.15%	43.19%					

The following candidates were elected: Daniella Cicardini (PS), 16,488 votes; Sofía Cid (RN), 13,325 votes; Jaime Mulet (FREVS), 9,393 votes; Nicolás Noman (UDI), 5,974 votes; and Juan Santana (PS), 6,245 votes.
