= Omar Jara =

Chilean politician

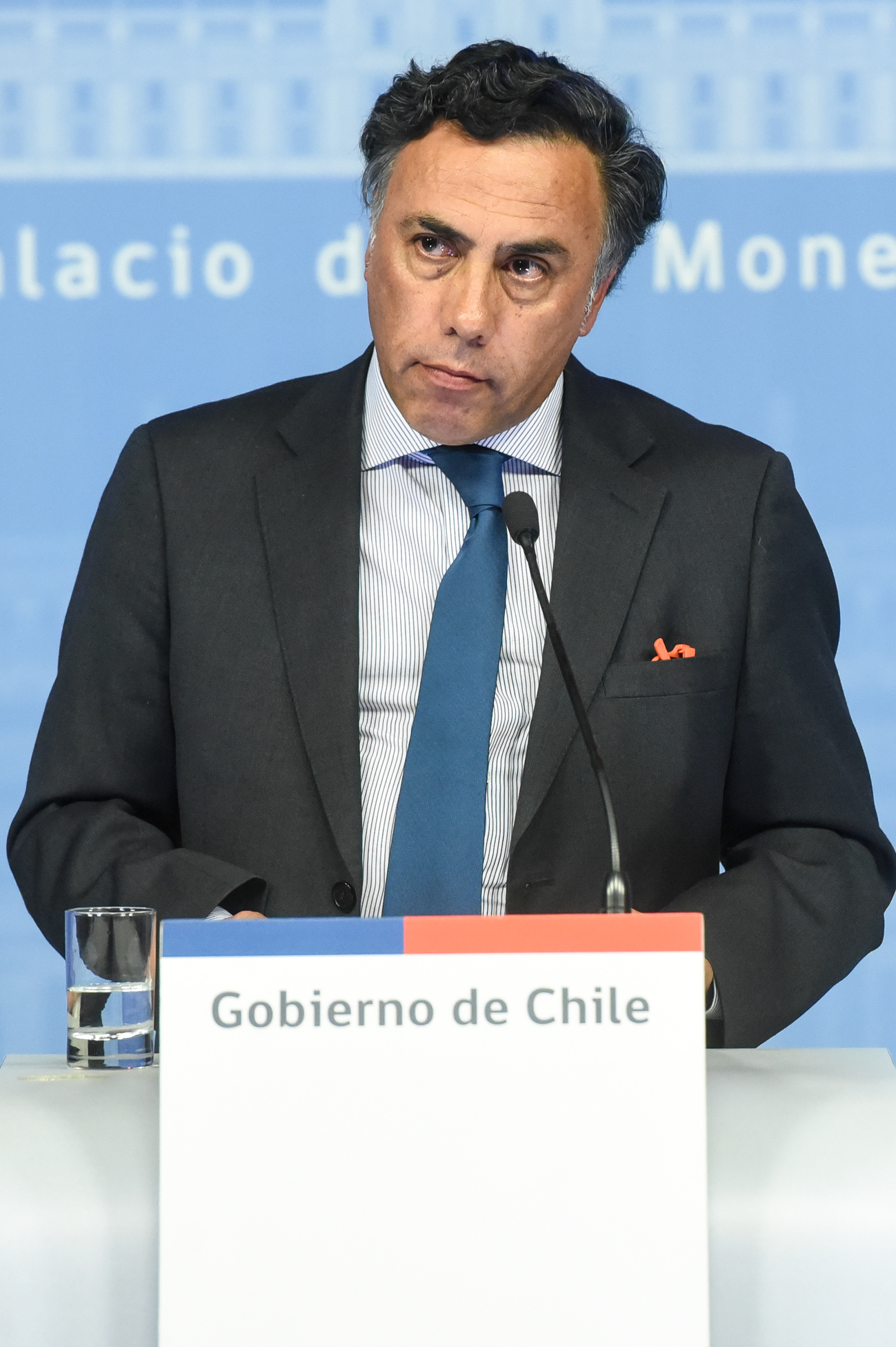

General Undesecretary of the Government
- In office 26 October 2016 – 11 March 2018
- Preceded by: Miguel Candia Irarrázaval
- Succeeded by: Emardo Hantelmann

Governor of Valparaíso Province
- In office 26 October 2016 – 11 March 2018
- Preceded by: José Pedro Núñez
- Succeeded by: Jorge Dip

President of the Playa Ancha University Students Federation
- In office 1984–1986
- Preceded by: Creation of the position
- Succeeded by: Yasna Provoste

Personal details
- Born: 1 January 1965 (age 61) Valparaíso, Chile
- Party: Christian Democratic Party
- Education: Playa Ancha University (BA); Complutense University of Madrid (MD)
- Occupation: Politician; Scholar
- Profession: Teacher of History; Political Scientist (International relations)

Omar Leonel Jara Aravena (born 1965) is a Chilean teacher and political scientist.

He was provincial governor of Valparaíso during the second government of Michelle Bachelet.

== Early life ==
Jara studied Pedagogy in History and Geography at the Playa Ancha University, standing out as the first president of its student federation. Later, he completed a master's degree in international relations at the Ortega y Gasset Institute of the Complutense University of Madrid.

== Political career ==
During the Concertación governments (1990−2010), he worked for the State of Chile forming part, for example, of the Program for the Improvement of the Quality of Education («MECE-Media») of the Ministry of Education. Later, he moved to the Ministry of Foreign Affairs in the first government of Michelle Bachelet (2006−2010), first as staff chief of the Minister Mariano Fernández and then as attaché at the Chilean Embassy in Spain.

During the mayor's office of Aldo Cornejo in Valparaíso (2004−2008), he served as administrator in the municipality and the University of Valparaíso (then he returned in 2016). Similarly, in this term he worked for the Consortium of State Universities.

=== Bachelet's second term ===
As soon as Michelle Bachelet assumed again as president, Jara was appointed as governor of the Valparaíso Province on 11 March 2014, same day of the same day of the presidential succession.

On 7 December 2015, he went through a very difficult time when he decided to suspend a defining match between Colo-Colo and Santiago Wanderers for the 2015 Torneo Apertura after riots by hooligans from both teams in the first five minutes of game.

In early 2016, he resigned to his position of governor to contest the municipal primary of the Nueva Mayoría for the mayor of Valparaíso. Nevertheless, he was defeated by the singer DJ Méndez, who was supported by the centre-leftist Party for Democracy (PPD). Time after this, on 26 October 2016, he was appointed as Undersecretary General of the Government by Bachelet.
