= Miguel Otero Lathrop =

Chilean politician (1930–2025)

Miguel Otero
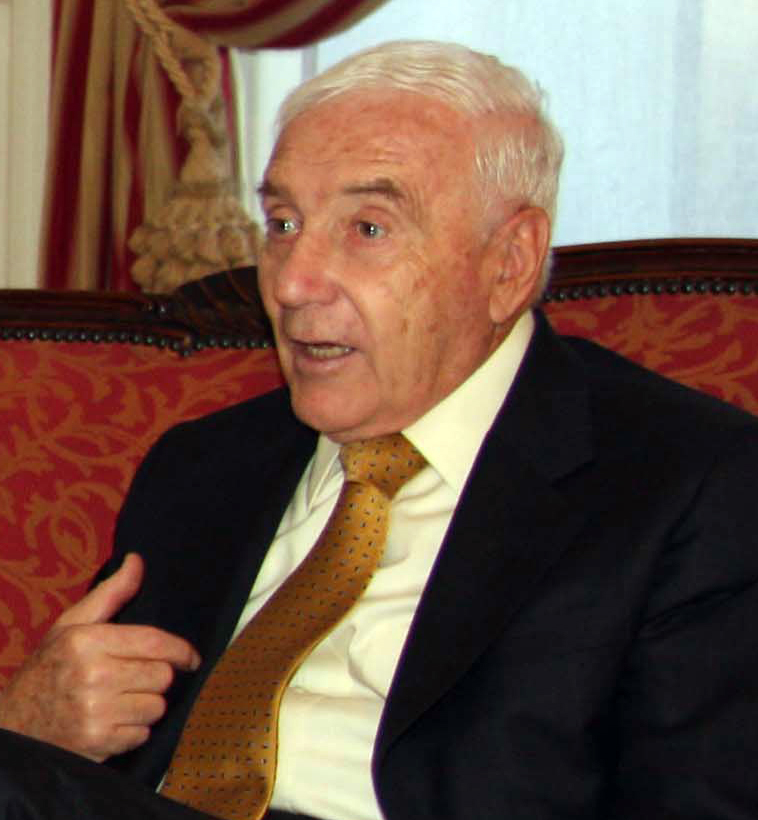
- Otero in 2010

Ambassador of Chile to Argentina
- In office 20 April 2010 – 8 June 2010
- President: Sebastian Piñera
- Preceded by: Luis Maira
- Succeeded by: Adolfo Zaldívar

Member of the Senate of Chile
- In office 10 April 1991 – 11 March 1998
- Preceded by: Jaime Guzmán
- Succeeded by: Jovino Novoa
- Constituency: 7th Circumscription

Personal details
- Born: 9 July 1930 Punta Arenas, Chile
- Died: 1 March 2025 (aged 94) Santiago, Chile
- Party: Liberal Party (1955–1966); National Party (1966–1973); National Renewal (1987–2025)
- Spouse: Patricia Alvarado
- Children: Four
- Parent(s): Jorge Otero; María Lathrop
- Education: University of Chile (LL.B); Southern Methodist University (LL.M)
- Occupation: Politician
- Profession: Lawyer

Jorge Miguel Otero Lathrop (9 July 1930 – 1 March 2025) was a Chilean politician and diplomat who served as senator and ambassador.

During the 1990s, he served as a senator for seven years. Later, during the first government of Sebastián Piñera, he briefly held the position of Chilean ambassador to Argentina.

== Early life and education ==
Otero was born to José Antonio Otero Bañados, a lawyer, and María Lathrop Zavala. He studied at Saint George's College, Santiago and later enrolled in the Military School of Libertador Bernardo O'Higgins, where he reached the rank of infantry officer in 1947.

He later abandoned his military career to study Law at the University of Chile, where he graduated in 1955. His thesis was titled De los Tribunales, del Ministerio Público y de la Defensoría General de Carabineros.

In 1956, he traveled to the United States with a scholarship from the Law Institute of the Americas to study at Southern Methodist University in Dallas. In 1957, he obtained a Master in Comparative law, graduating Cum laude.

== Political career ==
=== Early political involvement ===
Otero's political involvement began during his university years, where he served as Vice President of the Law Student Center, faculty delegate to the University of Chile Student Federation, and National University Councilor.

He was a member of the Liberal Party, and after its dissolution in 1966, he joined the National Party.

After the 1973 Chilean coup d'état, he distanced himself from active politics, only returning in the late 1980s, when he joined National Renewal. He later became Vice President of the party (1988–1992).

=== Senator and ambassador ===
In the 1989 parliamentary elections, Otero ran for a Senate seat in Santiago Metropolitan Region (District 7) but was unsuccessful. However, following the assassination of Jaime Guzmán, he was appointed his replacement in April 1991.

In 2010, he was appointed Chilean ambassador to Argentina by President Sebastián Piñera. However, his tenure lasted only 50 days due to controversy over an interview with the Argentine newspaper Clarín, in which he justified the 1973 coup that overthrew socialist president Salvador Allende. The backlash led to his resignation.

== Academic and professional career ==
Since 1961, Otero was a professor of procedural law at the University of Chile, where he became a full professor in 2000. He also taught at the Police Science Academy from 1986 onward.

== Personal life ==
Otero was married to Patricia Alvarado Moore, with whom he had four children.

== Death ==
Otero died at the age of 94 in Santiago, Chile.

== Electoral history ==
=== 1989 Parliamentary Elections – Santiago Poniente (District 7) ===
Candidate	Coalition	Party	Votes	%	Result
Andrés Zaldívar Larraín	Concertación por la Democracia	PDC	408,227	31.27%	Elected Senator
Ricardo Lagos Escobar	Concertación por la Democracia	PPD	399,721	30.62%	Not elected
Jaime Guzmán Errázuriz	Democracia y Progreso	UDI	224,396	17.19%	Elected Senator
Miguel Otero Lathrop	Democracia y Progreso	RN	199,856	15.31%	Not elected
Sergio Santander Sepúlveda	Liberal-Socialista Chileno	ILE	59,834	4.58%	Not elected
Rodrigo Miranda	Liberal-Socialista Chileno	ILE	13,435	1.03%	Not elected
