= Ignacio Balbontín =

Chilean politician (1940–2015)

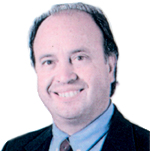

Member of the Chamber of Deputies of Chile
- In office 11 March 1994 – 11 March 1998
- Preceded by: Carlos Bosselin
- Succeeded by: Carlos Olivares
- Constituency: 18th district

Personal details
- Born: 18 June 1940
- Died: 18 September 2015 (aged 75) Talca, Chile
- Party: Christian Democratic Party

Ignacio Balbontín Arteaga (18 July 1940 – 18 August 2015) was a Chilean politician. A member of the Christian Democratic Party, he served in the Chamber of Deputies of Chile.
