= Daniella Cicardini =

Chilean politician (born 1987)

- Cicardini in 2026

Member of the Senate
- Incumbent
- Assumed office 11 March 2026
- Constituency: District 4

Member of the Chamber of Deputies
- In office 11 March 2014 – 11 March 2026
- Constituency: District 5 (2014–2018); District 4 (2018–2026)

Personal details
- Born: 31 December 1987 (age 38)
- Party: Socialist Party (since 2014)
- Parent: Maglio Cicardini (father)

Daniella Valentina Cicardini Milla (born 31 December 1987) is a Chilean politician serving as a member of the Senate since 2026. From 2014 to 2026, she was a member of the Chamber of Deputies. She is the daughter of Maglio Cicardini.
