= Jorge Dip =

Chilean lawyer and politician

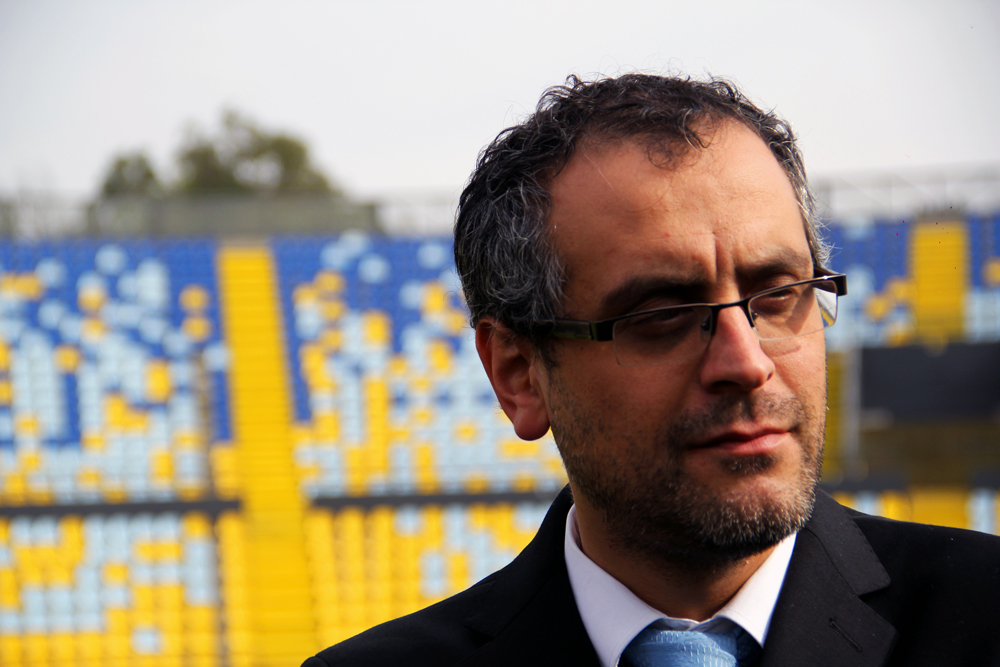
- Jorge Dip inspecting the Sausalito Stadium in 2017.

Governor of the province of Valparaíso
- In office 28 April 2016 – 11 March 2018
- President: Michelle Bachelet
- Preceded by: Omar Jara
- Succeeded by: María de los Ángeles de la Paz Riveros
- In office 2014–2016

Regional Ministerial Secretary of Government in the Valparaíso Region
- President: Michelle Bachelet

Personal details
- Born: 31 May 1981 (age 45) Chile Valparaíso, Chile
- Party: Christian Democratic Party
- Education: University of Valparaíso
- Profession: Lawyer

Jorge Arturo Dip Calderón is a Chilean lawyer and politician, governor of the province of Valparaíso between 2016 and 2018. He is a member of the Christian Democratic Party.

== Career ==
He is a lawyer from the University of Valparaíso. He served as Seremi of National Assets in the Valparaíso Region from 2014 to 2016, where he was in charge of property investigations in the fifth region of the defunct Cema Chile, then chaired by Lucía Hiriart, widow of dictator Augusto Pinochet. Later he was appointed Governor of the Province of Valparaíso. During his administration, he prohibited the visiting public from entering the Sausalito Stadium, for not having the necessary security measures, an issue resisted by the Everton club authorities, although finally resolved by the leadership of the club equipment. Parliamentarians from the UDI and Amplitude demanded his removal from office due to incidents caused by Colo-Colo baristasin a match with Santiago Wanderers.

Likewise, during his administration, activities were promoted for the reactivation of tourism. After leaving his position, he became director of administration and logistics at the University of Valparaíso, in charge of coordinating the collaboration of said university with the Constitutional Convention 16-17-18 together with other tasks for the operation of the University Convention.
