= Claudia Nogueira =

Chilean politician (born 1969)

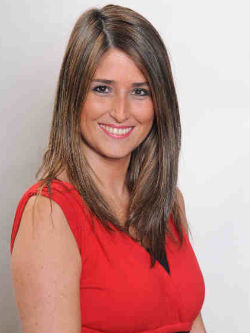

Member of the Chamber of Deputies
- In office 11 March 2006 – 11 March 2018
- Preceded by: Cristian Leay
- Succeeded by: Dissolution of the Office
- Constituency: Independencia and Recoleta (19th District)

Personal details
- Born: 26 November 1969 (age 56) Santiago, Chile
- Party: Independent Democratic Union (UDI)
- Spouse: Gonzalo Cornejo
- Children: Two
- Education: Gabriela Mistral University (LL.B)
- Occupation: Politician
- Profession: Lawyer

Claudia Andrea Nogueira Fernández (born 26 November 1969) is a Chilean politician who served as a member of the Chamber of Deputies.

== Early life and family ==
She was born on 26 November 1969 in Santiago. She is married to Gonzalo Cornejo and they have two children.

=== Professional career ===
She studied at Craighouse School in Santiago and at Colegio La Salle in Temuco. She pursued higher education at Gabriela Mistral University, where she studied Law, obtaining a Licentiate in Law and subsequently the professional title of lawyer granted by the Supreme Court of Chile on 12 May 1997.

Professionally, she served as a professor of Introduction to Law in the Journalism and Auditing programs at Andrés Bello National University. She also practiced law at the firm Piddo, Paniagua, Cornejo y Asociados.

In the social sphere, she has promoted initiatives aimed at empowering women, especially female heads of household, by creating training centers, workshops and other actions designed to improve the situation of vulnerable women in her district. She has shown similar concern for older adults and has expressed particular interest in improving early childhood education and nursery schools.

== Political career ==
At the age of 18, she participated in the founding of the Independent Democratic Union (UDI) and served as a university leader within the party, taking part in its social outreach activities.

From a young age, she has dedicated herself to social and political work, actively participating in municipal, parliamentary and presidential campaigns of her party.

Her public work has focused on a strong commitment to women—especially those in vulnerable situations—gender equity, the defense of life and family, older adults, public security, and children and adolescents.

She currently serves as Vice President of ParlAmericas, a network of national legislatures of the member states of the Organization of American States (OAS), which functions as an independent forum for parliamentarians of the Americas committed to cooperative political dialogue and participation in the inter-American system.
