= Sara Larraín =

Chilean politician (born 1952)

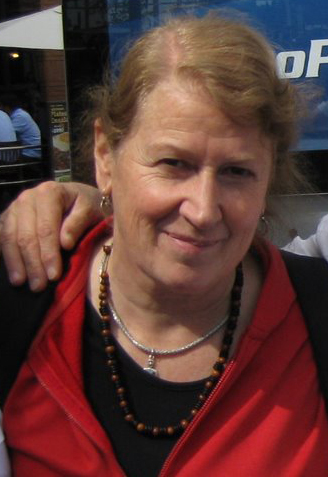
Larraín Ruiz-Tagle

Sara María Larraín Ruiz-Tagle (born 1952) is a Chilean politician and environmentalist who ran for president in 1999 presidential election, becoming, alongside Gladys Marín, the first female candidates to contest the first round of a presidential election in Chile. She is of Basque descent.

Larraín currently sits on the board of directors of the International Forum on Globalization.

== Education and early career ==
Larraín attended the Universidad de Chile in 1972, studying anthropology. She went on to finish her studies at the Pontifical Catholic University of Chile, receiving a degree in teaching for the plastic arts.

From 1978 to 1989, Larraín was an academic in the field of aesthetics, teaching at Chile's Catholic universities, Universidad Metropolitana de Ciencias de la Educación. From 1989 to 1993, she was a founding member and the director of the Chile (Pacífico Sur) office of Greenpeace, and also worked with organizations like RENACE (Red Nacional de Acción Ecológica, or the "National Network for Environmental Action") and organizations for the research of globalization. From 1997 to 2001 she served as the director of the Sustainable Chile Program (Programa Chile Sustentable).

== 1999 Presidential campaign ==
Larraín put herself forth as an independent candidate for the presidency of Chile in the 1999 presidential election. Supported by various environmentalists, she managed to receive the 0.5% of signatures necessary to file her candidacy. In the election, she received 31,319 votes, or 0.44% of the vote, coming in fifth place. The only candidate she bested was former Senator, Arturo Frei. When the first vote resulted in no majority, a runoff election was held between Ricardo Lagos (PPD/CPD) and Joaquín Lavín (UDI/APC). Larraín, along with Gladys Marín (PCC) and Tomás Hirsch (PH) threw their support behind the Concertación coalition candidate, Ricardo Lagos. Lagos went on to defeat Lavín, the conservative candidate.

== Environmental activism ==
Larraín has continued her environmental activism with various organizations, principally working with the Sustainable Chile Program, of which she serves as director. Since 2001 she has served as a member of the Consultative Council of the National Commission for the Environment (Comisión Nacional del Medio Ambiente, CONAMA). She has also been a strong opponent of projects like the Pascua Lama, the dams in the Aisén Region, and the introduction of nuclear power in her country to address Chile's energy crisis. This has caused her to distance herself from the Concertación governments, despite their earlier closeness.
