= Hosain Sabag =

Chilean politician (born 1937)

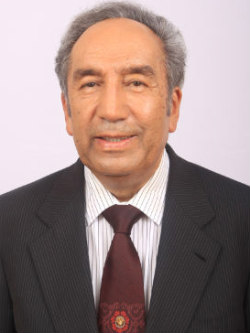

Member of the Senate of Chile
- In office 11 March 1998 – 11 March 2014
- Preceded by: Arturo Frei Bolívar
- Succeeded by: Jacqueline van Rysselberghe
- Constituency: 12nd Circumscription (Bío Bío Region)

Member of the Chamber of Deputies
- In office 11 March 1990 – 11 March 1998
- Preceded by: Creation of the Office
- Succeeded by: Iván Mesías
- Constituency: 42nd District
- In office 15 May 1973 – 21 September 1973
- Succeeded by: 1973 coup d'etat

Mayor of Cabrero
- In office 1963–1973
- Preceded by: Lautaro Cáceres Ramos
- Succeeded by: Manfred Suiter Hertlein

Personal details
- Born: 5 May 1937 (age 89) Cabrero, Chile
- Party: Christian Democratic Party
- Spouse: Fresia Villalobos
- Children: Three
- Education: University of Chile
- Occupation: Politician
- Profession: Counter

Hosain Sabag Castillo (born 5 May 1937) is a Chilean politician who served as Senator and Deputy for his country.

== Political career ==
In 1962, he joined the Christian Democratic Party (PDC), and the following year he was elected councilman and mayor of Cabrero for three consecutive terms, in 1963, 1967, and 1971. He resigned from his mayoral position during his third term, after a year and a half, being replaced by another councilman, in order to run for deputy in the 1973 parliamentary elections. He was elected for the 1973–1977 term, serving until the coup d’état of 11 September 1973.

He was elected provincial president of his party in the Province of Concepción during 1971–1972.

In 1988, he was elected regional vice-president for the "No" campaign in the national plebiscite.

=== Deputy (1990–1998) ===
With the return of democracy, he ran in the 1989 parliamentary elections for Deputy in District 42 as an independent, being elected with the highest vote total. In the 1993 elections he was re-elected, this time as a member of the PDC, obtaining 56% of the vote and achieving a "doblaje" (double win) for the Concertación alongside the PPD candidate Felipe Letelier in that district.

As a deputy, he was a member of the following committees: Public Works, Transport and Telecommunications (for 7 years); the Special Committee on the "Plan for the Provinces of Arica and Parinacota"; the Finance Committee of the Chamber of Deputies (for 8 years); president of the Public Works, Transport and Telecommunications Committee; president of the Joint Subcommittee on the National Budget for two years; member of the Chilean–Australian Committee; and president of the Chilean–Lebanese Parliamentary Friendship Group.

=== Senator (1998–2014) ===
Given his strong electoral support in District 42, in 1997 he ran for senator in Constituency 12 and was elected with the highest vote (31.27%) and a "doblaje" for the Concertación alongside the Socialist Party (PS) candidate José Antonio Viera-Gallo. Together they obtained 61.49% of the vote. In the 2005 elections, he again ran for senator and was re-elected with the second-highest vote, this time paired with the PS candidate Alejandro Navarro. Once more they achieved the historic "doblaje" for the Concertación, increasing its senatorial vote share in Constituency 12 to 67.59% and defeating the right-wing candidate, the UDI’s Carlos Bombal.

In the Senate, he served as president of the Housing and Urbanism Committee (1998–2001); member of the Public Works, Transport and Telecommunications Committee; president of a Joint Senate Committee (Project "Regularization of housing without building permits"); and representative of the Chilean Senate at the First World Congress of Parliamentarians of Lebanese Descent (Beirut, Lebanon, April 1998).

In the 2013 elections, he sought re-election as senator, but was defeated, leaving office on 11 March 2014.
