= Waldo Mora =

Chilean politician

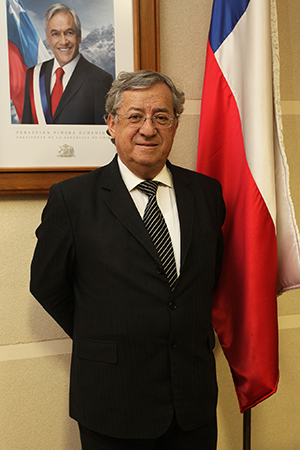
- Mora Longa in 2013

Intendant of the Antofagasta Region
- In office 12 August 2013 – 11 March 2014
- Preceded by: Pablo Toloza
- Succeeded by: Valentín Volta

Member of the Chamber of Deputies
- In office 11 March 1998 – 11 March 2006
- Preceded by: Carlos Cantero
- Succeeded by: Felipe Ward
- Constituency: 3rd District (Calama, María Elena, Ollagüe, San Pedro de Atacama and Tocopilla)

Personal details
- Born: 12 December 1942 (age 83) Santiago, Chile
- Party: Christian Democratic Party (1969–2009)
- Education: University of Chile
- Occupation: Politician
- Profession: Journalist

Waldo Manuel Mora Longa (born 12 December 1942) is a Chilean politician and journalist who served as member of the Chamber of Deputies of Chile and also as an Intendant of the Antofagasta Region.

== Biography ==
He was born on 12 December 1942 in Tocopilla, Chile. He was the son of Guido Mora Coloma and Julia Longa Torres. He was married to Liliana Alarcón González.

=== Professional career ===
He completed his primary education at Escuela N°7 in Tocopilla and his secondary education at Liceo Mixto of the same city. After finishing school, he enrolled at the University of Chile, where he qualified as a journalist.

In the professional sphere, he worked as an agent of Investigations Police of Chile (1962–1965). He later served as an official of the Office of the Comptroller General of the Republic of Chile from 1965 to 1968, and in 1968 became head of inspection at the Directorate of Industry and Commerce (DIRINCO) of the Ministry of Economy, a post he held until 1970. In September 1973, the new authorities appointed him head of DIRINCO.

From 1974 onward he held various occupations: between 1975 and 1988 he worked as a sports commentator; between 1984 and 1988 he was a radio entrepreneur; and from 1993 he worked in the real-estate sector. He created the sports program La Sintonía Azul, dedicated to Universidad de Chile football club.

== Political career ==
He began his political career in 1969 as a leader of the youth wing of the Christian Democratic Party.

In 1970 he became director of Radio Balmaceda, remaining in the position until 1974. He was also active in the public-sector labor movement, serving as a leader within the National Association of State Employees (ANEF) between 1971 and 1973, and as a leader of the Association of DIRINCO Inspectors between 1971 and 1974.

Linked to journalism, he was a leader and president of the Metropolitan Journalists' Association (Colegio de Periodistas Metropolitano) and served as a National Councillor between 1979 and 1988. Within the Christian Democratic Party, he served as vice-president and provincial president for Santiago Centro (1983–1992), and as a National Councillor (1991–1999).

In the 1997 parliamentary elections, he was elected to the Chamber of Deputies of Chile for District No. 3 (Calama, María Elena, Ollagüe, San Pedro de Atacama, and Tocopilla) for the 1998–2002 term. In 2001 he was re-elected for the same district for the 2002–2006 term, obtaining the first majority in the district. In the 2005 elections, he ran for re-election but was not returned to Congress.

In 2009 he resigned his membership in the Christian Democratic Party. Between 2011 and 2013 he served as chairman of the board of the Port Company of Antofagasta (Empresa Portuaria de Antofagasta). In 2012 he ran as an independent candidate for mayor for Santiago Centro under the «Regionalists and Independents» pact.

On 12 August 2013, President Sebastián Piñera appointed him Intendant of the Antofagasta Region, a position he held until 11 March 2014.
