= María de los Ángeles de la Paz Riveros =

Chilean lawyer

María de los Ángeles de la Paz
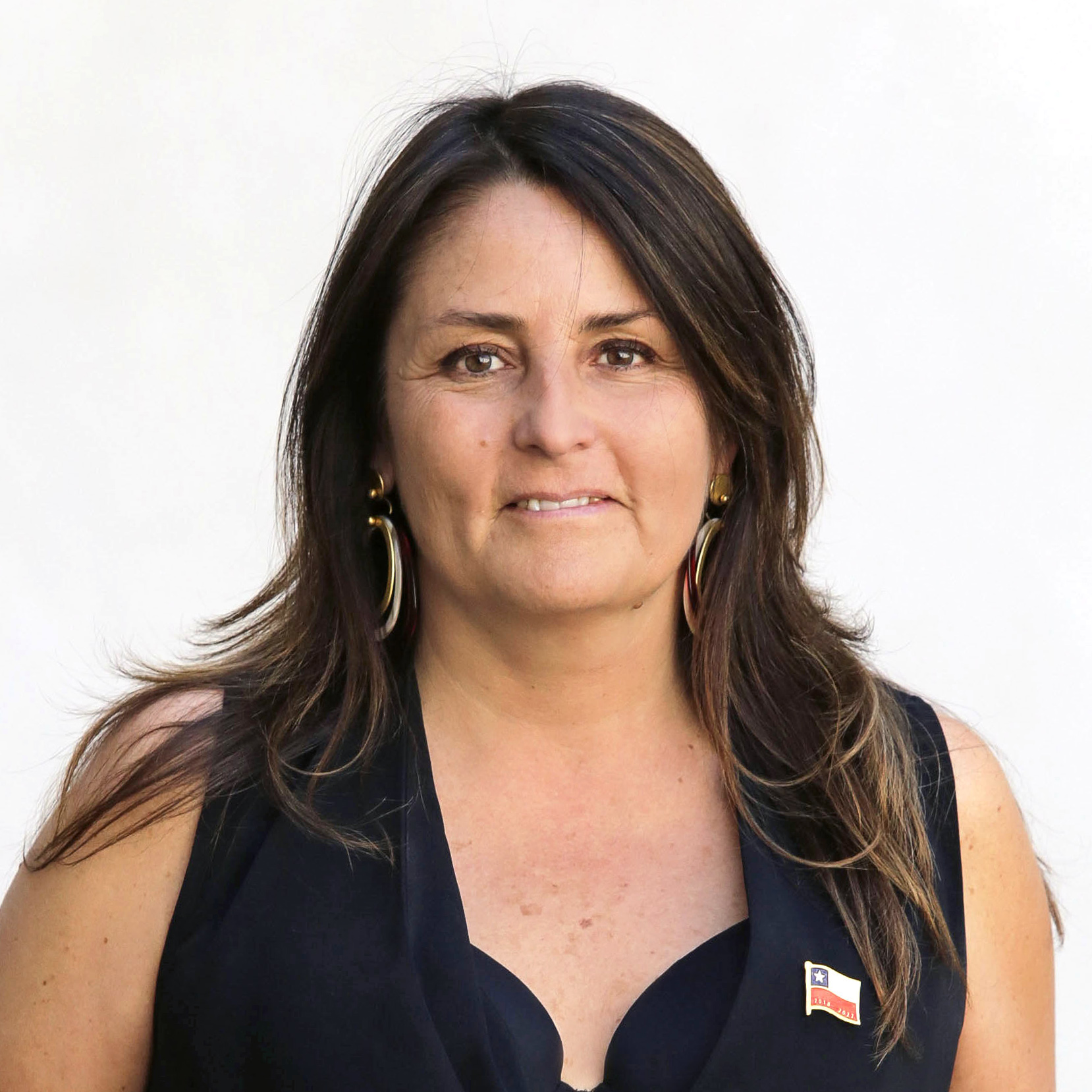
- Official portrait of María de los Ángeles as Governor in 2018.

Governor of the Province of Valparaíso
- In office March 11, 2018 – October 18, 2019
- President: Sebastián Piñera
- Preceded by: Jorge Dip
- Succeeded by: Gonzalo LeDantec Briceño

Personal details
- Born: November 15, 1968 Chile Santiago, Chile
- Party: Political Evolution
- Education: Gabriela Mistral University
- Profession: Politician and lawyer

María de los Ángeles de la Paz Riveros is a Chilean lawyer politician and governor of the province of Valparaíso between 2018 and 2019.

== Early life and education ==
She was born on November 15, 1968. Her basic and intermediate studies were carried out at Colegio Saint John's Villa Academy in Santiago. She is a lawyer from Gabriela Mistral University.

== Public and political career ==
Before assuming responsibilities during the first government of Sebastián Piñera, she worked as a lawyer for the Office for the Protection of Children's Rights in the Municipality of del Mar Viña.

Between 2010 and 2014, she served as Chief of Staff of Service Valparaíso, Seremi of Social Development of the Valparaíso Region, and Regional Director of National Service for Women.

She was appointed municipal delegate to attend to the needs of the victims of the great Valparaíso fire in 2015, during the mayoralty of Jorge Castro Muñoz. Until March 11, 2018, she was the municipal administrator of the María Pinto, the date on which she became governor of the province of Valparaíso. She left office on October 18, 2019, to present herself as a candidate for mayor of Valparaíso.

In the year 2020, she became National Vice President of the Political Evolution.
