= Arturo Frei Bolívar =

Chilean politician (1939–2022)

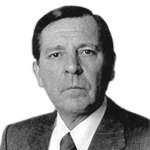

Member of the Senate
- In office 11 March 1990 – 11 March 1998
- Succeeded by: Hosain Sabag

Member of the Chamber of Deputies
- In office 15 May 1969 – 11 September 1973

Personal details
- Born: 18 November 1939 Santiago, Chile
- Died: January 2022
- Party: Independent (since 2000)
- Other political affiliations: Christian Democratic Party (–1998); Progressive Union of the Centrist Center (1999)
- Education: Pontifical Catholic University of Chile

Erwin Arturo Frei Bolívar (18 November 1939 – January 2022) was a Chilean politician who was a senator and presidential candidate in the 1999 election.

On 10 March 1998, he was awarded the Cross of Victory by the Chilean Army, the highest distinction granted by that institution to a Chilean politician.

== Biography ==
He was born in Santiago on 18 November 1939. He was the son of Arturo Frei Montalva and Marcela Bolívar Le-Fort. He was the nephew of former President of Chile Eduardo Frei Montalva, and the cousin of former President and Senator Eduardo Frei Ruiz-Tagle and of former Senator Carmen Frei.

He married María Antonia Urzúa Meyer and, in a second marriage, María Beatriz Ruitort, with whom he had one son. He died in Santiago on 13 January 2022.

=== Professional career ===
He studied at the Sacred Hearts School in Concepción and Santiago. After completing secondary education, he entered the Faculty of Law of the Pontifical Catholic University of Chile. He completed his law studies in 1965 and later presented his graduation thesis entitled “Constitutional Bases of the Public Forces”. He was admitted to the bar on 5 December 1966.

While a student, he engaged in various academic and professional activities related to his field, including serving for two years as a teaching assistant in Tax Law at the Faculty of Law of the Pontifical Catholic University of Chile. From 1960 to 1964, he worked as Head of Public Relations at Camer. In 1969, he served as legal counsel ―Fiscal― of the Huelén Savings and Loan Association.

After the 11 September 1973 coup, he practiced law privately. He was a partner of Avellaneda Ltda. and, from 1977 onward, served as its legal advisor.

He authored numerous articles published in newspapers and magazines and collaborated for several years as a regular columnist for La Tercera in Santiago and El Sur in Concepción.

== Political career ==
He began his political activities by running as a delegate of the Student Council of the Faculty of Law of the Pontifical Catholic University of Chile. In 1957, he joined the Christian Democratic Party of Chile, becoming party leader at the Faculty of Law and serving as a delegate to the student federation.

He collaborated in the presidential campaign of Eduardo Frei Montalva and, from 1963 onward, served as provincial head of the Department of Settlers ―Departamento de Pobladores―. Between 1960 and 1964, he worked as a judicial attorney for the Chilean Air Force, and between 1964 and 1969, as a lawyer at the Ministry of Economy within the Directorate of Industry and Commerce (DIRINCO).

He was elected Deputy for the 17th Departmental District (Concepción, Tomé, Talcahuano, Yumbel, and Coronel) for two consecutive terms between 1969 and 1973.

In 1981, he was elected National Councillor of the Christian Democratic Party and later became a member of its Political Commission, serving until his resignation from the party in 1999. Nine years later, he was elected Senator for the 12th Senatorial District (North), Biobío Region, serving between 1990 and 1998.

In 1999, he ran as an independent candidate for the presidency of the Republic, being proclaimed on 9 August with the support of the Popular Alliance, which included the Union of the Centrist Center party and independent sectors. He was defeated by the candidate of the Concertación, Ricardo Lagos.

Throughout his career, he was invited by governments of various countries, including the United States, Germany, Belgium, Italy, Spain, the United Kingdom, the Soviet Union, France, Malaysia, China, Japan, and the Philippines.
