= Paulina Vodanovic =

Chilean politician

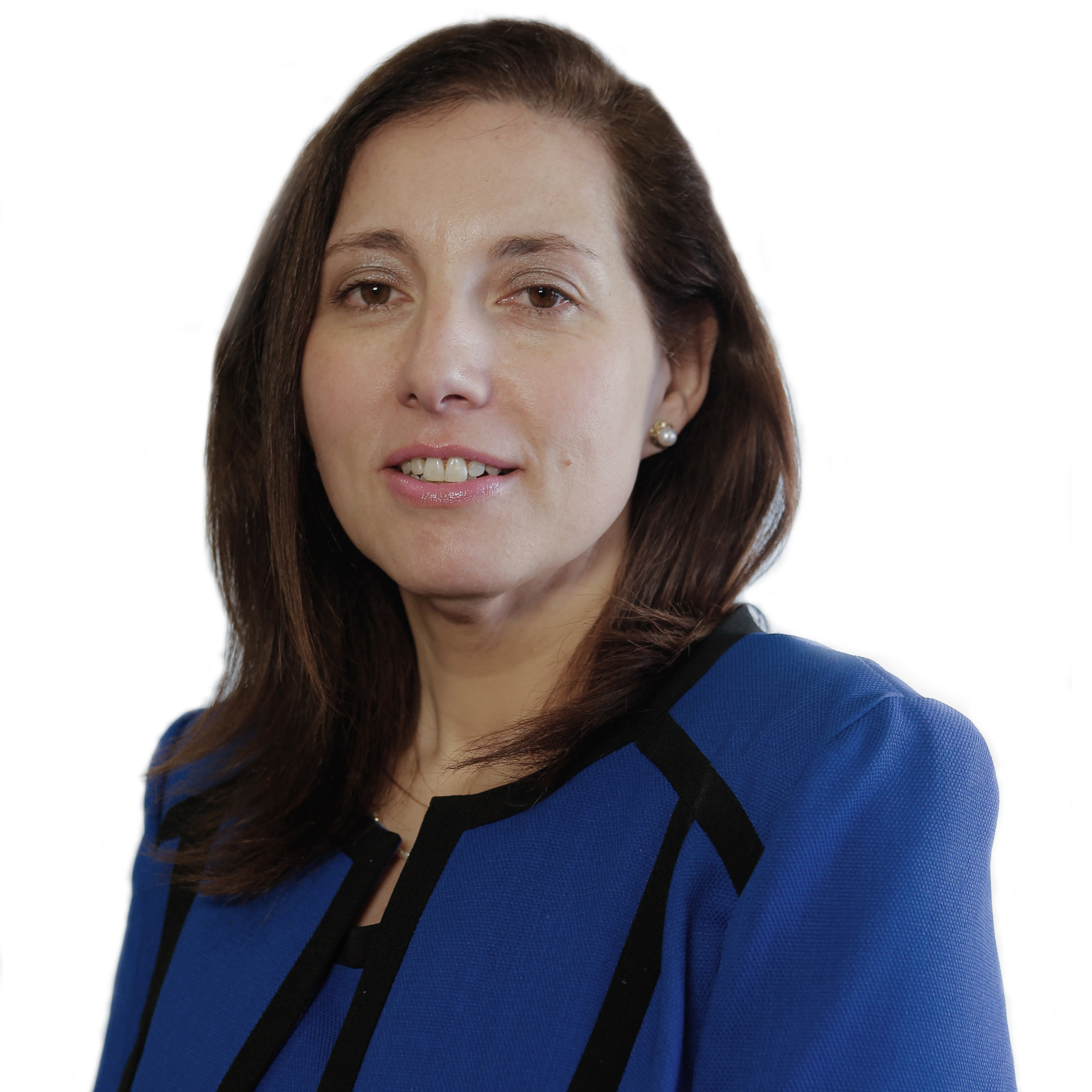

Member of the Senate of Chile
- Incumbent
- Assumed office 25 April 2023
- Preceded by: Álvaro Elizalde

Undersecretary for the Chilean Army
- In office 20 October 2015 – 11 March 2018
- President: Michelle Bachelet
- Preceded by: Gabriel Gaspar
- Succeeded by: Juan Francisco Galli

Personal details
- Born: 20 September 1971 (age 55) Santiago, Chile
- Party: Socialist Party (1989−present)
- Spouse: Iván Candell
- Children: Two
- Parent(s): Hernán Vodanovic; María Rojas
- Education: University of Chile (LL.B) (LL.M)
- Occupation: Politician
- Profession: Lawyer

Paulina Eugenia Vodanovic Rojas (born 20 September 1971) is a Chilean politician who currently serves as president of the Socialist Party.

A member of the Socialist Party of Chile, she has served as its president since 2022. She has been a senator for the Maule Region since April 2023, after being appointed by her party to complete the 2018–2026 term vacated by Álvaro Elizalde, and was subsequently re-elected for the 2026–2034 term.

Vodanovic previously served as Undersecretary for the Armed Forces during the second administration of President Michelle Bachelet from 2015 to 2018, becoming the first woman to hold the position.

== Early life and education ==
Vodanovic was born in Santiago on 20 September 1971. She is the daughter of María Rosa Rojas Verdugo and Hernán Vodanovic, a former senator and former minister of the Constitutional Court of Chile.

She completed her secondary education at the Alliance Française and later at the Liceo Javiera Carrera in Santiago. She studied law at the University of Chile, qualifying as an attorney in 2003, and later earned a master's degree in public law at the same institution.

== Professional career ==
Vodanovic has practiced law in the private sector, litigating before the Supreme Court of Chile and the Courts of Appeal of Chile, as well as civil, labor, and family courts. She has also served as an arbitrator appointed by Santiago's civil courts. In parallel, she has taught courses in political law, constitutional law, and introduction to law at the Universidad Autónoma de Chile and UNIACC University.

A member of the Socialist Party of Chile since 1989, she served as head of the Legal Division of the Ministry of Justice between August 2014 and May 2015. She later became head of legal advisers and subsequently chief of staff to the Minister of Defense, José Antonio Gómez, in 2015.

On 21 October 2015, President Michelle Bachelet appointed her Undersecretary for the Armed Forces, making her the first woman to hold the office.

During her tenure, she addressed reforms to the military pension system, implemented new financial oversight policies following corruption cases, established sexual harassment protocols, and promoted human rights programs within the armed forces.

After leaving office in 2018, she served as a council member of the Chilean Bar Association for the 2019–2021 term.

== Political career ==
In March 2020, Vodanovic was appointed president of the Horizonte Ciudadano Foundation, created by Michelle Bachelet, and also chaired its Human Rights Commission. In 2021, she served as a coordinator for Paula Narváez's presidential primary campaign within the Unidad Constituyente coalition.

In May 2022, she was elected to the Socialist Party's Central Committee with the highest national vote count and was subsequently chosen as party president in June 2022.

In April 2023, she was appointed to the Senate of Chile to fill the seat vacated by Álvaro Elizalde following his appointment as Minister Secretary-General of the Presidency.

In April 2025, she was proclaimed by the Socialist Party as its presidential candidate for the 2025 Chilean presidential election, but later withdrew her candidacy later that month.
