= Jaime Mulet =

Chilean politician (born 1963)

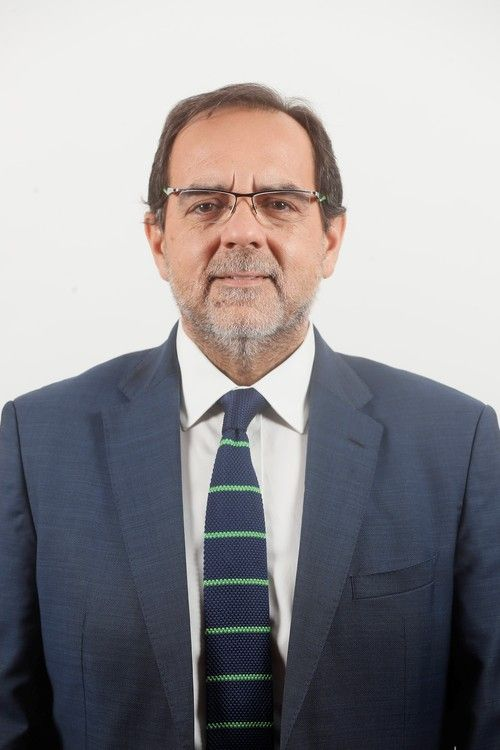

Member of the Chamber of Deputies
- Incumbent
- Assumed office 11 March 2018
- Preceded by: Creation of the charge
- Constituency: District 4
- In office 11 March 1998 – 11 March 2010
- Preceded by: Armando Arancibia
- Succeeded by: Giovanni Calderón Bassi
- Constituency: 6th District

President of the Social Green Regionalist Federation
- Incumbent
- Assumed office 24 January 2017
- Preceded by: Creation of the charge

President of the Regional and Popular Front
- In office 24 November 2015 – 25 April 2017
- Preceded by: Creation of the charge
- Succeeded by: Dissolution of the charge

President of the Independent Regionalist Party
- In office 2008–2009
- Preceded by: Juan Carlos Moraga
- Succeeded by: Adolfo Zaldívar

Regional Ministerial Secretary
- In office 11 March 1990 – 11 March 1992

Personal details
- Born: 3 August 1963 (age 63) Vallenar, Chile
- Party: Christian Democracy (1980–2008); Independent Regionalist Party (2008–2010); Regional and Popular Front (2015–2017); Social Green Regionalist Federation (2017–present)
- Spouse: Flavia Torrealba
- Children: Five
- Parent(s): Juan Gaspar Mulet; Carlota Martínez Franco
- Education: Pontifical Catholic University of Chile (LL.B); Alberto Hurtado University (M.D.)
- Occupation: Politician
- Profession: Lawyer

Jaime Francisco Mulet Martínez (born 3 August 1963) is a Chilean politician and lawyer. He has served multiple terms as a deputy in the Chamber of Deputies of Chile and is currently the president of the political party Federación Regionalista Verde Social (FRVS). Throughout his career, Mulet has been associated with various political movements, starting with the Christian Democratic Party and later aligning with regionalist and environmental platforms.

Mulet studied law at the Pontifical Catholic University of Chile and initially worked as a lawyer, particularly in matters related to mining and regional development. He was first elected to Congress in 1998, representing the Atacama Region, and was re-elected in 2002 and 2006. Over time, he distanced himself from the Christian Democratic Party due to disagreements over political direction and alliances, and eventually founded FRVS in 2015.

In 2025, Mulet participated as a presidential pre-candidate in the primary elections of the Apruebo Dignidad coalition. He did not win the nomination, but his candidacy reflected the continuing role of regionalist perspectives within broader political debates in Chile.

== Biography's ==
He is the son of Jaime Mulet and Olga Martínez. His childhood and adolescence took place in northern Chile, which deeply shaped his regionalist vocation.

He studied at the San Francisco High School in Vallenar, where he stood out for his student leadership. He later enrolled in the Law School of the Pontifical Catholic University of Chile, where he earned his law degree.

== Political career ==
=== Beginnings in the PDC ===
Mulet began his political career in the Christian Democratic Party (PDC), where he was a member throughout much of the 1980s and 1990s. He was elected as a deputy for the then District 6 (Copiapó, Caldera, Tierra Amarilla) in 1998, and was re-elected in 2002 and 2006. During this period, he was part of the Concertación coalition, supporting the governments of Eduardo Frei Ruiz-Tagle, Ricardo Lagos, and Michelle Bachelet in her first term.

During his years in the PDC, he was known for his critical stance against Santiago's centralism, actively promoting decentralization policies and greater investment in the regions.

=== Split from the PDC ===
In 2008, Mulet resigned from the PDC following strong disagreements with the party’s leadership and its alliance strategies within the Concertación. He later participated in the creation of the Independent Regionalist Party (PRI) alongside Adolfo Zaldívar. However, he eventually distanced himself from that party as well, arguing that it had strayed from its original regionalist convictions.

In 2015, he founded the Federación Regionalista Verde Social (FRVS), a party he has led ever since. The organization aims to represent rural sectors, Indigenous communities, and socio-environmental movements that oppose unregulated extractivism, especially in northern Chile.

=== Return to Congress ===
In the 2017 parliamentary elections, Mulet returned to Congress as a deputy for the newly created District 4 (Atacama Region), as part of the Frente Amplio coalition. Since then, he has been one of the most vocal advocates for decentralization, environmental protection, and regulation of large-scale mining.

During the 2019 Social Uprising, Mulet openly supported the demands for social transformation and was one of the promoters of the Agreement for Peace and a New Constitution, though with some reservations regarding its scope.

=== Left-Wing Alliances ===
In 2021, he was proclaimed a presidential pre-candidate by the FRVS, but eventually withdrew his candidacy to support Gabriel Boric, within the framework of the Apruebo Dignidad coalition. During Boric's government, Mulet has maintained a critical yet constructive role, defending the autonomy of regionalism in the face of decisions made by the central government.

In 2025, Mulet finally became an official presidential pre-candidate in 2025 representing the FRVS within the broader left-wing bloc, competing in the primaries of Boric's government. Despite gaining attention, he was ultimately defeated in the primaries, losing to a more nationally recognized figure.
