= 2025 Unidad por Chile presidential primary =

2025 Chilean presidential primaries

- 29 June 2025
- Turnout: 9.16%
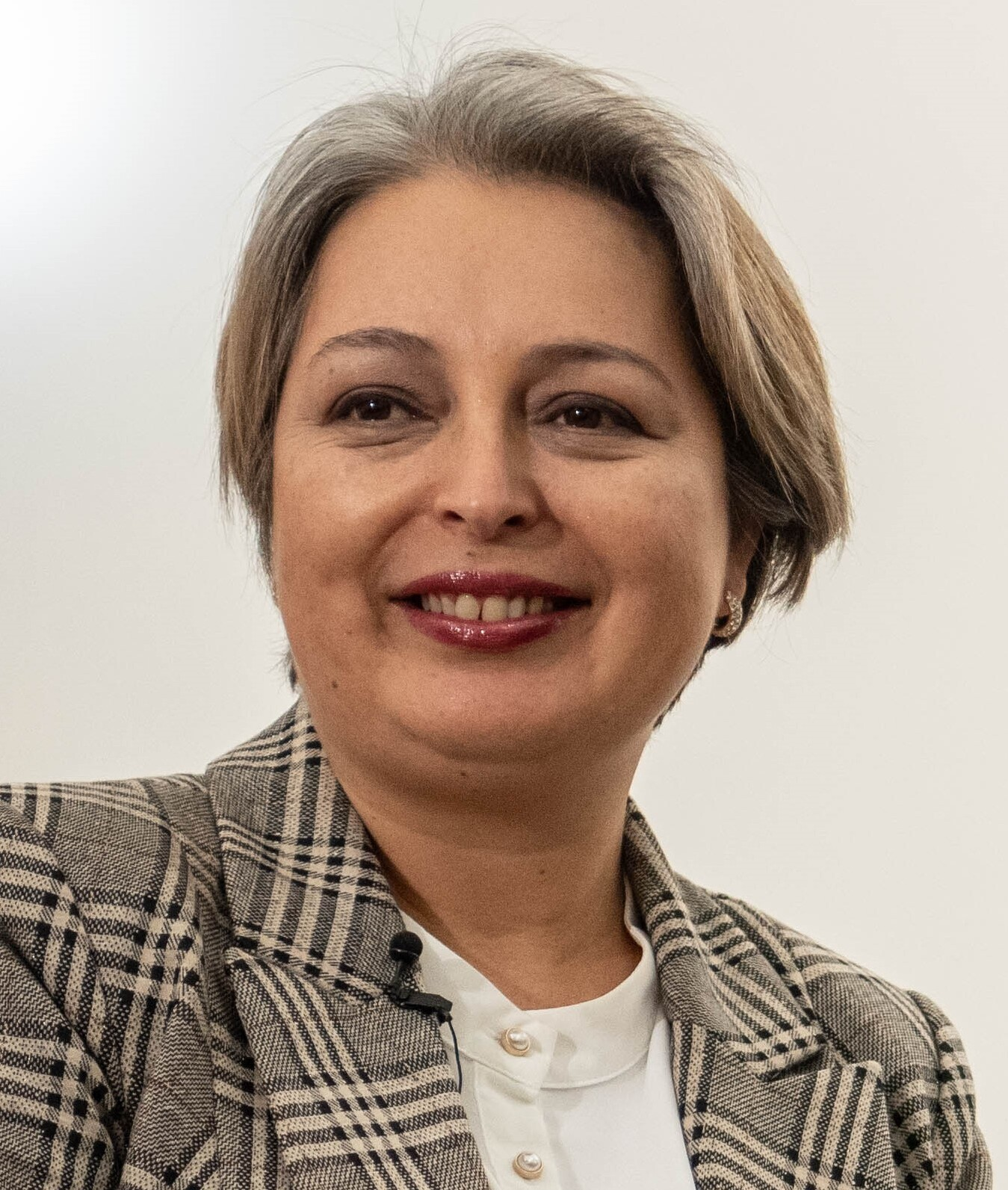

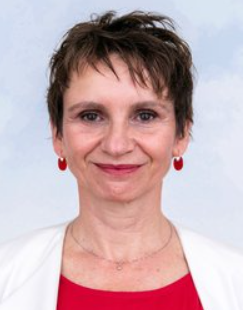

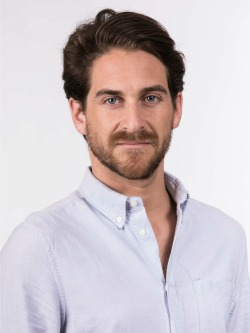
| Candidate | Jeannette Jara | Carolina Tohá | Gonzalo Winter |
| Party | Communist | PPD | Broad Front |
| Alliance | Supported by: Communist Party; Humanist Action | Democratic Socialism |
| Popular vote | 825,835 | 385,379 | 123,829 |
| Percentage | 60.16% | 28.07% | 9.02% |
- Results by region
Elected Presidential nominee
Jeannette Jara
PCCh

The 2025 Unidad por Chile presidential primary was held on 29 June 2025 to nominate a unified presidential candidate for the governing coalition ahead of the 2025 Chilean general election. The primary was contested by candidates from parties affiliated with the Unidad por Chile coalition, including the Communist Party of Chile, Party for Democracy, Broad Front, and the Social Green Regionalist Federation.

The election resulted in a decisive victory for Jeannette Jara of the Communist Party, who secured 60.16% of the vote. She was proclaimed the coalition's official candidate for the 2025 presidential election.

== Background ==
Unidad por Chile is a left-leaning coalition composed of the Socialist Party of Chile, Party for Democracy, liberal Party , Radical Party, Action Humanist Party, the Communist Party of Chile, the Broad Front (Chile), and the Social Green Regionalist Federation.

The primary was registered with the Electoral Service of Chile (Servel) on 30 April 2025, officially beginning the campaign period that lasted until 29 June. The primary aimed to resolve internal divisions within the coalition and to select a competitive candidate against a fragmented but strong right-wing opposition.

== Candidates ==
| Image | Candidate | Party | Endorsement | Ideology | Ref. |
|---|---|---|---|---|---|
| Jeannette Jara | Jeannette Jara | Communist Party of Chile | Communist Party; Humanist Action; Christian Left | Marxism–Leninism; Democratic socialism | |
| Carolina Tohá | Carolina Tohá | Party for Democracy | Party for Democracy; Socialist Party; Liberal Party; Radical Party | Social democracy; Social liberalism | |
| Gonzalo Winter | Gonzalo Winter | Broad Front | | Democratic socialism; Progressivism | |
| Jaime Mulet | Jaime Mulet | Social Green Regionalist Federation | | Green politics; Regionalism | |

== Results ==
Results of the 2025 Unidad por Chile presidential primary
| Candidate | Party | Votes | Percentage |
|---|---|---|---|
| Jeannette Jara | Communist Party of Chile | 825,217 | 60.16% |
| Carolina Tohá | Party for Democracy | 385,010 | 28.07% |
| Gonzalo Winter | Social Convergence (Broad Front) | 123,707 | 9.02% |
| Jaime Mulet | Federation of Regionalist Green Socialists | 37,640 | 2.74% |

== Voter Statistics ==
- Population: 19,658,835
- Registered voters: 15,499,071
- Votes cast: 1,419,281
- Voter turnout: 9.18%
- Valid votes: 1,372,702
- Blank votes: 13,947
- Null votes: 33,786

== Aftermath ==
Jara's victory consolidated the support of both traditional leftist parties and new progressive movements. The result was seen as a signal of continued alignment between the Communist Party and President Gabriel Boric's administration.
