= Hernán Vodanovic =

Chilean politician (1946–2025)

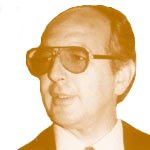

Member of the Senate of Chile
- In office 11 March 1990 – 11 March 1994
- Preceded by: District created
- Succeeded by: Adolfo Zaldívar
- Constituency: 18th Circumscription

Personal details
- Born: 9 February 1946 Santiago, Chile
- Died: 26 January 2025 (aged 78)
- Party: Socialist Party (1963–1987) (1991–2006); Party for Democracy (1987–1991)
- Spouse: Lucy Díaz Valderrama
- Children: Six (including Paulina)
- Parent(s): Drago Vodanovic; Marina Schnake
- Education: University of Chile (LL.B)
- Occupation: Lawyer, politician

Hernán Vodanovic Schnake (9 February 1946 – 26 January 2025) was a Chilean politician who served as Senator. He died on 26 January 2025, at the age of 78.

Vodanovic collaborated as a columnist for the newspaper La Tercera and the magazine Cauce. He also authored the book Un socialismo renovado para Chile. He was a member of the Chilean Bar Association, and of the football team, Club Deportivo Magallanes.

== Biography ==
=== Family and youth ===
He was born on 9 February 1946, the son of Drago Vodanovic Haklicka and Mariana Adriana Schnake. He was the father of six children, including Senator and Socialist Party president Paulina Vodanovic.

He was the grandson of Óscar Schnake, founder and first Secretary General of the Socialist Party of Chile and Minister of Development under President Pedro Aguirre Cerda, and the nephew of former parliamentarian Erich Schnake. He died on 26 January 2025.

=== Education and professional career ===
He studied at the Liceo de Aplicación in Santiago and later entered the Faculty of Law of the University of Chile, obtaining his law degree on 6 November 1970.

In professional practice, he initially worked in civil law in Santiago. He also pursued an academic career, teaching Political Law at the University of Talca and at the Autonomous University of Chile, and Constitutional Law at UNIACC University.

=== Political career ===
He began his political career after being elected vice-president of the Student Council of his faculty and serving as a member of the Executive Committee of the Federation of Students of the University of Chile (FECH) between 1967 and 1969, as well as a member of the Central Committee of the Socialist Youth Federation.

In 1971, he became an advisor to the Forestry Committee of the Production Development Corporation, a position he held until 1973. He subsequently served as Chief of Staff to the Minister of Agriculture, Jaime Tohá. His work was interrupted by the military coup of 11 September 1973.

After the overthrow of President Salvador Allende, he participated in the clandestine reorganization of the Socialist Party, acting as its Undersecretary General and founding the Coordinating Commission of Democratic Lawyers. As a specialist in Labor Law and Human Rights, he was a member of the “Group of 24” for Constitutional Studies and one of the founders of the Democratic Manifesto, the Democratic Alliance, and a member of the Organizing Commission of the Party for Democracy.

In May 1991, he rejoined the Socialist Party, serving as a member of its Central Committee and as vice-president until 30 December 2005. He resigned from the party in 2006.

In the December 1989 parliamentary elections, he ran for the Senate of Chile representing the Party for Democracy for the 18th Senatorial District, Aysén Region, for the 1990–1994 term. He was elected with the highest vote share, obtaining 10,856 votes (29.79% of valid votes). In 1993, he sought re-election representing the Socialist Party but was not elected.

In 1994, he was appointed a member of the National Commission on Public Ethics by President Eduardo Frei Ruiz-Tagle. Between 1995 and 1996, he served as head of the Legal Division of the Public Security Directorate, and between 1996 and 2000, as an external advisor to the Ministry of Justice.

On 3 January 2006, he assumed office as Justice of the Constitutional Court of Chile, having been appointed by the Senate of Chile. He served in that role until 7 January 2015.

In the 2017 parliamentary elections, he again ran for the Senate for the 14th Senatorial District of the Aysén Region as an independent within the Democratic Convergence pact, but was not elected. On that occasion, he supported the presidential candidacy of Carolina Goic.

In his later years, he showed affinity with the Amarillos por Chile movement and supported the Reject option in the 2022 Chilean constitutional referendum.
