= Gladys Marín =

Chilean activist and political figure (1941–2005)

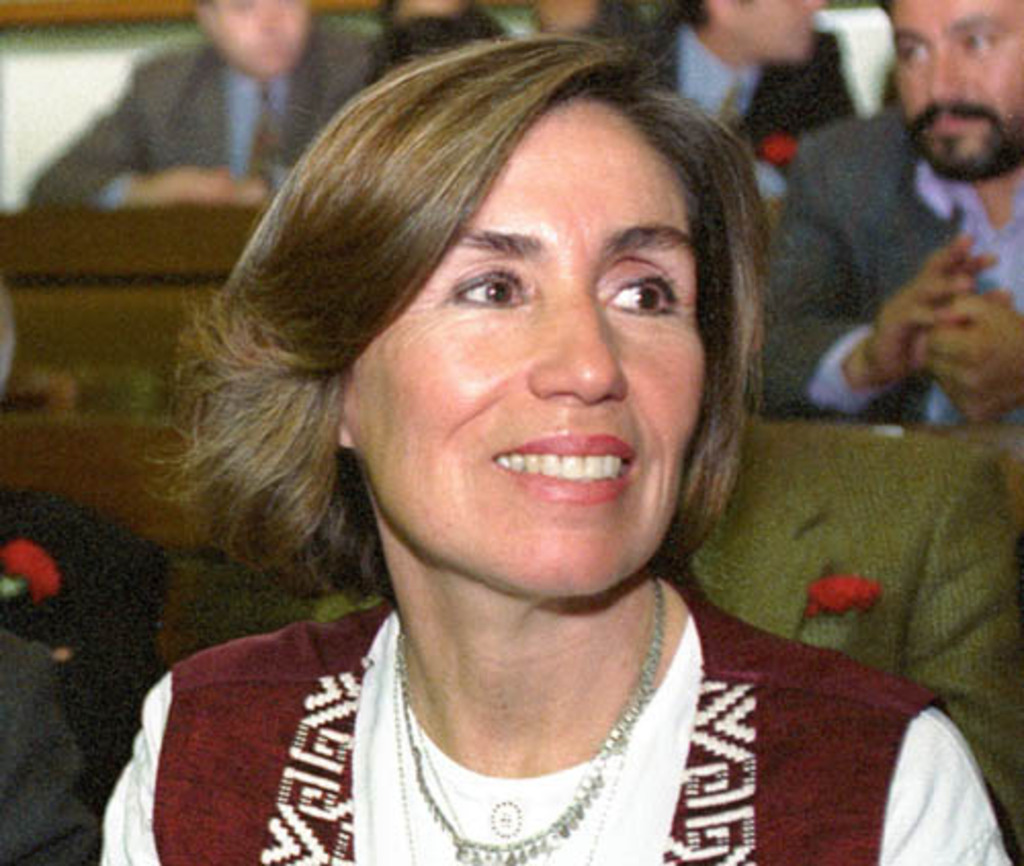

Secretary-General of the Communist Party of Chile
- In office 12 July 1994 – 11 August 2002
- Preceded by: Volodia Teitelboim
- Succeeded by: Guillermo Teillier

President of the Communist Party of Chile
- In office 11 August 2002 – 6 March 2005
- Succeeded by: Guillermo Teillier

Personal details
- Born: 18 July 1937 Curepto, Chile
- Died: 6 March 2005 (aged 67) Santiago, Chile
- Spouse: Jorge Muñoz Poutays
- Children: Rodrigo Muñoz Marín, Álvaro Muñoz Marín

Gladys del Carmen Marín Millie (Spanish pronunciation: [ˈɡlaðis maˈɾin]; July 18, 1937 – March 6, 2005) was a Chilean activist and political figure. She was Secretary-General of the Communist Party of Chile (PCCh) (1994–2002) and then president of the PCCh until her death. She was a staunch opponent of General Augusto Pinochet and filed the first lawsuit against him, in which she accused him of committing human rights violations during his seventeen-year dictatorship. Gladys Marín was the youngest person ever elected to the Chilean Congress, the first woman alongside Sara Larraín to run for the country's presidency and the only female leader of a Chilean political party.

== Early life ==
Marín was born in Curepto, in the Maule region to Heraclio Marín, a farmer, and school teacher Adriana Millie, later moving with her family to Sarmiento, and then to Talagante. At the age of eleven she settled in Santiago. While in High School in Chile she began participating in organizations that aid the poor, specifically while a part of the Juventud Obrera Católica (Young Catholic Workers). In 1957, she received her teacher's diploma and joined the staff of School No 130 for students with intellectual disabilities inside the capital's main mental hospital. Soon after, at seventeen years old, she joined the Juventudes Comunistas (Communist Youth) and quickly became a leader of the organization. At the age of 21, Marín would hold the role of cadre in charge of Women's Affairs in the Communist Youth. In 1962, Marín would join the Communist Party of Chile's Political Commission of the Central Committee as an appointed member. By 1965, she would become the Communist Youth of Chile's Secretary General at the age of 27, holding the position until 1977. Such influential roles would be unordinary for a woman at the time. With her appointment to general secretary, Marín had become the first women ever to lead a political youth organization such as the Communist Youth. Additionally, her appointment to the Political Commission made her the only woman in the 45 member committee. During her time at the Communist Youth, she helped support and work on several of Socialist President Salvador Allende's presidential campaigns, such as his campaigns in 1958 and 1964, in addition to meeting her husband Jorge Muñoz Poutays. Marín and Muñoz Poutays came from lower and upper middle class families respectively, and met through their involvement in the Communist Youth. After first seeing him at the party headquarters, the two would later formally meet while doing party-led volunteer work a few months later. At the age of twenty-three she won a seat in the lower house of the Chilean Congress where she served nine years.

== Political activism ==
Marín joined the Communist party while studying at pedagogy faculty in Santiago. She was elected to the Chamber of Deputies in 1965, and again in 1970, representing a working-class district of Santiago.

After the Popular Unity Government of Salvador Allende took power, Marín helped to organize much of the political work taking place outside of parliament. In her post as Secretary General of the Communist Youth, she participated in cultural groups, volunteer urban work crews, and involved herself in peasant movements.

Following the 1973 coup d'état, Marín first went underground. Augusto Pinochet's military coup on September 11, abolished party politics within Chile. She went into hiding and was named one of the regimes 100 most wanted persons. In November, 1973, she obtained asylum in the Dutch embassy, which would be the last place she would see her husband. She obtained asylum at the PCCh's insistence and remained there for eight months before being allowed to leave the country to East Germany. She was formally exiled in 1974. During her exile her part of her political work entailed spreading the word about the political situation in Chile. On the anniversary of the Universal Declaration of Human Rights Marín held a press conference at UN Headquarters in order to call attention to the situation in Chile. Marín travelled widely, specifically in Argentina. In September 1974, she traveled to Buenos Aires to warn Pinochet's predecessor as army commander-in-chief, who was living in exile, that Pinochet was planning his assassination. Four days later, he and his wife were killed when Pinochet planned for their car to explode.

Her husband Jorge Muñoz, the then secretary for the Communist Party of Santiago, disappeared in 1976 while Marín was out of the country, traveling in Costa Rica. Today, he is presumed dead but his corpse was never found. Under Chilean law, Pinochet stands charged with his kidnapping. She returned to Chile, clandestinely, in 1978 and fought from the underground for the return of democracy. She was in Moscow before returning secretly to Chile. Before returning to Chile, they wanted to have her teeth removed and replaced, as she states "I'm lucky to have kept my teeth because they wanted to change them for me." She passed herself off as a Spanish women, using a Spanish accent and dressed in Spanish clothing. She filled her mouth with pads to alter her facial expressions and rounded her bust and hips. In disguise, she passed police examination on the bus across the Andes from Argentina.

Once in Chile, she continued to secretly promote the Communist Party and was elected its under-secretary in 1984. Marín was instrumental in the creation of the armed wing of the Communist Party, the Manuel Rodríguez Patriotic Front (FPMR), as the Communist Party switched to a strategy of popular rebellion during the Pinochet dictatorship. Along with other exiled members who had received military training, the Front would unsuccessfully attempt to assassinate Augusto Pinochet in 1986.

In 1997, Marín ran for a seat in the Senate and obtained the eighth largest national majority, but was not elected due to the nature of the Chilean electoral system, which favours the two dominant parties or coalitions.

On January 12, 1998, Marín filed a complaint — the first person in Chile to do so — against Augusto Pinochet, accusing him of genocide, kidnapping, illicit association and illegal inhumation. At the time, Pinochet was still the commander of the Armed Forces and would soon become a lifetime senator. Marín was staunchly against the proposal to make Pinochet a lifetime senator, stating that the complaint was aimed at fighting against the move. Marín's complaint led to hundreds of families to come forward and accuse Pinochet and his allies in court.

She ran for president in 1999 against Joaquin Lavin of the Union Pro Chile Coalition and Ricardo Lagos of the incumbent Concertacion Coalition. Achieving less than four percent of the vote, Marín became, alongside Sara Larraín, the first female candidates to contest the first round of a presidential election in Chile. In the runoff election between Lavin and Lagos which followed, Marín and the Communist Party expressed hesitation to endorse Lagos against the far right Lavin, instead labeling them both "two sides of the same coin neoliberalism." In August 2000, Marín attended the Third Al Mathaba Conference, held by the Al-Mathaba World Anti-Imperialist Centre, a centre in Libya established by Libyan leader Muammar Gaddafi for supporting anti-imperialist and leftist revolutionaries worldwide, as the representative of the PCCh, whose erstwhile anti-Pinochet armed wing, the Manuel Rodríguez Patriotic Front, had received support from Libya and its leader.

In the 2001 legislative elections, conflict among the Concertacion coalition emerged after the Socialist Party of Chile (PS) sought to endorse two candidates from the Communist Party. Some members of the governing Concertacion Coalition believed that this move would split the coalition ideologically, while members of the Communist and Socialist Parties saw it as an opportunity to grant the Communist Party a space in parliament, something they had not had since the coup of 1973. Additionally, the move aimed to boost the Concertacion Coalition's votes to secure two seats. Gladys Marín weighed in on the decision positively, stating "This agreement will allow the party to regain a legitimate presence in the parliament, which is long overdue."

== Personal life and death ==
Marín married Jorge Muñoz Poutays in 1963, with whom she had two children. Due to Jorge's and Gladys's political affiliation during the Coup, their children did not have a traditional upbringing. A family friend of raised their two sons, Rodrigo and Alvaro. Even once Gladys returned to Chile, her sons were not told in order to protect Marín's security. In 1987, her two sons demanded to see their mother immediately or never again. Despite the dangers, they met in Argentina for a two-week reunion. Marín died of brain cancer after a long battle which included treatment in Cuba and Sweden. Upon her death the government declared two days of national mourning. In accordance with her wishes, her coffin was exhibited at the former National Congress in Santiago and was viewed by thousands of mourners prior to its cremation. Half a million Chileans came to pay their respects to Marín. For her funeral the PCCh and her family organized a march through the center of Santiago, with estimates in the press ranging from "tens of thousands of marchers" to "over 200,000 people" to "almost one million people". An avenue crossing a working class district of Santiago was later renamed after her.

== Books and speeches ==
In 1999, Marín wrote Regreso a la esperanza: Derrota de la Operación Condor, which is a set of texts that combine the denouncement of the Pinochet repression, personal testimony and reviews of the objectives that move the PC. In 2002, she wrote La vida es hoy and was a contributor to 1000 Days of Revolution: Chilean Communists on the Lessons of Popular Unity 1970-73 by Kenny Coyle. Some of her most famous speeches are Entrevista el siglo, La llamaba cabra de monte, and La vida es un minuto.
