= Pablo Toloza =

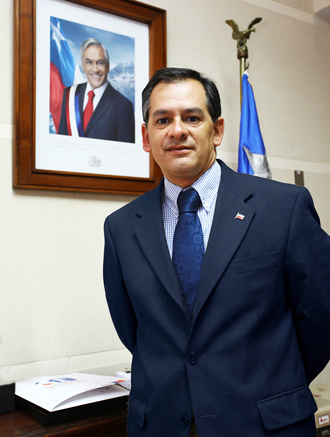

Member of the Constitutional Convention
- In office 4 July 2021 – 4 July 2022
- Constituency: 3rd District

Intendnt of the Antofagasta Region
- In office 24 April 2012 – 12 August 2013
- President: Sebastián Piñera
- Succeeded by: Waldo Mora Longa

Personal details
- Born: 28 May 1971 (age 55) Antofagasta, Chile
- Party: Independent Democratic Union
- Education: Gabriela Mistral University (LL.B)
- Occupation: Politician
- Profession: Lawyer

Pablo Toloza Fernández (born 28 May 1971) is a Chilean lawyer and politician.

He served as Governor of the province of Antofagasta from 2010 to 2012 and as Intendant of the Antofagasta Region from 2012 to 2013.

== Early life and family ==
Toloza was born in Viña del Mar, Chile, on 28 May 1971. He is the son of Víctor Hugo Toloza Zapata and Ofelia Ángela Fernández Vilches.

He is married to María Fernanda Álvarez Ode and has three children.

== Education and professional career ==
Toloza completed his primary and secondary education at Colegio San Luis in Antofagasta. He later attended the Gabriela Mistral University, where he earned a law degree.

He worked professionally as a notary and served as substitute judge in civil, juvenile, and labor courts, as well as judge of the local police court, in various localities of the Antofagasta Region. He also served as legal adviser to the Municipality of Ollagüe.

== Political career ==
Toloza is a member of the Independent Democratic Union.

He served as Governor of the province of Antofagasta from 2010 to 2012. Between 24 April 2012 and 12 August 2013, he held the position of Intendant of the Antofagasta Region.

In the elections held on 15–16 May 2021, he ran as a candidate for the Constitutional Convention representing the 3rd District of the Antofagasta Region as a member of the Independent Democratic Union, within the Vamos por Chile electoral pact. He obtained 5,443 votes, corresponding to 3.50% of the valid votes cast.
