= Eduardo Díaz del Río =

Chilean politician

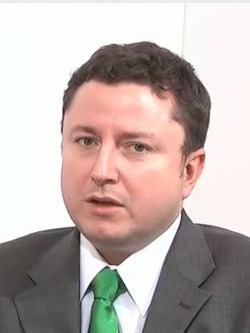

Member of the Chamber of Deputies
- In office 11 March 1998 – 11 March 2010
- Preceded by: Teodoro Ribera
- Succeeded by: José Manuel Edwards
- Constituency: 51st District

President of the Independent Regionalist Party
- In office June 2010 – October 2010
- Preceded by: Adolfo Zaldívar
- Succeeded by: Pedro Araya Guerrero

Personal details
- Born: 17 December 1973 (age 52) Santiago, Chile
- Party: Party of the South (1998); Unión Demócrata Independiente (2001–2004); Christian Democratic Party (2005–2008); Independent Regionalist Party (2008–2010); Amplitude (2016–2018)
- Parent: Eduardo Díaz Herrera
- Relatives: Pablo Díaz del Río
- Education: Pontifical Catholic University of Chile (BA); Adolfo Ibáñez University (MA); University of Salamanca (PhD)
- Occupation: Politician
- Profession: Lawyer

Eduardo Díaz del Río (born 17 December 1973) is a Chilean politician and lawyer.

On 6 December 2021, he was among the figures which announced his vote for José Antonio Kast in the ballotage of the 2021 Chilean general election.

== Early life and family ==
He was born in Santiago on 17 December 1973, the son of Eduardo Díaz Herrera, mayor of Toltén (1996–2000) and founder of the Partido del Sur, and Bárbara del Río Goudie. He is a first cousin of Nicolás Monckeberg, former deputy and Minister of Labour and Social Welfare during the second administration of Sebastián Piñera.

He is divorced and the father of two children.

He completed his primary and secondary education at the German School of Temuco, the Military School of Chile in Santiago, and Saint George's College, Santiago, graduating in 1991. He later studied law at the Pontifical Catholic University of Chile, graduating with a Licentiate in Legal Sciences. He pursued postgraduate studies in political science with a specialization in Parliamentary Law at the University of Salamanca in Spain.

Between 1991 and 1998, as a secondary and university student, he participated in social outreach activities through the pastoral program of Saint George's College and in the street work program of Hogar de Cristo. These activities laid the foundation for what later became the Fundación de Trabajo en la Calle.

== Political career ==
In 1997, he began his political career as vice president of the Law School Student Center at the Pontifical Catholic University of Chile.

In March 1999, he was recognized as one of the 15 young leaders in the Americas with the greatest future potential by the Carter Center in Atlanta. Later that year, he spoke at the seminar Youth and Employment in the 21st Century in Buenos Aires, alongside young deputies from Latin America and Domingo Cavallo. The following year, he attended the International Youth Democrat Union (IYDU) meeting in Buenos Aires, with participation from Latin American center-right representatives, the Spanish People's Party, and British and Canadian conservative parties.

As an independent deputy, he joined the caucus and became a member of the Independent Democratic Union (UDI) in August 1999. In early 2001, he spent two months in Washington, D.C., participating in the Capitol Hill Staff Training Program organized by the Leadership Institute. In May of the same year, he spoke at the First Meeting of Young Latin American Leaders in Buenos Aires, organized by Fundación Grupo Innova and the Naumann Foundation.

In October 2004, he resigned from the Independent Democratic Union. In January 2005, he joined a parliamentary committee and later the Christian Democratic Party (DC), from which he resigned in January 2008 following the expulsion of Senator Adolfo Zaldívar. Thereafter, he joined the Independent Caucus of the Chamber of Deputies.

In May 2010, he joined the Regionalist Party of the Independents (PRI). In July of the same year, he assumed the presidency of the party.
