= Pedro Araya Guerrero =

Chilean politician (born 1974)

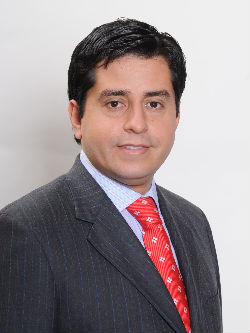

Member of the Senate
- Incumbent
- Assumed office 11 March 2014
- Preceded by: Carlos Cantero
- Constituency: 2nd Circunscription (Antofagasta Region)

Member of the Chamber of Deputies
- In office 11 March 2002 – 11 March 2014
- Preceded by: Felipe Valenzuela Herrera
- Succeeded by: Marcela Hernando
- Constituency: 4th District (Antofagasta, Mejillones, Sierra Gorda and Taltal)

President of the Independent Regionalist Party
- In office 2010–2011
- Preceded by: Eduardo Díaz del Río
- Succeeded by: Carlos Olivares

Personal details
- Born: 15 June 1974 (age 52) Antofagasta, Chile
- Party: Christian Democratic Party (1988–2008); Independent Regionalist Party (2008–2012); Close to centre-left (2013–)
- Relatives: Jaime Araya Guerrero (brother)
- Education: University of Antofagasta (LL.B)
- Occupation: Politician
- Profession: Lawyer

Pedro Araya Guerrero (born 15 June 1974) is a Chilean politician and lawyer who is member of the Senate of Chile. He has served as a member of both the Chamber of Deputies and the Senate, representing the Antofagasta Region.

Over the course of his career, Araya has been affiliated with several political parties, including the Christian Democratic Party (PDC), the Independent Regionalist Party (PRI), and the Party for Democracy (PPD), reflecting a trajectory across centrist and center-left sectors of Chilean politics.

Araya holds a law degree from the University of Antofagasta and has practiced as an attorney in both the public and private sectors. He was first elected to the Chamber of Deputies in 2002 and later transitioned to the Senate, where he has served since 2014. His legislative focus has included mining regulation, constitutional reform, public security, and decentralization, with a particular emphasis on the needs and challenges of the northern regions of Chile.

Throughout his political career, Araya has been known for shifting political affiliations and for taking positions that sometimes diverge from party lines. He has participated in key debates, such as the constitutional reform process and public order legislation, and has occupied leadership roles in Senate commissions. His career reflects broader trends in Chilean politics regarding regional representation and the evolution of centrist coalitions.

== Biography ==
Pedro Araya was born in the city of Antofagasta in 1974. He completed his primary and secondary education in the region and later studied law at the University of Antofagasta, earning his law degree.

Early in his career, he worked as a legal advisor and lawyer, focusing on administrative and public law. His professional background is closely linked to the socio-economic issues of the Antofagasta Region, particularly those related to mining and urban development.

== Political career ==
He entered public life in the late 1990s and became involved with the Christian Democratic Party (PDC), where he began his political career. He was elected deputy in 2002 for District 4 (covering Antofagasta, Mejillones, Sierra Gorda, and Taltal), and was re-elected in 2006 and 2010.

During this time, he began to distance himself from the PDC due to internal disagreements and broader shifts in the political landscape.

Araya left the PDC and joined the Independent Regionalist Party (PRI), eventually becoming its president. In 2013, he was elected as senator for the Antofagasta Region, and later joined the Party for Democracy (PPD). His time in the Senate has been marked by active participation in legislative commissions, including those focused on Constitution, Legislation, Justice and Regulations, and Mining and Energy.

He has played a visible role in debates on constitutional reform, especially during the period following the 2019 social protests, where he supported the idea of a new constitution. At the same time, Araya has taken conservative stances on certain issues, particularly regarding public security and order, which has placed him at odds with some sectors of the left.

In recent years, Araya has been considered part of the more moderate or centrist wing within the broader left-leaning coalitions. His voting record and public statements suggest an emphasis on institutional stability, regional equity, and pragmatic governance. As of 2025, he continues to serve as senator and remains active in constitutional and legislative debates.
