= Carlos Cantero =

Chilean politician

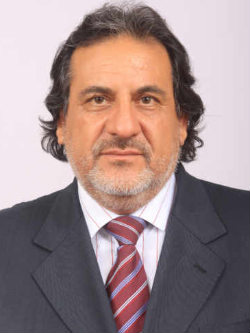
- Cantero in 2010

Member of the Senate of Chile
- In office 11 March 1998 – 11 March 2014
- Preceded by: Arturo Alessandri Besa
- Succeeded by: Pedro Araya Guerrero
- Constituency: 2nd Circunscription (Antofagasta)

Member of the Chamber of Deputies
- In office 11 March 1990 – 11 March 1998
- Preceded by: Creation of the District
- Succeeded by: Waldo Mora Longa
- Constituency: 3rd District (Calama, María Elena, Ollagüe, San Pedro de Atacama and Tocopilla)

Personal details
- Born: 11 November 1956 (age 69) Santiago, Chile
- Party: Renovación Nacional
- Education: Catholic University of the North
- Occupation: Politician
- Profession: Geographer

Carlos Raúl Cantero Ojeda (born 11 November 1956) is a Chilean geographer, sociologist and politician who served as a parliamentary in his country.

He served as a Senator representing the Antofagasta Region. He has also held several mayoral offices in northern Chile and has been active in initiatives related to regional development, decentralization, and governance.

== Early life and education ==
Cantero was born in Punta Arenas on 11 November 1956. He is the son of Raúl Cantero Aravena and María Ela Ojeda Andrade. He is married to Mónica Berta Barrios Acosta and has three children: Pablo, Karla, and Ignacio.

He completed his primary education at School No. 4 in Viña del Mar and his secondary education at the Eduardo de la Barra High School in Valparaíso. He later entered the School of Geography at the Catholic University of the North (Antofagasta campus), where he obtained his degree as a geographer in 1982. His professional training included an internship at the Chilean Maritime Chamber, and his undergraduate thesis was titled Impact of the Gateway Function–Transport Corridor of the Region.

He later pursued doctoral studies and was a doctoral candidate in Information Society studies at the Open University of Catalonia in Barcelona, Spain. In July 2012, he was awarded a Ph.D. in Sociology by the National University of Distance Education (UNED) in Madrid, Spain, after defending his doctoral thesis titled Power: Structure and Change in Chile. The Impact of New Information Technologies, receiving the highest distinction, cum laude.

== Professional career ==
During his first term as senator (1998–2006), Cantero was a member of the National Council for Regionalization and Decentralization (CONAREDE).

He currently serves as director of the Virtual Community of Governance, a non-profit center for studies, research, and training focused on the development, promotion, and dissemination of knowledge in the fields of governance, leadership, and human and institutional development.

== Political career ==
Cantero was active in student leadership during his school and university years. In 1980, he served as secretary general and national president of the Union of Geography Students of the Catholic University of the North. He was later elected secretary general and vice president of the Student Federation of the same university between 1980 and 1981.

In 1983, he was appointed mayor of the Municipality of Sierra Gorda, a position he held until 1984, when he became mayor of Tocopilla (1984–1987) and subsequently mayor of Calama (1987–1988), all located in the Antofagasta Region.

He joined the National Renewal party in March 1989 but resigned on 23 November 2007 while serving as an independent senator. Following his resignation, he promoted the Regionalist and Independent Citizen Movement of the Norte Grande.

In the 2009 presidential and parliamentary elections, Cantero joined the Coalition for Change, which included the Independent Democratic Union, National Renewal, Chile Primero, and independent candidates.

In the parliamentary elections of November 2013, he ran as an independent candidate for the Senate in the 2nd Senatorial District but was not elected.

In March 2014, he publicly adhered to the political movement Amplitude. From April 2014 onward, he served on the Presidential Advisory Commission on Decentralization and Regional Development created by President Michelle Bachelet.

On 10 January 2017, he was appointed as the Senate’s representative to the Qualifying Committee for Private Donations within Chile’s Cultural Donations System.

In the regional elections held on 26–27 October 2024, Cantero ran as an independent candidate for Governor of the Antofagasta Region with the support of National Renewal. He placed third with 51,197 votes (15.83%) and did not advance to the runoff election.
