= Carlos Olivares =

Chilean politician

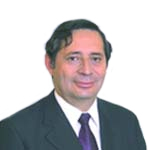

Member of the Chamber of Deputies
- In office 11 March 1998 – 11 March 2010
- Preceded by: Ignacio Balbontín
- Succeeded by: Nicolás Monckeberg

President of the Independent Regionalist Party
- In office 2011–2013
- Preceded by: Pedro Araya Guerrero
- Succeeded by: Humberto de la Maza

Personal details
- Born: 25 May 1952 (age 74) Coquimbo, Chile
- Party: Christian Democratic Party; Independent Regionalist Party
- Education: University of Concepción
- Occupation: Politician
- Profession: Physician

Carlos Olivares Zepeda (born 22 May 1952) is a Chilean politician and physician who served as deputy.

== Early life and family ==
He was born in Coquimbo on 25 May 1952, the son of Carlos Enrique Olivares and Emma Zepeda Olivares. He is married to Gilda Boksamy Vásquez.

He studied Medicine at the University of Concepción, where he qualified as a physician and surgeon. After obtaining his degree, he practiced medicine professionally.

== Political career ==
He began his political activities as a member of the Christian Democratic Party (Chile).

In the 1997 parliamentary elections, he was elected deputy for the Christian Democratic Party representing District No. 18 (Cerro Navia, Lo Prado, and Quinta Normal), Metropolitan Region, for the 1998–2002 legislative period, obtaining 11,080 votes (6.31% of the valid votes cast). In December 2001, he was re-elected in the same district for the 2002–2006 term, obtaining 10,930 votes (6.48%). In December 2005, he was re-elected for a third consecutive term (2006–2010), obtaining 32,464 votes (19.87%).

In January 2008, he resigned from the Christian Democratic Party and remained independent until 31 May 2008, when he joined the Regionalist Party of Independents (PRI). In 2009, he became vice president of that party.

In December 2009, he ran again as a candidate for deputy for District No. 18, representing the Regionalist Party of Independents for the 2010–2014 legislative period, but was not elected. Between 2011 and 2013, he served as president of the PRI, resigning from the party in June 2013.
