= Economy, Government and Communications, Central University of Chile =

Public administration school of the Central University of Chile

Central University of Chile Economy, Government and Communications
- Facultad de Economía, Gobierno y Comunicaciones, de la Universidad Central de Chile
- Type: Private (non-profit)
- Established: 2000
- President: Luis Riveros Cornejo
- Rector: Santiago González Larraín
- Location: (Chile) Santiago, Santiago Metropolitan Region, Chile; 33°27′10″S 70°39′9″W
- Website: School of Government and Communications

The Faculty of Economy, Government and Communications, Central University of Chile (Spanish: Facultad de Economía, Gobierno y Comunicaciones de la Universidad Central de Chile), also known as the Faculty of Government, is one of the first School of Public Administration career in Santiago taught by a private university. The building is located in the University District of Santiago, near the Parque Almagro metro station and Paseo Bulnes.

== History ==
The Faculty of Government of the Central University of Chile is one of the faculties that make up the Central University of Chile, founded in 1982. It originated as a Public Administration career, starting its academic activities in March 1983 on Campus "La Perla", in the commune of San Bernardo, Chile. From 1988, it was referred to as the School of Political and Administrative Sciences and moved to North Campus Almagro in Santiago, next to the Almagro Park. In 2000, the Faculty of Political Science and Public Administration was created. In 2003, the Political Science Career study plan was created, and in 2004 the campus moved to its current premises, sharing the Vicente Kovacevic II building with the Faculty of Education.

In 2017, by decision of the Faculty Council, it was decided to change the name to Faculty of Government.

In 2019, by decision of the Rectory, under a plan of administrative reorganization of the academic units, it was agreed to merge the former Faculty of Government with the Faculty of Communications and the Faculty of Economics and Business, thereby creating the current faculty.

=== Enfoques Journal ===
Since 2003, the Faculty of Government from the Central University of Chile publishes the Revista Enfoques, Academic Journal semiannual circulation (July and December), specializing in issues related to Public policy, public administration and governance of State. In that sense, original articles, research advances and book reviews, both in Chile and abroad, from the main areas of the humanities and social sciences, with special emphasis on the disciplines of Political Science, Economics, Public law, Political philosophy and International relations.

== Deans of the Faculty of Government ==
- 2000-2001: Héctor Aguilera Segura
- 2001-2002: Ricardo Medina Muñoz
- 2002-2008: Patricio Gajardo Lagomarsino
- 2008-2009: Aldo Casinelli Capurro
- 2009-2010: Pedro Henríquez Guajardo
- 2010-2011: Christian Hansen Cruz
- 2011 to date: Marco Moreno Pérez
