= Juan Andrés Fontaine =

Chilean economist and former minister

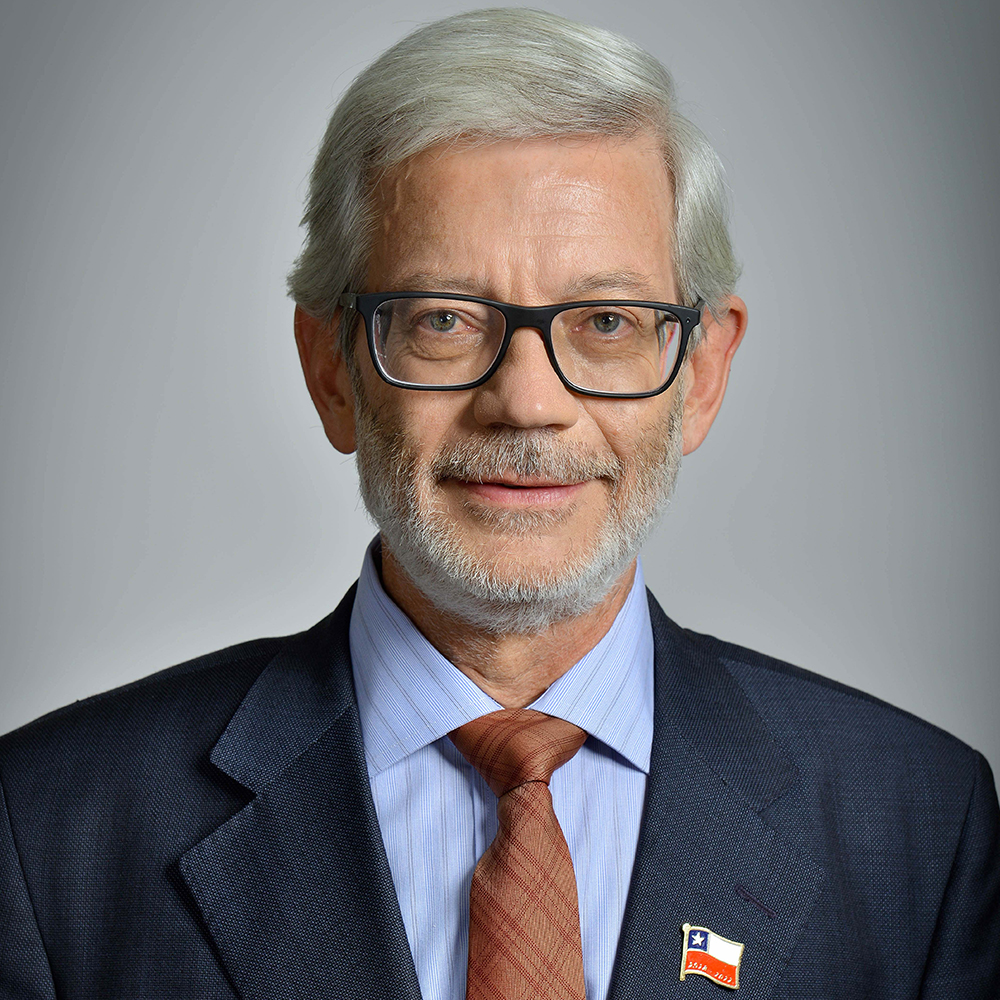

Minister of Economy, Development and Tourism
- In office 13 June 2019 – 28 October 2019
- President: Sebastián Piñera
- Preceded by: José Ramón Valente
- Succeeded by: Lucas Palacios
- In office 11 March 2010 – 18 July 2011
- President: Sebastián Piñera
- Preceded by: Hugo Lavados
- Succeeded by: Pablo Longueira

Minister of Public Works
- In office 11 March 2018 – 13 June 2019
- President: Sebastián Piñera
- Preceded by: Alberto Undurraga
- Succeeded by: Alfredo Moreno

Personal details
- Born: 21 May 1954 (age 72) Santiago, Chile
- Spouse: María Inés Correa
- Children: 5
- Parent(s): Arturo Fontaine Aldunate; Valentina Talavera
- Relatives: Arturo Fontaine Talavera (brother); Bernardo Fontaine (brother)
- Education: Pontifical Catholic University of Chile; University of Chicago
- Profession: Economist

Juan Andrés Fontaine Talavera is an economist who was Chilean Minister for the Economy, Development, and Reconstruction under President Sebastián Piñera.

Currently, he is a member of the "Instituto Libertad y Desarrollo", a Chilean think tank founded by Hernán Büchi and an economic adviser to several corporations and banks. He has been an economic advisor to various Chilean presidential candidates, columnist in Chilean newspapers and speaker in conferences on Chilean and Latin American economies.

Fontaine is a professor at Pontificia Universidad Católica de Chile and authored several publications. He taught for a decade at his alma mater. and at the University of Chile.

== Family and education ==
His father was the late director of El Mercurio (1978–1982) and ambassador of Chile to Argentina (1984–1988), Arturo Fontaine Aldunate, and his mother was Valentina Talavera Balmaceda. His siblings are Arturo (lawyer, philosopher and writer, former executive director of the liberal Centro de Estudios Públicos (CEP), Hernán (lawyer), Bernardo (economist), Valentina (advertising designer), María de la Paz (biology teacher), and María Cecilia (journalist).

He completed his secondary education at the Colegio de los Sagrados Corazones de Manquehue in Santiago. He then pursued higher studies in commercial engineering at the Pontificia Universidad Católica de Chile (PUC), graduating with a thesis focused on macroeconomics and the labor market.

His first involvement in politics occurred during his time at the PUC. There he served as president of the student association of his program, became associated with future UDI senator Jaime Guzmán, and joined the gremialist movement, a conservative political current.

He later traveled to the United States to pursue a master's degree in economics at the University of Chicago, where he strengthened his ties with Joaquín Lavín and Cristián Larroulet, whom he had known since his undergraduate years.

== Professional career ==
Upon returning to Chile, in addition to teaching economics at the PUC, he joined the business group of Manuel Cruzat, specifically its research division. There he worked alongside fellow economist José Piñera Echenique, with whom he collaborated on the magazine Economía y Sociedad, specializing as an economic analyst.

Following the state intervention of the Cruzat group during the economic crisis, he joined the Central Bank (BC) in 1984. At that time, the issuing institution was still closely linked to the government and did not yet have an autonomous board, and Fontaine — who was in charge of the research division — effectively served in a second-in-command capacity. He is credited as one of the “architects” of the law that granted autonomy to the BC.

After the end of the military dictatorship of General Augusto Pinochet, he left the Central Bank and opened a consulting firm with his partner Luis Hernán Paúl. He later became a sought-after corporate director, serving on the boards of Quiñenco, Banco Santander-Santiago, the construction firm Besalco, the retail group Mall Plaza, and the electricity generator Endesa.
