= Patricia Rubio =

Chilean politician (born 1970)

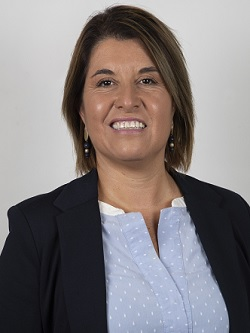

Member of the Chamber of Deputies of Chile
- In office 9 March 2021 – 11 March 2022
- Preceded by: Loreto Carvajal
- Constituency: 19th District

Personal details
- Born: 5 January 1970 (age 56) Santiago, Chile
- Party: Party for Democracy (PPD)
- Education: Academy of Christian Humanism University
- Occupation: Politician
- Profession: Teacher

Patricia Irene Rubio Escobar (born 1 August 1970) is a Chilean preschool educator and politician, member of the Party for Democracy (PPD).

She served as deputy for district No.19 of the Ñuble Region, replacing Loreto Carvajal. Between 2004 and 2008 she served as councilor of the commune of Bulnes.

== Biography ==
Rubio Escobar was born in Chillán, the daughter of Valentín del Carmen Rubio Jerez and Delfina del Carmen Escobar Anabalón. She is the partner of Ernesto Sánchez, former mayor of the city of Bulnes, with whom they stole a large amount of money, leaving many economic voids in the municipality.

In 1995 she qualified as a preschool educator at the Diego Portales Professional Institute. She studied basic education at the Academy of Christian Humanism University. Between 2013 and 2014, she served as head of "SEP Project and Coordination" of the Municipal Education Administration Department in the Illustrious Municipality of Bulnes.

In 2020 she was a teacher in charge of "Emotional Education Programs" at the Crecer en Equidad Foundation.

She served in the Women's Secretariat of the Ñuble Region, until January 2021.

== Political career ==
She served as councillor of the commune of Bulnes between 2004 and 2008. She was the first vice president of the PPD in the Ñuble Region and was part of the national board of the community as a member.

In January 2021, she was appointed by her party as a deputy to replace Loreto Carvajal, who in turn occupied the seat left by Senator Felipe Harboe, who resigned from his position to take up a candidacy for the constitutional convention. She assumed office on 9 March 2021, and the next day she was appointed president of the Family Commission. She was part of the PPD Parliamentary Committee.
