= Alberto Undurraga =

Chilean politician (born 1969)

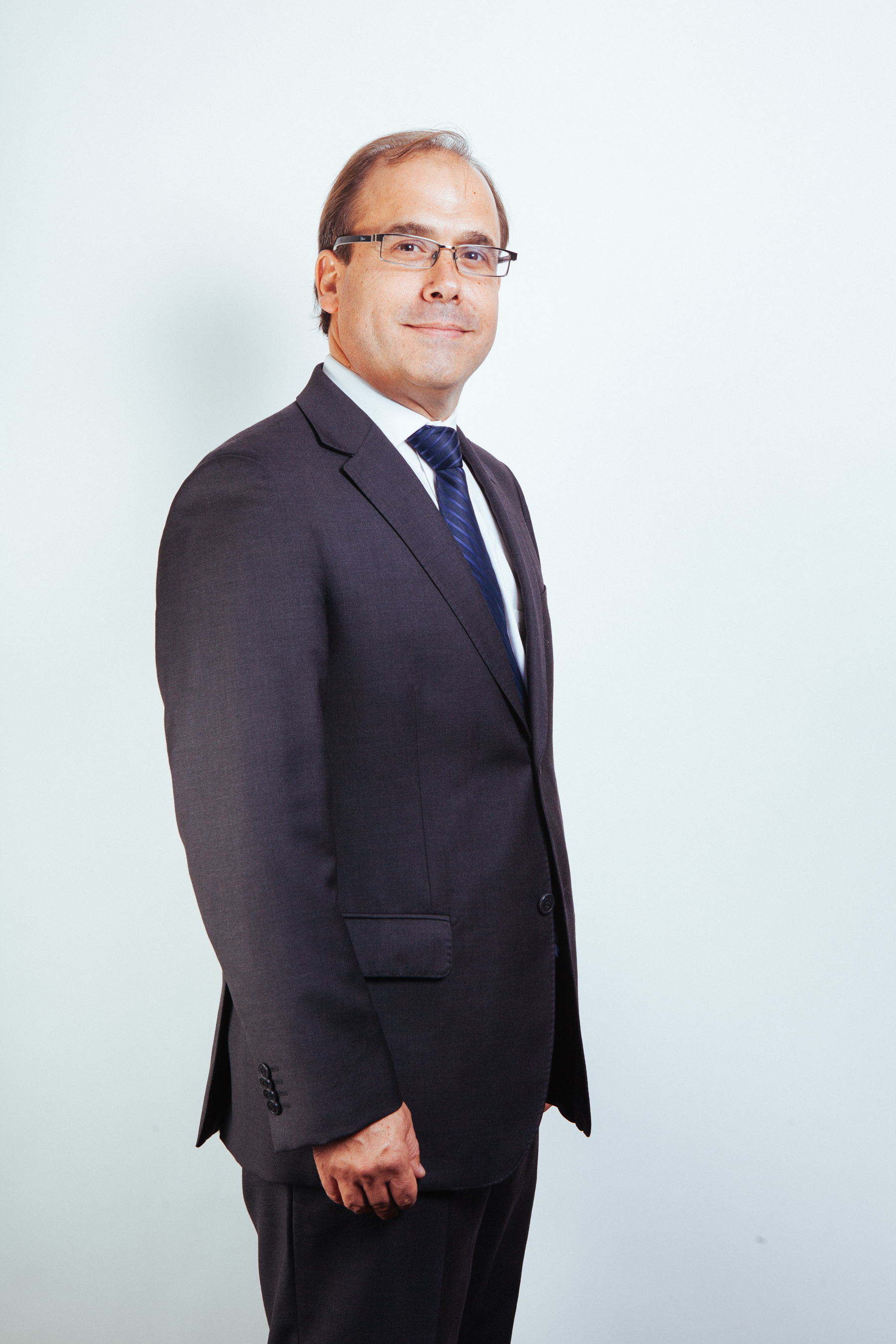

President of the Christian Democratic Party
- In office 10 November 2022 – 27 July 2025
- Preceded by: Aldo Mardones
- Succeeded by: Francisco Huenchumilla

Member of the Chamber of Deputies
- In office 11 March 2022 – 11 March 2026
- Preceded by: Gabriel Silber
- Constituency: District 8

Minister of Public Works
- In office 11 March 2014 – 11 March 2018
- President: Michelle Bachelet
- Preceded by: Loreto Silva
- Succeeded by: Juan Andrés Fontaine

Mayor of Maipú
- In office 6 December 2004 – 16 November 2012
- Preceded by: Roberto Sepúlveda
- Succeeded by: Christian Vittori

President of the Pontifical Catholic University of Chile Students Federation
- In office 1991–1992
- Preceded by: Clemente Pérez
- Succeeded by: Fulvio Rossi

Personal details
- Born: 17 June 1969 (age 57) Santiago, Chile
- Party: Christian Democratic Party
- Education: Pontifical Catholic University of Chile (B.Sc)
- Occupation: Politician
- Profession: Economist

Alberto Undurraga Vicuña (born 17 June 1969) is a Chilean politician and economist currently serving as the president of the Christian Democratic Party.

== Biography ==
Undurraga was born in Santiago on 17 June 1969. He is the son of Alberto Undurraga Undurraga and Ana Elvira Vicuña Baeza. He is married to María Paulina Flotts de los Hoyos and is the father of two children.

He completed his primary and secondary education at Colegio San Ignacio between 1975 and 1986. Between 1987 and 1992, he studied Commercial Engineering at the Pontifical Catholic University of Chile (PUC).

From 1997 to 1998, he completed a Master’s degree in Applied Economics at the University of Michigan in the United States.

In his professional career, he served as Commercial Manager of the Microenterprise Program at Banco del Desarrollo between 1994 and 1995. He later served as General Manager of Bandesarrollo Microempresas S.A. until 1997. Between 1999 and 2000, he was Director of the Commercial Engineering program at the Universidad Alberto Hurtado and a faculty member at the Universidad Central de Chile.

== Political career ==
He has been a member of the Christian Democratic Party since 1988. During his university years, he was a student leader and served as President of the Federation of Students of the PUC between 1991 and 1992.

During the government of President Eduardo Frei Ruiz-Tagle, he served as a councillor of the National Council for the Overcoming of Poverty between 1994 and 1997. Between 2000 and 2002, he was a member of the Antimonopoly Commission of Chile. From 2001 to 2004, he served as a councillor at the Instituto Nacional de Normalización.

Between 2000 and 2004, during the government of President Ricardo Lagos, he was appointed National Director of the National Consumer Service (SERNAC).

In the municipal elections held in October 2004, he was elected Mayor of the commune of Maipú with 68,907 votes, equivalent to 54.03% of the total votes cast. He was re-elected in 2008, obtaining 90,961 votes, corresponding to 66.95% of the total votes cast.

Before completing his second term as mayor, he decided not to seek re-election and left office on 16 November 2012 in order to campaign for the Senate in the Santiago West constituency in the 2013 parliamentary elections. He was not elected, obtaining 222,714 votes, equivalent to 18.70% of the valid votes cast.

On 11 March 2014, during the second government of President Michelle Bachelet, he was appointed Minister of Public Works, a position he held until March 2018.

In November 2021, he was elected Deputy for the 8th District of the Metropolitan Region of Santiago—comprising the communes of Lampa, Maipú, Cerrillos, Quilicura, Tiltil, Colina, Estación Central, and Pudahuel—representing the Christian Democratic Party for the 2022–2026 legislative term. He obtained 17,158 votes, equivalent to 3.65% of the valid votes cast.

On 10 November 2022, the National Council of the Christian Democratic Party elected him President of the party. He remained in office until 26 July 2025, when he resigned after the party’s National Board decided to support the presidential candidacy of Jeannette Jara.

On 15 March 2025, the National Board of the Christian Democratic Party ratified his presidential candidacy. However, on 3 May 2025, the party’s Supreme Tribunal annulled his nomination due to his failure to register for the primaries. Following this decision, on 10 May 2025, he formally withdrew his bid for the Presidency of the Republic.
