= Bernardo Fontaine =

Chilean economist (born 1964)

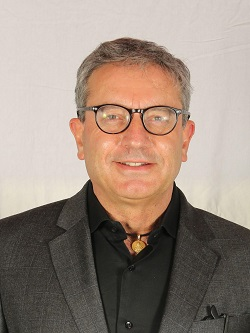

Member of the Constitutional Convention
- In office 4 July 2021 – 4 July 2022
- Constituency: 11th District

Personal details
- Born: 10 June 1964 (age 62) Santiago, Chile
- Parent: Arturo Fontaine Aldunate
- Relatives: Arturo (brother); Juan Andrés (brother)
- Education: Pontifical Catholic University of Chile (BA)
- Profession: Economist

Bernardo Fontaine Talavera (born 10 June 1964) is a Chilean commercial engineer, business executive, and independent politician.

He was elected as a member of the Constitutional Convention in 2021, representing the 11th District of the Metropolitan Region of Santiago.

== Early life and family ==
Fontaine was born on 10 June 1964 in Santiago, Chile. He is the son of Arturo Fontaine Aldunate, former director of the newspaper El Mercurio (1978–1982) and Chilean Ambassador to Argentina (1984–1988), and Valentina Talavera Balmaceda.

He is married and has five children.

== Education and professional career ==
Fontaine completed his primary and secondary education at Colegio Sagrados Corazones de Manquehue and Colegio Tabancura, graduating in 1982. He later studied commercial engineering with a specialization in economics at the Pontifical Catholic University of Chile between 1983 and 1987.

He has worked as a director and executive in companies such as Falabella, LAN, La Polar, and Citibank, and has also been an entrepreneur in various business sectors.

== Political career ==
Fontaine is an independent politician. He promoted the civic initiatives Fundación Ciudadanos en Acción and ReformalaReforma.cl. His candidacy for the Constitutional Convention was supported by Desafío Levantemos Chile, ASECH, and the Multigremial association.

In the elections held on 15–16 May 2021, Fontaine ran as a candidate for the Constitutional Convention representing the 11th District of the Metropolitan Region as an independent on a seat supported by National Renewal (Chile), within the Vamos por Chile electoral pact. He obtained 16,728 votes, corresponding to 4.35% of the valid votes cast, and was elected as a member of the Convention.
