= Loreto Silva =

Chilean politician and deputy minister (born 1964)

María Loreto Silva
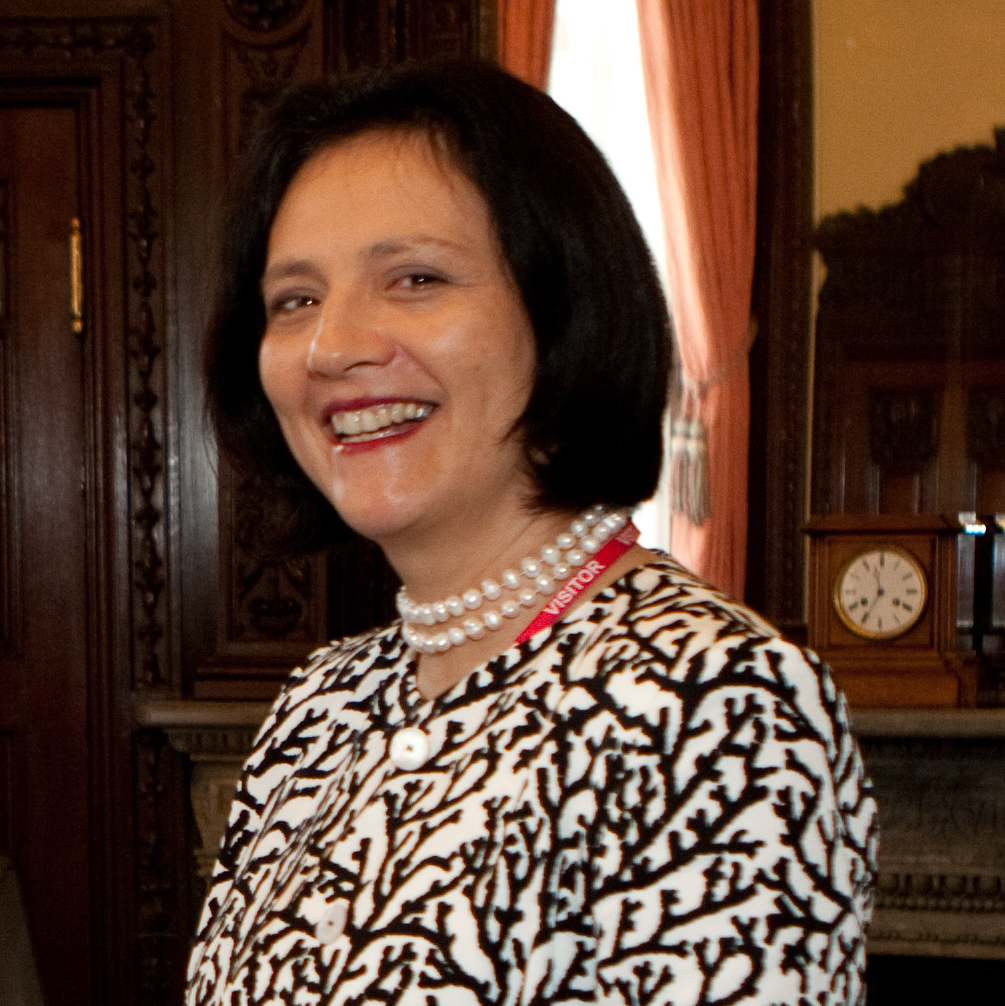
- Under Secretary Silva

Energy Minister of Chile
- In office 5 November 2012 – 11 March 2014
- President: Sebastián Pinera
- Preceded by: Laurence Golborne
- Succeeded by: Alberto Undurraga

Personal details
- Born: 29 June 1964 (age 61) Temuco
- Education: University of Chile (LL.B)
- Occupation: Lawyer

María Loreto Silva Rojas (born 29 June 1964) was a Chilean deputy minister under President Sebastián Piñera.

== Life ==
Silva was born in Temuco and attended the University of Chile. She was a lawyer, academic and consultant with experience in the trade union sector. She was a Deputy Minister of Public Works in the government of President Sebastián Piñera from 2010 to 2012. In 2012 she was promoted to be the minister.

Silva became the President of the directors of the national petroleum company Empresa Nacional del Petróleo (ENAP) in March 2018. In addition she was a director of the law firm Bofill Escobar Silva Abogados and in 2019 she was appointed to the Barrick Gold Corporation.

In June 2020 she was obliged to resign from her position with ENAP. The comptroller had investigated and found that her role with ENAP created a conflict of interest with her role as a director of Bofill Escobar Silva Abogados. Silva sent in her resignation after the findings and after consulting the Chilean President Sebastian Piñera
