= Loreto Carvajal =

Chilean politician

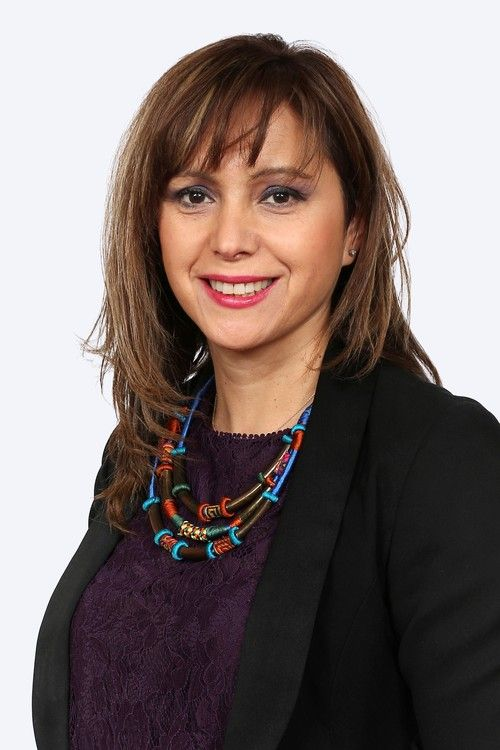

Member of the Senate
- Incumbent
- Assumed office 3 March 2021
- Preceded by: Felipe Harboe
- Constituency: 16th Circunscription

Member of the Chamber of Deputies
- In office 11 March 2018 – 3 March 2021
- Preceded by: Creation of the District
- Succeeded by: Patricia Rubio
- Constituency: District 19
- In office 11 March 2014 – 11 March 2018
- Preceded by: Frank Sauerbaum
- Succeeded by: Dissolution of the District
- Constituency: 42nd District

Councilwoman of Cabrero
- In office 6 December 2000 – 1 January 2009

Personal details
- Born: 15 May 1973 (age 53) Cabrero, Chile
- Party: Party for Democracy
- Children: One
- Parent(s): Domingo Carvajal; Matilde Ambiado
- Education: Catholic University of the Most Holy Conception
- Occupation: Politician
- Profession: Sociologist

María Loreto Carvajal Ambiado (born 18 May 1973) is a Chilean politician who currently serves at the Senate of Chile.

She previously held the same senatorial seat between 2021 and 2022, replacing Felipe Harboe. Between 2014 and 2021, she served two consecutive terms in the Chamber of Deputies of Chile, first representing the 42nd District of the Biobío Region and later the 19th District of the Ñuble Region.

From March 2019 to April 2020, she was First Vice-President of the Chamber, the first deputy from Ñuble to hold that position.

== Biography ==
Carvajal was born in Cabrero on 18 May 1973, the daughter of Domingo Arturo Carvajal Carvajal and Matilde Ambiado Melgarejo.

She completed her secondary education at the Verbo Divino German School in Los Ángeles and later studied law at the Catholic University of the Most Holy Conception, though she did not graduate.

She is the mother of one son and has been in a relationship with former deputy Gabriel Silber since 2019.

== Political career ==
A member of the Party for Democracy, Carvajal began her political career as councillor of Cabrero from 2000 to 2009, being re-elected twice. In the 2013 elections, she was elected to the Chamber of Deputies for the 42nd District of the Biobío Region (2014–2018), and was re-elected in 2017 for the newly created 19th District of the Ñuble Region (2018–2021).

During her tenure, she served on the Standing Committees on Housing, Public Works, and Agriculture, and in 2018 became the first president of the Committee on Women and Gender Equality.

In March 2019 she was elected First Vice-President of the Chamber of Deputies, a position she held until April 2020. In early 2021 she was appointed by the PPD to fill the vacant Senate seat of Felipe Harboe, who resigned to run for the Constitutional Convention. She was later elected senator in the 2021 elections for the 16th Circunscription of Ñuble, assuming office on 11 March 2022.

Carvajal has also supported local development initiatives in her native region, including the independence movement of the town of Monte Águila from Cabrero, citing its distinct community identity and limited municipal representation.
