= Clemente Pérez =

Chilean politician (born 1967)

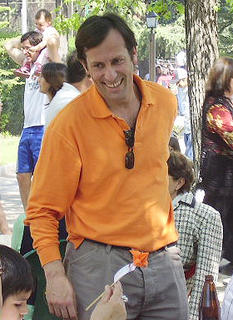

President of the Metro de Santiago
- In office 4 May 2007 – 27 April 2010
- President: Michelle Bachelet
- Preceded by: Blas Tomic
- Succeeded by: Raphael Bergoeing

Undersecretary of Public Works
- In office 2003–2005
- Preceded by: Juan Carlos Latorre
- Succeeded by: Pablo Piñera

President of the Pontifical Catholic University of Chile Students Federation
- In office 1990–1991
- Preceded by: Claudio Orrego
- Succeeded by: Alberto Undurraga

Personal details
- Born: 7 September 1967 (age 59) Santiago, Chile
- Party: Christian Democracy (1990–2018); Amarillos por Chile (2022–2025)
- Education: Pontifical Catholic University of Chile (LL.B)
- Occupation: Politician
- Profession: Lawyer

José Clemente Pérez Errázuriz (born September 7, 1967) is a Chilean attorney, academic, businessman, trade association executive, consultant, and politician.

A former member of the Christian Democratic Party (PDC), he served as undersecretary of Public Works from 2003 to 2005 under President Ricardo Lagos and as chairman of the Santiago Metro from 2007 to 2010 during the first presidency of Michelle Bachelet.

Pérez was an unsuccessful candidate for the Chamber of Deputies in 2005 and for the Constitutional Convention in 2021.

== Early life and education ==
Pérez was born in Santiago, Chile, on September 7, 1967. His father, Clemente Pérez Walker, is a grandson of former foreign minister Horacio Walker and a son of Clemente Pérez Zañartu, who served as President Eduardo Frei Montalva's ambassador to the Holy See in the 1960s.

Pérez attended the Colegio del Verbo Divino in Santiago and graduated from the School of Law of the Pontifical Catholic University of Chile in 1991. While attending the university, he served as president of the Federation of Students of the Pontifical Catholic University of Chile (FEUC). He later studied in the United States, earning a master's degree in public policy from Georgetown University in Washington, D.C. In 2001, he earned a Master of Business Administration (MBA) from the Faculty of Economics and Administrative Sciences of the Pontifical Catholic University of Chile.

Pérez is separated from María Elisa Pérez Vergara, a daughter of former minister Edmundo Pérez Yoma and granddaughter of former minister Edmundo Pérez Zujovic. They have four children: Clemente, Santiago, Federica, and Victoria.

== Professional career ==
From 1995 to 1996, Pérez worked as a consultant in the Urban and Environmental Development Division of the World Bank. He subsequently worked in the Social Programs and Sustainable Development Department of the Inter-American Development Bank (IDB).

From 1999 to 2000, he served as director of the Santiago newspaper La Hora. He later joined the environmental practice of the law firm Guerrero Olivos, where he became a partner. Pérez also taught a course on legal and economic instruments for environmental protection at the Pontifical Catholic University of Chile and the University of the Andes.

In 1999, Pérez founded Sustentable.cl, an environmental management and consulting firm. In January 2011, eight months after leaving the Santiago Metro, he was elected president of the Association of Public Infrastructure Concessionaires (Copsa). He announced his resignation from the association in September 2012.

== Political career ==
Pérez was a member of the Christian Democratic Party (PDC). During the presidency of Eduardo Frei Ruiz-Tagle, he served as director of the Metropolitan Region branch of the National Environment Commission (Conama) from 1996 to 1998. He also worked in the Environmental Division of the Municipality of Santiago, where he worked closely with then-mayor Jaime Ravinet.

In 2003, President Ricardo Lagos appointed Pérez undersecretary of Public Works, a position he held until 2005. In the 2005 parliamentary election, he ran as the Christian Democratic candidate for the Chamber of Deputies in District 23, which comprised the Santiago communes of Las Condes, Vitacura, and Lo Barnechea, but was not elected.

In May 2007, Pérez became chairman of the Santiago Metro, succeeding Blas Tomic, who had resigned amid the Transantiago crisis. In December 2009, during Pérez's tenure, the government of President Michelle Bachelet announced the construction of Line 6 of the Santiago Metro, with an estimated investment of US$900 million.

During the latter part of Bachelet's second presidency, amid divisions between the PDC and other members of the New Majority coalition, Pérez became associated with the Progresismo con Progreso ("Progressivism with Progress") faction. Members of the group opposed supporting Alejandro Guillier, the New Majority candidate in the second round of the 2017 Chilean presidential election, and Pérez argued that the Christian Democrats should cooperate with the incoming government of Sebastián Piñera. Pérez and other members of Progresismo con Progreso resigned from the Christian Democratic Party in January 2018.

In October 2019, Pérez drew public attention for comments he made about student protests involving mass fare evasion on the Santiago Metro. In an interview with the television news program 24 Horas, he described the protests as "rather silly" and said that the movement "hadn't caught on". Two days later, large-scale demonstrations erupted across Chile, marking the beginning of what became known as the Estallido Social ("Social Outburst"), and Pérez's remarks subsequently attracted widespread criticism.

Following the 2019 protests, Chile began a constitutional process that led to the creation of the Constitutional Convention. Pérez subsequently ran as an independent candidate in the 2021 Chilean Constitutional Convention election in District 11, representing the Independientes con Chile ("Independents with Chile") list. He was not elected, receiving 3,025 votes, or 0.79% of the valid votes cast.
