= Carmen Romo Sepúlveda =

Chilean mayor

Carmen Romo
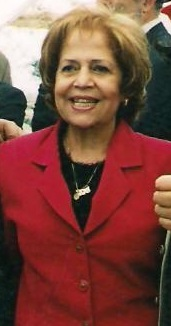

Mayor of Quilicura
- In office 26 September 1992 – 6 December 2008
- Preceded by: Ana María Ried
- Succeeded by: Juan Carrasco

Personal details
- Born: 31 March 1939 (age 86) Santiago, Chile
- Party: Christian Democratic Party
- Children: Three (Among them, Gabriel)
- Occupation: Politician

Carmen Romo Sepúlveda (born 31 March 1939) is a Chilean politician.

She served as the mayor of Quilicura, Región Metropolitana, Chile, a large and bustling suburb of over 126,000 people in the Santiago de Chile metropolitan area since 1992. Romo was the mayor of Quilicura for four consecutive periods.
