= Almagro Park =

Urban park in the city of Santiago, Chile

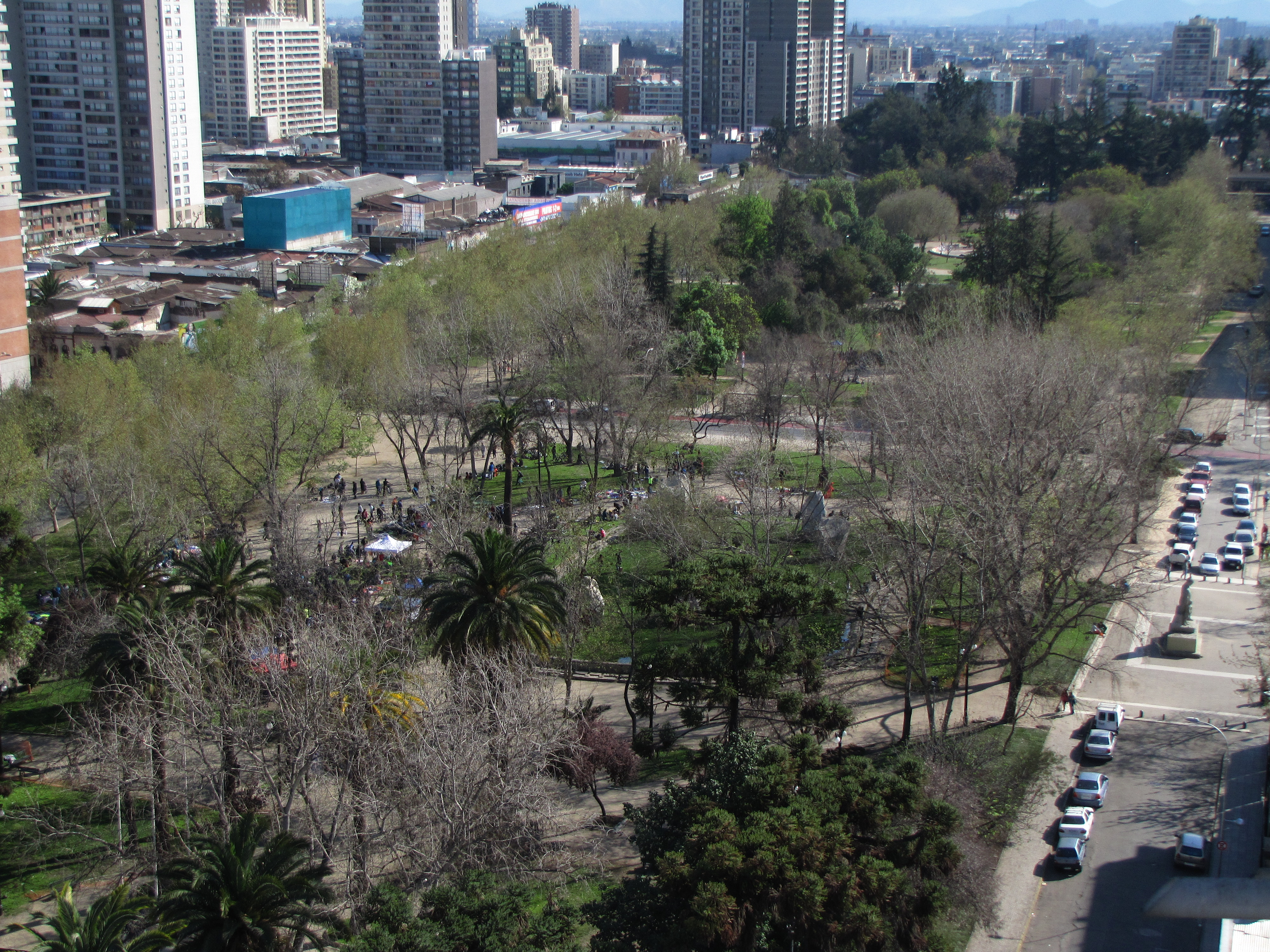
- Aerial view in 2013
- Interactive map of Almagro Park
- Type: Urban park
- Location: Santiago, Chile
- Coordinates: 33°27′07″S 70°39′13″W
- Area: 12 ha (30 acres)
- Operator: Santiago (commune)

Almagro Park is an urban park in the city of Santiago, Chile. The Basílica de los Sacramentinos is situated on the east end of the park, while the Palacio Cousiño is located on its west end. The park marks the north end of the Paseo Bulnes. Parque Almagro metro station is named after the park and the Toesca metro station is located a short walk from the park. The park contains monuments to Pedro Aguirre Cerda, Luis Emilio Recabarren, and Diego de Almagro.

The park was first created as a public square in the mid-17th century, and became a market called Alameda de los Monos, or Cañada del Conventillo in 1828 after it was bought from Manuel Blanco Encalada. It only became a park in 1983, as part of a project to consolidate the Civic District of Santiago. The park covers 12 ha (30 acres) and is built on land originally reserved for a new national congress building of Chile.

== Gallery ==
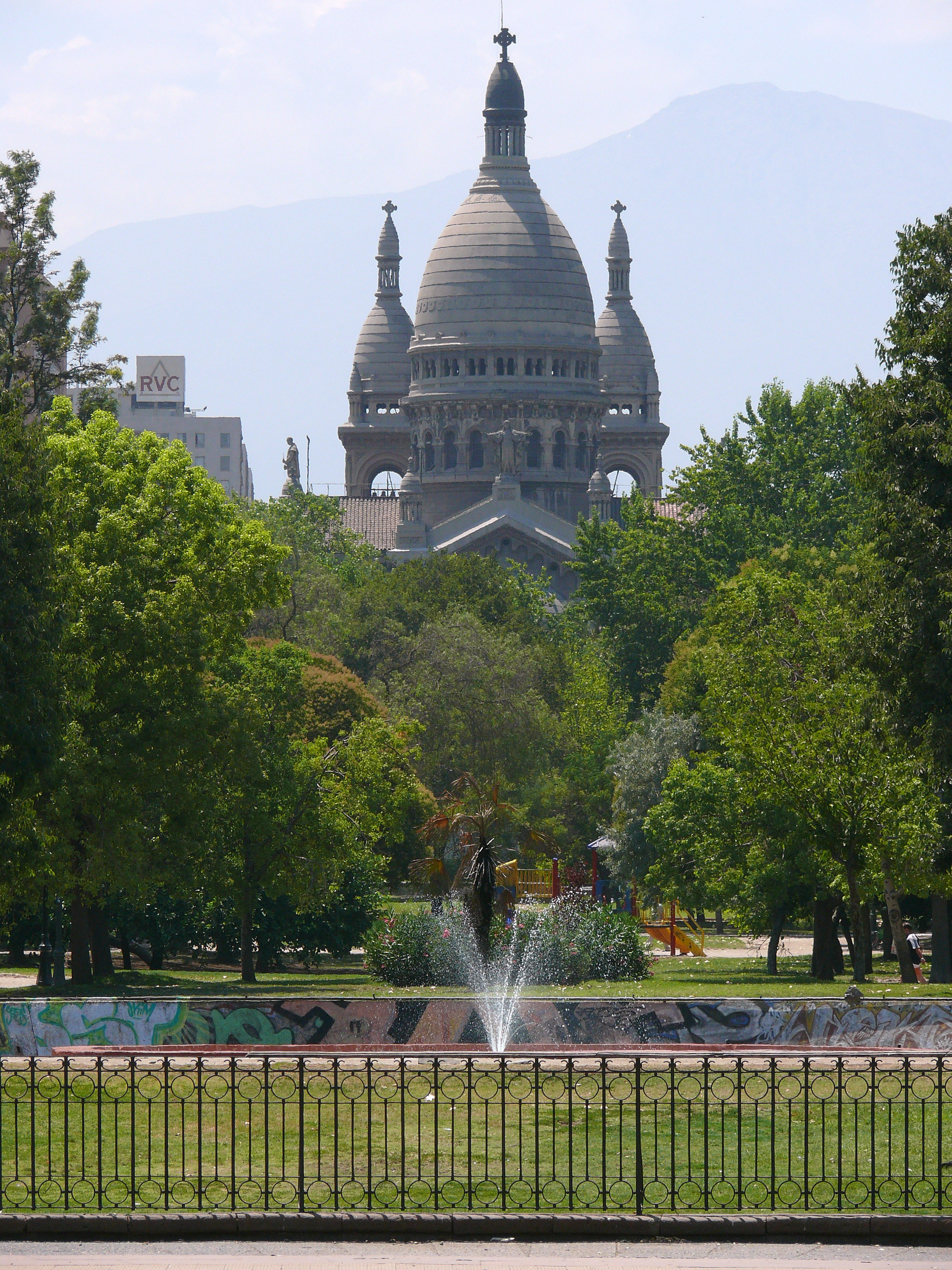
Basílica de los Sacramentinos seen from the park

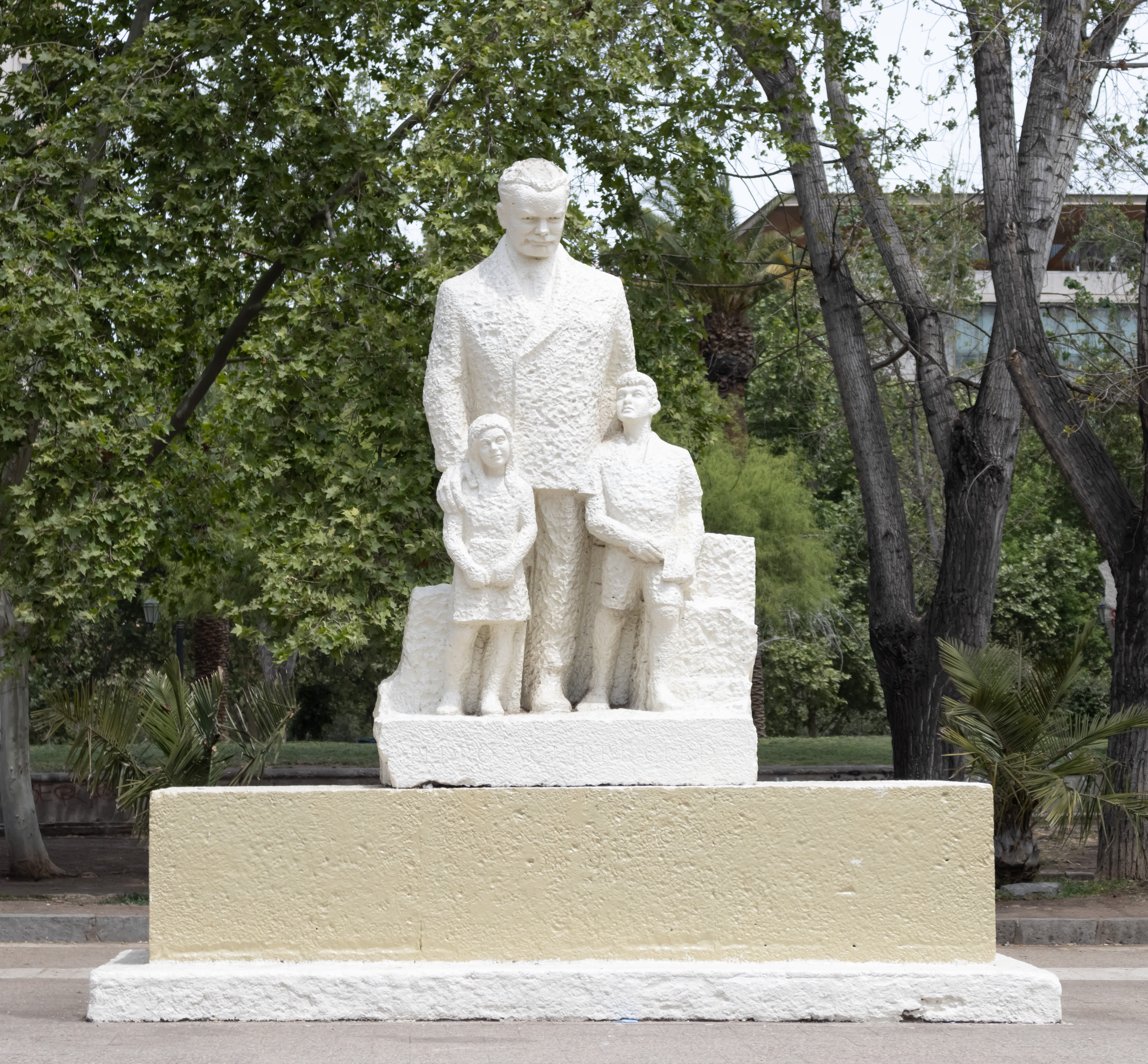
Statue of Pedro Aguirre Cerda

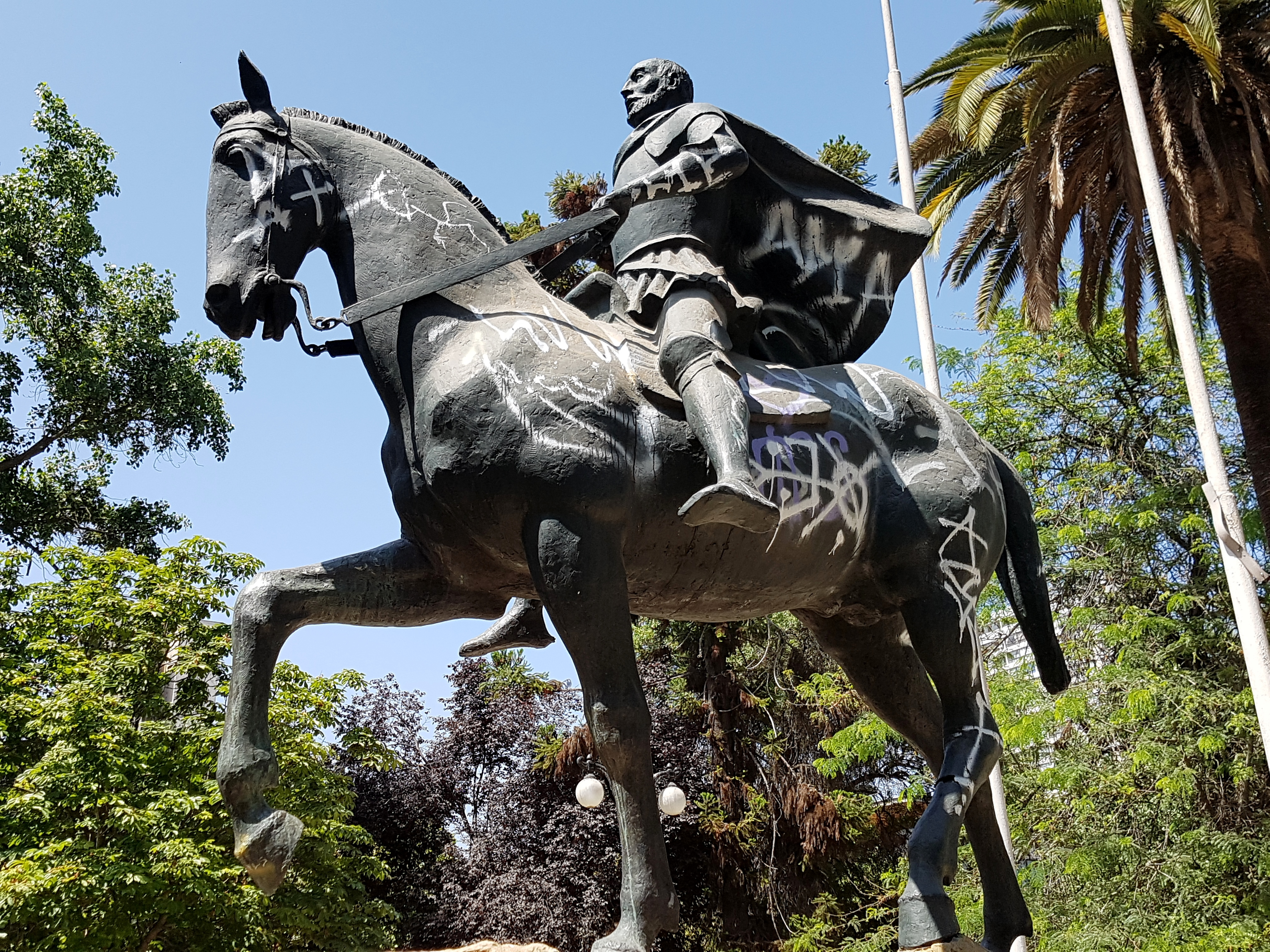
Statue of Diego de Almagro

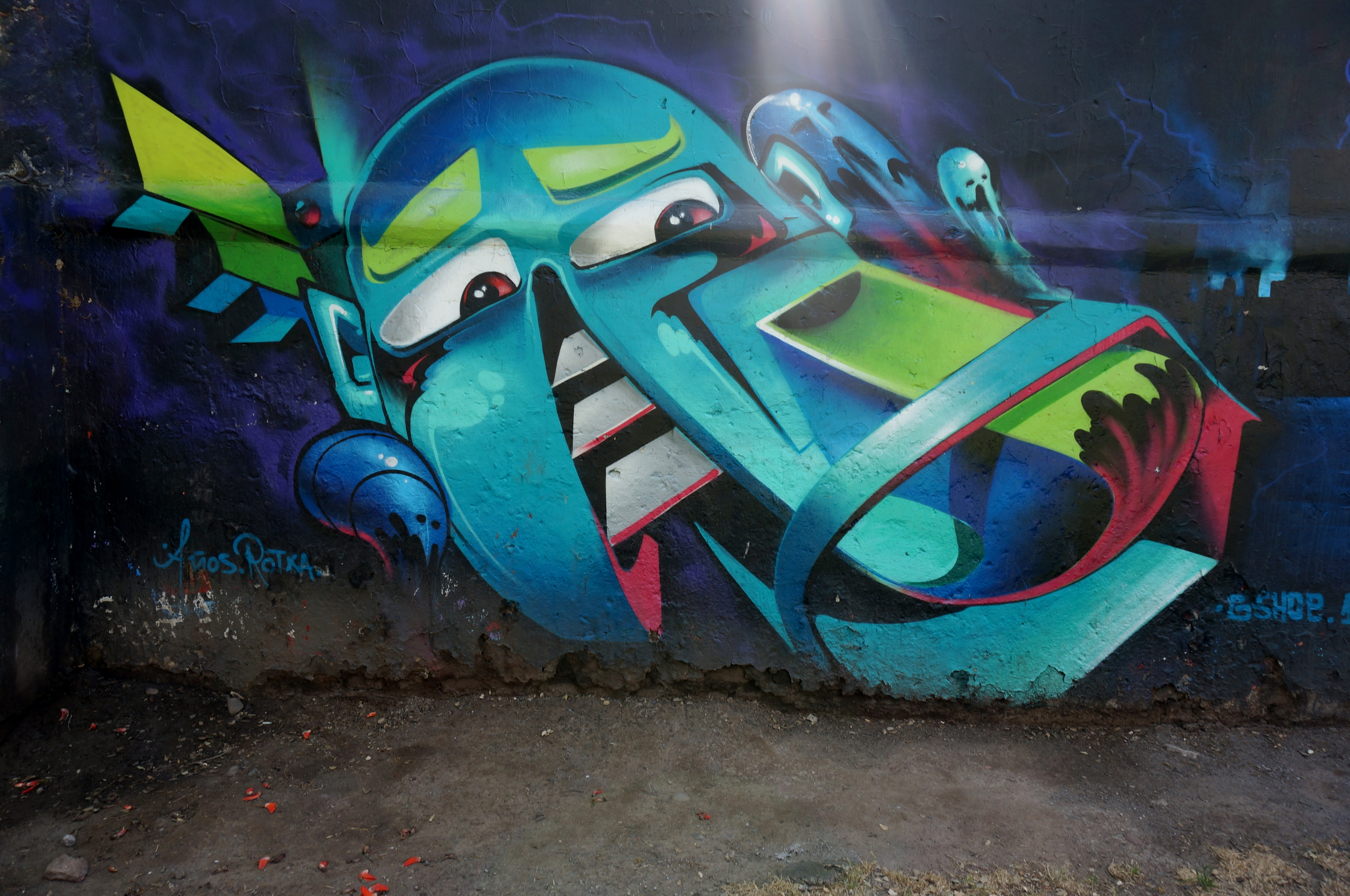
Graffiti inside the park
