= José Ramón Valente =

Chilean economist and politician

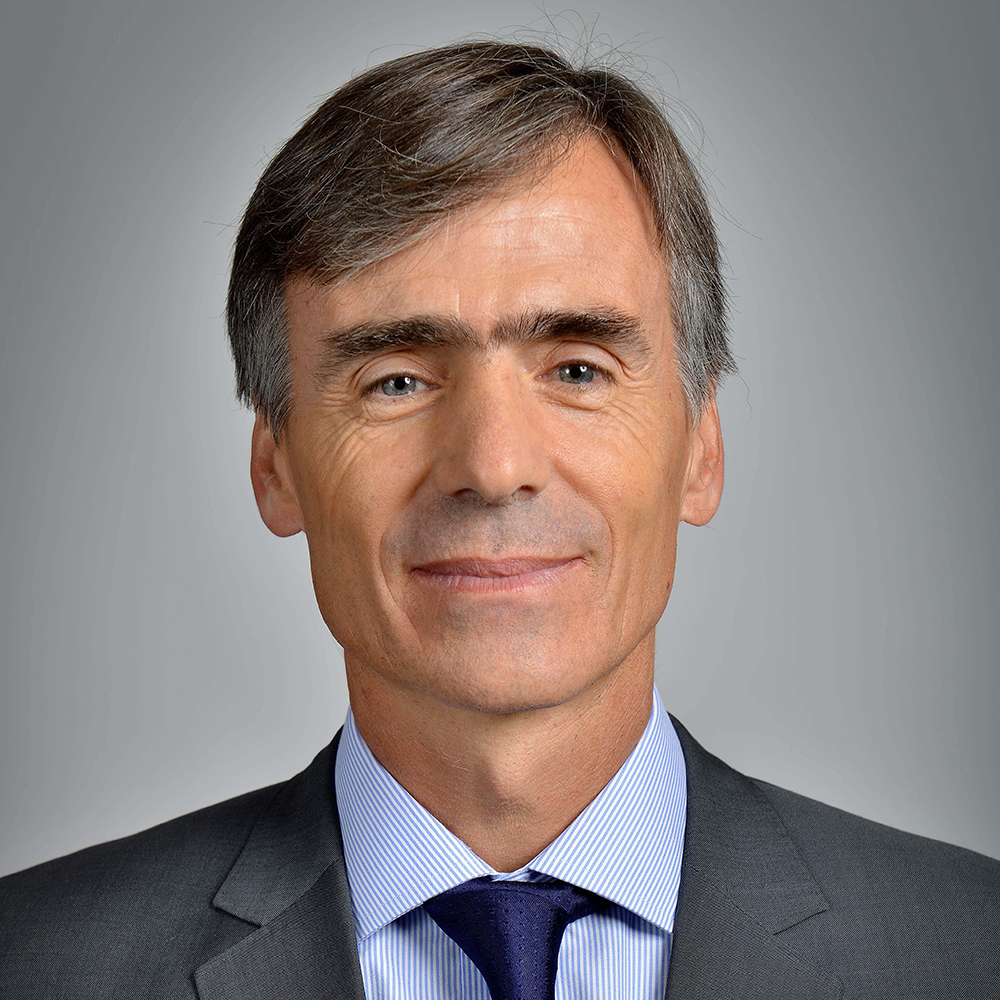
- Official portrait (2018)

Minister of Economy, Development and Tourism
- In office 11 March 2018 – 13 June 2019
- President: Sebastián Piñera
- Preceded by: Jorge Rodríguez Grossi
- Succeeded by: Juan Andrés Fontaine

Personal details
- Born: 15 September 1962 (age 64) Santiago, Chile
- Spouse: Verónica Stein
- Children: Six
- Parent(s): Ramón Valente; Elsa Vias
- Education: Universidad de Chile (B.S); University of Chicago (M.S)
- Occupation: Politician
- Profession: Economist

José Ramón Valente Vias (born 15 September 1962) is a Chilean politician and economist.

He completed his studies with an MBA at the University of Chicago (1988), being a student of Eugene Fama, Nobel Memorial Prize in Economic Sciences (2013).

He actively participated in Sebastián Piñera's 2017 presidential elections campaign as part of the economic team, where he later assumed the role of coordinator. After winning elections, Piñera appointed him Minister of Economy, Development and Tourism, a position that Valente assumed on 11 March until 13 June 2019, when he left the cabinet and was replaced by Juan Andrés Fontaine.

== Family and education ==
He is the son of Ramón Valente and Elisa Vias. His father is a Spanish immigrant. He completed most of his schooling at Colegio Verbo Divino and later studied business administration at the University of Chile, graduating in 1986.

He completed his studies with an MBA from the University of Chicago in 1988, where he was a student of Eugene Fama, recipient of the Nobel Memorial Prize in Economic Sciences in 2013.

He is the father of six children.

== Public and political career ==
He began his professional career as an academic at the University of Chile, serving as professor of economics and international finance for undergraduate students at the Faculty of Economics and Business until 1992.

He is a partner and president of Econsult, a financial advisory firm with which he was associated for nearly 30 years, until assuming ministerial office in March 2018.

Throughout his career, he served on the boards of various domestic and international companies, which he left upon joining the government.

He advised the governments of Presidents Eduardo Frei Ruiz-Tagle and Ricardo Lagos on capital market reforms.

== Works ==
- La historia de un sueño (2011)
- La rebelión del sentido común (2015)
- Los 4 largos años de la Nueva Mayoría (2017, coauthor)
