= Mariano Ruiz-Esquide =

Chilean politician (1930–2024)

Mariano Ruíz-Esquide
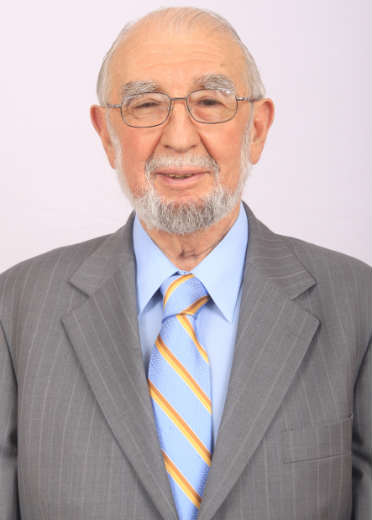

Member of the Senate
- In office 11 March 1990 – 11 March 2014
- Preceded by: District created
- Succeeded by: Felipe Harboe
- Constituency: 19th Circumscription

Member of the Chamber of Deputies
- In office 15 May 1965 – 11 September 1973
- Constituency: 17th Departamental Grouping

Personal details
- Born: 7 April 1936 Talcahuano, Chile
- Died: 20 January 2024 (aged 87) Vina del Mar, Chile
- Party: Christian Democratic Party
- Spouse: Inés Figueroa
- Children: Three
- Education: University of Concepción
- Occupation: Politician
- Profession: Surgeon

Mariano Ruiz-Esquide (10 May 1930 – 20 January 2024) was a Chilean surgeon and politician who served as a Senator. He died on 20 January 2024, at the age of 93.

A long-time member of the Christian Democratic Party (PDC), he served as a Senator for the 13th Senatorial District of the Biobío Region for three consecutive terms between 1990 and 2014.

== Early life and education ==
Ruiz-Esquide was born in Talcahuano on 10 May 1930. He was the son of Mariano Ruiz-Esquide and Carmen Jara, and a cousin of former deputy Rufo Ruiz-Esquide Espinoza. He was married to Inés Figueroa Velázquez and was the father of three children.

He completed his secondary education at the Sagrados Corazones School of Concepción. He later entered the Faculty of Medicine at the University of Concepción, where he obtained his medical degree in 1955 with a thesis titled Dietary Study in the University Population of Santiago. Between 1957 and 1958, he received a scholarship from the Institute of Hispanic Culture to pursue postgraduate studies in Hematology at the Central University of Madrid.

== Professional career ==
Ruiz-Esquide served as an assistant professor in the departments of Medicine and Pharmacology at the University of Concepción. From 1973 onward, he resided in the city of Los Ángeles, where he worked at the local Clinical Hospital between 1974 and 1976. He later joined the Clinical Hospital of Concepción, continuing his medical practice and academic activities.

== Political career ==
Ruiz-Esquide began his political involvement during his university years as a student leader in the Medical Students’ Association and the Student Federation of the University of Concepción.

After graduating, he joined the Christian Democratic Party, which he represented from 1963 as a municipal councilor in Talcahuano. He later served as president of the communal campaign committee for the presidential candidacy of Eduardo Frei Montalva. In 1970, he became national secretary of the party’s National Council.

Following the overthrow of President Salvador Allende on 11 September 1973, Ruiz-Esquide was one of the thirteen Christian Democratic Party members who signed the public statement rejecting the military coup, known as the Declaration of the Group of Thirteen.

In 1977, he was relegated to Antofagasta by the military dictatorship due to public criticism expressed in the magazine Hoy. In 1981, he joined the Regional Council of the Chilean Medical Association, where he was elected president, a position he held until 1989, when he was elected senator. He also served as president of the Regional Federation of Professional Associations and of the Assembly of Civil Society.

In the 1989 parliamentary elections, Ruiz-Esquide was elected senator for the 13th Senatorial District (Biobío Region) for the 1990–1998 term, obtaining 111,432 votes (31.12%). He was re-elected in 1997 for the 1998–2006 term with 109,368 votes (35.78%), and again in 2005 for the 2006–2014 term with 139,657 votes (39.31%). In all three elections, he obtained the highest vote share in his district.

On 31 October 2006, President Michelle Bachelet appointed him as a member of the Advisory Council for the Quality of Education. In March 2015, he was appointed as the President’s representative to the Board of Directors of the University of Playa Ancha, a position he resigned from on 18 June 2018.

== Death ==
Ruiz-Esquide died on 20 January 2024 in Viña del Mar, Chile.
