= Gabriel Silber =

Chilean politician

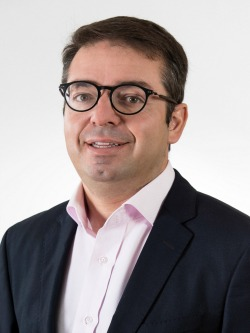

Member of the Chamber of Deputies of Chile
- In office 11 March 2018 – 11 March 2022
- Preceded by: Creation of the District
- Succeeded by: Alberto Undurraga
- Constituency: District 8
- In office 11 March 2010 – 11 March 2018
- Preceded by: Zarko Luksic
- Succeeded by: Dissolution of the District
- Constituency: 16th District

Personal details
- Born: 15 September 1976 (age 50) Santiago, Chile
- Party: Christian Democratic Party
- Spouse: Loreto Carvajal
- Parent(s): Jaime Silber; Carmen Romo
- Education: University of Chile; Diego Portales University (MA)
- Occupation: Politician

Gabriel Moisés Silber Romo (born 15 September 1976) is a Chilean politician.
