= Basílica de los Sacramentinos =

Church in Chile

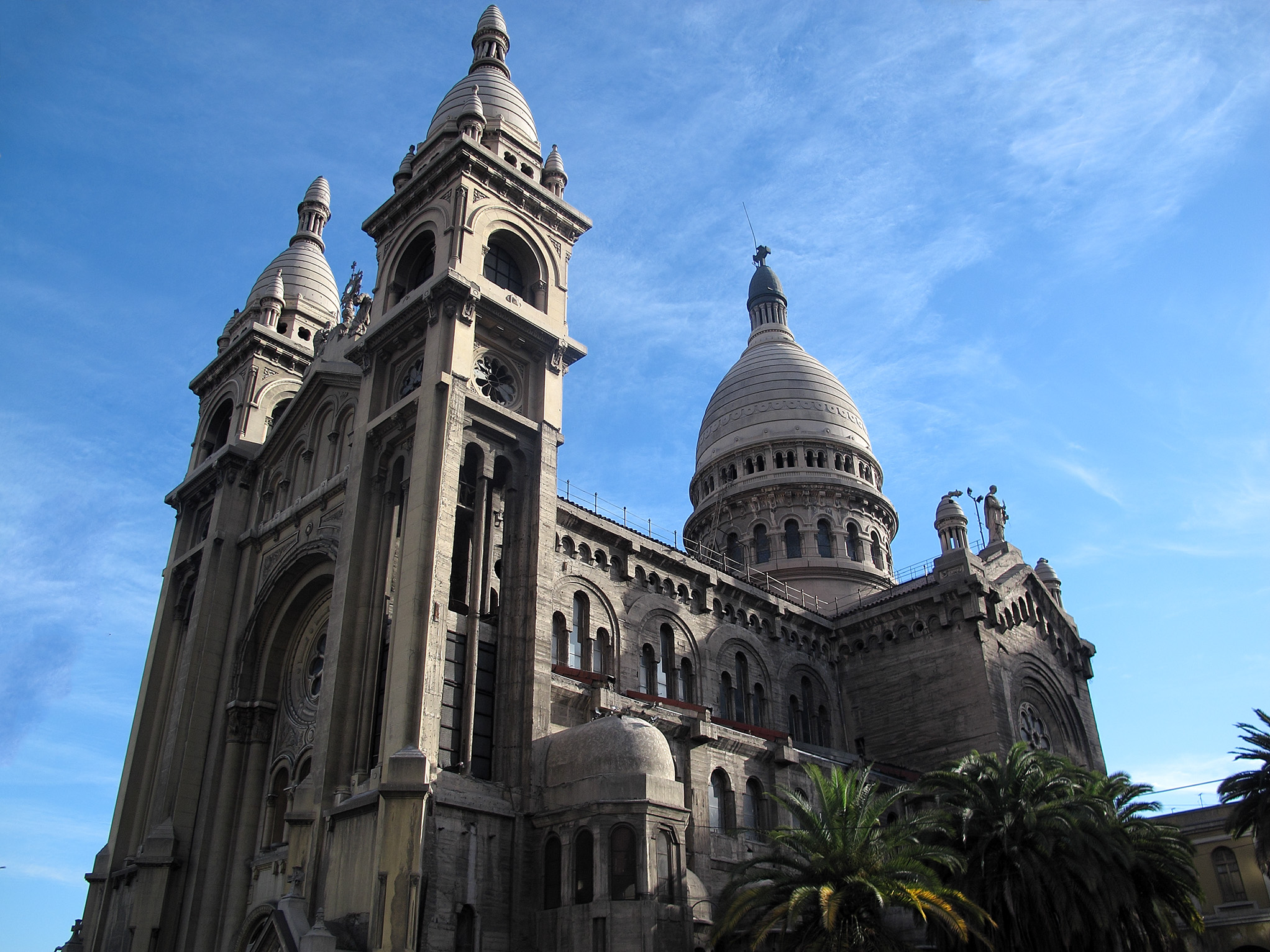

- Location within Chile

Religion
- Affiliation: Catholic
- Sect: Roman Catholic

Location
- Location: Roman Catholic Archdiocese of Santiago de Chile
- Country: Chile
- Interactive map of Basílica de los Sacramentinos
- Coordinates: 33°27′04.75″S 70°38′56.59″W

The Basílica de los Sacramentinos is a church in the Roman Catholic Archdiocese of Santiago de Chile. It administered by the Congregation of the Blessed Sacrament and its design was inspired by the Basilique du Sacré-Cœur in Paris. The main cupola of the church has a structural height of 69 m (226 ft).

Its construction began in 1912, and was completed in 1919. It is built in the neoromantic style, with Byzantine elements.

The church was one of the locations in the movie "Una Mujer Fantastica".
