= Universidad Central de Chile =

University in Chile

Coordinates: 33°27′11″S 70°39′37″W

Central University of Chile
- Universidad Central de Chile
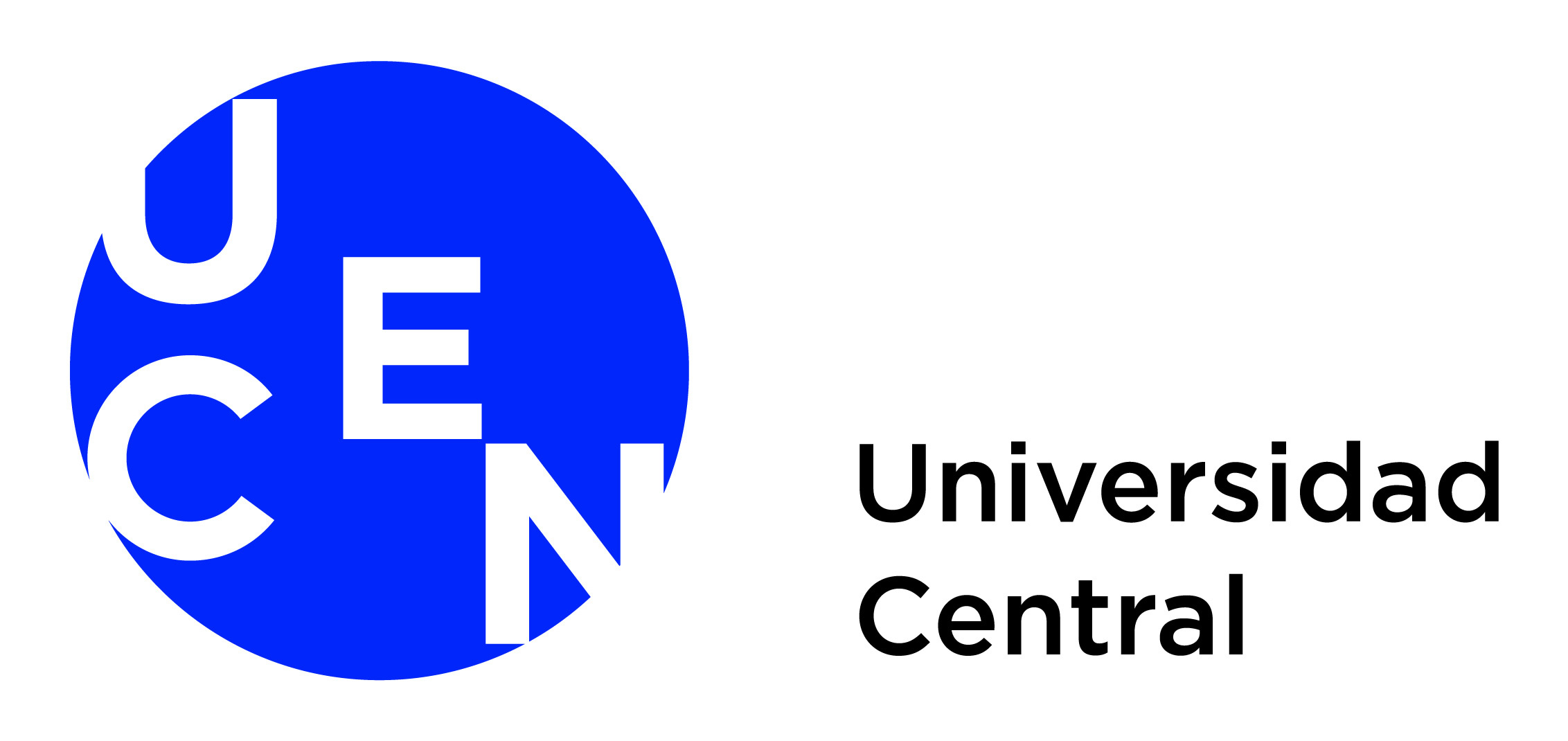
- Type: Private (non-profit)
- Established: 9 November 1982
- President: Patricio Silva Rojas
- Rector: Santiago González Larraín
- Academic staff: 1,200
- Students: 13,186 (2020)
- Undergraduates: 11,748
- Postgraduates: 1,438
- Location: (Chile) Santiago, Santiago Metropolitan Region, Chile
- Website: www.ucentral.cl

Universidad Central de Chile (English: Central University of Chile), abbreviated as UCEN, is the first autonomous private university in Chile, founded in 1982 in Santiago de Chile. It's accredited in the areas of institutional management and undergraduate teaching by the National Accreditation Commission of Chile for a term of four years from December 2017 to December 2021.

The Universidad Central de Chile is structured in five faculties in which are held 33 undergraduate programs and an institute that imparts 6 top-level technical careers. Also Central University has PhD., masters and various training programs and continuing education in the areas of Management, Business, Government, Architecture, Social Sciences, Law, Education, Health and Technology.

The Headquarters of Universidad Central de Chile is located in the University District of Santiago, near the Toesca metro station, addition to four campuses, an extension center and a sports center in the heart of the capital, totaling more than 89,000 m^{2} infraestructura. Also has one campus in the city of La Serena, Región de Coquimbo in the north of Chile.

== Rectors ==
Name	Period
Carlos Blin Arriagada	1983–1985
Húgo Gálvez Gajardo	1985–1995
Vicente Kovacevic Poklepovic	1995–2000
Gonzalo Hernández Uribe	2000
René Martínez Lemoine	2000–2001
Luis Lucero Alday	2002–2011
Dr. Ignacio Larraechea Loeser	2011
Dr. Luis Merino Montero	2011-2012
Rafael Rosell Aiquel	2012-2015
Santiago González Larraín	2015-

== Faculties ==
- Faculty of Engineering and Architecture
  - School of Engineering
  - School of Architecture and Landscape
- Faculty of Economy, Government and Communications
  - School of Economics and Business
  - School of Government and Communications
- Faculty of Education and Social Science
  - School of Initial Education
  - School of Secondary Education and Social Sciences
- Faculty of Law and Humanities
  - School of Law and Social Work
- Faculty of Healthcare science
  - School of Health
  - School of Psychology and Occupational Therapy
- Institute of Technical Careers

== Notable alumni ==
- Felipe Harboe. Senator for Senate cirucunscripcion No. 12 (Bio Bio Cordillera).
- Romy Schmidt. Former Minister of National Assets.

== International agreements ==
=== America ===
- Argentina
  - Universidad de Buenos Aires
  - Universidad Nacional de San Juan
- Bolivia
  - Fundación Universidad Privada de Santa Cruz de la Sierra UPSA
  - Universidad Central
- Brazil
  - Centro Universitario LA SALLE UNILASALLE
  - Centro Universitario Salesiano de Sao Paulo (UNISAL)
  - International Faculty of Curitiba
  - Faculdade América Latina
  - Faculdade da Serra Gaúcha FSG
  - Faculdade de Medicina do ABC
  - Centro Universitário Internacional - UNINTER
  - Pontificia Universidad Católica de Campinas
  - Universidade Católica de Goiás
  - Universidade de Brasília
  - Universidade de Santa Cruz do Sul – UNISC
  - Universidade do Vale do Rio dos Sinos (UNISINOS)
- Colombia
  - Corporación Universitaria U de Colombia
  - Pontificia Universidad Javeriana
  - Universidad Antonio Nariño
  - Universidad Central
  - Universidad de Boyacá
  - Universidad de San Buenaventura Seccional Cali
  - Universidad de Sucre
  - Universidad del Atlántico
  - Universidad del Rosario
  - Universidad EAFIT
  - Universidad ICESI
  - Universidad Militar Nueva Granada
  - Universidad Piloto de Colombia
  - Universidad Pontificia Bolivariana
  - Universidad Pontificia Bolivariana Montería
  - Universidad Santo Tomás
  - Universidad Tecnológico de Antioquia
  - Universidad de Investigación y Desarrollo
  - Universidad EAN
  - Universidad de La Salle
- Costa Rica
  - Tecnológico de Costa Rica
  - Universidad Santa Paula
- Cuba
  - Universidad de La Habana
- Ecuador
  - Escuela Superior Politécnica del Litoral
  - Universidad Central
- United States
  - Kansas State University
- Mexico
  - The College of Mexico
  - Instituto Politécnico Nacional
  - Instituto Superior de Arquitectura y Diseño – ISAD
  - Instituto Tecnológico y de Estudios Superiores de Monterrey – ITESM
  - Universidad Autónoma de Nuevo León
  - Universidad Autónoma de Sinaloa
  - Universidad de Oriente – Puebla
  - Universidad LUX
  - Universidad Nacional Autónoma de México – UNAM
  - Universidad Pedagógica Nacional
  - Universidad Tecnológica de Puebla
  - Universidad Tecmilenio
  - Universidad de Sonora
- (Panama) Parama
  - Universidad de Panamá
  - Universidad Especializada de Las Américas
- Peru
  - Universidad Científica del Sur
  - Universidad Continental
  - Universidad de Lima
  - Universidad Nacional del Altiplano
  - Universidad Nacional Mayor de San Marcos
  - Universidad Privada de Tacna
- Uruguay
  - Universidad de La República

=== Asia ===
- China
  - Changzhou University
  - Zhejiang International Studies University
- Korea
  - Universidad Católica de Daegu
  - University of Seoul
  - Hankuk University of Foreign Studies – HUFS
  - Kyung Hee University, Graduate School of Pan-Pacific International Studies and College of International Studies

=== Europe ===
- (Croatia) Croacia
  - University of Zágreb
- France
  - École Nationale Supérieure d'Architecture et de Paysage de Bordeaux
  - Institut Supérieur de Gestion – ISG
  - Université Catholique de Lyon
- Germany
  - Technische Hochschule Mittelhessen University of Applied Sciences
- Italy
  - Università degli studi di Pavia
  - Politecnico di Milano
  - Università degli Studi di Roma "Tor Vergata"
- Netherlands
  - Universiteit Leiden
- (Romani people) Romani
  - Scola Nationala de Studii Politice si Administrative – SNSPA
- Spain
  - Centro de Estudios Superiores la Salle
  - Real Centro Universitario Escorial María Cristina
  - Universidad Autónoma de Madrid
  - Universidad de Alcalá
  - Universidad de Castilla – La Mancha
  - Universidad de Granada
  - Universitat Juame I
  - Universidad de La Rioja
  - Universidad de Las Palmas de Gran Canaria
  - Universidad de Málaga
  - Universidad de Oviedo
  - Universidad de Sevilla
  - Universidad Politécnica de Madrid
  - Universitas Miguel Hernández
  - Universitat de les Illes Balears
  - Universitat de València
  - Universitat Politècnica de València
  - Universitat Rovira i Virgili
  - Universidad Santiago de Compostela
  - Universidad de Vic – Universidad Central de Cataluña (Campus Manresa)
- Sweden
  - Uppsala University

== Student Federation ==
The Universidad Central de Chile Students Federation (Federación de Estudiantes de la Universidad Central de Chile [abbr. FEUCEN]) is an organization that represents all the students of the University with the academic authorities and the CONFECH (Confederation of Chilean Students). The current president of the FEUCEN is Marco Velarde a student from the School of Sociology.
