= Paseo Bulnes =

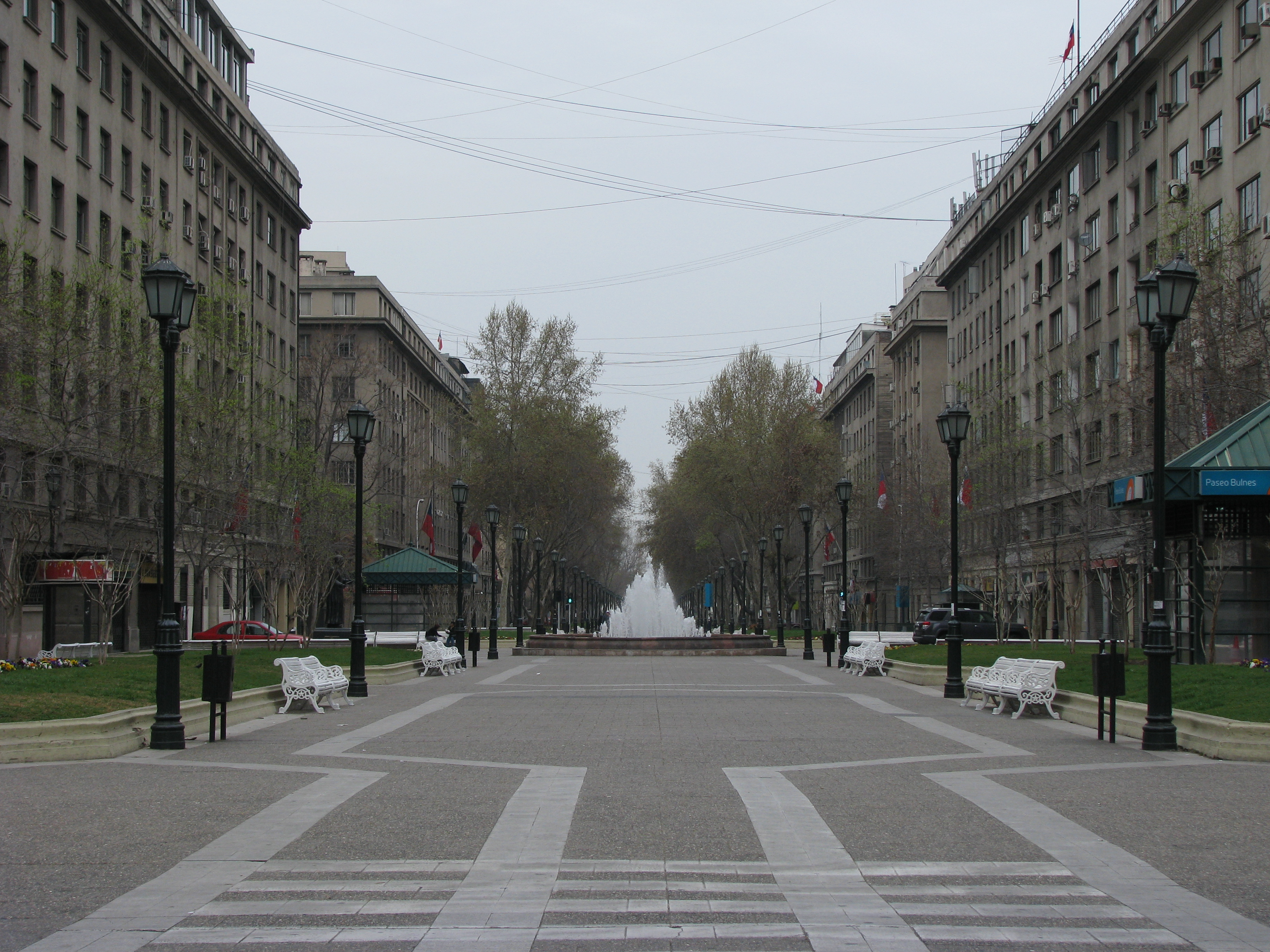
Paseo Bulnes

Paseo Bulnes is a pedestrian street in downtown Santiago. It runs from Alameda Avenue in the north to the Almagro Park in the south. The street is lined by buildings of uniform height and similar facades, which were built under an urban plan approved in 1937 and whose main purpose was the development of a government district around the La Moneda Palace. In 1939, the first zoning regulation plan for Santiago proposed the southward extension of the then Avenida Central (now known as Paseo Bulnes) with a large plaza south of La Moneda, known as Plaza Bulnes. The various buildings were built in an intensive campaign between 1940 and 1950.

The 1937 plan, which was strongly influenced by the ideas of Karl Brunner, also proposed the creation of a terminating vista at the south end of this street, which never was materialized.
