= Felipe Harboe =

Chilean politician (born 1972)

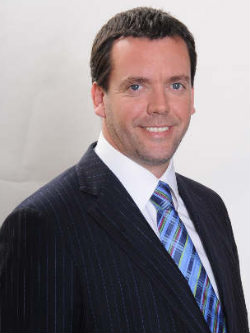

Member of the Constitutional Convention
- In office 4 July 2021 – 4 July 2022
- Constituency: 19th District

Member of the Senate
- In office 11 March 2014 – 3 March 2021
- Preceded by: Mariano Ruiz-Esquide
- Succeeded by: Loreto Carvajal
- Constituency: Bío Bío

Member of the Chamber of Deputies
- In office 19 March 2009 – 11 March 2014
- Preceded by: Carolina Tohá
- Succeeded by: Giorgio Jackson

Deputy minister of Interior
- In office January 2008 – December 2008
- President: Michelle Bachelet
- Preceded by: Jorge Correa Sutil
- Succeeded by: Patricio Rosende Lynch

Personal details
- Born: 20 July 1972 (age 54) Eindhoven, The Netherlands
- Party: Party for Democracy
- Spouse: Katia Trusich Ortiz
- Children: 2
- Education: Central University of Chile (LL.B)
- Profession: Lawyer

Felipe Harboe Bascuñán (born 20 July 1972) is a Dutch-born Chilean lawyer, academic, and former politician. He has held various public offices, including Undersecretary of the Interior (2006–2008), member of the Chamber of Deputies (2009–2014), senator for the Biobío Region (2014–2021), and member of the Constitutional Convention (2021–2022).

A long-time member of the Party for Democracy (PPD) until 2021, Harboe has contributed to legislation and debates on public security, personal data protection, and institutional reforms during the 2000s and 2010s.

His political and legislative career has been characterized by a technocratic and policy-oriented approach. During his time in executive roles, particularly as Undersecretary of the Interior, he led the development of Chile's first national public security strategy and coordinated responses to high-impact crimes in urban areas. Later, in Congress, he played a central role in drafting laws related to cybersecurity, consumer protection, and government transparency, including the lobbying regulation law. As senator, he promoted a constitutional reform to recognize the right to data protection, positioning Chile among the first Latin American countries to address digital rights at that level.

After leaving the Senate in 2021, Harboe was elected to the Constitutional Convention, where he advocated for institutional guarantees of due process, legal certainty, and individual freedoms. In the final stage of his political career, he distanced himself from party structures and founded Proyecta Chile, a platform aimed at articulating centrist and liberal-republican ideas in the context of constitutional reform. Though no longer holding elected office, his legacy remains tied to themes of modernization of the state, legislative precision, and the intersection between technology and law.

== Biography ==
Harboe was born in the Netherlands while his father served as a diplomat. He returned to Chile in early childhood and completed his secondary education at Colegio San Agustín and Colegio Notre Dame. He studied law at Universidad Central de Chile, graduating with a thesis on the social legislation of early 20th-century Chile.

In the mid-1990s, Harboe pursued specializations in constitutional law, international humanitarian law, and public security, including training in Europe on crowd control and stadium violence.

He later taught constitutional law at the University of Chile and Universidad Adolfo Ibáñez and worked with think tanks such as Fundación Chile 21 and Corporación ProyectAmérica.

== Political career ==
=== Early career ===
Felipe Harboe began his public service career in the late 1990s as chief of staff in the Ministry of Economy and later in the Intendencia Metropolitana, where he coordinated public security matters. From 2002 to 2006, he served as Undersecretary of Carabineros, and from 2006 to 2008 he held the position of Undersecretary of the Interior under President Michelle Bachelet.

During his tenure, he developed Chile’s first National Public Security Strategy, emphasizing coordination among police forces, intelligence units, and municipal governments. His time in office was associated with a notable decline in property crime and high-profile robberies in Santiago. In January 2008, following the resignation of Belisario Velasco, Harboe briefly assumed the role of Acting Minister of the Interior at the age of 35, becoming one of the youngest to hold that position. He resigned from the executive in late 2008 to pursue a parliamentary seat.

=== Congressman and conventional ===
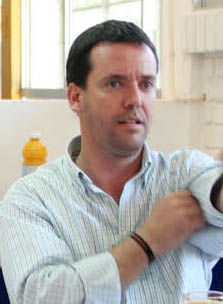
Harboe in 2009.

In 2009, Harboe was appointed to the Chamber of Deputies to replace Carolina Tohá and was subsequently elected for District 22. During his time in the lower house, he participated in various standing committees, including Citizen Security, Constitutional Affairs, Energy, and Drugs. He played a key role in drafting Chile’s Lobbying Transparency Law, which established regulations for interactions between public officials and private interest groups.

Elected senator for the Biobío Region in 2013, Harboe chaired the Senate’s Constitutional Committee and sat on the Agriculture and Public Security commissions. He spearheaded a constitutional reform that recognized data protection as a fundamental right, placing Chile at the forefront of digital rights legislation in Latin America. His legislative work also included initiatives in cybersecurity, financial transparency, and consumer rights within the insurance sector—efforts often referred to as the “Harboe reforms”. In 2019, he joined the Legal Committee of the British-Chilean Chamber of Commerce to contribute to debates on digital trust and corporate governance.

In early 2021, Harboe resigned from the Senate to participate in the Constitutional Convention. He was elected with more than 7% of the vote in District 19 (Ñuble) and served in the Human Rights and Fundamental Rights Commission, where he advocated for the protection of due process and data privacy. Later that year, he left the Party for Democracy after more than three decades of affiliation and founded Proyecta Chile, a centrist and liberal-republican initiative aiming to influence the constitutional drafting process from outside traditional party structures.

Despite his initial support for constitutional change, Harboe eventually voiced strong concerns over the draft produced by the Convention, particularly regarding its legal coherence and institutional design. He publicly voted against the proposed text in the 2022 plebiscite, aligning with the «Reject» option that prevailed.
