= Arturo Fontaine Talavera =

Chilean novelist, poet, and essayist

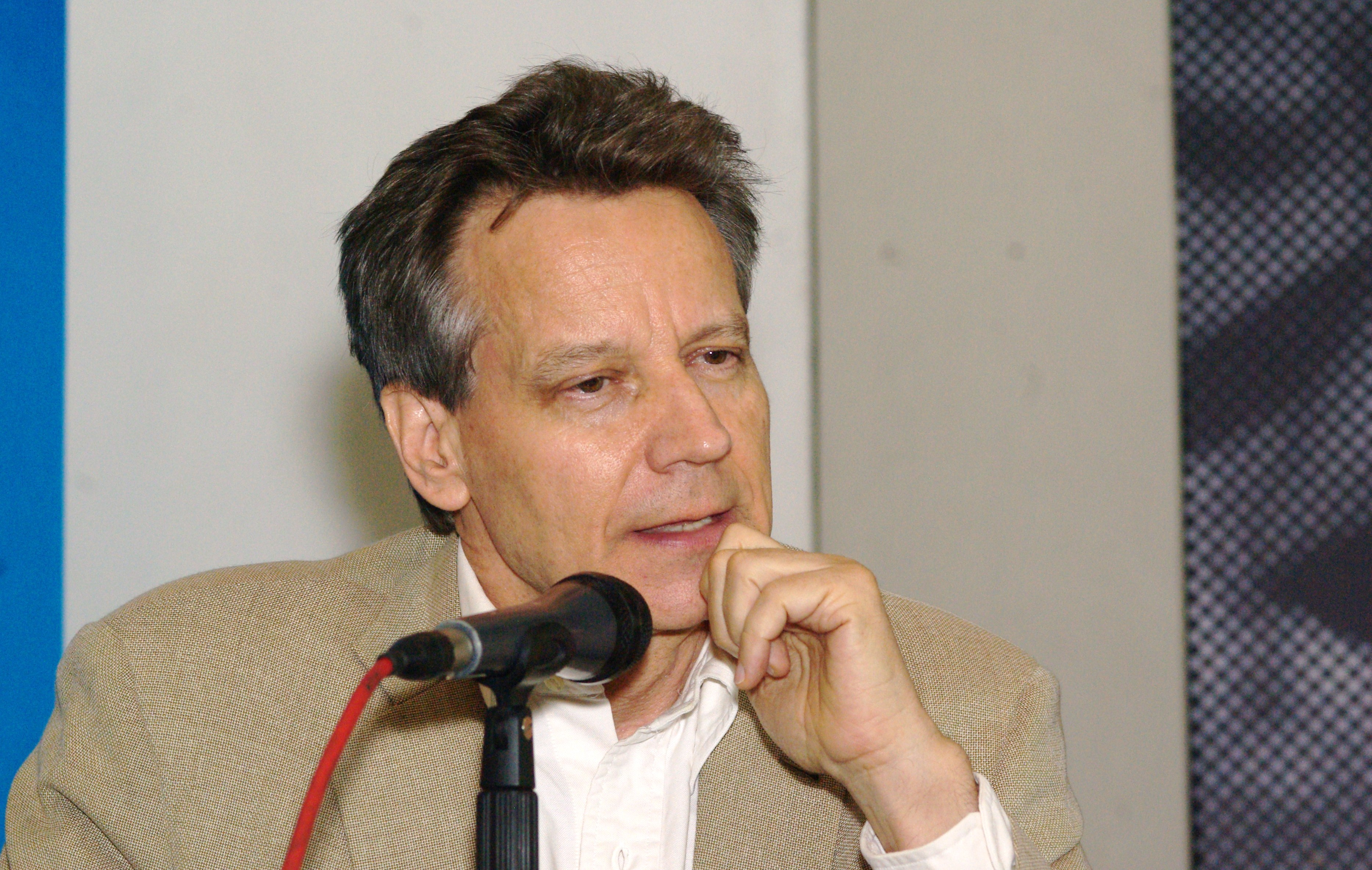
- Born: May 9, 1952 (age 74); Santiago, Chile
- Citizenship: Spain

Arturo Fontaine Talavera (Santiago, 1952) is a novelist, poet and essayist, considered as one of the most representative writers of the Chilean literary movement "New Narrative", which emerged in the 1990s.

Fontaine studied philosophy and taught at the University of Chile before pursuing graduate studies and teaching at Columbia University. After earning an MA and an MPhil, Fontaine returned to Chile and joined the independent liberal think tank Centre for Public Studies as a translator, heading up the quarterly magazine Estudios Públicos. In 1983, he was named its Director. He also taught philosophy at the University of Chile. Under his leadership, the CEP became a meeting place for intellectuals and an intellectual centre of great academic prestige and influence, while the magazine became an outlet for different points of view. In 2013, after 31 years at CEP, Fontaine was forced to resign with the board saying it needed to take a new direction. The media interpreted Fontaine firing as a result of polarisation of Chilean society together with his critical analysis of the administration of President Piñera.

As a writer, Fontaine is known for his poetry and fiction. He published his first book of poetry, Nueva York, in 1976. This was followed by Poemas hablados (1989), Tu nombre en vano (1995), and Mis ojos x tus ojos (2007). His poems have also appeared in numerous anthologies. Fontaine's first novel was the highly acclaimed Oír Su Voz (1992), which was followed by Cuando eramos inmortales (1998) and the award-winning, La vida doble in 2010.

== Biography ==
=== Early life ===
Son of the poet Valentina Talavera Balmaceda (1928–2011) and the lawyer and journalist Arturo Fontaine Aldunate, ex-Chilean ambassador to Argentina, director of the El Mercurio newspaper and winner of the Premio Nacional for Journalism, Fontaine is the eldest of six children. He is married and separated from Mercedes Ducci, with whom he has two children.

Fontaine spent his childhood and adolescence between Santiago and Quechereguas, a small community near the River Maule, where the family had an old estate. He went to the Sagrados Corazones de Maquehue College.

=== University ===
Later he continued his studies in the department of Humanities at the University of Chile while simultaneously studying law at the Catholic University (Católica) (although he left his law studies before completion).

Fontaine graduated with maximum honours at the beginning of 1977. He was awarded a degree in philosophy and immediately afterwards was appointed as a teacher at his alma mater.

In September of the same year Fontaine travelled to the United States to continue his post graduate studies in the Philosophy department at Columbia University, New York, where he won the President's Fellowship scholarship and studied under Arthur Danto, among others. He attended several workshops in the writing division of Columbia University and was a student of Manuel Puig – the Argentinian novelist – Derek Walcott, Seamus Heaney, Joseph Brodsky, Daniel Halpern, Frank MacShane, among others. In 1980 he was named Preceptor and taught the course known at Columbia as "Humanities" where students read a selection of fundamental literature texts.

== Career in Chile ==
=== Centro de Estudios Públicos ===
With two master's degrees, an MA and an MPhil from the philosophy department of Columbia University, Fontaine returned to Chile to teach at a newly founded university. However, shortly after his return, the university folded due to the changing funding environment in the government of Augusto Pinochet. Fontaine therefore found himself without a job and entered the Centro de Estudios Públicos (Centre for Public Studies) as a translator. Here he soon found himself heading the magazine Estudios Públicos, a quarterly publication dedicated to the Social Sciences and the Humanities. In 1983 he was named Director of the CEP, an independent and liberal institute.

At the same time he worked as a teacher of philosophy at the University of Chile, where he taught – and still teaches – a seminar on aesthetics and as a teacher of political philosophy at the Institute of Political Science in the Catholic University (1990–2007).

Under his leadership the Centre for Public Studies (CEP) was transformed into a meeting place for intellectuals and the political class from all sectors. Many members of the opposition found a place there where they could put forward their points of view via articles in Estudios Publicos and in numerous and popular seminars which were organized to discuss public affairs. The financing of the CEP came from foundations such as the Ford Foundation, the Tinker Foundation, the National Endowment for Democracy and donations from private businesses.

Fontaine found in the CEP a method of channeling public anxieties and a way to influence the return of democracy. He published various articles, among them "¿Quién defiende la censura previa del libro?" in which he challenged the Chilean censorship policies: "it is doubly serious to know that our culture is being censored and that, on top of that, no one sees the necessity to explain why." Together with other Centres for Studies such as CIEPLAN, CED, FLACSO and SUR, the CEP played a role in ending the dictatorship and the transition period contributing in the construction of an intellectual and politically calm climate, pragmatic, academically rigorous, and favourable to a peaceful and definitive establishment of democracy.

In June 1988, the CEP published a poll (cited by The New York Times) showing a general repudiation of the Pinochet regime and predicting its defeat in upcoming elections, contradicting three other published polls that predicted the triumph of Pinochet.

During the rule of the Concertación, the CEP became an intellectual centre of great academic prestige and influence. Of particular importance were its studies and proposals on subjects such as education, the environment, the reform of public administration, financing in politics, social and urban policies for Santiago, indigenous peoples and regulating telecommunications. The polls that they regularly carry out are the best sounding boards and the most credible of any in Chile. The CEP also acts as a lively cultural centre which includes conferences and cinema. In the words of Mario Vargas Llosa:

"Arturo Fontaine made of the CEP... an institution of high culture in which liberal theories inspired analysis, propositions (and) at the same time there were debates and meetings of intellectuals... of the most different persuasions... He created the most objective and reliable polls in Chile according to politicians of the whole political spectrum"

On May 10, 2013, after 31 years working in the institution, Fontaine was forced to resign by the Executive Committee of the Board of Trustees of CEP. Fontaine declared:

"This was something unexpected for me". It was explained to him "that CEP needed to start a new phase with a new director". "When I returned to Chile after my studies abroad I wanted to contribute, as an intellectual, to the transition of my country from dictatorship to democracy. At CEP I found a place from where this was possible for me. I believe that CEP under my direction has been a meeting place, an institute were conversations have taken place, an institute devoted to analysis and discussions. CEP has been an independent academic institute, where people not only talk about freedom, but they experience freedom. CEP has not been in service of the right nor the center nor the left. Political Parties and their institutes perform that function. CEP has not been in service of the entrepreneurs either. Entrepreneurial associations perform that function. CEP has been in the service of Chile through its studies and seminars. The most visible example are CEP's polls but there are others".

The media has interpreted Fontaine downfall as a sign of the present polarization in Chilean society. El Mostrador, La Segunda, La Tercera, The Clinic and CNN have suggested that Fontaine critical analysis of President Piñera's administration, his positive evaluation of Michelle Bachelet strategy to win the presidential election in 2013 and, specially, his affinity with the students' protests triggered CEP's Board of Trustees decision.

In fact, his responsibility as a member of the board of the Museum of Memory and Human Rights, his novel La vida doble, based on the real story of a leftwing woman trained for the urban guerrilla warfare who was tortured and became a ferocious agent of the dictatorship, the seminars organized by CEP in which several experts questioned the credibility of the figures given by the government about poverty ( Casen poll) and then reached the news even outside Chile (The New York Times, The Economist, the Financial Times covered this story known as "Casengate"), and, in particular, Fontaine's poignant essays against for-profit universities which have influenced the students and are quoted often by the leaders of the students' movement explain CEP's board decision to fire Fontaine. CEP's board, composed mainly by now ready to use the academic prestige of the institution to defend without nuances the existing economic model in Chile. According to Vargas Llosa:

CEP's sponsors discovered that Arturo Fontaine is too independent for their taste. The independence of a writer and liberal intellectual would not be useful, in their view, under the present circunstances in Chile. It's "the hour of the trenches,"

.

=== Museum of Memory and Human Rights ===
As a director of the Museum of Memory and Human Rights, Fontaine has defended it against criticism from the Right (including politicians from UDI, different journalists and El Mercurio) which considers it to be both divisive and biased. The museum, which remembers those victims who suffered the violations of their human rights under the dictatorship of Augusto Pinochet "doesn’t pretend to give a neutral or bland account. The facts are presented from the perspective of human rights and the democracy that protects them. The great lesson to be learned is what it means to lose that democracy… the causes don’t excuse the later horrors and cruelty that… systematically violated the life, body and dignity of so many people. The State therefore became the sacrificial priest," wrote Fontaine.

== Literary works ==
From an early age Fontaine stood out for his inclination towards letters and at fourteen he won his first prize, the Alsino, awarded by the organization IBBY, whose jury was presided over by Marcela Paz. His first published book was one of poetry and in its narrative the city and the rural world became entwined. His poems have appeared in various anthologies:

- Nueva Antologia de la Poesia Castallana of Eduardo Anguita (1981)
- Antologia de Breve Poema en Chile of Floridor Perez (1998)
- Antologia de la Poesia Religiosa Chilena of Miguel Arteche and Rodrigo Canovas (2000)
- Poesia Chilena Desclasifcada of Sergio Olguin (2001)

His short stories have also been anthologized: "Honrrarás a tu padre" in 1998 and "Nuevos pecados capitales of Sergio Olguin" in 2001. He has also published essays on different themes in the magazine Estudios Públicos and his literary articles have appeared in Letras Libres, El Mercurio, Nexos, Página/12 and others. His conferences on Marcel Proust and Fernando Pessoa can be seen on video in YouTube.

=== Nueva York ===
The poems collected together in Nueva York (1976) were well received by critics. Filebo wrote: " …his book is a little treatise… on the glitter and misery of this Babylon where, day after day the flower of a new Apocalypse bursts forth." Braulio Arenas affirmed that Fontaine "emerges with great force in Chilean poetry, with a youthful, wholesome and unforeseen energy.… [H]is New York stands out for its personal structure, a structure eternal and momentary, apocalyptic and serene, sinister and translucent.

=== Poemas Hablados ===
Thirteen years after the publication of Nueva York, Fontaine published his second book of poetry: Poemas hablados in 1989. Poemas hablados is a collection where the monologues of different persons take precedence. Roberto Merino wrote: "Fontaine wants to restore the light, the shadow and the lost sense of intimacy, weaving together the most vulnerable elements into his text: memory and speech. The critic Carmen Foxley pointed out that "they are situations or scenarios through which a person passes, leaving there his footprints, eyes, hair slowly falling backwards, a blink and the disturbing and mortal effect of that interruption, which interrupts the apparent stillness and anachronistic recollection of the scene and makes everything apparently innocent seem suspicious." When the book appeared, Ignacio Aguero recorded a video which gives an idea of how these poems should be spoken, using the voices of the actress Schlomit Baytelman and the author, with a commentary by the poet Diego Maquieira.

=== Oír Su Voz ===
In 1992 Fontaine published his first novel Oír su voz which established him as one of the principal figures in the new Chilean writing. The novel was both a great critical and public success, staying for more than 30 weeks on the best sellers list. There were a few exceptions to this, such as a virulent article from Ignacio Valente, an Opus Dei priest, who objected to its "reality" and concluded that the novel was lackluster and inauthentic.

David Gallagher, in The Times Literary Supplement, maintained that Oír su voz was undoubtedly "the star among the new Chilean novels". "For a novelist with the talent of Fontaine, the social structure of Chile, with its mixture of 19th century hypocrisy and modern technology, has great literary potential." Continuing, Gallagher claims that reading Oír su voz will leave the reader "more alert when you’re taken to the Board Room. After a bit of haggling over the money on the table, you can smile when intellectuals discuss whether art is in the mind or to do with money."

Mario Vargas Llosa stated that we are dealing with "an ambitious and profound novel which covers all the secrets of Chilean society,"(blurb written by Vargas Llosa on the cover of the reedition of Oír su voz by Alfaguara 2003) while the Chilean critic Camilo Marks commented that "for the first time, our insignificant, loved, hated, despised, praised and unbalanced Santiago has found its own voice."

The novel takes place in a social context marked by the tensions and fissures of a traditional and dependent society that is subjected to a process of a rapid and enforced globalization and capitalist transformation, a phenomenon in which are mixed together the search for the new and the impulse to conserve identities, the faith in progress and the mimicry with respect to the dominant classes in society, the ambition and the fear, the hope and the resentment. According to the critic Nicolas Salerno, it deals with "the problems and contradictions that are represented in this hybrid of modernity." For Maria Luisa Fischer, Oír su voz demands "a reader who doesn’t let himself get seduced by the reality which the world on the surface and the references seem to offer him or, to put it in another way, that he observes what happens above and below the surface: a reader who reads the novel in the way that Pelayo comments with his intellectual friends, as fiction and not as a chronicle… to sum up, a reader who is suspicious of the enchantments in the allusions and who knows how to observe the contradictions that are being debated on the surface of the world that is being represented."

Fontaine himself says:

"power is always exercised through language. There is no human power anywhere that is not set forth in language. In my novel Oír su voz I bring together a plurality of jargons and languages. Juxtaposing them renders them comparable to each other. In their hand to hand combat they reveal themselves for what they are: voices. There is no single tone… only a criss-crossing of dissimilar voices and of heterogeneous linguistic material."

=== Tu nombre en vano ===
After the success of his novel, Fontaine surprised everyone with something totally different: poems along the lines of a negative mysticism, i.e. poems-prayers to a god that doesn't exist. "No podemos decir la palabra/por eso todas las demas". Tu nombre en vano, published in 1995, is a thoughtful book which explores religiousness from the point of view of its absence and is constructed in the tradition of the psalms and mystic poetry.

=== Cuando éramos inmortales ===
His second novel, Cuando eramos inmortales (1998), is a Bildungsroman, in which the central figure, Emilio, instead of consolidating his personality in the world, starts living through a process of losing his convictions or, to put it another way, begins to lose his traditional spiritual home and has to try and live in the inclemency of modern times. The narrative is in the first and third person, in the present and the past, forms which go on inserting themselves fluidly and often in the same paragraph. This type of mobile camera suggests that there are moments in the story when the life of the child Emilio predominates and others when the reconstruction of the past made by the adult, who is not the child Emilio, does. They are the fractures that stay in the reconstruction of memory and which the shape of the writing shows. "With delicate determination, he manages to construct the act of remembering, capturing the precise instance in which one’s experience fixes itself in the memory", remarks the Argentine critic Sylvia Hopenhayn. "A beautiful novel, full of suggestions, and above all a really successful achievement" said Luis de la Peña in Babelia. At times Cuando eramos inmortales has a lyrical and impressionistic tone but this does not mean that it doesn't have a solid plot. "The most entertaining of all the novels published this year" according to the writer Antonio Skármeta. In the judgment of the novelist Alfredo Bryce Echenique it is " the fulfilled ambition of a great writer". For Jorge Edwards it is "an original novel, which has to be savoured and relished. The quality of writing is such that it’s almost better on a second reading". The philosopher and historian Víctor Farías commented along the same lines: "Fontaine has written one of the few Chilean novels in which the language of Castile has recovered its noble sound". The dramatist Marco Antonio de la Parra has defined "it as a beautiful novel about the pain of childhood". In spite of its intimate tone, the novel raises questions about the brazenness, dreams and contradictions of a traditional society on its way to modernization. In the cruelty and violence of the youngsters at the school, some observers have seen a foretaste and preparation for the political violence that characterized the Pinochet regime. Armando Uribe declared that Cuando éramos inmortales "reveals in a certain way the essence of those who give orders and those who take them. Inasmuch as there are writers capable of representing this (and the case among our novelists is almost unique), it means that they are truly great".

=== Mis ojos x tus ojos ===
Fontaine returned to poetry with Mis ojos x tus ojos in 2007, a collection of brief love poems, several of which had appeared before in the magazine Letras Libres. The critic Grínor Rojo wrote:"How can one write love poetry in these sceptical times?...to look at someone’s eyes is not just to contemplate them but to go inside them…."Tus parpados visten y desvisten a tus ojos" and later on, commenting on another poem that says "insisto llorando y te obligo a abrirme en gajos/a beber tus labios me vas forzando sin querer" Rojo says: "This is the moment when the intensity of erotic ecstasy is substituted by boredom….a lovely book and much more profound than it would appear from a superficial reading". The poet Oscar Hahn commented: "I find it really unusual that the author who wrote those powerful and extensive novels Oir su voz and Cuando eramos inmortales should be the same one who composes these laconic, brief and almost silent verses". The poems speak about a story of love "which the reader has to put together in his imagination because the pieces that complete it are absent and this absence is also called silence. Not any silence but the one that hides itself among the folds of love and the gaps in the words. And this is what Arturo Fontaine expresses with impeccable intuition in Mis ojos x tus ojos". For the poet Diego Maquieira it is about "verses that are absolutely alive and uncontaminated, flashes of high definition, expressions of infinite tenderness…finally a book in which the striking beauty of Eros gives love the possibility of finding a home".

=== La vida doble ===
La vida doble appeared in 2010, published by Tusquets in Spain and Argentina, and published in English by Yale University Press in 2013 in a translation by Megan McDowell. It is a novel based on a true story of a female guerilla captured by the secret police during the Pinochet era: she was savagely tortured and later converted into working as an agent for that intelligence service and for many years fought her ex-comrades. More than a political novel, it plunges the psychological depths of treachery and resentment, commitment and motherhood. The main character tells her story to an unnamed, silent journalist who listens to her and hopes to report on the story. Carlos Fuentes wrote that this book "goes deeply into moral dilemmas and treachery…..nobody represents Chilean writing better today than Arturo Talavera Fontaine…and maybe nobody… better places the movement of the political and social reality of Chile within their own literary reality and the tensions, struggles, uncertainties loyalties and treacheries of a society in flux"". In her review of the book, Fietta Jarque in the Spanish daily paper El País, wrote that:

It is a novel that never flags…Fontaine has fashioned, sentence by sentence, a story that doesn’t just end on the last page.

Ignacio Echevarría points out that it deals, above everything else, with "the difficulty of assuming a past that has removed itself from every moral system and that, because of this, is revealed as largely unspeakable...in spite of all that Fontaine insists on doing it, by dint of conferring a moral value to the events by accepting them as thus". Masilover Rodenas in the daily paper La Vanguardia from Barcelona commented that "we are playing here with a confusion of genres (historical and fictitious)….people with various identities, capable of possessing but very rarely of giving. Or ingenuous people who have believed themselves capable of dying for an ideal. Everything is unmasked by the words of Lorena or Irene….La vida doble confirms Arturo Fontaine as one of the writers who best incorporates into his work the recent current of actual realism. Fontaine has given life to various political conflicts so as to convert them into powerful moral dilemmas dealing with heroism, treachery and the surrendering of ideals to a world that has none". In Ana Josefa Silva's opinion, the novel "has managed to convey, like nothing before – neither in the cinema, nor literature nor even in the theatre – our complex and difficult recent history in a lucid, convincing and intimate way". Pedro Gandolfo says that the novel maintains "a vigorous tension, because even though it is fiction, it underlines the possibilities of using fiction to tell the story of such horrendous events…..Fontaine’s technique is outstanding in describing violent and confused scenarios".

Marcos Aguinis wrote in the daily paper La Nación, Buenos Aires

This novel deserves to last. Based on real events, like a corkscrew it twists its way into the depths of the human condition. It shocks, disturbs, reveals and maintains a tremendous suspense from beginning to end….a book that is different.

==== Reviews "La vida doble" ====
Silvia Hopenhayn:An exceptional novel, in which the painful becomes more humane.

Alberto Manguel, writing in The Guardian said:

"...A relentlessly harrowing book... Fontaine's novel is... a scientific report on the extremes of our behaviour. Not monsters but men and women, like any one of us, did these things and will do them again."

The Times Literary Supplement

"Lorena is... too malleable, and too intelligent; she is easily swayed and her clever and devious mind is ready with rationalizations every time. And yet she is the incarnation of the mostrous evil... The gap between that terrible fact and complexity of the woman seen in close-up is at the heart of this gripping novel. What makes one read on with wide-eye amazement is a sense of humility... I can think of novel which makes torture and abuse of human rights... seem more repugnant. But it does so in an original manner..."

And Will Corral in World Literature Today writes:

"[A] masterpiece...(A) lucid and moving novel... Fontaine's eloquent and coherent achievement... surpasses his national and Latin American cohort...Peerless as testimony, infinitely, memorable as a reassessment of memory's role in narrative, La Vida doble is a model and in myriad ways a closing statement for authenticating historical periods. ...A whirlwind of self-estrangement, ideologically virtuous obsessions, bold sexuality, unalloyed grief, bottomless invectives... and, above all, page-turning psychological suspense. ... In great measure translator Megan McDowell relays La Vida doble's brilliance."

Mario Vargas Llosa Writes:

"The first pages of La Vida Doble are so powerful, of such truly convulsive dramatic composition, that it seems almost impossible for the story to maintain the tension until the end. Nonetheless, the truth is that almost all the novel’s action scenes regain the electrifying atmosphere of the beginning, making the reader live through extraordinary suspense and emotion. . . . A novel that as a whole shows great ambition, a very serious documentary undertaking, and a great dexterity in structure and style. It should be read in one sitting, and one emerges from its pages quite shaken."

Carlos Fuentes, "Babelia" Writes:

"La Vida Doble delves into moral dilemmas and betrayal. No one better represents contemporary Chilean narrative than Arturo Fontaine."

The New York Review of Books:

"Fontaine’s novel poses uneasy questions aimed at challenging the reader’s moral judgments. His way of creating suspense in describing the actions is itself morally challenging. In Lorena, Fontaine has created a forbidding character."

Los Angeles Review of Books:

"Lorena, talking nonstop, does so from a place beyond where language is truly comprehensible. ...She is a complex and original creation, acutely alert to the dark, even perverting, powers of her own story. She expresses no remorse...And yet, tragically, there was innocence. ...Lorena was in many ways a literary romantic."

== Y entonces Teresa ==
This is his fourth novel, set for first edition release by Catalonia in Santiago, Chile, in December 2024. Centered on the life of Teresa Wilms, it uniquely explores how a notorious love affair—pieced together from both archival documents and vivid family testimonies—sparked scandal and forever altered lives. These firsthand stories, shared by those closest to Teresa, are reimagined in prose that both entertains and illuminates, offering readers a personal perspective distinct from traditional biographies.

Sonia Montencino wrote:

"This novel speaks of an era, a woman, and a desire. It is the story of a rebellious impulse that finds expression in female liberation, but whose consequence is loss and sacrifice. A metaphor for rebellion that only produces death, for love that withers in illness and addiction, for women's literature, and for motherhood punished for the sake of maintaining a certain social order."

Carla Gulfenbein:

"The most subtle shifts of a woman's heart and of an era. A touching novel where only truth exists."

Lucía Santa Cruz:

"A book that is impossible to put down once you start reading it. Subtle humor offers a keen portrait of an era oscillating between tradition and modernity, brimming with change and challenges, especially for women."

Raúl Zurita:

"Against the backdrop of early 20th-century Chile, And Then Teresa recreates a story of love and anguish, masterfully demonstrating a style of storytelling and writing that we thought was lost."

David Gallagher

"Y entonces Teresa is beautifully written.... There is great music to Fontaine’s sentences... One of the book’s most intriguing features is that its characters laugh a lot – more than in any other novel I can think of. Fontaine has turned laughter into a supplementary language, a complement to the words the characters exchange, a gauge of their emotions."

Christopher Domínguez

"It is a lie that love is blind; what is blind is heartbreak... you need to have traversed the entire 20th-century novel to model a book that narrates a tragic life and, at the same time, present a plausible sketch of the emotion of love."

== Prizes ==
- Philosophy of Science Award David H. Ziff 1981, with a jury presided over by Professor Ernest Nagel
- Premio Las Americas 2011 for La vida doble (awarded at the Festival de la Palabra of Puerto Rico)
- Premio Jose Nuez Martin 2011 for La vida doble (awarded by the Foundation of the same name and the Faculty of Letters of the Catholic University of Chile)
