= 2005–06 Chilean general election =

- Presidential election
- 11 December 2005 (first round); 15 January 2006 (second round)
- Turnout: 87.67% (first round) ▼2.28pp 87.12% (second round) ▼3.51pp
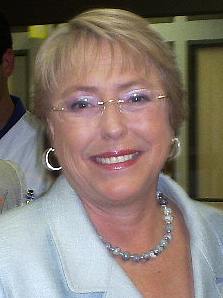

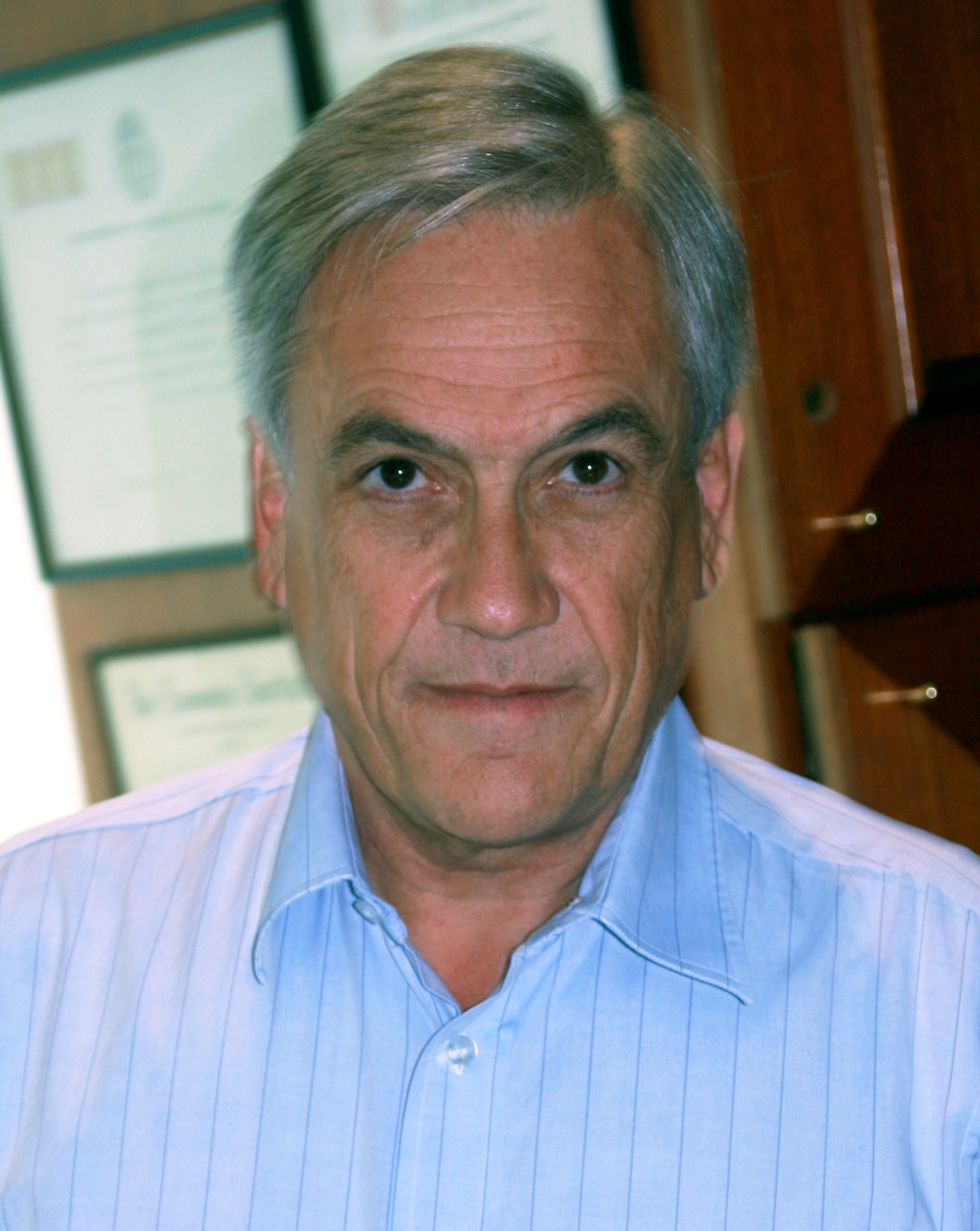
Candidate	Michelle Bachelet	Sebastián Piñera
Party	Socialist	National Renewal
Alliance	Concertación	Alliance
Popular vote	3,723,019	3,236,394
Percentage	53.50%	46.50%
President before election
Ricardo Lagos
For Democracy
Elected President
Michelle Bachelet
Socialist
- Chamber of Deputies
- 11 December 2005
- All 120 seats in the Chamber of Deputies; 61 seats needed for a majority
Party	Vote %	Seats	+/–
Concertación	51.76	65	+3
Alliance	38.72	54	−3
FRI	1.17	1	+1
This lists parties that won seats. See the complete results below.
- Senate
- 11 December 2005
- 20 of 38 seats in the Senate
Party	Vote %	Seats	+/–
Concertación	51.32	20	0
Alliance	37.25	17	0
This lists parties that won seats. See the complete results below.

General elections were held in Chile on Sunday, 11 December 2005 to elect the president and members of the National Congress. None of the four presidential candidates received an absolute majority, leading to a runoff election between the top two candidates — Michelle Bachelet from the Coalition of Parties for Democracy and Sebastián Piñera from National Renewal — on Sunday, 15 January 2006. Bachelet was victorious with 53.49% of the vote. She succeeded President Ricardo Lagos on 11 March 2006, for a period of four years, after Congress reformed the Constitution in September 2005 and reduced the term from six years.

== Electoral system ==
The president was elected using the two-round system. All of the 120 seats in the Chamber of Deputies were contested, while 20 out of 38 seats in the Senate were up for election (even-numbered regions and the metropolitan region). Deputies serve for a period of four years, while senators serve for a period of eight years. Reelection is permitted.

A unique binomial system was used for election of Chamber of Deputies. These system rewards coalition slates. Each coalition could run two candidates for each electoral district's two Chamber seats. Typically, the two largest coalitions in a district divided the seats, one each, among themselves. Only if the leading coalition ticket out-polls the second-place coalition by a margin of more than two-to-one did the winning coalition gain both seats. with seats allocated using the simple quotient.

== Presidential candidates ==
=== Michelle Bachelet (Socialist Party of Chile) ===
Bachelet, who led in every major poll, served as Health Minister before President Lagos named her as Chile's first female Defense Minister in 2002. She was supported by the Coalition of Parties for Democracy, which has governed Chile since 1990. The coalition groups four parties: the Christian Democratic Party (PDC), the Party for Democracy (PPD), the Socialist Party (PS), and the Social Democrat Radical Party (PRSD).

Up until May 2005 two candidates vied for the coalition's nomination: Soledad Alvear (PDC) and Michelle Bachelet (PS). A primary was scheduled to be held on 31 July 2005, to choose the nominee. Political polls in Chile indicated that either candidate would trounce the right-wing Alliance nominee Joaquín Lavín in a two-person race. The political atmosphere changed, however, when another Alianza candidate came to the scene: businessman Sebastián Piñera from the center-right National Renewal. This led, among other reasons, to the withdrawal of Soledad Alvear from the Concertación nomination on 24 May 2005.

=== Tomás Hirsch (Humanist Party) ===
Hirsch, a Humanist, ran as his party's nominee for president for 1999 obtaining 0.5%. On this election he ran with the support of the political pact Juntos Podemos Más (Together We Can Do More), which is made up mainly of the legally constituted Communist and Humanist parties plus other political groups and social organizations. In previous elections the candidates presented independently by the pact's parties were consistently in third place, behind the two major coalitions, and holding poll numbers in the single-digit level.

To elect a single candidate a national public survey was held on 28 May 2005. On 5 June 2005, an assembly elected Humanist Tomás Hirsch as their final candidate. Other pre-candidates included: Julián Alcayaga (Committee for the Defense of Copper) and Nicolás García (Block for Socialism). Two candidates withdrew before the survey and gave their support to Hirsch: Tomás Moulian (Communist) and Manuel Jacques (Christian Left). One candidate withdrew before the assembly: Jorge Pavez (Social Force).

=== Joaquín Lavín (Independent Democratic Union) ===
Lavín ran as the Alliance's nominee for president in 1999, losing in a tight 2000 runoff to Lagos. Considered for a long time prior to the 2005 election as the Alliance's unique candidate, as the contest drew nearer, however, his public persona began to lose credibility, perhaps due to a mediocre mayorship of the Santiago municipality the previous years, and his candidacy began to lose steam, to the point that it was called into question. RN, the Alliance's other party, decided to compete with Lavín with a candidate of their own (Piñera), breaking up the Alliance's unity in the election.

=== Sebastián Piñera (National Renewal) ===
Piñera was proclaimed a candidate by the National Renewal party on 14 May 2005. His nomination caused discomfort within the Independent Democratic Union (UDI—its fellow coalition party member), as both parties were supposed to support Lavín as the single coalition candidate. A primary proposed by UDI to elect a single candidate representing the Alliance was rejected by RN. Piñera's nomination was welcomed by the public and won quick support in opinion polls.

=== Rejected candidacy ===
The independent Mapuche candidate Aucán Huilcamán registered his nomination on 12 September, but it was rejected three days later by the Electoral Commission (Servicio Electoral) due to his failure to obtain the minimum number of signatures required by law for an independent candidacy. Huilcamán appealed using the argument that in the past parliamentary election there was a law created specifically to help the candidates of the Christian Democracy Party re-register their candidacies. After the support given to Huilcamán by other candidates, the government sent a bill to Congress, with immediate discussion, to extend the time of registration; a bill that would have also helped 17 other candidacies that were rejected by the Electoral Service. Nonetheless the bill was rejected by a lack of quorum, denying Huilcamán a possible place in the ballot.

== Parliamentary election ==
The Chamber of Deputies prior to this election was composed of 62 CPD deputies (23 Christian Democrats, 20 PPD, ten Socialists, six PRSD and three independents), 57 APC deputies (31 UDI, 18 RN and eight independents) and one independent (off-pact).

The Senate prior to this election was composed of 38 directly elected senators and nine non-elected senators (institutional senators, or senators for life). Among the elected, 20 seats are held by the CPD (eleven Christian Democrats, five Socialists, three PPD and one PRSD) and 18 by the APC (six independents, six UDI and six RN). A constitutional reform in 2005 eliminated non-elected senators starting on 11 March 2006, the day the newly elected senators were sworn in.

Of the Senate seats being contested, eleven were held by the CPD (ten Christian Democrats and one Socialist) and nine by the APC (four independents, three UDI and two RN).

== Campaign ==
=== Debates ===
There were two scheduled debates between the presidential candidates during the first round, both including all four candidates. A third televised debate was dismissed by the respective campaign teams. However, during the second debate, Tomás Hirsch said he was open to a third debate.

The first debate, titled Foro Presidencial: Chile 2005, organized by the Latin American station CNN en Español and the local Canal 13, took place on 19 October, at 10 p.m., at Espacio Riesco in Santiago. It ran for one hour, giving each candidate ten minutes to answer seven questions, giving priority to national issues. There was no studio audience. It was hosted by Glenda Umaña (CNN en Español) and Constanza Santa María (Canal 13).

The second debate took place on 16 November at 10 p.m., at the CasaPiedra venue in Santiago. It was organized by Anatel (National Television Association), and was broadcast by Canal 13, TVN, Megavisión and Chilevisión, with TVN in charge of production. Running for one hour and 40 minutes, a question was asked to each candidate by a panel of four journalists. The four candidates were seated behind desks on stage, instead of standing at podiums as they had done in the first debate.

Prior to the second round, Bachelet and Piñera held a televised debate on 4 January 2006, which was organized by Anatel and broadcast by the four main over-the-air television channels. A Time Research poll showed that Bachelet was the winner of the debate with 49%, against 41% for Piñera. On the other hand, another poll, by El Mercurio-Opina, showed that Piñera won the debate with 43.3% of the preferences against 42.9% for Bachelet.

Piñera offered Bachelet to hold a second debate before the election, to discuss regional issues, but this was rejected by Bachelet's campaign team. Bachelet also turned down a radio debate with Piñera.

== Opinion polls ==
June/July 2005 opinion poll results

October/November 2005 opinion poll results

December 2005/January 2006 opinion poll results

Opinion polls released after Sebastián Piñera's entrance and Soledad Alvear's withdrawal showed Michelle Bachelet leading the right-wing candidates (Piñera and Joaquín Lavín) by a wide margin, but below the 50% plus 1 vote needed to win the election, a situation that would lead to a runoff in which, according to the same polls, she would comfortably defeat any of the two right-wing candidates. Some analysts commented that in some of these polls Bachelet would indeed have obtained an absolute majority in the first round, if blanks were discarded and undecided votes were evenly distributed among candidates. However, later opinion polls released nearer the election showed a decline of Bachelet in favor of Piñera and Tomás Hirsch, showing more clearly that the election would be decided in a runoff.

The first opinion poll released after the first round, published by El Mercurio-Opina on 18 December, had Bachelet with 42.8%, Piñera with 37.5% and 19.7% undecided. Later opinion polls showed similar results, except for one poll showing Piñera above Bachelet by 1%. The polls released showed on average that Bachelet maintained an advantage over Piñera above 5%, but with a large number of voters (18%) still undecided or that would not declare a preference. If this last percentage was removed from the vote, then Bachelet, the polls showed, would have won the presidency by a margin above 7%, which was accurate with the final results of the election.

== Results ==
=== President ===
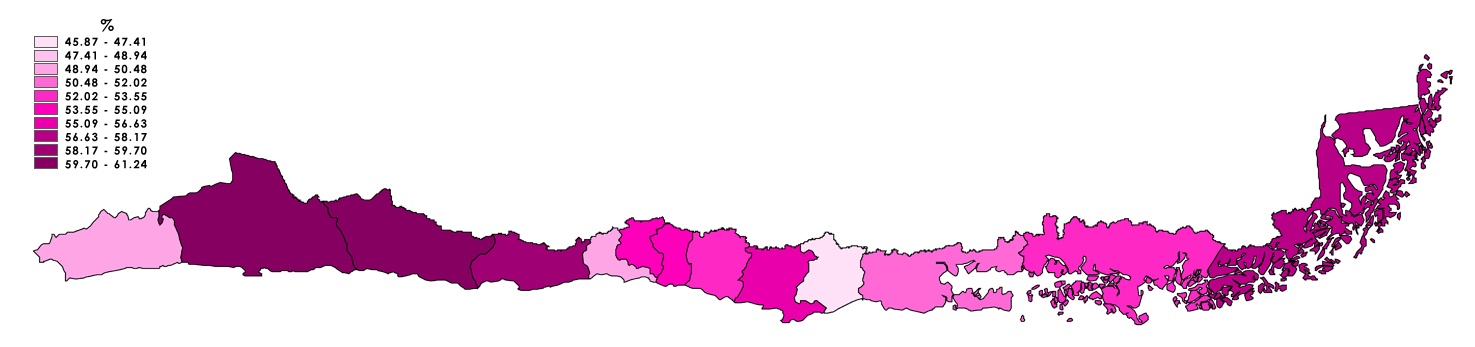
Strength of Bachelet's vote by administrative region. A deeper magenta indicates a higher percentage of the vote obtained by Bachelet in that region.

The first government announcement regarding election results came at 6:30 p.m. local time (21:30 GMT), and included information from around 12% of polling stations counted. Subsequent preliminary results were announced during the day by the Interior Ministry undersecretary and published on a special Internet site. These results indicated that the election was to be decided in a runoff on 15 January 2006, in which Michelle Bachelet would face Sebastián Piñera. Official and final results, validated by the Electoral Tribunal (Tricel), were published on the Diario Oficial (official gazette) on 27 December 2005, and made the runoff election official.

On election day, at 9:30 p.m. local time, before the third preliminary results were announced, Joaquín Lavín conceded a second-place defeat in the election and said he would support Sebastián Piñera in the runoff election. Later in the day, JPM candidate Tomás Hirsch said he would nullify his vote in the upcoming runoff; an opinion which was objected by the pact's Communist wing, which said they would support Bachelet if five proposals delivered to her were accepted and incorporated into the candidate's government program; these proposals dealt with changing the electoral system and granting workers more rights.

The runoff election between Michelle Bachelet and Sebastián Piñera took place on 15 January 2006.

Final results were announced on 30 January 2006, by the Electoral Tribunal. They indicated that Michelle Bachelet won the presidency with 53.49% of the votes classified as valid, 51.98% of the total votes cast, and 45.28% support of registered voters.

Sebastián Piñera conceded defeat immediately following a government announcement made on election day that included results from 97.52% of ballot boxes counted.

Candidate	Party	First round		Second round	
Candidate	Party	Votes	%	Votes	%
Michelle Bachelet	Concertación (PS)	3,190,691	45.96	3,723,019	53.50
Sebastián Piñera	National Renewal	1,763,694	25.41	3,236,394	46.50
Joaquín Lavín	Independent Democratic Union	1,612,608	23.23		
Tomás Hirsch	Juntos Podemos Más (PH)	375,048	5.40		
**Total**		**6,942,041**	**100.00**	**6,959,413**	**100.00**
Valid votes		6,942,041	96.32	6,959,413	97.17
Invalid/blank votes		265,237	3.68	202,932	2.83
Total votes		**7,207,278**	**100.00**	**7,162,345**	**100.00**
Registered voters/turnout		8,220,897	87.67	8,220,897	87.12
Source: SERVEL (first round) SERVEL (second round)

=== Senate ===
Party or alliance		Votes	%	Seats		
Party or alliance		Votes	%	Won	Not up	Total
Concertación	Christian Democratic Party	1,418,089	29.72	5	2	7
Concertación	Socialist Party	576,045	12.07	4	4	8
Concertación	Party for Democracy	512,296	10.74	1	2	3
Concertación	Social Democratic Radical Party	114,515	2.40	1	1	2
Concertación	Independents	38,053	0.80	0	0	0
Concertación	Total	2,658,998	55.73	11	9	20
Alliance	Independent Democratic Union	1,028,925	21.57	5	4	9
Alliance	National Renewal	515,185	10.80	3	5	8
Alliance	Independents	233,180	4.89	0	0	0
Alliance	Total	1,777,290	37.25	8	9	17
Juntos Podemos Más	Communist Party	104,687	2.19	0	0	0
Juntos Podemos Más	Humanist Party	69,927	1.47	0	0	0
Juntos Podemos Más	Independents	111,460	2.34	0	0	0
Juntos Podemos Más	Total	286,074	6.00	0	0	0
Independent Regionalist Force	National Alliance of Independents	13,076	0.27	0	0	0
Independent Regionalist Force	Independents	17,268	0.36	0	0	0
Independent Regionalist Force	Total	60,688	1.27	0	0	0
Independents		18,275	0.38	1	0	1
**Total**		**4,770,981**	**100.00**	**20**	**18**	**38**
Valid votes		4,770,981	92.06			
Invalid/blank votes		411,243	7.94			
Total votes		**5,182,224**	**100.00**			
Registered voters/turnout		5,863,704	88.38			
Source: Election Resources, Psephos

=== Chamber of Deputies ===
Party or alliance		Votes	%	Seats	+/–
Concertación	Christian Democratic Party	1,370,501	20.76	20	–3
Concertación	Party for Democracy	1,017,956	15.42	21	+1
Concertación	Socialist Party of Chile	663,561	10.05	15	+5
Concertación	Social Democratic Radical Party	233,564	3.54	7	+1
Concertación	Independents	131,625	1.99	2	–1
Concertación	Total	3,417,207	51.76	65	+3
Alliance	Independent Democratic Union	1,475,901	22.36	33	+2
Alliance	National Renewal	932,422	14.12	19	+1
Alliance	Independents	148,063	2.24	2	–6
Alliance	Total	2,556,386	38.72	54	–3
Juntos Podemos Más	Communist Party of Chile	339,547	5.14	0	0
Juntos Podemos Más	Humanist Party	102,842	1.56	0	0
Juntos Podemos Más	Independents	46,229	0.70	0	–
Juntos Podemos Más	Total	488,618	7.40	0	New
Independent Regionalist Force	Regionalist Action Party of Chile	26,698	0.40	1	New
Independent Regionalist Force	National Alliance of Independents	20,191	0.31	0	New
Independent Regionalist Force	Independents	30,324	0.46	0	–
Independent Regionalist Force	Total	77,213	1.17	1	New
Independents		62,387	0.94	0	–1
**Total**		**6,601,811**	**100.00**	**120**	**0**
Valid votes		6,601,811	91.60		
Invalid/blank votes		605,540	8.40		
Total votes		**7,207,351**	**100.00**		
Registered voters/turnout		8,220,897	87.67		
Source: SERVEL

=== Elected members ===
Elected candidates appear in bold. (R) indicates candidates running for re-election. Strikethrough names indicate candidacies rejected by the Electoral Service (Servel).

==== Chamber of Deputies ====
Dist.	Concertación	Alliance	Juntos Podemos Más	Independent Regionalist Force	Independents
1	Rolando Caviedes (PDC)	Ximena Valcarce (RN)	Juan Riveros (PC)	Bernardo Olivos (PAR)	Nino Baltolú
1	(R) Iván Paredes (PS)	(R) Rosa González (UDI)	Ricardo Pacheco (PH)	Wanda Clemente (Ind.)	Nino Baltolú
2	Raúl Bagioli (PDC)	Espártago Ferrari (RN)	Pedro Cisterna (PC)	Marta Isasi (PAR)	none
2	(R) Fulvio Rossi (PS)	Julio Lagos (UDI)	Sara Chávez (Ind.)	~~Eduardo Alberto Prieto (PAR)~~	none
3	(R) Waldo Mora (PDC)	Raúl Salinas (RN)	Daniel Ramírez (PC)	Jorge Godoy (Ind.)	~~Esteban Velásquez~~
3	Marcos Espinosa (PRSD)	Felipe Ward (UDI)	Francisco Avendaño (PH)	Miguel Urrelo (Ind.)	~~Esteban Velásquez~~
4	(R) Pedro Araya (PDC)	Daniel Guevara (Ind.)	Luis Sagredo (PC)	Raúl Zepeda (Ind.)	none
4	Hernán Rivera (Ind.)	(R) Manuel Rojas (UDI)	Pedro Luque (PH)	Rosa Pérez (Ind.)	none
5	Erick Villegas (PDC)	René Aedo (RN)	Gastón Quezada (PC)	Jorge Cuello (PAR)	~~Carlos Vilches~~
5	(R) Antonio Leal (PPD)	Alberto Calvo (UDI)	Carlos Toro (PH)	Jorge Cuello (PAR)	~~Carlos Vilches~~
6	(R) Jaime Mulet (PDC)	Berta Torres (RN)	Isabel Irribarren (PC)	Cristián Tapia (Ind.)	none
6	(R) Alberto Robles (PRSD)	José Luis Uriarte (UDI)	Lorena Ortega (PH)	Cristián Tapia (Ind.)	none
7	Ricardo Cifuentes (PDC)	(R) Mario Bertolino (RN)	Eric Campos (PC)	none	none
7	Marcelo Díaz (PS)	Francisco Eguiguren (UDI)	Luis Vega (PC)	none	none
8	(R) Patricio Walker (PDC)	Alberto Gallardo (RN)	Miguel Solís (PC)	none	none
8	(R) Francisco Encina (PS)	Fernando Cordero (UDI)	Mario González (PH)	none	none
9	Renán Fuentealba (PDC)	Fernando Goncalves (RN)	Julio Ugas (PC)	none	~~Agapito Santander~~
9	(R) Adriana Muñoz (PPD)	(R) Darío Molina (UDI)	Rubén Ruiz (PC)	none	~~Agapito Santander~~
10	(R) María Eugenia Mella (PDC)	(R) Alfonso Vargas (RN)	Daniel Jadué (PC)	none	none
10	Marco Enríquez-Ominami (PS)	Alfonso Ríos (UDI)	Jaime Romero (PH)	none	none
11	(R) Patricio Cornejo (PDC)	Gaspar Rivas (RN)	Mario Méndez (PC)	none	none
11	Marco Núñez (PPD)	(R) Marcelo Forni (UDI)	Carlos Muñoz (PH)	none	none
12	Humberto de la Maza (PDC)	Amelia Herrera (RN)	Danilo Ahumada (PC)	none	none
12	(R) Juan Bustos (PS)	Osvaldo Urrutia (UDI)	Martín Ristempart (PH)	none	none
13	Álex Avsolomovich (PDC)	Joaquín Godoy (RN)	Óscar Aroca (PC)	none	none
13	(R) Laura Soto (PPD)	Luis Parot (UDI)	Rafael Henríquez (PH)	none	none
14	Raúl Allard (PDC)	Francisco Chahuán (RN)	Felipe Zavala (PC)	none	none
14	(R) Rodrigo González (PPD)	(R) Gonzalo Ibáñez (UDI)	Luis Aravena (Ind.)	none	none
15	Osvaldo Badenier (PDC)	(R) Carlos Hidalgo (Ind.)	Maximiliano Miranda (PC)	none	Sergio Velasco
15	(R) Samuel Venegas (PRSD)	Edmundo Eluchans (UDI)	Aníbal Reyna (Ind.)	none	Sergio Velasco
16	Gabriel Silber (PDC)	Peter Retamales (RN)	Carmen Hertz (PC)	none	none
16	Fanny Pollarolo (PS)	(R) Patricio Melero (UDI)	Osvaldo Toro (PH)	none	none
17	Sergio Espejo (PDC)	Karla Rubilar (RN)	Jorge Insunza (PC)	none	none
17	(R) María Antonieta Saa (PPD)	Álvaro Cruzat (UDI)	Juan López (PH)	none	none
18	(R) Carlos Olivares (PDC)	Pedro Pablo Díaz (RN)	Óscar Hernández (PC)	none	none
18	Guido Girardi Briere (PPD)	Miguel Schweitzer (UDI)	José Antonio Salinas (PH)	none	none
19	Mauricio Castro (PDC)	Pablo Rochet (RN)	Germán Llanca (Ind.)	none	~~Alejandro Reyes~~
19	(R) Patricio Hales (PPD)	Claudia Nogueira (UDI)	Nicolás García (Ind.)	none	~~Alejandro Reyes~~
20	Luis Pareto (PDC)	Roberto Sepúlveda (RN)	Juan Andrés Lagos (PC)	none	none
20	Álvaro Escobar (PPD)	(R) Mario Varela (UDI)	Valdemar Sanhueza (Ind.)	none	none
21	(R) Jorge Burgos (PDC)	Juan Guillermo Vivado (RN)	Jaime Gajardo (PC)	none	none
21	Patricia Silva (PS)	(R) Marcela Cubillos (UDI)	Juan Carlos Gálvez (PH)	none	none
22	Ricardo Hormazábal (PDC)	Carmen Ibáñez (RN)	Claudia Pascual (PC)	none	none
22	(R) Carolina Tohá (PPD)	(R) Alberto Cardemil (Ind.)	Claudia Manríquez (PH)	none	none
23	Clemente Pérez (PDC)	Cristián Monckeberg (RN)	Antonieta Vera (PC)	none	none
23	Leopoldo Sánchez (PPD)	(R) Julio Dittborn (UDI)	Carlos Padilla (PH)	none	none
24	Marigen Hornkohl (PDC)	Francisco López (RN)	Francisco Villa (PC)	none	none
24	(R) Enrique Accorsi (PPD)	(R) María Angélica Cristi (UDI)	Susana Córdova (PH)	none	none
25	Marcelo Ortiz (PDC)	Raquel Argandoña (RN)	Amaro Labra (PC)	none	~~José Pedro Weinstein~~
25	(R) Ximena Vidal (PPD)	(R) Felipe Salaberry (UDI)	Juan Enrique Prieto (PH)	none	~~José Pedro Weinstein~~
26	Gonzalo Duarte (PDC)	Miguel Navarro (RN)	Julio Oliva (PC)	none	~~Pedro Ávalos~~
26	(R) Carlos Montes (PS)	Gustavo Alessandri (UDI)	Raúl Florcita Alarcón (PH)	none	~~Pedro Ávalos~~
27	(R) Eliana Caraball (PDC)	Carlos Contreras (RN)	Ercides Martínez (PC)	none	none
27	Tucapel Jiménez (Ind.)	(R) Iván Moreira (UDI)	Mónica Quilodrán (Ind.)	none	none
28	(R) Rodolfo Seguel (PDC)	Julio Ibarra (RN)	Eduardo Contreras (PC)	none	none
28	Jorge Insunza (PPD)	(R) Darío Paya (UDI)	Claudina Núñez (PC)	none	none
29	Teresa Montrone (PDC)	(R) Maximiano Errázuriz (RN)	Manuel Hernández (PC)	none	none
29	(R) Isabel Allende (PS)	Pablo Desbordes (UDI)	Patricio Bell (PH)	none	none
30	(R) Edgardo Riveros (PDC)	Rosa Oyarce (RN)	Sergio Castro (PC)	none	none
30	Ramón Farías (PPD)	(R) José Antonio Kast (UDI)	Tania Figueroa (PH)	none	none
31	Francisco Puga (PDC)	Alberto Haddad (RN)	Marcela Mallea (PC)	none	none
31	Denise Pascal (PS)	(R) Gonzalo Uriarte (UDI)	Luis Leoncio Álvarez (PH)	none	none
32	Juan Ramón Godoy (Ind.)	Luis Díaz (RN)	Pedro Aravena (PC)	none	none
32	(R) Esteban Valenzuela (PPD)	(R) Alejandro García-Huidobro (UDI)	Guido Oyarzún (PH)	none	none
33	Carlos Dupré (PDC)	Félix Ortiz (Ind.)	Carlos Poblete (PC)	none	none
33	Alejandro Sule (PRSD)	(R) Eugenio Bauer (UDI)	Sergio Mella (PH)	none	none
34	(R) Alejandra Sepúlveda (PDC)	Rodrigo Montt (Ind.)	José Figueroa (PC)	none	none
34	Alba Gallardo (PS)	(R) Juan Masferrer (UDI)	José Tejo (PH)	none	none
35	Juan Carlos Latorre (PDC)	César Molfino (Ind.)	Patricio Martínez (PC)	none	none
35	Rubén Andino (PS)	(R) Ramón Barros (UDI)	Mauro Pantoja (PH)	none	none
36	Roberto León (PDC)	Matías Carrozzi (RN)	Wladimir Pulgar (PC)	none	~~Moisés Lucero~~
36	Raúl Bravo (PS)	(R) Sergio Correa (UDI)	María Eliana Astaburuaga (PH)	none	~~Moisés Lucero~~
37	Christian Suárez (PDC)	Germán Verdugo (RN)	Edgardo Cáceres (PC)	none	none
37	(R) Sergio Aguiló (PS)	(R) Pablo Prieto (UDI)	Óscar Vega (Ind.)	none	none
38	(R) Pablo Lorenzini (PDC)	(R) Pedro Pablo Álvarez-Salamanca (RN)	José Oróstica (PC)	none	none
38	Roberto Celedón (Ind.)	Eduardo Prieto (UDI)	~~Marcelo Mardones (Ind.)~~	none	none
39	Yenny Molina (Ind.)	(R) Osvaldo Palma (RN)	Mario Ibarra (PC)	none	none
39	(R) Jorge Tarud (PPD)	Christian Chadwick (UDI)	Roberto Gutiérrez (PH)	none	none
40	Ulises Urzúa (Ind.)	Juan Carlos Muñoz (RN)	Edgar Cifuentes (PC)	none	none
40	(R) Guillermo Ceroni (PPD)	(R) Ignacio Urrutia (UDI)	Juan Carlos Márquez (Ind.)	none	none
41	Claudio Huepe (PDC)	(R) Rosauro Martínez (RN)	Cristián Muñoz (PC)	none	none
41	(R) Carlos Abel Jarpa (PRSD)	Alejandro Arrau (UDI)	Claudio Ávila (Ind.)	none	none
42	Jorge Sabag (PDC)	(R) Nicolás Monckeberg (RN)	Luis Soto (PC)	none	~~José Roberto Santos~~
42	(R) Felipe Letelier (PPD)	René Barba (UDI)	Camilo Cabezas (PH)	none	~~José Roberto Santos~~
43	Sergio Micco (PDC)	Frank Sauerbaum (RN)	Alejandro Sepúlveda (PC)	none	Patricio Pinto
43	Raúl Súnico (PS)	(R) Jorge Ulloa (UDI)	Patricia Beltrán (PH)	none	Elicia Herrera
44	(R) José Miguel Ortiz (PDC)	Francisca Van Rysselberghe (Ind.)	Freddy Cabrera (PC)	none	Félix González
44	Maria Angélica Fuentes (PPD)	(R) Andrés Egaña (UDI)	Loreto Muñoz (PH)	none	Félix González
45	Germán Acuña (PDC)	Bernardo Ulloa (Ind.)	Iván Quintana (PC)	none	none
45	Clemira Pacheco (PS)	Sergio Bobadilla (UDI)	Isaías Gutiérrez (Ind.)	none	none
46	Edmundo Salas (PDC)	Ana Eugenia García Aillón (RN)	Guillermo Teillier (PC)	none	none
46	Manuel Monsalve (PS)	(R) Iván Norambuena (UDI)	Jorge Venegas (Ind.)	none	none
47	Marcelo Urrutia (PDC)	Gonzalo Arellano (RN)	Julio Aránguiz (PC)	none	none
47	(R) José Pérez (PRSD)	Juan Lobos (UDI)	~~Jorge Monje (PH)~~	none	none
48	Mario Venegas (PDC)	(R) Francisco Bayo (RN)	Domingo Marileo (PC)	Romnel Edgardo Aravena (ANI)	Sofía Painiqueo
48	Ricardo Navarrete (PRSD)	Gonzalo Arenas (UDI)	Juan Varela (Ind.)	Romnel Edgardo Aravena (ANI)	Sofía Painiqueo
49	Víctor Gárate (PDC)	Cristián Barra (RN)	Mauricio Teillier (PC)	Julio Villablanca (ANI)	none
49	(R) Jaime Quintana (PPD)	Enrique Estay (UDI)	Mario Poo (Ind.)	Eduardo Díaz (Ind.)	none
50	(R) Eduardo Saffirio (PDC)	(R) Germán Becker (RN)	Javier Chávez (PC)	Guillermo Allende (ANI)	Sergio Castillo
50	Carlos González (PRSD)	Gonzalo Navarrete (UDI)	Carlos Carter (PH)	Guillermo Allende (ANI)	~~Luis Seguel~~
51	(R) Eduardo Díaz (Ind.)	Hernán Viguera (RN)	Antonieta Faúndez (PC)	Laura Soto Ibacache (ANI)	~~Fernando Troncoso~~
51	(R) Eugenio Tuma (PPD)	René Fernández (UDI)	~~Jorge Zambrano (PH)~~	Laura Soto Ibacache (ANI)	~~Fernando Troncoso~~
52	Mario Acuña (PDC)	(R) René Manuel García (RN)	Francisco Painevilo (PC)	Miguel Ángel Arteaga (ANI)	none
52	(R) Fernando Meza (PRSD)	Alejandro Martini (UDI)	Pablo González (PH)	Miguel Ángel Arteaga (ANI)	none
53	(R) Exequiel Silva (PDC)	(R) Roberto Delmastro (Ind.)	Marcia Klein (PC)	Fredi Kirshbom (ANI)	none
53	Alfonso de Urresti (PS)	Sebastián Donoso (UDI)	Beatriz Hermosilla (Ind.)	Fredi Kirshbom (ANI)	none
54	Ricardo Halabí (PDC)	Ewald Wittke (RN)	Pedro Ruiz (PC)	Félix Montiel (ANI)	none
54	(R) Enrique Jaramillo (PPD)	(R) Gastón Von Muhlenbrock (UDI)	Pedro Ruiz (PC)	~~Guillermo Holtheuer (Ind.)~~	none
55	(R) Sergio Ojeda (PDC)	Beatriz Díaz (Ind.)	Patricio Miranda (PC)	Jaime Moreira (Ind.)	none
55	Fernando Soto (PS)	(R) Javier Hernández (UDI)	Claudio Soto (Ind.)	Jaime Moreira (Ind.)	none
56	Carlos Tudela (PDC)	Harry Jurgensen (RN)	Andrea Oyarzún (PC)	Jorge Blaessinger (Ind.)	none
56	(R) Fidel Espinoza (PS)	(R) Carlos Recondo (UDI)	Antonio Caileo (Ind.)	Jorge Blaessinger (Ind.)	none
57	Patricio Vallespín (PDC)	Eduardo Becker (RN)	Renato Alvarado (PC)	Pablo Muñoz (Ind.)	none
57	Sergio Galilea (PPD)	Marisol Turres (UDI)	Renato Alvarado (PC)	Pablo Muñoz (Ind.)	none
58	(R) Gabriel Ascencio (PDC)	Alejandro Santana (RN)	Mario Contreras (PC)	~~Minor Braniff (Ind.)~~	none
58	Juan José Cárcamo (PPD)	(R) Claudio Alvarado (UDI)	Luis Veloso (Ind.)	~~Minor Braniff (Ind.)~~	none
59	Eduardo Santelices (PDC)	(R) Pablo Galilea (RN)	Yasna Jara (PC)	Mercedes Mayorga (Ind.)	none
59	René Alinco (PPD)	Max Larraín (UDI)	Walter Ramírez (Ind.)	Mercedes Mayorga (Ind.)	none
60	Carolina Goic (PDC)	René Bobadilla (Ind.)	Jeannette Antonin (PC)	none	Miodrag Marinovic
60	Lidia Amarales (PPD)	(R) Rodrigo Álvarez (UDI)	Jaime Agurto (Ind.)	none	Miodrag Marinovic

Source: Tricel/Servel.

==== Senate ====
Cons.	Concertación	Alliance	Juntos Podemos Más	Independent Regionalist Force	Independents
2nd	(R) Carmen Frei (PDC)	(R) Carlos Cantero (RN)	Salvador Barrientos (PC)	Luis Thompson (Ind.)	none
2nd	José Antonio Gómez (PRSD)	Cristián Leay (UDI)	José Gabriel Feres (PH)	Humberto Zuleta (Ind.)	none
4th	(R) Jorge Pizarro (PDC)	Arturo Longton (RN)	Luis Aguilera (PC)	none	none
4th	Jorge Arrate (PS)	(R) Evelyn Matthei (UDI)	Joaquín Arduengo (PH)	none	none
7th	(R) Andrés Zaldívar (PDC)	Roberto Fantuzzi (Ind.)	Gonzalo Rovira (Ind.)	none	none
7th	Guido Girardi (PPD)	(R) Jovino Novoa (UDI)	Eduardo Artés (Ind.)	none	none
8th	Soledad Alvear (PDC)	Lily Pérez (RN)	Manuel Riesco (PC)	none	none
8th	Gonzalo Martner (PS)	Pablo Longueira (UDI)	Efrén Osorio (PH)	none	none
9th	Aníbal Pérez (PPD)	Ramón Achurra (Ind.)	Carmen Moncada (Ind.)	none	none
9th	Juan Pablo Letelier (PS)	(R) Andrés Chadwick (UDI)	Marilén Cabrera (PH)	none	none
12th	(R) Hosain Sabag (PDC)	Alberto Gyhra (Ind.)	Hugo Corvalán (Ind.)	none	none
12th	Alejandro Navarro (PS)	Carlos Bombal (UDI)	Wilfredo Alfsen (PH)	none	none
13th	(R) Mariano Ruiz-Esquide (PDC)	(R) Mario Ríos (RN)	Marta Morales (PC)	none	none
13th	Eleodoro Torres (Ind.)	Víctor Pérez (UDI)	Gloria Mujica (PH)	none	none
16th	Eduardo Frei (PDC)	Andrés Allamand (RN)	Guillermo Tripailaf (PC)	Raúl Silva (ANI)	none
16th	Marcos Saldías (PRSD)	Andrés Allamand (RN)	Hugo Gerter (Ind.)	Carlos Boero (ANI)	none
17th	(R) Sergio Páez (PDC)	Carlos Kuschel (RN)	Irma Alvarado (PC)	José Luis Cáceres (Ind.)	none
17th	Camilo Escalona (PS)	Joaquín Brahm (UDI)	Tomás Bize (Ind.)	Mario Osses (Ind.)	none
19th	Zarko Luksic (PDC)	Eduardo Catalán (Ind.)	José Foppiano (Ind.)	none	Carlos Bianchi
19th	Pedro Muñoz (PS)	(R) Sergio Fernández (UDI)	Fernando Ortiz (PH)	none	~~Manuel Barrera~~

Source: Tricel/Servel.

== Election timeline ==
- 5 January 2005: Former president Eduardo Frei declines a possible presidential candidacy.
- 14 January 2005: Soledad Alvear defeats senator Adolfo Zaldívar in an internal primary, and is proclaimed presidential pre-candidate by the PDC.
- 24 April 2005: Michelle Bachelet is proclaimed presidential candidate by PRSD.
- 27 April 2005: Alvear and Bachelet hold a televised primary debate in Hualpén.
- 14 May 2005: Sebastián Piñera is proclaimed presidential candidate by National Renewal.
- 24 May 2005: Alvear declines her presidential pre-candidacy.
- 5 June 2005: Tomás Hirsch is proclaimed presidential candidate of pact Juntos Podemos Más.
- 19 June 2005: Joaquín Lavín is proclaimed presidential candidate by the Independent Democratic Union.
- 30 July 2005: Bachelet is proclaimed presidential candidate by PDC.
- 21 August 2005: Bachelet is proclaimed presidential candidate by PS and PPD.
- 7 September 2005: RN candidate Sebastián Piñera officially registers his candidacy for president.
- 8 September 2005: CPD candidate Michelle Bachelet officially registers her candidacy for president, as does UDI candidate Joaquín Lavín.
- 11 September 2005: Deadline for voters to register.
- 12 September 2005: Deadline for candidates to register and official start of campaigning. During the day, independent candidate Aucán Huilcamán officially registers his candidacy for president, as does JPM candidate Tomás Hirsch.
- 15 September 2005: The Electoral Service (Servel) rejects the candidacy of Mapuche leader Aucán Huilcamán.
- 19 October 2005: The first televised debate among all candidates takes place.
- 11 November 2005: The free televised campaign time begins with candidate receiving five minutes each; street ads are allowed.
- 16 November 2005: The second televised debate among all candidates takes place.
- 6 December 2005: Bachelet cancels her final campaign rally after five of her supporters are killed in a bus crash.
- 9 December 2005: Official campaigning ends at midnight; electoral publicity is no longer allowed.
- 11 December 2005: Election day. Voting begins at 7 AM local time (10:00 GMT).
- 26 December 2005: The Electoral Tribunal (Tricel) publishes the final and official results of the first round election.
- 27 December 2005: First round results are published on the Official Gazette.
- 1 January 2006: Electoral campaigning for the runoff election begins. Each candidate receives two and a half minutes of free television airtime.
- 4 January 2006: The only televised debate between the two runoff candidates takes place.
- 12 January 2006: Official campaigning ends.
- 15 January 2006: Runoff election takes place. Socialist candidate Michelle Bachelet is elected president.
- 30 January 2006: The Tricel publishes the final and official results of the runoff election.
- 30 January 2006: President-elect Michelle Bachelet announces the members of her cabinet.
- 11 March 2006: President-elect Bachelet is sworn in by the National Congress in Valparaíso.

== See also ==
- Politics of Chile
- List of political parties in Chile
- List of female Chilean presidential candidates
