= Alejandra Bravo Hidalgo =

Chilean politician

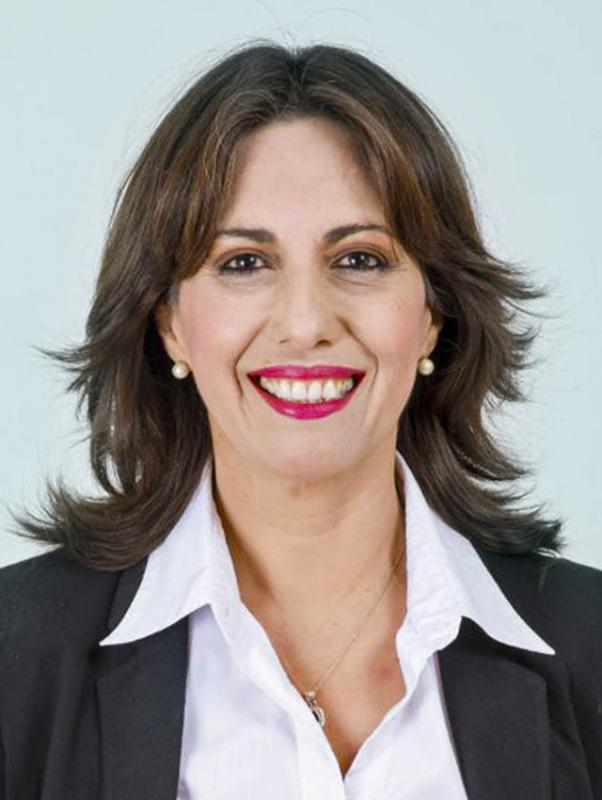
- Official portrait of Bravo in 2018.

Undersecretary of National Assets of Chile
- In office 2018–2019
- Preceded by: Jorge Maldonado Contreras
- Succeeded by: Álvaro Pillado Irribarra

President of the Independent Regionalist Party
- In office 2015–2018
- Preceded by: Humberto de la Maza Maillet
- Succeeded by: Eduardo Salas Cerda

Councilwoman of Colina
- In office 2000–2008

Personal details
- Born: 1964 (age 61–62) Santiago, Chile
- Party: NCM (2019-2020); Independent Regionalist Party (2007-2018); Christian Democratic Party (1988-2007)
- Education: INACAP
- Occupation: Executive Secretary and Politician

Alejandra María Bravo Hidalgo (born November 1964) is a Chilean politician, who was active in the Independent Regionalist Party (PRI) until its dissolution in 2018. She served as president of the party between 2015 and 2018.

From March 2018 to November 2019, she was Undersecretary of National Assets during the second government of Sebastián Piñera. Previously, she was a councillor for Colina for two terms from 2000 to 2008.

== Early life and education ==
Bravo was born in Santiago, Chile, in November 1964. She is the second of three siblings, with an older brother, José Manuel, and a younger sister, Marcela. Her mother Zunilda del Carmen Hidalgo Casanova was a seamstress and her father Carlos Ernesto Bravo Fernández worked for the Social Security Service. The family grew up in Chacabuco, and later moved to Esmeralda, in the district of Colina.

Bravo went to primary school in Esmeralda, and completed her secondary education in Santiago. After high school, she studied for a professional diploma at INACAP (Instituto Instituto Nacional de Capacitación Profesional), the national institute for professional training. Later, she studied social communication at UNIACC.

== Political career ==
In 1983, Bravo entered politics after seeing the rector of INACAP replaced by a retired military officer. Bravo was first drawn to the Christian Democratic Party (PDC), and decided to join after meeting the PDC politician, Adolfo Zaldívar. Bravo became president of the Christian Democratic Youth (JDC) in Colina and campaigned for 'No to Pinochet' in the 1988 plebiscite.

With Patricio Aylwin as president, Bravo moved away from politics and dedicated herself to business, opening an agricultural company with her father and brother. Bravo returned to politics as a councillor for Colina from 2000 and 2008. In 2008, she ran for mayor but lost to the Independent Democratic Union candidate (UDI), Mario Olavarria.

In 2007, Adolfo Zaldívar was expelled from the Christian Democrats after criticizing the implementation of the new urban public transport system, Transantiago, and formed the Independent Regionalist Party (PRI). Bravo followed, and joined the PRI. There she met her partner, Eduardo Salas, who was then the secretary general of the PRI. Under Zaldívar, Bravo gained influence and in 2015 she became the president of PRI, an office she held until 2018 when she was succeeded by Salas.

In the parliamentary elections of 2017, Bravo stood unsuccessfully as a candidate for deputy for District No. 8 in the Santiago Metropolitan Region. On March 11, 2018, Bravo was appointed by President Piñera as Undersecretary of National Assets. She held this post until November 2019 when she resigned after being accused of bribery over a plan to gain signatures for a new break-away party, Nueva Clase Media.
