= District 27 (Chamber of Deputies of Chile) =

Electoral district of the Chamber of Deputies of Chile

- Distrito 27
- Electoral District for the Chamber of Deputies
- Location of District 27 within Chile
- Region: Aysén
- Population: 103,158 (2017)
- Electorate: 98,558 (2021)
- Area: 106,797 km^{2} (2020)

Current Electoral District
- Created: 2017
- Seats: 3 (2017–present)
- Deputies: List: René Alinco (Ind); Miguel Ángel Calisto (Ind); Marcia Raphael (RN)

District 27 (Spanish: Distrito 27) is one of the 28 multi-member electoral districts of the Chamber of Deputies, the lower house of the National Congress, the national legislature of Chile. The district was created by the 2015 electoral reform and came into being at the following general election in 2017. It is conterminous with the region of Aysén. The district currently elects three of the 155 members of the Chamber of Deputies using the open party-list proportional representation electoral system. At the 2021 general election the district had 98,558 registered electors.

== Electoral system ==
District 27 currently elects three of the 155 members of the Chamber of Deputies using the open party-list proportional representation electoral system. Parties may form electoral pacts with each other to pool their votes and increase their chances of winning seats. However, the number of candidates nominated by an electoral pact may not exceed the maximum number of candidates that a single party may nominate. Seats are allocated using the D'Hondt method.

== Election results ==
=== Summary ===
Election	Apruebo Dignidad AD / FA			New Social Pact NPS / NM			Democratic Convergence CD			Chile Vamos Podemos / Vamos			Party of the People PDG		
Election	Votes	%	Seats	Votes	%	Seats	Votes	%	Seats	Votes	%	Seats	Votes	%	Seats
2021	5,666	14.96%	0	18,040	47.63%	2				10,838	28.62%	1	1,863	4.92%	0
2017				10,757	30.69%	1	10,689	30.50%	1	9,920	28.31%	1			

=== Detailed ===
==== 2021 ====
Results of the 2021 general election held on 21 November 2021:

Party		Pact	Party													Pact		
Party		Pact	Votes per commune										Total votes	%	Seats	Votes	%	Seats
Party		Pact	Aysén	Chile Chico	Cisnes	Coch- rane	Coy- haique	Guaite- cas	Lago Verde	O'Higg- ins	Río Ibáñez	Tortel	Total votes	%	Seats	Votes	%	Seats
Christian Democratic Party	PDC	New Social Pact	2,757	574	599	324	4,965	95	86	49	253	36	9,738	25.71%	1	18,040	47.63%	2
Party for Democracy	PPD	New Social Pact	815	202	199	73	3,249	27	49	6	164	14	4,798	12.67%	1	18,040	47.63%	2
Socialist Party of Chile	PS	New Social Pact	1,018	83	27	27	640	11	3	0	18	12	1,839	4.86%	0	18,040	47.63%	2
Radical Party of Chile	PR	New Social Pact	169	84	51	67	1,195	37	28	5	27	2	1,665	4.40%	0	18,040	47.63%	2
National Renewal	RN	Chile Podemos +	587	120	313	181	2,310	61	76	71	162	21	3,902	10.30%	1	10,838	28.62%	1
Independent Democratic Union	UDI	Chile Podemos +	536	165	176	211	2,142	82	76	28	180	12	3,608	9.53%	0	10,838	28.62%	1
Evópoli	EVO	Chile Podemos +	379	48	60	29	2,039	4	10	7	63	3	2,642	6.98%	0	10,838	28.62%	1
Democratic Independent Regionalist Party	PRI	Chile Podemos +	373	19	38	24	193	13	6	3	14	3	686	1.81%	0	10,838	28.62%	1
Communist Party of Chile	PC	Apruebo Dignidad	499	186	114	90	2,002	52	18	29	79	12	3,081	8.14%	0	5,666	14.96%	0
Democratic Revolution	RD	Apruebo Dignidad	343	105	142	137	1,688	16	14	47	70	23	2,585	6.83%	0	5,666	14.96%	0
Party of the People	PDG		450	72	107	31	1,078	29	26	5	52	13	1,863	4.92%	0	1,863	4.92%	0
Hansy Paola Chavez Gomez (Independent)	Ind		569	61	80	44	521	21	13	27	113	16	1,465	3.87%	0	1,465	3.87%	0
Valid votes			8,495	1,719	1,906	1,238	22,022	448	405	277	1,195	167	37,872	100.00%	3	37,872	100.00%	3
Blank votes			380	130	146	133	497	39	51	30	135	33	1,574	3.87%				
Rejected votes – other			265	85	63	59	605	12	20	18	55	15	1,197	2.95%				
Total polled			9,140	1,934	2,115	1,430	23,124	499	476	325	1,385	215	40,643	41.24%				
Registered electors			22,646	6,423	4,642	3,384	54,221	1,696	1,247	758	2,971	570	98,558					
Turnout			40.36%	30.11%	45.56%	42.26%	42.65%	29.42%	38.17%	42.88%	46.62%	37.72%	41.24%					

The following candidates were elected: René Alinco (PPD), 4,798 votes; Miguel Ángel Calisto (PDC), 9,738 votes; and Marcia Raphael (RN), 3,902 votes.

==== 2017 ====
Results of the 2017 general election held on 19 November 2017:

Party		Pact	Party													Pact		
Party		Pact	Votes per commune										Total votes	%	Seats	Votes	%	Seats
Party		Pact	Aysén	Chile Chico	Cisnes	Coch- rane	Coy- haique	Guaite- cas	Lago Verde	O'Higg- ins	Río Ibáñez	Tortel	Total votes	%	Seats	Votes	%	Seats
Party for Democracy	PPD	Nueva Mayoría	641	76	124	38	2,073	27	14	8	116	4	3,121	8.91%	1	10,757	30.69%	1
Socialist Party of Chile	PS	Nueva Mayoría	1,681	80	92	19	1,100	61	21	5	45	2	3,106	8.86%	0	10,757	30.69%	1
Social Democrat Radical Party	PRSD	Nueva Mayoría	352	367	74	425	1,639	18	23	32	117	51	3,098	8.84%	0	10,757	30.69%	1
Communist Party of Chile	PC	Nueva Mayoría	326	74	31	26	915	6	7	2	20	25	1,432	4.09%	0	10,757	30.69%	1
Christian Democratic Party	PDC	Democratic Convergence	2,277	581	384	161	6,628	115	73	37	406	27	10,689	30.50%	1	10,689	30.50%	1
National Renewal	RN	Chile Vamos	864	96	180	219	2,111	153	69	36	172	25	3,925	11.20%	1	9,920	28.31%	1
Independent Democratic Union	UDI	Chile Vamos	610	310	59	141	2,265	27	99	45	194	7	3,757	10.72%	0	9,920	28.31%	1
Evópoli	EVO	Chile Vamos	367	9	368	25	651	15	11	3	19	3	1,471	4.20%	0	9,920	28.31%	1
Independent Regionalist Party	PRI	Chile Vamos	103	51	17	13	555	6	6	3	12	1	767	2.19%	0	9,920	28.31%	1
Cecilio Aguilar Galindo (Independent)	Ind		292	66	121	110	1,055	14	54	28	96	31	1,867	5.33%	0	1,867	5.33%	0
Todos	TODOS	Sumemos	113	27	23	13	334	4	5	3	12	1	535	1.53%	0	1,041	2.97%	0
Citizens	CIU	Sumemos	252	9	22	12	182	9	3	3	11	3	506	1.44%	0	1,041	2.97%	0
Patagonian Regional Democracy	DRP	Green Regionalist Coalition	170	52	42	21	424	25	11	6	16	4	771	2.20%	0	771	2.20%	0
Valid votes			8,048	1,798	1,537	1,223	19,932	480	396	211	1,236	184	35,045	100.00%	3	35,045	100.00%	3
Blank votes			462	219	174	121	698	69	44	23	175	35	2,020	5.31%				
Rejected votes – other			255	50	52	39	467	31	13	3	50	19	979	2.57%				
Total polled			8,765	2,067	1,763	1,383	21,097	580	453	237	1,461	238	38,044	40.01%				
Registered electors			21,890	6,209	4,253	3,267	52,542	1,590	1,196	699	2,886	546	95,078					
Turnout			40.04%	33.29%	41.45%	42.33%	40.15%	36.48%	37.88%	33.91%	50.62%	43.59%	40.01%					

The following candidates were elected: René Alinco (PPD), 3,121 votes; Miguel Ángel Calisto (PDC), 8,822 votes; and Aracely Leuquén (RN), 3,925 votes.
