= Jorge Soria Macchiavello =

Chilean politician

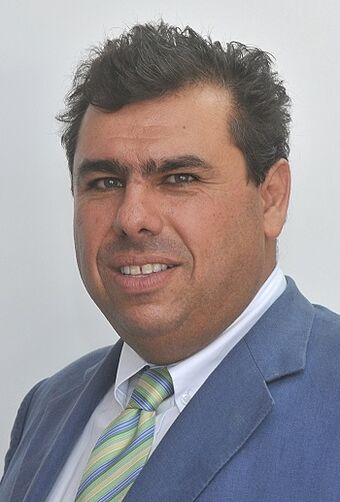

Tarapacá Regional Counseller for Iquique
- In office 11 March 2014 – 14 December 2015
- President: Michelle Bachelet
- Succeeded by: Lautaro Lobos

Member of the Chamber of Deputies
- In office 11 March 1994 – 11 March 2002
- Preceded by: Vladislav Kuzmicic
- Succeeded by: Fulvio Rossi
- Constituency: 2nd District (Alto Hospicio, Camiña, Colchane, Huara, Iquique, Pica and Pozo Almonte)

Personal details
- Born: 3 March 1969 (age 56) Iquique, Chile
- Party: Party for Democracy (1989–1999); Regionalist Action Party of Chile (2003–2006); Fuerza País (2007–2010); Fuerza del Norte (2011–2014)
- Parent(s): Jorge Soria; María Inés Macchiavello
- Relatives: Mauricio Soria (brother)
- Occupation: Politician

Jorge Alfredo Alejandro Soria Macchiavello (born 3 March 1969) is a Chilean politician and entrepreneur who served as deputy.

He began his public career at a young age, becoming a national deputy at just 24, and later served as a regional councilor. Over the years, he has been involved with various political movements, including the Party for Democracy (PPD), Fuerza País, and Fuerza del Norte.

Beyond politics, he has worked as an airline agent and small business owner, maintaining strong ties to his community and the Tarapacá Region.

== Biography ==
He is the son of political parents: Jorge Soria Quiroga, mayor of Iquique since 2012 and previously during several terms, as well as, Senator; and María Inés Macchiavello, councilor for Alto Hospicio since 2012 and previously for Iquique (2008–2012).

His brother is Mauricio Soria, councilor for Iquique since 2012 and mayor of the same commune since 2016.

== Political career ==
He completed his primary education at School No. B1 in Mulchén and at Don Bosco School in Iquique, finishing at the latter institution. After completing his schooling, he obtained a degree as an administrative technician.

He began his political activities by joining the Party for Democracy (PPD) from its foundation by his father in Iquique in 1987, serving on its political committee. In the private sector, he worked as an Airline Agent in his hometown. He has also worked as a small entrepreneur.

In 1993, at the age of 24, he was elected Deputy for the First Region, District No. 2 (Iquique, Huara, Camiña, Colchane, Pica and Pozo Almonte) for the 1994–1998 term. During his time in office, he was part of the Committees on Foreign Affairs, Inter-Parliamentary Affairs and Latin American Integration, and on Housing and Urban Development. He was also a member of the Special Legislative Committee on the Development Plan for Arica and Parinacota, as well as the Investigative Committee on Customs Irregularities.

In December 1997, he was re-elected for the following term, from 1998 to 2002. He joined the Committee on Human Rights, Nationality, and Citizenship. He resigned from the PPD in 1999 and didn't run for another term.

In 2005, as a member of the Regionalist Action Party created by his father, he served as a Regional Councilor (CORE) representing the Iquique Province until 2009. In 2007, he participated in the formation of a political group called Fuerza País (Country Force), which he led as president.

Representing the Fuerza del Norte (Northern Force) party, he ran in the first direct elections for regional councilors in 2013, winning the highest number of votes in the Province of Iquique. He resigned from that position in December 2015 and was replaced by Lautaro Lobos.
