= René Alinco =

Chilean politician

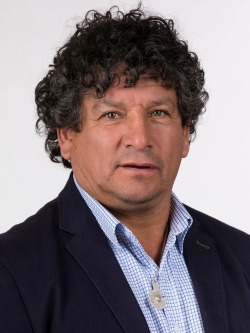
- Official portrait (2018)

Member of the Chamber of Deputies
- Incumbent
- Assumed office 11 March 2018
- Preceded by: District created
- Constituency: District 27
- In office 11 March 2006 – 11 March 2014
- Preceded by: Leopoldo Sánchez Grunert
- Succeeded by: Iván Fuentes
- Constituency: 59th District

Personal details
- Born: 2 June 1958 (age 67) Coyhaique, Chile
- Other political affiliations: Communist Party (1986–1990); Party for Democracy (1992–2010); Radical Social Democratic Party (2012–2013)
- Children: Two
- Parent(s): Osvaldo Alinco; Flor Bustos
- Occupation: Politician

René Osvaldo Alinco Bustos (born 2 June 1958) is a Chilean politician and former worker who currently serves as a parliamentarian.

== Biography ==
He was born on 2 June 1958. His parents were Osvaldo Alinco, a construction worker and Communist councillor during the government of Salvador Allende, and Flor Bustos, a laundress. He married María Erita Vera Vera on 2 January 1989, and they have five children.

Alinco studied at Escuela D-21 and at Liceo Juan Gómez Millas in Coyhaique.

Coming from a working-class family, he began working at an early age in metallurgy and construction. Between 1980 and 1985, he lived in Argentina, where he worked in oil and mining facilities located in the provinces of Santa Cruz and Chubut.

After 2014, he returned to work in metallurgy and construction as a site supervisor and master welder.

== Political career ==
During the years he lived in Argentina, he participated in the Chilean solidarity movement led by Argentine Radical Civic Union (UCR) parliamentarian Hipólito Solari.

After returning to Chile, he became active as a trade union leader. He served as president of the Construction Workers’ Union; was a leader within the National Confederation of Construction Workers; acted as youth officer and organizer of the Regional Workers’ Command of the Aysén Region; served as national trade union coordinator; and between 1985 and 1998 was a leader of the Coyhaique Construction Workers’ Union, one of the oldest unions in the region.

In 1987, he participated as a delegate from the Aysén Region in the Constituent Congress of the Central Unitary Workers’ Union (CUT), held in Talca, becoming the main promoter of this organization in the region.

He also served as secretary of the Regional Peasant Commission of the Aysén Region.

In the 1993 parliamentary elections, he ran as a candidate for the Chamber of Deputies of Chile representing the Communist Party of Chile in the Aysén del General Carlos Ibáñez del Campo Region, but was not elected.

Between 1996 and 2005, he served as a councillor of the Municipality of Coyhaique, first as an independent and later as a member of the Party for Democracy (PPD). On 29 November 2010, he resigned from his membership in that party.

On 6 December 2010, he officially registered with the Progressive Party, a political party led by Marco Enríquez-Ominami.

In the November 2013 parliamentary elections, he again ran as a candidate for the Chamber of Deputies for District No. 59, representing the Independent Regionalist Party (PRI), but was not elected.

In August 2021, he ran for election in the 27th District, which includes the communes of Aisén, Chile Chico, Cisnes, Cochrane, Coyhaique, Guaitecas, Lago Verde, O'Higgins, Río Ibáñez, and Tortel, in the Aysén Region, for the 2022–2026 term. In November, he was elected as an independent candidate within the New Social Pact coalition, running on a PPD list, obtaining 4,798 votes, corresponding to 12.67% of the valid votes cast.
