= Miguel Ángel Calisto =

Chilean politician (born 1985)

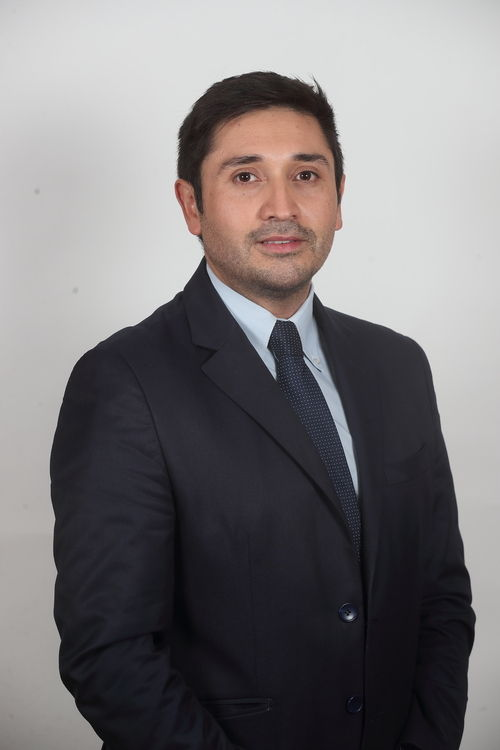

Member of the Senate
- Incumbent
- Assumed office 11 March 2026

Member of the Chamber of Deputies
- Incumbent
- Assumed office 11 March 2018
- Preceded by: Creation of the District
- Constituency: District 27

Personal details
- Born: 19 July 1985 (age 41) Coyhaique, Chile
- Party: Christian Democratic Party (1999–2022); Independent Regionalist Party (2007–2016); Democrats (2023–2025)
- Education: Austral University of Chile (LL.B); University of Barcelona (LL.M)
- Occupation: Politician
- Profession: Lawyer

Miguel Ángel Calisto Águila (born 19 July 1985) is a Chilean politician.

== Early life and education ==
Calisto was born on 19 July 1985 in Coyhaique. He is the father of one son, Miguel Adolfo.

He completed his primary education between 1991 and 1999 at Colegio San José Obrero Hermanas Siervas de San José in Coyhaique. He later attended Colegio San Felipe Siervos de Santa María Benicio in the same city, where he completed his secondary education between 2000 and 2003.

In 2004, he moved to Valdivia to study journalism at the Austral University of Chile, obtaining his degree in 2009.

== Professional career ==
Between January and February 2006, Calisto worked as a communications and news editor at the Regional Office of the National Council for the Control of Narcotics (CONACE) in the Aysén Region.

In January and July 2008, he participated in studies on communication strategies for the municipal election campaign in Coyhaique.

From March 2008, he served as a legislative adviser to former senator Patricio Walker.

== Political career ==
During his school years, Calisto served as class president and was the first president of the student council at Colegio San Felipe Siervos de Santa María Benicio.

He joined the Christian Democratic Party (PDC) at the age of 14, inspired by former senator Adolfo Zaldívar. In December 2007, following Zaldívar’s expulsion from the party and the creation of the Independent Regionalist Party (PRI), Calisto joined that organization. He later rejoined the PDC.

From the 2010s onward, he held various public positions at the regional level. Between March 2014 and March 2018, he served as a Regional Councillor (CORE) of the Aysén Region for the province of Coyhaique, elected on the PRI ticket with 3,528 votes (19.19%). During this period, he served as president of the Regional Council between March 2014 and March 2016.

He also served as regional director of the National Board of School Assistance and Scholarships (JUNAEB) in the Aysén Region between October 2016 and June 2017.

In the 2017 Chilean general election, Calisto was elected to the Chamber of Deputies for the 27th District of the Aysén Region as a candidate of the Christian Democratic Party within the Convergencia Democrática list. He obtained 8,822 votes, representing 25.17% of the valid votes cast.

In the 2021 Chilean general election, he ran for re-election in the same district under the Nuevo Pacto Social coalition and was re-elected with the highest vote share, receiving 9,738 votes (25.71%).

On 13 November 2022, after 18 years of membership, he resigned from the Christian Democratic Party, declaring himself in a period of political reflection. In January 2023, he joined the Demócrats party.

In August 2025, he registered his candidacy for the Senate of Chile for the Aysén Region as an independent candidate, with the support of the Social Green Regionalist Federation (FRVS).
