= Marta Isasi =

Chilean politician

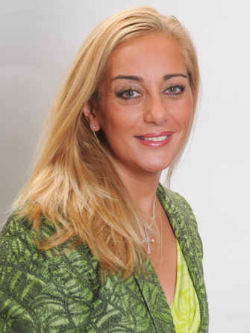

Member of the Chamber of Deputies
- In office 11 March 2006 – 11 March 2014
- Preceded by: Néstor Jofré
- Succeeded by: Renzo Trisotti
- Constituency: 2nd District

Personal details
- Born: 15 January 1966 (age 60) Santiago, Chile
- Other party: Regionalist Action Party of Chile (2003–2007); Unión Demócrata Independiente (2009–2010); Independent Regionalist Party (2010–2012)
- Children: Three
- Occupation: Politician

Marta Eliana Isasi Barbieri (born 15 January 1966) is a Chilean politician who served as Deputy of the Republic of Chile.

== Early life and family ==
Isasi was born on 15 January 1966. She is divorced and the mother of three daughters: Divna Snezana Gospodja, Ljubinka, and Diannella.

She completed her studies at Saint Gabriel’s English School and at Liceo Nº 7 of Providencia in Santiago. She qualified as an engineer in Business Administration and, prior to assuming office as deputy, served as Regional Agent of the Housing Corporation of the Chilean Chamber of Construction.

== Political career ==
In the parliamentary elections of 11 December 2005, she ran as a candidate for deputy in District No. 2 representing the Regionalist Action Party of Chile (PAR) within the Independent Force pact, and was elected with 24,350 votes (26.66% of the valid votes cast).

Following the dissolution of the Regionalist Action Party, she ran for re-election in 2009 as an independent candidate in List B, “Coalition for Change”, obtaining the highest vote in the district with 28,884 votes (31.02% of the valid votes cast).

In the parliamentary elections held on 17 November 2013, she sought re-election for a third term in District No. 2, this time as an independent candidate outside any electoral pact, but lost her seat after obtaining 10,462 votes (12.16% of the valid votes cast).
