= Common Sense (political party) =

Common Sense Sentido Común
- Abbreviation: SC
- President: Rodrigo Caramori Donoso
- Secretary: Víctor Manuel Araya Anchia
- Founded: 1 October 2022
- Legalized: 12 October 2023
- Dissolved: 17 May 2024
- Preceded by: Democratic Independent Regionalist Party
- Ideology: Regionalism; Reformism; Social market economy
- Political position: Centre to centre-right
- Colours: Turquoise; Purple
- Slogan: "Is wanting the best for Chile" (Spanish: "Es querer lo mejor para Chile")

Common Sense (Spanish: Sentido Común; SC) was a Chilean political party founded in 2022 by former militants of the Democratic Independent Regionalist Party, Christian Democratic Party and former members of the Chile Vamos coalition. It was officially recognized by the Electoral Service of Chile (Servel) on 12 October 2023.

One of the founders of the party was the lawyer Rodrigo Logan, who served as a member of the Constitutional Convention of Chile between 2021 and 2022.

The party was dissolved by the Chilean Electoral Service on 17 May 2024 after detecting errors and irregularities in the constitution of its internal bodies.

== See also ==
- List of political parties in Chile
