= Antonio Horvath =

Chilean politician

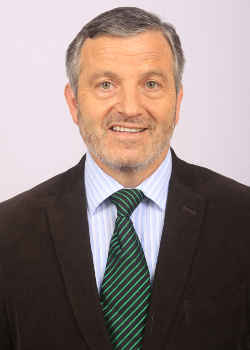

Member of the Senate of Chile
- In office 11 March 1994 – 11 March 2018
- Preceded by: Hugo Ortíz de Filippi
- Succeeded by: District dissolved
- Constituency: 18th Circumscription

Member of the Chamber of Deputies
- In office 11 March 1990 – 11 March 1994
- Preceded by: Creation of the district
- Succeeded by: Valentín Solís
- Constituency: 59th District

Personal details
- Born: 3 January 1950 Santiago, Chile
- Died: 23 May 2018 (aged 68) Santiago, Chile
- Party: National Renewal (RN) (2003–2013)
- Children: Five
- Education: University of Chile
- Occupation: Politician
- Profession: Civil Engineer

Antonio Carlos Horvath Kiss (3 January 1950 – 23 May 2018) was a Chilean politician who served as a Deputy from 1990 to 1994, and as a Senator from 1994 to 2018.

Horvath was a lifetime director of the Padre Antonio Ronchi Foundation, a non-profit religious organization created to preserve the work of the Italian Catholic priest Antonio Ronchi, who served isolated communities in the Aysén Region. He served as vice president of the foundation between 2002 and 2004.

From 1996 onward, he collaborated as a columnist for the newspaper Estrategia and for several regional newspapers, and was a founding member of the regionalist group Los Federales. He authored publications and delivered lectures on environmental issues, engineering, and territorial development.

== Early life and education ==
Horvath was born in Santiago on 3 January 1950. He was the son of Antonio Horvath Sumi and Adele Kiss Farkas. He was married and had five children.

He completed his primary education at the Sankt Thomas Morus German School in Santiago and his secondary education at the Sagrados Corazones School of Alameda, graduating in 1967. After completing his schooling, he entered the University of Chile, where he pursued parallel studies in Fine Arts between 1969 and 1973, and Civil Engineering at the Faculty of Physical and Mathematical Sciences, graduating in 1975 with a thesis titled Engineering Problems with Ice, Snow and Frost.

In 1984, he completed postgraduate studies in Civil and Environmental Engineering, earning a Master of Science in Engineering degree from Purdue University in the United States.

== Professional career ==
Between 1974 and 1976, Horvath worked as an engineer in the Studies Department of the Directorate of Roads. From 1976 until 1983, he served as Regional Director of Roads in the Aysén Region, where he was responsible for the Southern Longitudinal Highway project and established his residence in the region.

In 1984, he participated in a Ministry of Planning (MIDEPLAN) task force responsible for developing a national environmental assessment methodology. From that year until 1989, he collaborated on the Chile Futuro project. Between 1986 and 1989, he served as Regional Secretary of the Ministry of Public Works in Aysén and presided over the region’s Technical and Ecological Commission.

In 1989, he worked at the National Corporation for Regionalization and Decentralization of Chile (CONAREDE). The following year, he founded the Corporation for the Development of the Austral Zone (COAUSTRAL), an organization focused on promoting development projects and programs for southern Chile.

He was a co-founder of the Corporation for the Development of the Austral Zone and participated in the Technical Advisory Committee of the Sustainable Development Council, as well as in the Global Environmental Citizenship Program of the United Nations Environment Programme (UNEP).

== Political career ==
In March 2003, Horvath joined National Renewal (RN), becoming vice president of the party that same year.

On 19 December 2013, he resigned from RN and, together with senators Carlos Cantero and Carlos Bianchi, formed the political movement Regional Democracy.

Horvath died on 23 May 2018 in Santiago.

== Awards ==
In 2000, he received the Distinguished Engineering Alumni Award from Purdue University in the United States.
