= Aracely Leuquén Uribe =

Chilean politician

Aracely Leuquén
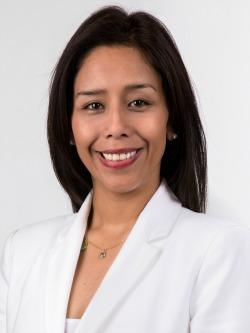
- Official portrait, 2018

Member of the Chamber of Deputies
- In office 11 March 2018 – 11 March 2022
- Succeeded by: Marcia Raphael
- Constituency: District 27

Member of the Council of Coyhaique
- In office 6 December 2008 – 6 December 2016

Personal details
- Born: Aracely Andrea Leuquén Uribe; 24 November 1980 (age 45) Coyhaique, Chile
- Party: National Renewal (1998–present)
- Other political affiliations: Republican Action
- Education: Instituto Nacional de Capacitación Profesional
- Occupation: Politician

Aracely Andrea Leuquén Uribe (born 24 November 1980) is a Chilean politician. She is a member of the Chamber of Deputies of Chile from the National Renewal Party. A traditionalist conservative, she opposes same-sex marriage and abortion.

When she took office on March 11, 2018, she became one of the first two Mapuche women elected to the Chilean Congress, together with her Socialist counterpart Emilia Nuyado. She did not run for re-election in 2021.

== Early life and education ==
Leuquén was born on November 24, 1980, in Coyhaique, Chile. She is the daughter of Aurelio Leuquén Andrade, a social leader of the Christian Democratic Party and former city councilor of Coyhaique, and María Gloria Uribe Mayorga.

Leuquén completed her primary and secondary education at Liceo Josefina Aguirre Montenegro in Coyhaique, graduating in 2000.

She pursued higher education at INACAP, where she earned a degree as a Social Work Assistant in July 2005.

== Professional career ==
Leuquén has professional experience in both the public and private sectors. She served as a public official at the National Women's Service (SERNAM) during 2013 and 2014 in the Aysén Region.

== Political career ==
In 1998, Leuquén joined the National Renewal party. She later served as the party’s regional president for two consecutive terms.

In the 2008 municipal elections, she was elected city councilor of Coyhaique for the 2008–2012 term, obtaining 2,538 votes, equivalent to 13.10% of the total valid votes.

In 2012, she was re-elected as city councilor of Coyhaique with 1,287 votes, equivalent to 7.24% of the total valid votes, serving until 2016.

In the parliamentary elections of November 2017, Leuquén was elected to the Chamber of Deputies of Chile representing the 27th electoral district of the Aysén Region on the Chile Vamos list for National Renewal. She served during the 2018–2022 legislative term after obtaining 3,925 votes, equivalent to 11.20% of the total valid votes.
