= Rodrigo Logan =

Chilean politician (born 1980)

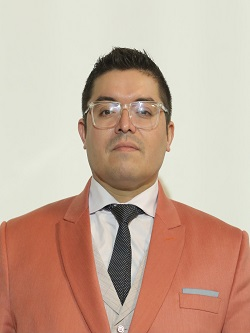

Member of the Constitutional Convention
- In office 4 July 2021 – 4 July 2022
- Constituency: District 9

Personal details
- Born: 1 February 1980 (age 46) Santiago, Chile
- Party: Independent (2016–2020); Party of the People (2021–2022); Common Sense (2022–)
- Parent(s): Enzo Logan; Margarita Soto
- Education: University of Chile (LL.B)
- Occupation: Politician
- Profession: Lawyer

Rodrigo Logan Soto (born 1 February 1980) is a Chilean politician and lawyer.

== Biography ==
Born in Quinta Normal in 1980, Rodrigo is the son of the shoe salesman Enzo Logan and Margarita Soto, an employee of La Polar. he grew up in that commune until he was five when his parents achieved to acquire ―through a subsidy― a house in Recoleta, a commune from which he hasn't moved.

His stay at the school in Recoleta was brief because in fifth grade his parents decided to enroll him at the José Victorino Lastarria Lycee. There, he worked to achieve his goal of studying law at the University of Chile, which he reached in 1998 after a failed attempt in 1997.

In 2016, Logan run for conusilmen of Recoleta and was supported by the centre-rightist party Renovación Nacional.

On 16 May 2021, he was elected as a constituent for the Chilean Constitutional Convention representing his district (N°9) which includes communes like Recoleta and Quinta Normal. Days later, it was reported by CNN Chile that Logan was the most voted constituent of the ninth district.

On 4 July 2021, he obtained five votes in the career for being the Constitutional Convention's vice president. One was Bessy Gallardo's.
