= New Middle Class =

Political party in Chile

New Middle Class Nueva Clase Media
- Leader: Eduardo Salas; Alejandra Bravo Hidalgo
- President: Eduardo Salas Cerda
- Secretary: Sebastián Lafaurie Rivera
- Founded: 20 July 2019
- Legalised: 13 Abril 2020
- Dissolved: 22 October 2020
- Split from: Democratic Independent Regionalist Party
- Headquarters: Calle Gran Avenida 1005, Paine, Chile
- Membership (2020): 1751
- Ideology: Regionalism; Reformism
- Political position: Centre
- Colors: Blue and Red
- Chamber of Deputies: 0 / 120
- Senate: 0 / 38

New Middle Class (Spanish: Nueva Clase Media, NCM) was a centrist Chilean political party. It was founded in 2019 by former militants of the Democratic Independent Regionalist Party (PRI) led by its former president, Eduardo Cerda, and Alejandra Bravo Hidalgo.
