= Hugo Ortiz de Filippi =

Chilean politician (born 1937)

Hugo Ortíz de Filippi
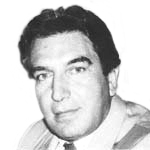

Member of the Senate of Chile
- In office 11 March 1990 – 11 March 1994
- Preceded by: District created
- Succeeded by: Antonio Horvath

Personal details
- Born: 24 June 1937 (age 89) Santiago, Chile
- Party: Independent Regionalist Party (PRI)
- Other political affiliations: Radical Party (PR); National Party (PN); National Renewal (RN)
- Spouse: Ada Gajardo (†2011)
- Children: Two
- Education: University of Chile (LL.B)
- Occupation: Politician
- Profession: Lawyer

Hugo Ortíz de Filippi (born 24 July 1937) is a Chilean politician who served as senator.

== Biography ==
He was born in Santiago on 24 June 1937. He is the son of María Teresa De Filippi and Miguel Ángel Ortiz Vásquez. He has two children.

He completed his primary and secondary education at Liceo Manuel Barros Borgoño. In the early 1960s, he entered the Faculty of Law of the University of Chile, obtaining a degree in Legal and Social Sciences with the thesis "Analysis of the Legal-Labor Regime of Seasonal Workers". He was admitted to the bar before the Supreme Court of Justice on 13 October 1970.

He has practiced law independently.

== Political career ==
His political activities began when he assumed leadership of the Student Council, a position he held for five years. He was later elected as Chile's representative to the 8th World Congress of University Students, held in Prague, Czechoslovakia.

In 1969, he was elected national president of the Youth of the National Party. That same year, he ran as a candidate for the presidency of the Federation of Students of the University of Chile, being elected as a board member.

In 1971, he formally joined the National Party, where he became a member of its Political Commission. As a party representative, he participated in the presidential campaign of Jorge Alessandri Rodríguez.

Between 1970 and 1973, he resided in the Aysén Province, where he carried out extensive legal work in defense of farmers, merchants, and transport workers. In October 1972, he supported the truck drivers' strike in that region during the government of Salvador Allende.

In the 1973 parliamentary elections, he ran as a candidate for Deputy for Aysén for the 1973–1977 term but was not elected.

In 1998, he was appointed associate judge – abogado integrante – of the Santiago Court of Appeals. Three years later, in 2001, he assumed the legal defense of executives of Aero Continente.

In 2005, he resigned from Renovación Nacional. In the 2013 elections, he was elected Regional Councillor of the Los Ríos Region, representing the Independent Democratic Union. He held the position until 11 March 2018 and served as president of the Regional Council between 11 March 2015 and 17 March 2016. He also served as president of the Infrastructure Commission and was a member of the Finance, Infrastructure, and Internal Affairs commissions.

On 17 November 2018, he was elected president of the Independent Regionalist Party. He later resigned from that position upon being appointed Regional Ministerial Secretary of Labor and Social Security for the Los Ríos Region by President Sebastián Piñera on 11 December 2019.
