= Jorge Soria =

Chilean politician

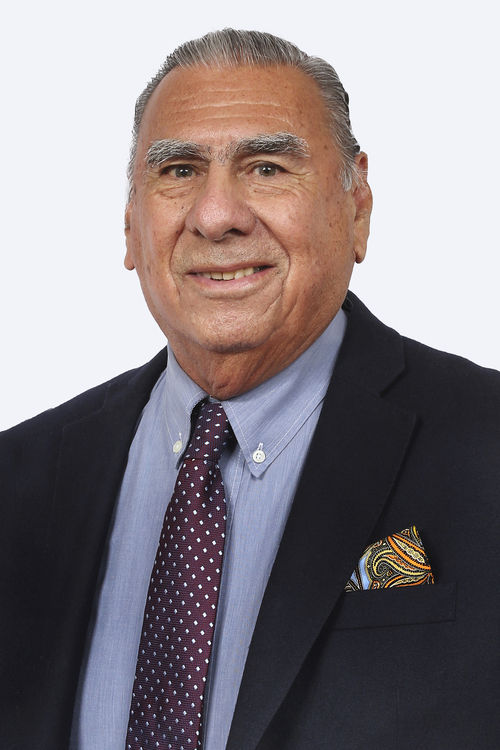

Member of the Senate of Chile
- In office 11 March 2018 – 11 March 2026
- Preceded by: District created
- Constituency: 2nd Circumscription (Tarapacá Region)

Mayor of Iquique
- In office 26 September 2012 – 7 October 2016
- Preceded by: Myrta Dubost
- Succeeded by: Mauricio Soria
- In office 26 September 1992 – 10 October 2007
- Preceded by: Myrta Dubost
- Succeeded by: Myrta Dubost
- In office 1964 – 11 September 1973
- Preceded by: Samuel Astorga
- Succeeded by: Javier Provoste Vidal

Personal details
- Born: 1 November 1936 (age 89) Iquique, Chile
- Party: Socialist Party (1950−1987); Party for Democracy (1987−1989 / 2022–); Communist Party (1992); Party for Democracy (1996–1999); Regionalist Action Party (2003−2006); Fuerza País (2007–2010); Fuerza del Norte (2011–2014); MAS Region (2014–2015); Por La Integración Regional (2016–2017); Independent (2017–2023)
- Spouse: María Inés Macchiavello
- Children: Two: Jorge and Mauricio
- Occupation: Politician

Jorge Alejandro Soria Quiroga (born 1 November 1936) is a Chilean politician who currently serves as a member of the Senate of his country.

Soria Quiroga is a Chilean public figure with a long trajectory in local and national politics, particularly linked to the city of Iquique and the Tarapacá Region. With over sixty years of public service, he began his political career at a young age and became one of the youngest mayors in Chile in 1964. Throughout his career, he has served multiple terms as mayor, promoting urban development projects and a regional vision focused on modernization and citizen engagement.

In 2018, he was elected to the Senate of Chile, representing the Tarapacá Region. His work in the legislature has included initiatives related to port development, regional integration with neighboring countries, infrastructure for remote areas, and proposals aimed at strengthening regional autonomy in northern Chile.

== Political career ==
=== Beginnings and First Mayoral Term (1964–1973) ===
Soria began his political career at a young age, showing early leadership as president of the Student Council at the Liceo de Hombres de Iquique. In 1963, he was elected as a municipal councilor (regidor), and at just 26 years old, he became mayor of Iquique on 24 February 1964, following the resignation of his predecessor. He quickly stood out as one of Chile's youngest mayors.

During this first term, Soria focused on the urban development of Iquique, aiming to modernize the city, strengthen its regional identity, and position it as a strategic hub in northern Chile. His energetic and hands-on leadership style earned him a strong public presence. His tenure was interrupted by the 1973 military coup, when he was removed from office by the new regime.

=== Exile and Return (1973–1989) ===
Following the coup, Soria was detained by the military government and later banished to Mulchén, a town in southern Chile. He spent years under surveillance and was officially recognized as a political prisoner by the Valech Commission (National Commission on Political Imprisonment and Torture).

In 1980, he returned to Iquique and gradually resumed his ties with the local community. As Chile moved toward democratization, Soria became a regional voice advocating for a return to democracy and regional autonomy.

=== Second and Third Mayoral Terms ===
With the return to democracy, Soria was re-elected mayor of Iquique in 1992, in the first free municipal elections in nearly two decades. He was re-elected in 1996, 2000, and 2004, becoming one of the longest-serving mayors in Chile.

This period saw significant urban transformation under his leadership. Major public works included the renovation of the Estadio Tierra de Campeones, the development of Playa Brava Park (also known as Las Américas Park), and upgrades to the city’s coastal infrastructure.

After a five-year hiatus, Soria returned as mayor in the 2012 Chilean municipal election, once again elected by popular vote. He served until 2016, when he stepped down to run for national office.

=== Period as Senator (2018–2026) ===
On 7 October 2016, Jorge Soria resigned from the mayoralty to run for the Senate representing the newly created Tarapacá constituency.

He was elected in the 2017 parliamentary elections and took office on 11 March 2018, as an independent supported by the Party for Democracy (PPD), his former party in the 90s.

As a senator, Soria has actively participated in several key Senate committees, including: Public Works, Mining and Energy, Fisheries and Aquaculture, Transport and Telecommunications, Housing and Urban Development, Special Committee on Extreme Zones and Special Territories.

His legislative agenda also has emphasized port development, regional integration with neighboring countries, infrastructure for remote zones, and greater regional autonomy, especially for northern Chile.

In 2022, he returned to the PPD aged 86.
