= Sergio Micco =

Chilean politician

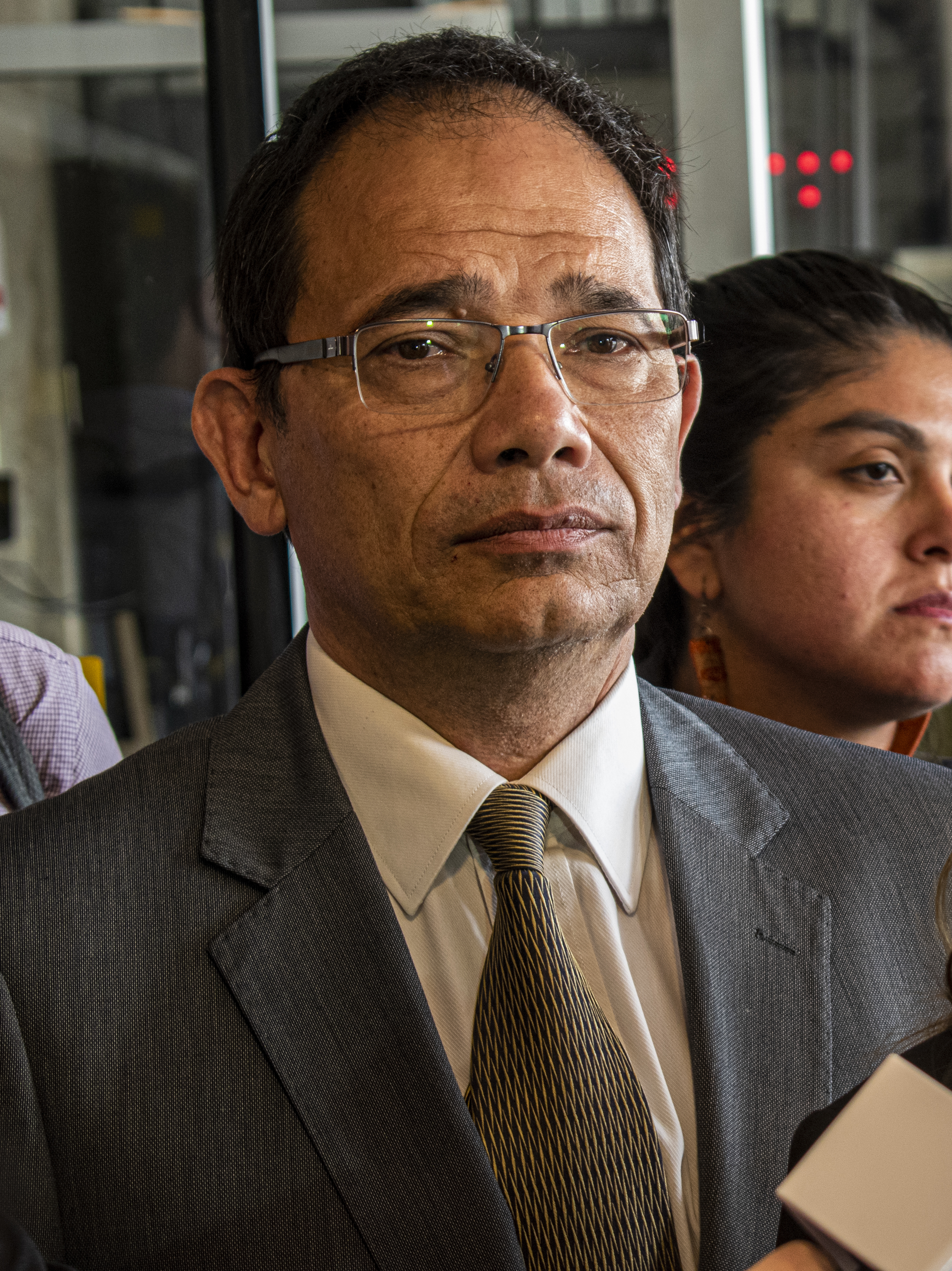

Head of the National Institute of Human Rights of Chile
- In office 29 July 2019 – 18 July 2022
- Preceded by: Consuelo Contreras Largo
- Succeeded by: Consuelo Contreras Largo

Personal details
- Born: 12 November 1963 (age 62) Concepción, Chile
- Party: Christian Democratic Party; Amarillos por Chile
- Parent(s): Sergio Micco; Eva Aguayo
- Relatives: Alejandro Micco
- Education: University of Concepción (LL.B); Pontifical Catholic University of Chile (MA); University of Chile (Ph.D)
- Occupation: Politician
- Profession: Lawyer

Sergio Aurelio Micco Aguayo (born 12 November 1963) is a Chilean politician and public administrator who served as a head of the National Institute of Human Rights of Chile between 2019 and 2022.
