= Regionalist Action Party of Chile =

Regionalist Action Party of Chile Partido de Acción Regionalista de Chile
- Founded: 18 December 2003
- Dissolved: 4 July 2006
- Merged into: Independent Regionalist Party
- Headquarters: Serrano 746, Iquique
- Ideology: Regionalism

Website
- http://regiones.ya.st/

Regionalist Action Party of Chile (in Spanish: Partido de Acción Regionalista de Chile), was a political party in Chile. Operated in only the regions I, II and III in the northern parts of the country. In the 2004 municipal elections the party presented 13 candidates and got 1,199 votes (0.02% of votes nationwide). The bulk of the votes came from the 2nd District of Region I, were the party got 600 votes. In the 2005 elections, the 2nd District of Region I elected PAR member Marta Isasi as deputy, the only party member elected to Congress.

The leader of the party was the former socialist Jorge Soria, the former mayor of Iquique, who surprised many in the 2005–06 Chilean presidential election by supporting Sebastián Piñera, the center-right candidate. However, Soria has been suspended from his post because of an investigation of alleged embezzlement of municipal funds. Without him, the party collapsed and its only representative in the Chamber of Deputies, Marta Isasi, joined the National Renewal caucus, although she is still listed as belonging to the PAR.

On 4 July 2006 the PAR merged with the National Alliance of Independents to form the Regionalist Party of Independents.
