= Democratic Independent Regionalist Party =

Chilean political party

Democratic Independent Regionalist Party Partido Regionalista Independiente Demócrata
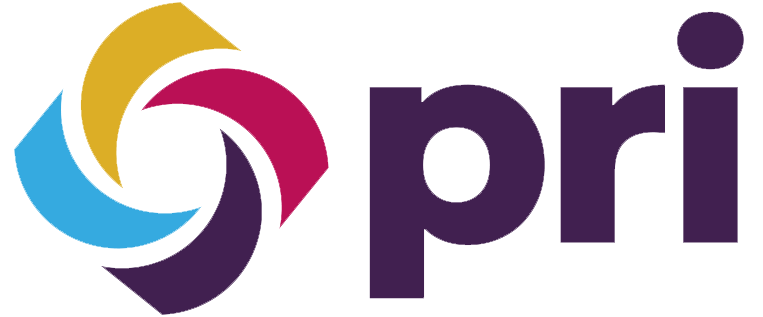
- President: Rodrigo Caramori
- Founded: 20 February 2018
- Dissolved: 3 February 2022
- Merger of: Independent Regionalist Party and Patagonian Regional Democracy
- Succeeded by: Common Sense
- Headquarters: Morandé 322, of 308; Santiago
- Membership (2020): 23,567
- Ideology: Regionalism; Christian humanism Reformism; Social conservatism Anti-communism
- Political position: Centre to centre-right
- National affiliation: Chile Vamos
- Colours: Purple, Sky blue, Yellow and Pink
- Senate: 0 / 50
- Chamber of Deputies: 0 / 155
- Regional Councillors: 5 / 278
- Mayors: 4 / 345
- Communal Councillors: 47 / 2,130

Website
- www.pridemocrata.cl

Democratic Independent Regionalist Party (Spanish: Partido Regionalista Independiente Demócrata, PRI) was a Chilean regionalist political party. It was formed by the merger of the Independent Regionalist Party (PRI) and the Patagonian Regional Democracy (DRP).

The party was part of the centre-right coalition Chile Vamos and supported the government of President Sebastián Piñera.

In 2019 the PRI suffered an internal dispute after Hugo Ortiz de Filippi defeated Eduardo Salas in the elections. After this, a group of militants left the party to form another called New Middle Class.

The party lost official registration after failing to get a minimum percentage of the vote in the 2021 elections.

== Presidential candidates ==
The following is a list of the presidential candidates supported by the Democratic Independent Regionalist Party. (Information gathered from the Archive of Chilean Elections).

- 2021: Sebastián Sichel (lost)

== Electoral history ==
=== Congress election ===
Election year	Chamber of Deputies			Senate			Status
Election year	# Votes	% Votes	Seats	# Votes	% Votes	Seats	Status
2021	23,222	0.37%	1 / 155	25,297	0.54%	0 / 50	
