= National Alliance of Independents =

Alianza Nacional de los Independientes National Alliance of Independents
- Leader: Ricardo Fernández
- Founded: June 5, 2001
- Dissolved: July 4, 2006
- Merged into: Independent Regionalist Party
- Headquarters: Constitución 218, Oficina 2 Santiago
- Ideology: Regionalism

Website
- http://www.partido-ani.cl/

National Alliance of Independents (in Spanish: Alianza Nacional de Independientes, ANI) was a political party in Chile. It operated only in the regions IX, X and, XII in the southern parts of the country.

In the 2004 municipal elections, the ANI managed to obtain less than 1% of the vote.

On 4 July 2006 the ANI merged with the Regionalist Action Party of Chile to form the Regionalist Party of Independents.
