= Álvaro Pillado =

Chilean lawyer and politician

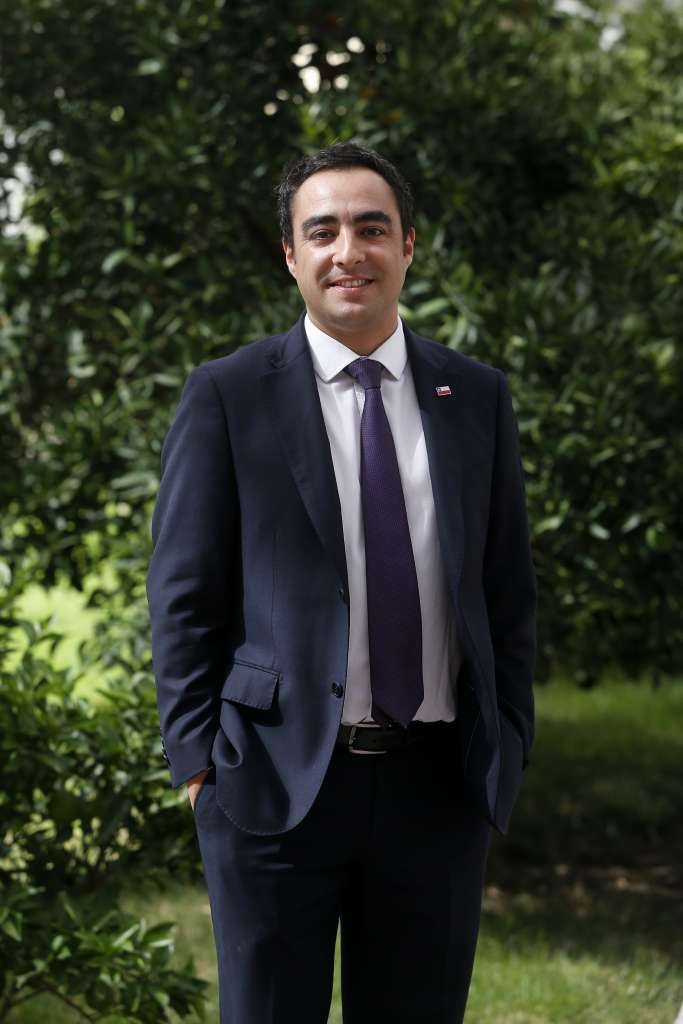
Image of Álvaro Pillado

Álvaro Sebastián Pillado Irribarra (Concepción, September 24, 1986) is a Chilean lawyer and politician, member of the Independent Democratic Union (UDI). He served as Undersecretary of National Assets and Director of the Division of Social Organizations (DOS) in the second term of President Sebastián Piñera Echenique.

== Public life ==
He was national youth president of the Independent Democratic Union (UDI) party. In 2011, he was selected as one of Chile's "100 young leaders" by El Sábado magazine of the El Mercurio newspaper. During the first term of Sebastián Piñera's presidency, he served as the deputy national director of the National Youth Institute (INJUV) and later as a legislative adviser in the Senate.

From 2018 to 2019, he worked as the director of the Division of Social Organizations (DOS) at the General Secretariat of Government. On November 11, 2019, he was appointed as the Undersecretary of National Assets by President Sebastián Piñera Echenique.
