= Independent Regionalist Party =

Political party in Chile

Independent Regionalist Party Partido Regionalista Independiente
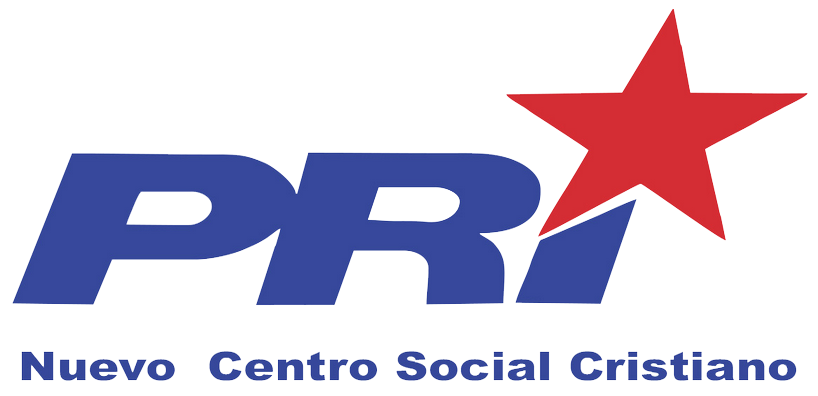
- President: Hugo Ortiz de Filippi
- Founded: July 4, 2006
- Dissolved: February 20, 2018
- Merger of: Regionalist Action Party of Chile and National Alliance of Independents
- Merged into: Democratic Independent Regionalist Party
- National affiliation: Chile Vamos
- Membership (2009): 40,852 (9th)
- Ideology: Regionalism; Reformism
- Political position: Centre
- Colours: Blue and Red
- Chamber of Deputies: 0 / 120
- Senate: 0 / 38

Website
- http://www.pricentro.cl/

The Independent Regionalist Party (Spanish: Partido Regionalista Independiente, PRI) was a centrist political party in Chile. The party was regionalist ideologically but had a nationwide presence. It was intended to be an alternative to the dominant coalitions in the Chilean electoral system, the New Majority and the Alliance.

It was formed by the merger of the National Alliance of Independents (ANI) and the Regionalist Action Party of Chile (PAR) on 4 July 2006. In 2008, a group of former members of the Christian Democratic Party joined, earning the name "Los Colorines" (the Redheads), referring to the hair color of their leader, Adolfo Zaldívar.

The party did not support any candidate in the 2009-10 presidential election. For the parliamentary election, the party joined the coalition "Clean Chile Vote Happy", along with Broad Social Movement and Country Force. Got the election of three deputies, who later left the party. For the 2013 presidential election, the Regionalist Party of the Independents selected as candidate political scientist Ricardo Israel, who ran for mayor of Santiago in the 2008 municipal election.

As of 2015, the PRI was part of the centre-right coalition Chile Vamos, with the National Renewal, Independent Democratic Union and Political Evolution political parties.

On 20 February 2018, the PRI was dissolved after it merged with the Patagonian Regional Democracy party to become the Democratic Independent Regionalist Party.

== Presidential candidates ==
The following is a list of the presidential candidates supported by the Independent Regionalist Party.

- 2009: none
- 2013: Ricardo Israel (lost)
- 2017: Sebastián Piñera (won)
