= Cathedral of the Most Holy Conception, Chile =

Roman Catholic cathedral in Concepción, Chile

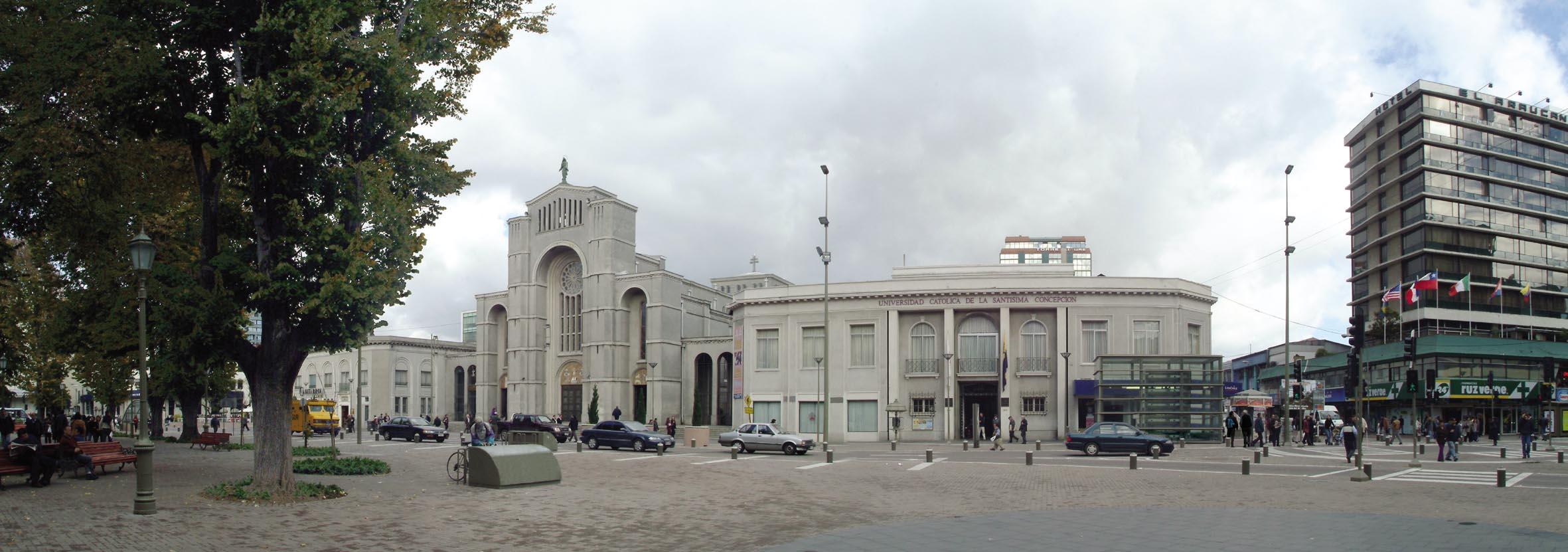
Cathedral of the Most Holy Conception, Chile - 36°49′39.1″S 73°3′4.71″W

The Cathedral of the Most Holy Conception (in Spanish: Catedral de la Santísima Concepción) is a Roman Catholic cathedral located in Concepción, Chile.

== Gallery ==
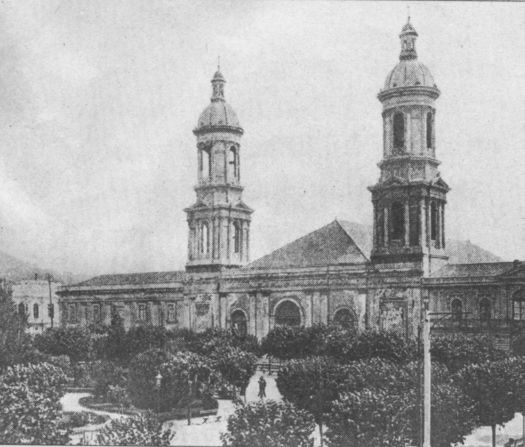
The Old Cathedral of Concepción

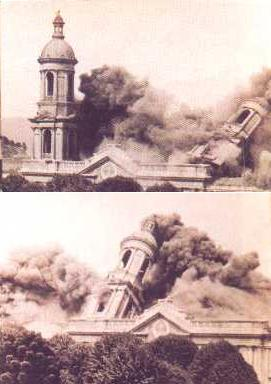
The demolition of the Old Cathedral in 1939

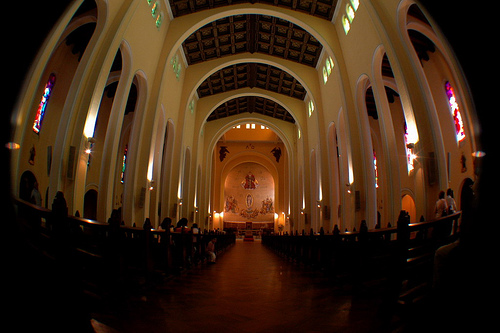
Inside the Cathedral of Concepción

== See also ==
- Roman Catholic Archdiocese of Concepción
- History of Concepción
- Catholic University of the Most Holy Conception
