= UCSC (disambiguation) =

UCSC is the University of California, Santa Cruz, a public research university in Santa Cruz, California, United States.

UCSC may also refer to:

- Università Cattolica del Sacro Cuore, a private Catholic university based in Milan, Italy
- University of Colombo School of Computing, a college affiliated with the University of Colombo in Sri Lanka
- University City Science Center, an urban research park in Philadelphia, Pennsylvania, United States
- Universidad Católica de la Santísima Concepción, a private catholic university in Chile
