= Central market of Concepción, Chile =

Marketplace in Concepción, Chile

Coordinates: 36°49′32″S 73°3′10″W

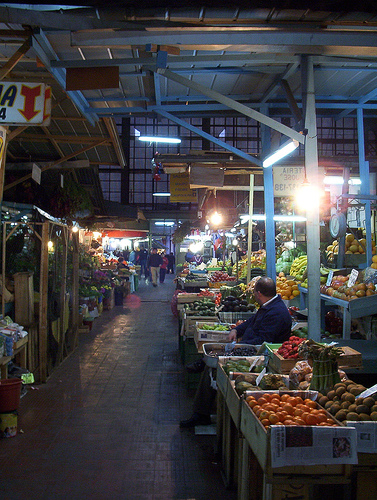
The Central market in 2005

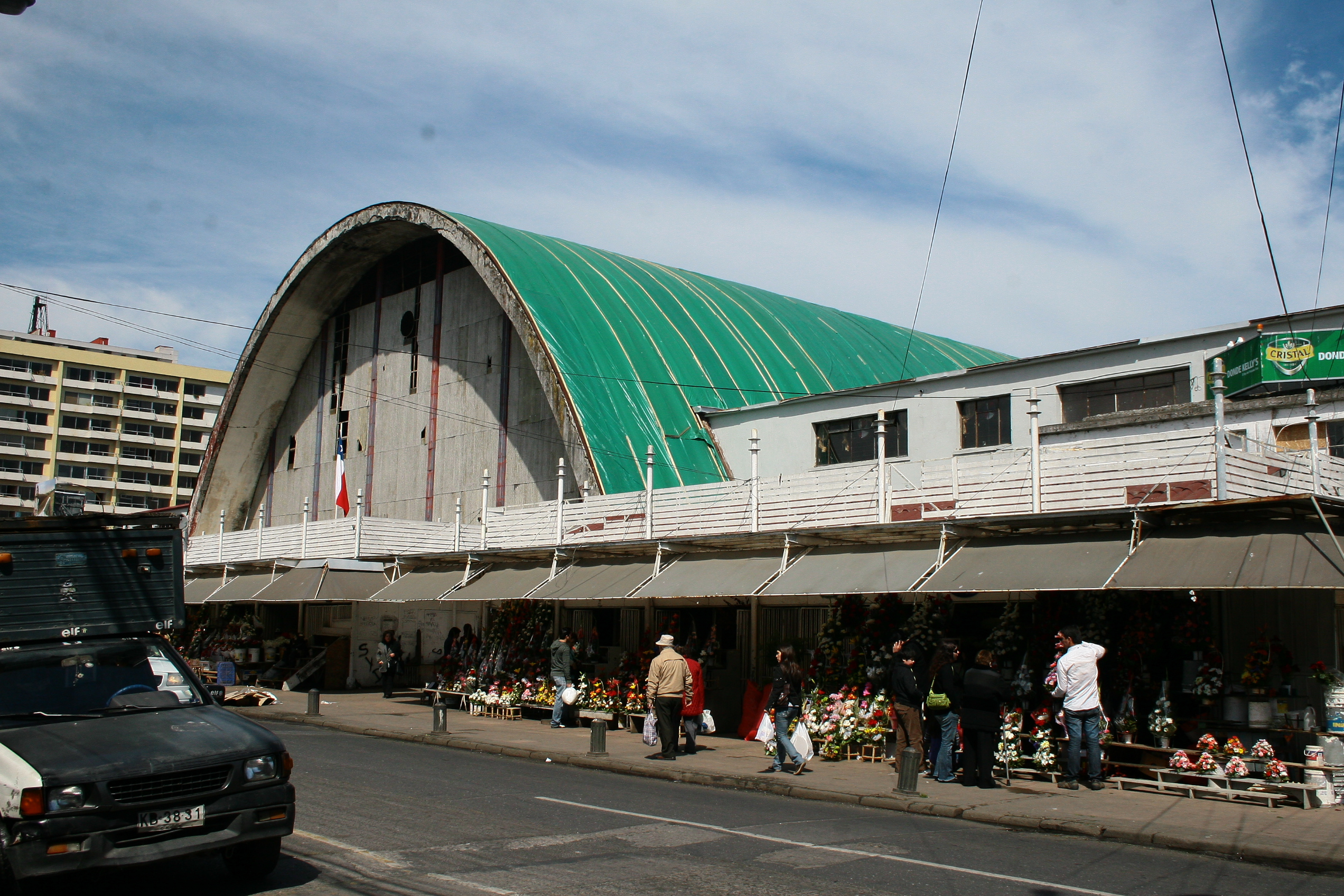
The Central market of Concepción

The Central market of Concepción was a marketplace of fruits and vegetables with restaurants in the downtown area of Concepción. The area of the Central market is 3,600 square metres (39,000 ft^{2}). After the earthquake of Chillán on 1939, the Central market was designed on 1940 by the architects Tibor Weiner and Ricardo Mulle.

== See also ==
- Central market
- Concepción
