= De Saloon =

Chilean pop and rock band

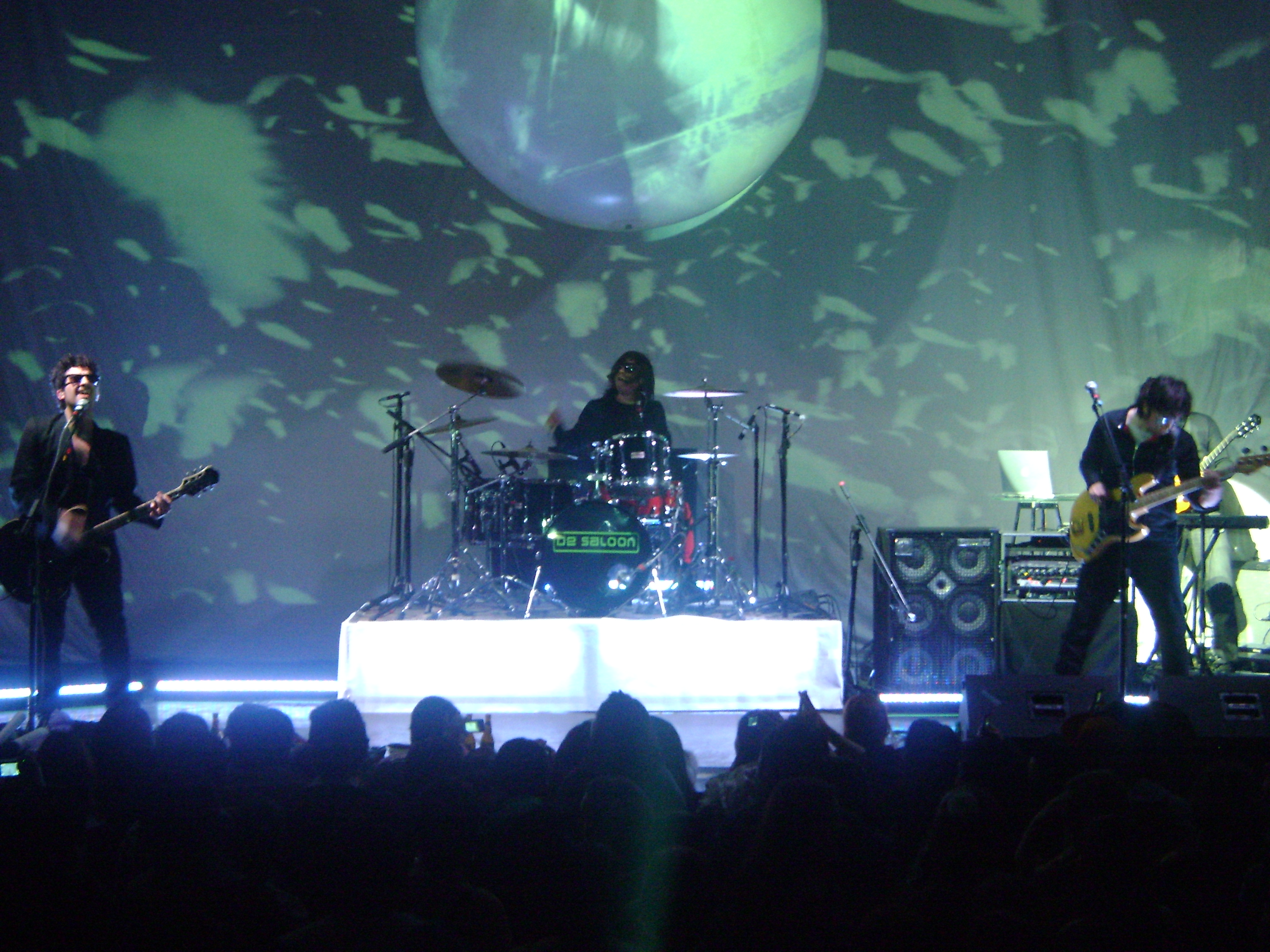

Background information
- Origin: Concepción, Chile
- Genres: pop music, pop rock
- Years active: 1997–present
- Labels: GmbH, Escarabajo, Feria Music
- Members: Jean Pierre Duhart; Ricardo Barrenechea; Roberto Arancibia
- Past members: José Miguel Amigo
- Website: desaloon.com

De Saloon are a Chilean pop and rock band originally from the city of Concepción, Chile.

== Early years ==
Jean Pierre Duhart and Ricardo Barrenechea had been friends since preschool. In their final years at school they met José Miguel Amigo, who introduced them to Roberto Arancibia, and together the four decided to form a band and relocate to Santiago in 1997. The band was originally a quartet, but José Miguel Amigo left the group in 1998 to go back to Concepción and later moved abroad to Germany.

== First tracks ==
Once in Santiago, the band participated in workshops at Balmaceda 1215, a Chilean institution dedicated to the arts. They went on to win a competition which gave them the funds to record their first demo, "Esfumar". Despite the fact that they had not yet been signed, the song got airtime on local Chilean radio stations and become popular in the grassroots Chilean music scene, as did their second, "Brigida".

== Studio albums, international success and festivals ==
The band did not release their first album, the self-titled De Saloon, until 2003 with the record label GmbH. Their second album, Morder (2004), came faster, but was not without problems: when GmbH went under, the album had to be re-edited with the label Escarabajo in 2006. Their third, Abrázame ("Hold Me" in Spanish), was produced by the band independently in 2006. It went on to be one of their most successful and was re-released in Mexico by Warner Music Group.

After three years of touring, De Saloon signed with Feria Music, and returned to the studio to record their fourth album, Delicada Violencia. Recorded and mixed in Buenos Aires, Argentina, Delicada Violencia was produced by the well-known musician-producers Tweety González and Richard Coleman. Fans got a chance to hear the new album live in 2009 when the band performed in front of 50,000 people at the Cumbre del Rock Chileno, a huge Chilean rock festival, with Los Tres, Lucybell, Los Bunkers and Manuel García. They also joined Banda Conmoción, Camila Moreno and Chancho en Piedra, among others, to perform at the Día de la Musica (Music Day 2009), a massive event held on 22 November 2009 in Parque O'Higgins, Santiago.

In late 2009, the band released their first DVD, De Saloon en Vivo ("De Saloon Live"), a recording of a concert on 1 August 2009 during the official launch of Delicada Violencia. Throughout 2010, the band focused on recording their fifth studio album, Fortaleza ("Strength"), their second with 'Feria Music'. The album was influenced by the earthquake on 27 February 2010.

De Saloon was part of the line-up for the third edition of Lollapalooza Chile, that took place in Santiago in 6–7 April 2013.

== Members ==
- Jean Pierre Duhart
- Ricardo Barrenechea
- Roberto Arancibia

=== Former members ===
- José Miguel Amigo

== Discography ==
- De Saloon (2003)
- Morder (2004)
- Abrázame (2006)
- Delicada Violencia (2008)
- Fortaleza (2010)
- Mar de Nubes (2014)

== DVD ==
- En Vivo (2009)

== Performed on ==
- Qué pena siente el alma, Album Cantores que reflexionan: sintiendo a Violeta (2007)
- El aparecido, Album A la salud de la música chilena: Inti-Illimani histórico (2009)
