= Concepción, Chile =

City and commune in Biobío region, Chile

Concepción La Concepción de María Purísima del Nuevo Extremo (original name)
- City and commune
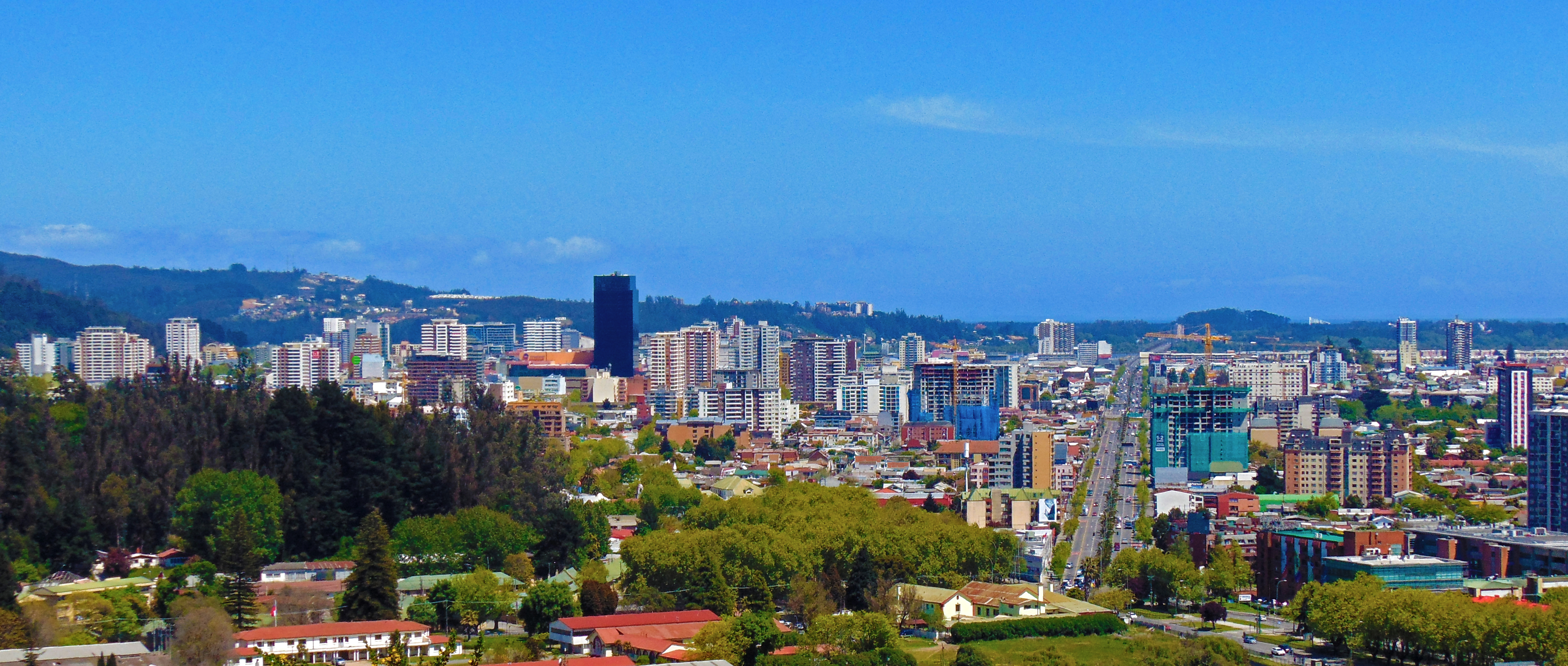
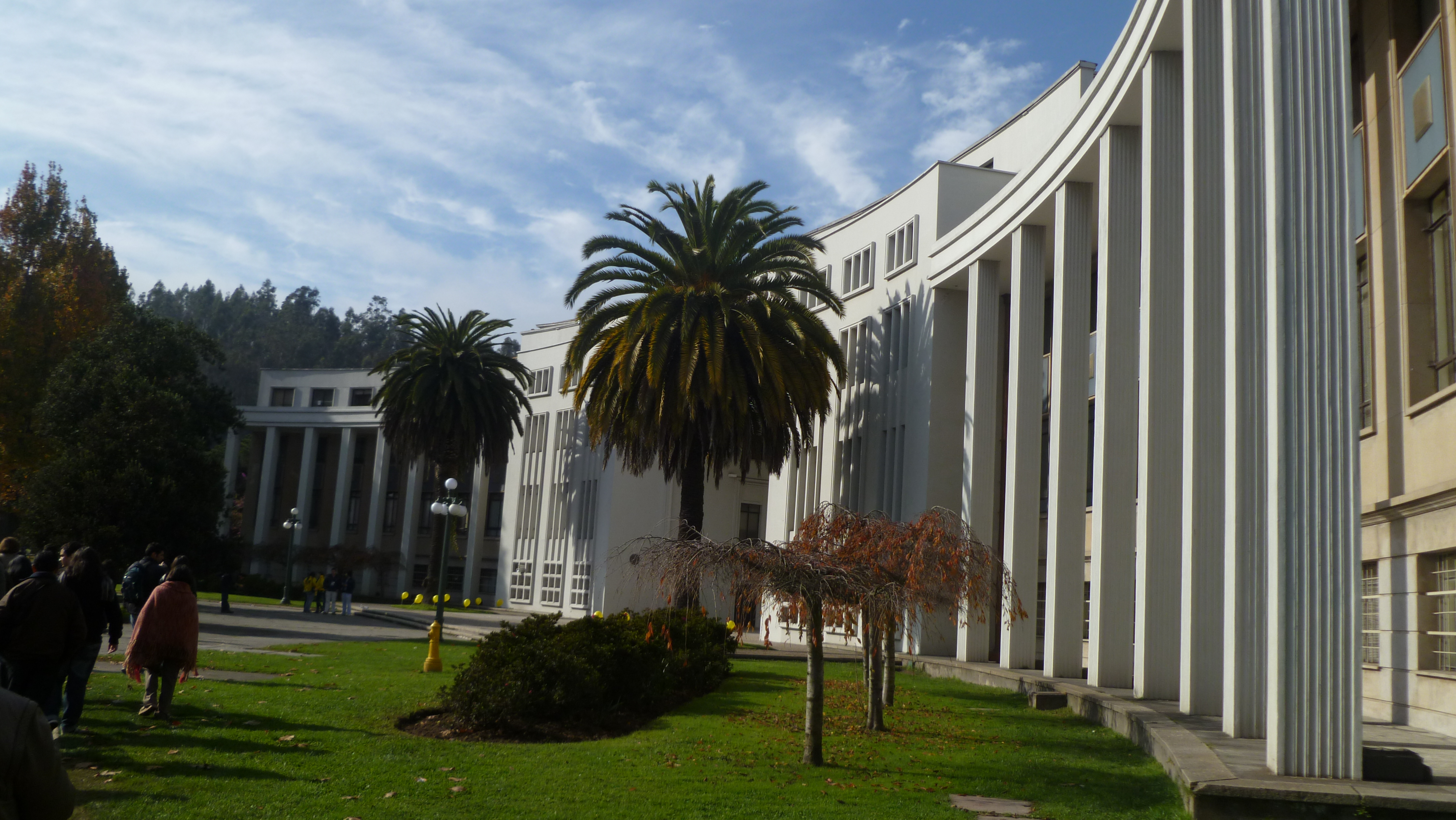
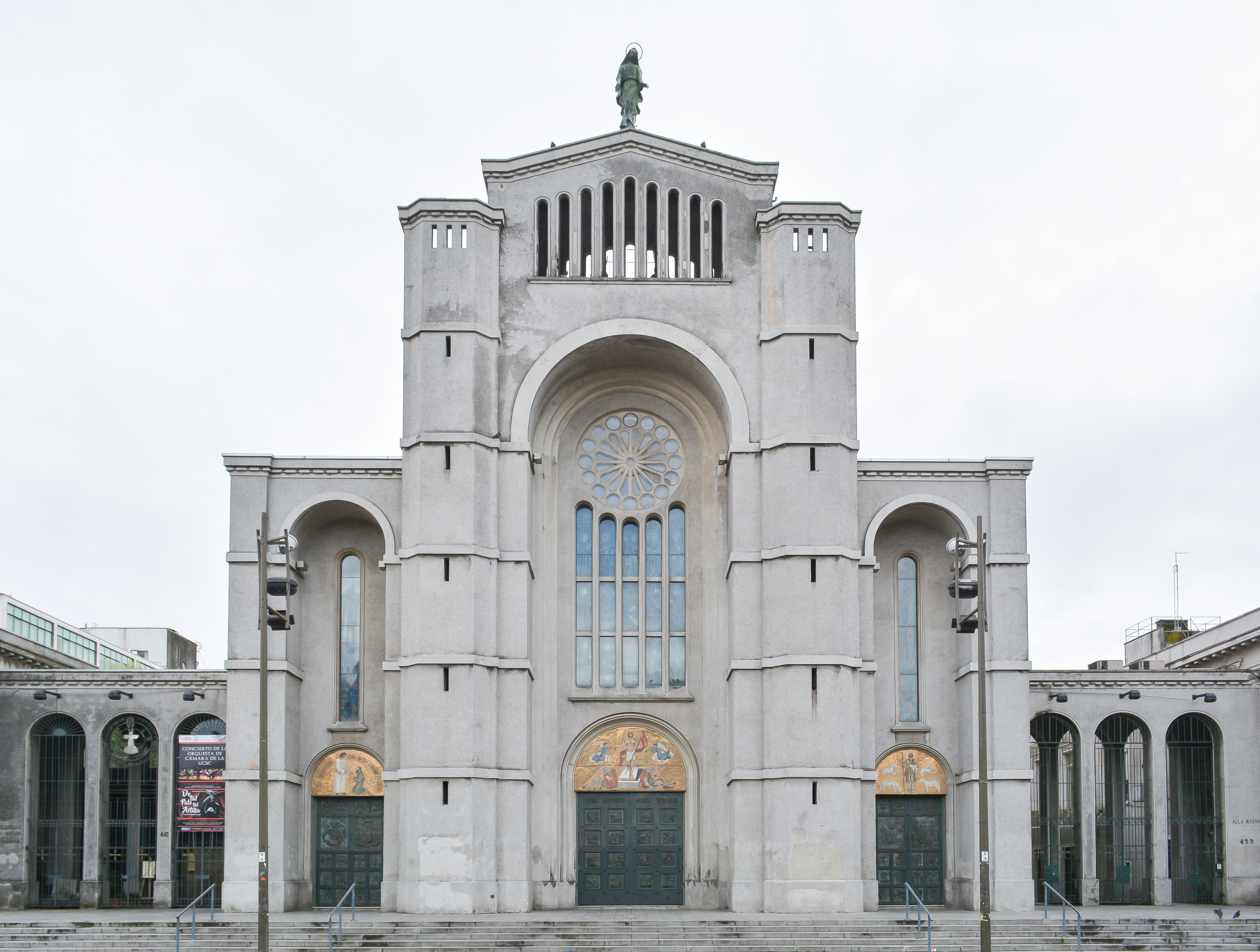
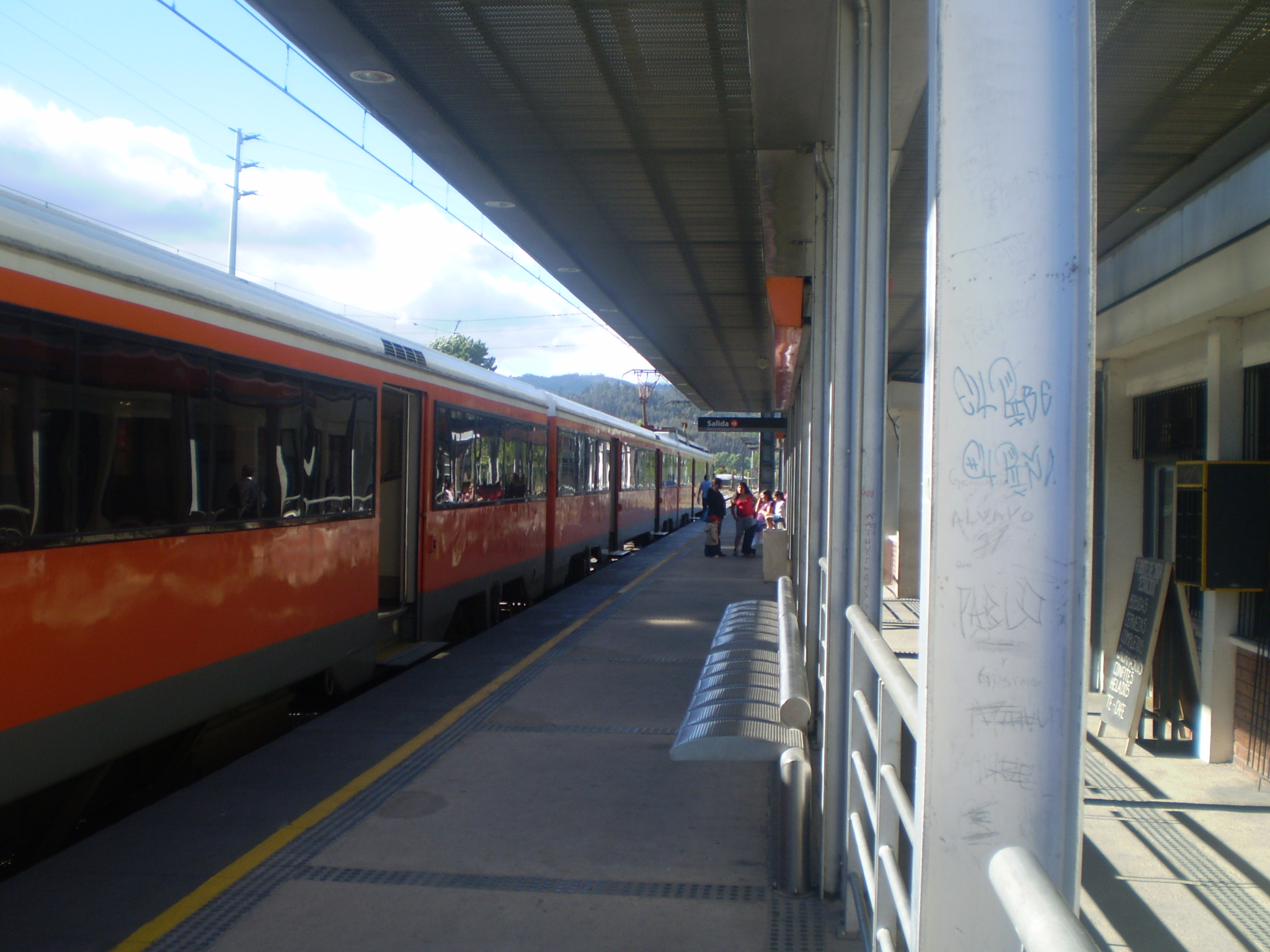
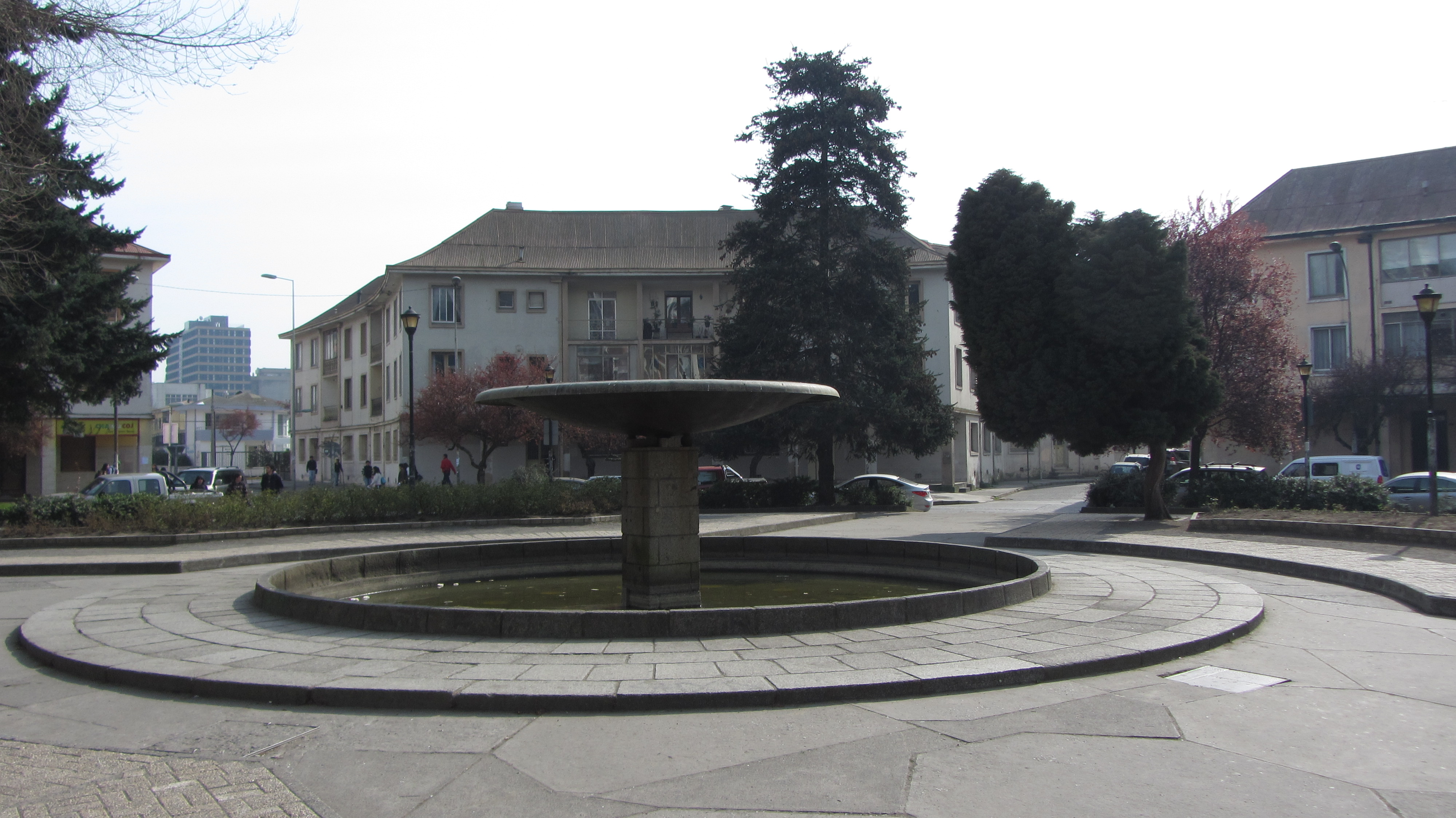
- Concepción skyline University of Concepción Cathedral of the Most Holy Conception Biotren Plaza Perú

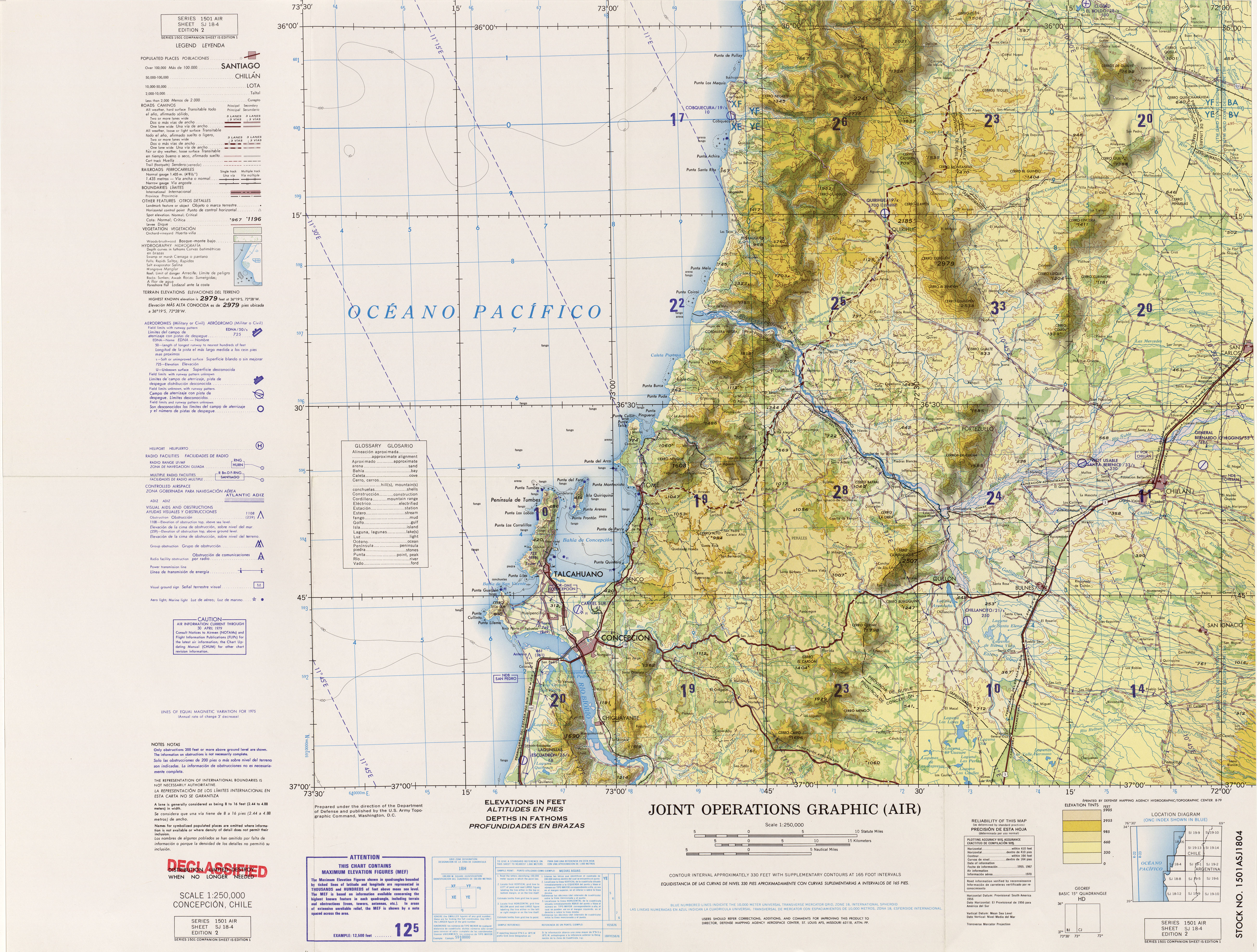
- Flag Coat of arms Location in the Bío Bío Region Location in Chile
- Nicknames: Biobío's Pearl, The University City, The cradle of Chilean rock
- Motto: La Capital del Sur de Chile; The Capital of Southern Chile
- Coordinates: 36°49′41.50″S 73°03′04.93″W
- Country: Chile
- Region: Biobío
- Province: Concepción
- Founded: October 5, 1550
- Founder: Pedro de Valdivia
- Named for: Immaculate Conception

Government
  - Type: Municipality
  - Mayor: Héctor Muñoz (PCC)

Area
  - City and commune: 222 km^{2} (86 sq mi)
- Elevation: 12 m (39 ft)

Population (2017)
  - City and commune: 223,574
  - Density: 1,318/km^{2} (3,410/sq mi)
  - Urban: 719,944
  - Metro: 971,285
- Demonym: Penquista

GDP (PPP, constant 2015 values)
  - Year: 2023
  - Total: $22.0 billion
- Time zone: UTC−4 (CLT)
  - Summer (DST): UTC−3 (CLST)
- Post code: 3349001
- Telephone prefix: 56 + 41
- Climate: Csb
- Website: www.concepcion.cl (in Spanish)

Concepción (Spanish pronunciation: [konseβˈsjon]; originally: Concepción de la Madre Santísima de la Luz, "Conception of the Blessed Mother of Light") is a city and commune in south-central Chile, and the geographical and demographic core of the Greater Concepción metropolitan area, it is the second largest city in Chile by urban area and one of the three major conurbations in the country. It has a significant impact on domestic trade being part of the most heavily industrialized region in the country. It is the seat of the Concepción Province and the capital of the Biobío Region. It sits about 500 km south of the nation's capital, Santiago.

The city was first settled in the Bay of Concepción, in the zone that would later become the commune of Penco, now part of the Concepción conurbation. The city's demonym, penquista, comes from the place of its original foundation. The city center and historic district is located in the Valle de la Mocha (La Mocha Valley), where it relocated after serious damage left by an earthquake in 1751.

The origin of Concepción dates back to 1550, when it was founded by Pedro de Valdivia as part of the Spanish Empire, under the name of Concepción de María Purísima del Nuevo Extremo, and was the capital of the Kingdom of Chile between 1565 and 1573, retaining the unofficial position of military capital for the rest of the colonial period. The city was an important site in the struggle for Chile's independence, with the Chilean declaration of Independence being held at Concepción's Plaza de la Independencia. Until the election of Manuel Montt in 1851 as president, executive power in independent Chile was dominated by Concepción elites.

The city is a known college town in Chile, as it is home to numerous educational institutions, including the University of Concepción, the University of the Bío Bío, and the Catholic University of the Most Holy Conception. The commune also contains various historical bridges, murals, parks and lakes, as well as important cultural venues such as the Teatro Biobío, the Casa del Arte, the local Natural History Museum, and the Teatro Universidad de Concepción.

== History ==
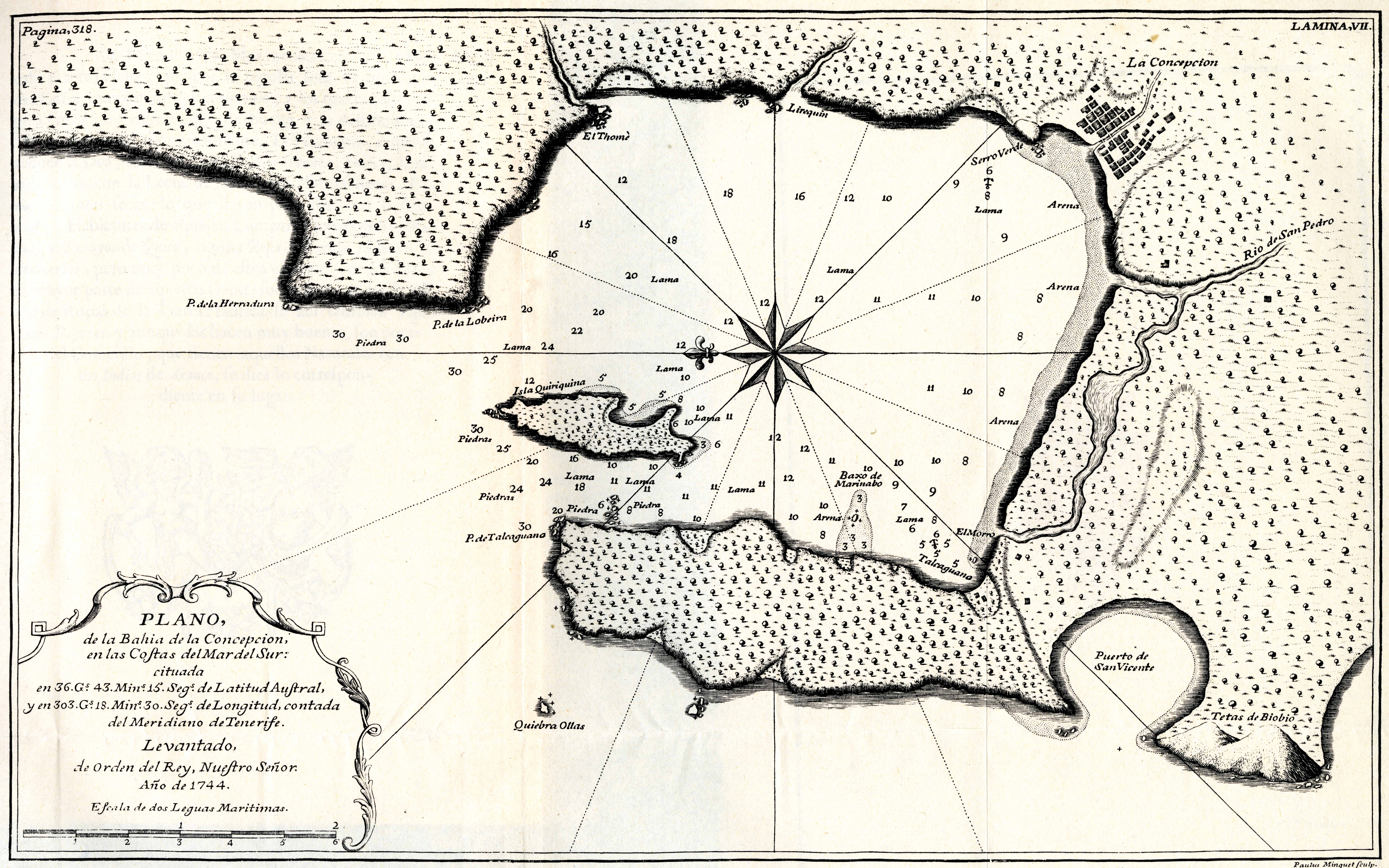
Plan from 1744 showing the Bay of Concepción before the 1751 earthquake

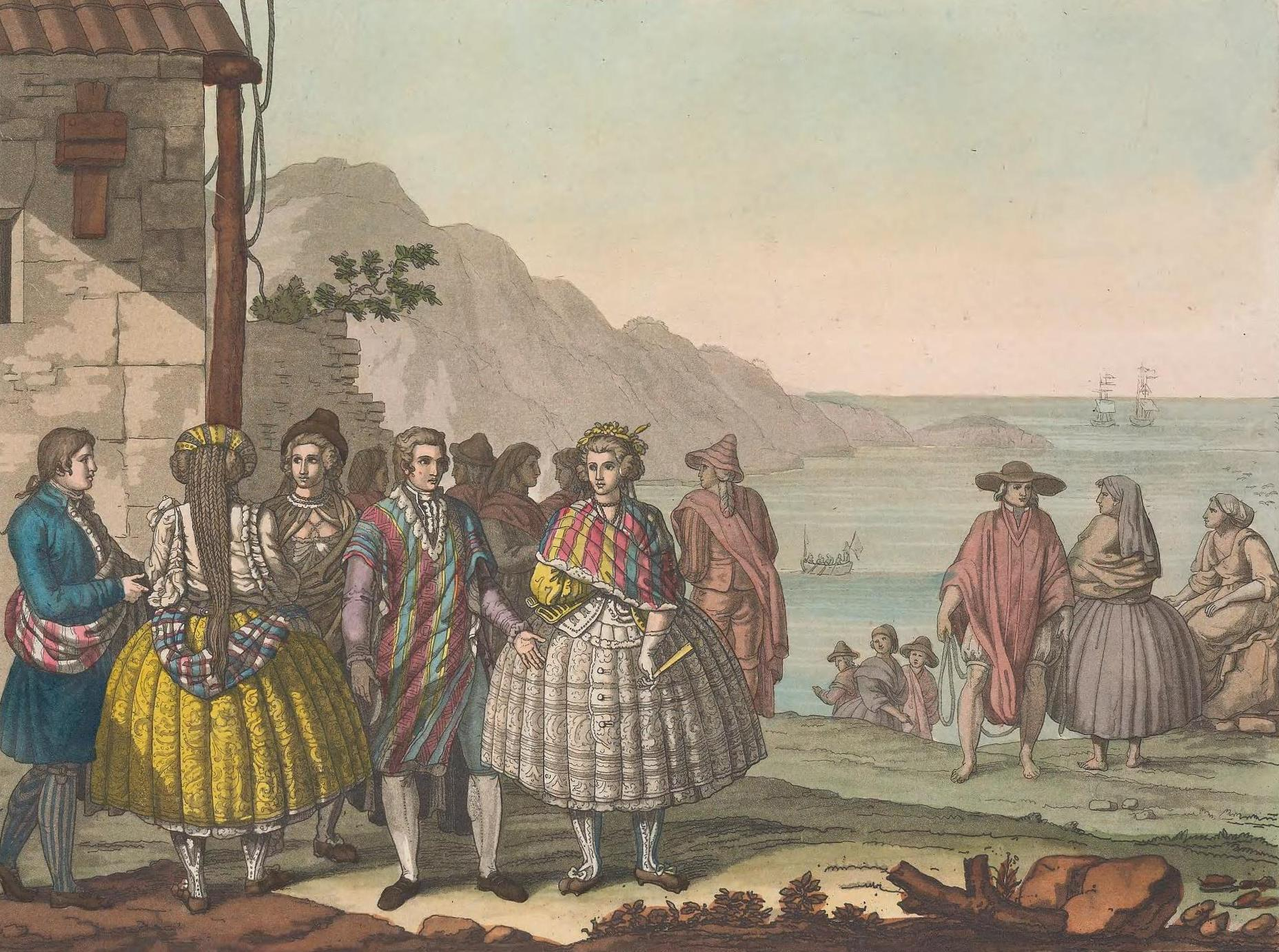
Clothing of the inhabitants of Concepción in the early 19th century

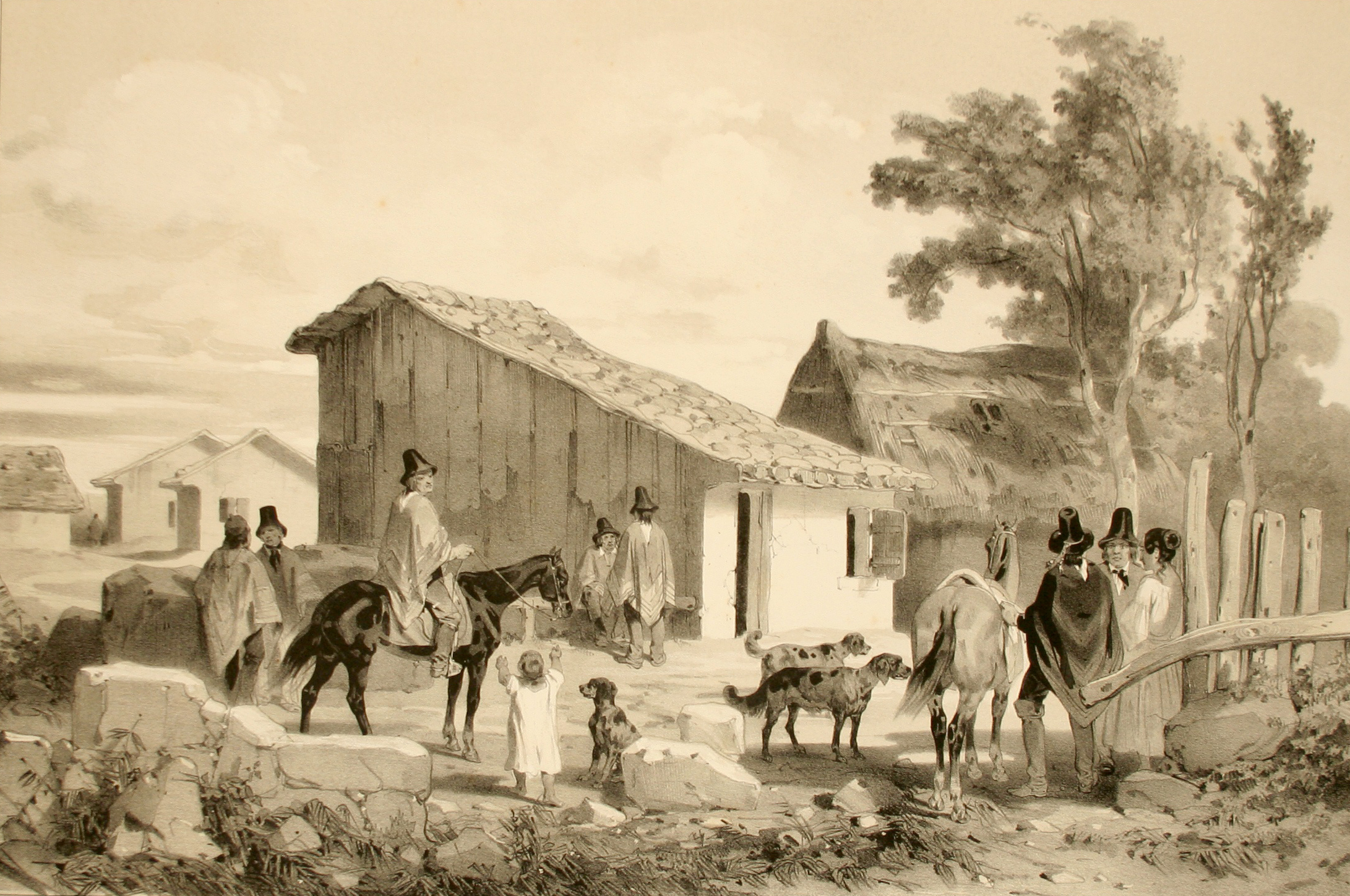
House of a Mapuche cacique in Concepción in 1846

Concepción was founded by Don Pedro de Valdivia in 1550 north of the Bío Bío River, at the site which is today known as Penco. At that time it was given the name Concepción de María Purísima del Nuevo Extremo (Mary Immaculate Conception of the New End). The new settlement of Concepción was just a few kilometers north of La Frontera (The Frontier), the boundary between Spanish territory and the land of the Mapuche, an American Indian ethnic group that remained independent until the 1870s. The settlement was formally recognized by the Spanish authorities as a town two years later by a royal decree. It was given a coat-of-arms that is still in use today.

At the time of the Spanish arrival to the Concepción area chronicler Jerónimo de Vivar noted local Mapuches wore gold and silver bracelets and "sort of crowns". This is interpreted either as Incan gifts, war spoils from defeated Incas, or the adoption of Incan metallurgy.

Although Concepción was a significant military settlement for the Captaincy General of Chile, it was overrun and destroyed by Mapuche armies in 1554, and once again after being refounded in 1555. Concepción was restored during the governorship of García Hurtado de Mendoza when he landed there and built a fort on the Alto de Pinto in 1557. The town was refounded once more on January 6, 1558, by captain Jerónimo de Villegas. It became the headquarters of the military forces engaged against the Mapuche in La Araucanía over the next two centuries, growing to a population of 10,000 despite a siege in 1564 and other attacks by the Mapuche. Concepción was the home of the Real Audiencia from 1565 to 1575.

Earthquakes and tsunamis, which razed the town in 1570, 1657, 1687, 1730 and 1751, led the authorities to move the town to its current site in the Valle de la Mocha, alongside the Bío Bío River; the old site lay empty until March 29, 1842, when the present town of Penco was founded.

The new site for the town of Concepción became the main town of the Intendancy of Concepción, whose jurisdiction extended from the Maule River to La Frontera. The first Intendant of Concepción was the Irishman Ambrose O'Higgins, Marquis of Osorno, who later became Royal Governor of Chile and Viceroy of Peru.

When the First National Government Board met in Santiago on September 18, 1810, citizens of Concepción joined up. Concepción was used as the point of entry by the Spanish Army in the attempt by the Viceroyalty of Peru to re-conquer Chile. Concepción politicians and soldiers became a significant political force in the newly independent country.

On January 1, 1818, Ambrose O'Higgins's son, Bernardo O'Higgins, proclaimed and took the oath of the Chilean War of Independence in the main square of Concepción, which since then has been known as "Plaza de la Independencia". Until the moment of independence, the city had been the scene of various engagements in its old and new settlements.

On February 20, 1835, the town again was largely destroyed by an earthquake and had to be rebuilt.

By 1875, a key British community and German colony existed within the province. By 1895, there was an even larger Spanish presence.

The Universidad de Concepción, founded in 1919, became the first secular private university in Chile. The neighboring harbor of Talcahuano is the site of the largest naval base in Chile.

On February 27, 2010, an 8.8 magnitude earthquake struck the city of Concepción, killing more than 521 people and injuring thousands nationwide. Following the earthquake, geologists relying on global positioning satellite (GPS) data concluded that the city had been displaced roughly 3 meters (9.8 feet) to the west as a result of the event. The tsunami that followed missed the city.

After the 2010 Chile earthquake, a prison riot began in Concepción's El Manzano prison following a failed escape attempt by the inmates. Different parts of the prison were set on fire and the riot was controlled only after the guards shot into the air and received help from military units. As of March 5, 2010, a Peruvian field hospital has been deployed to the city.

A 23 year old Chilean forestry student named Jorge Matute disappeared mysteriously in a discotheque that was located close to Concepción on 20 November 1999. In February 2004 on a road in Santa Juana, Matute's remains were found and identified.

== Geography ==
=== Seismology ===
Like most of the Chilean territory, the Concepción region is seismically active, with much of Concepción destroyed by a violent earthquake in 1939. An earthquake in 1953 damaged 15% of the town's buildings. Another major earthquake in 1960 had a nearby epicenter.

On February 27, 2010, a magnitude 8.8 earthquake struck at 35.846°S, 72.719°W, 115 km (71 mi) NNE of the city. The United States Geological Survey said the earthquake struck at 0334 GMT on Saturday at a depth of 35 km (22 mi). The effects were felt as far away as São Paulo, Brazil—4,620 kilometres (2,870 mi) away.

=== Climate ===
The climate of Concepción is classified as Köppen: Csb, warm summer mediterranean, with a dry mild summer. The cool waters of the Pacific Ocean help to maintain mild temperatures throughout the year. Temperatures rarely exceed 30 °C (86 °F) or fall below 0 °C (32.0 °F). In the six-month period between May and October, the city receives approximately 83% of its total annual precipitation, which totals 984 mm (38.7 in). The wettest month since records began in 1912 was June 2000 with 565.7 millimetres (22.3 in), whilst all months from November to April have been rainless on occasions.

Climate data for Concepción, Chile (Carriel Sur International Airport) 1991–2020, extremes 1966–present
Month	Jan	Feb	Mar	Apr	May	Jun	Jul	Aug	Sep	Oct	Nov	Dec	Year
Record high °C (°F)	34.1 (93.4)	34.4 (93.9)	30.9 (87.6)	27.2 (81.0)	25.8 (78.4)	22.0 (71.6)	21.7 (71.1)	25.0 (77.0)	28.8 (83.8)	27.6 (81.7)	32.5 (90.5)	33.4 (92.1)	34.4 (93.9)
Mean daily maximum °C (°F)	23.0 (73.4)	22.5 (72.5)	21.3 (70.3)	18.4 (65.1)	15.7 (60.3)	13.8 (56.8)	13.3 (55.9)	14.0 (57.2)	15.6 (60.1)	17.2 (63.0)	19.5 (67.1)	21.5 (70.7)	18.0 (64.4)
Daily mean °C (°F)	17.1 (62.8)	16.7 (62.1)	15.6 (60.1)	13.3 (55.9)	11.7 (53.1)	10.2 (50.4)	9.5 (49.1)	10.0 (50.0)	10.9 (51.6)	12.3 (54.1)	14.2 (57.6)	15.9 (60.6)	13.1 (55.6)
Mean daily minimum °C (°F)	11.2 (52.2)	10.9 (51.6)	10.0 (50.0)	8.3 (46.9)	7.7 (45.9)	6.7 (44.1)	5.7 (42.3)	6.0 (42.8)	6.2 (43.2)	7.4 (45.3)	8.8 (47.8)	10.3 (50.5)	8.3 (46.9)
Record low °C (°F)	4.6 (40.3)	3.6 (38.5)	1.6 (34.9)	−1.0 (30.2)	−2.1 (28.2)	−2.2 (28.0)	−3.8 (25.2)	−2.5 (27.5)	−1.4 (29.5)	−0.8 (30.6)	1.6 (34.9)	3.4 (38.1)	−3.8 (25.2)
Average precipitation mm (inches)	9.9 (0.39)	14.9 (0.59)	22.2 (0.87)	68.8 (2.71)	151.6 (5.97)	221.2 (8.71)	168.1 (6.62)	148.9 (5.86)	77.2 (3.04)	53.2 (2.09)	27.2 (1.07)	21.1 (0.83)	984.3 (38.75)
Average precipitation days (≥ 1.0 mm)	1.2	1.7	2.5	5.5	9.7	13.9	12.4	11.5	7.2	5.9	3.9	2.6	78.0
Average relative humidity (%)	74	76	79	83	87	87	85	83	81	79	77	75	81
Mean monthly sunshine hours	327.6	279.3	252.3	185.4	131.0	111.9	133.6	154.3	196.2	244.6	286.2	317.0	2,619.4
Source 1: Dirección Meteorológica de Chile
Source 2: NOAA (precipitation days 1991–2020)

As might be expected for such a large urban area heavily dependent on wood-burning for heat and diesel for transport, the air in Concepción is third-most polluted in Chile, after Santiago and Temuco.

== Demographics ==
Historical population
Year	Pop.	±% p.a.
1970	161,006	—
1982	267,891	+4.33%
1992	326,784	+2.01%
2002	216,061	−4.05%
2017	223,574	+0.23%
2024	230,375	+0.43%
Source: 1970–1992, 2002, 2017

According to data collected in 2024 in the Census of the National Institute of Statistics, the township has an area of 221.6 km^{2} (86 sq mi) and a population of 230,375 inhabitants, of whom 110,985 are men and 119,390 are women.

As a commune, Concepcion is home to 14.28% of the total population of the region. 1.88% (4,058 persons) is for the rural population and 98.12% (212,003) for the urban population. Moreover, 5.5% of the country's population lives in the Greater Concepción metro area.

Between 1970 and 1982 there is a large increase in the population. One reason is the inclusion of San Pedro, segregated from the municipality of Coronel.

The Concepción commune population sharply declined in 1996 as its territory was divided, creating Chiguayante and San Pedro de la Paz. The number of people living in these communes has grown quickly since they have become bedroom communities of Concepción, i.e. residential cities that do not have a center with many shops, as is the case of Concepcion.

There is a significant percentage of foreign residents in the city, the most numerous are the Spanish, Italian and US expatriate communities. There are also smaller segments of German, French, British, Dutch, Greek, Portuguese, Croatian, Scandinavian, Arab and Australian descendants in a city settled by waves of immigration.

== Economy ==
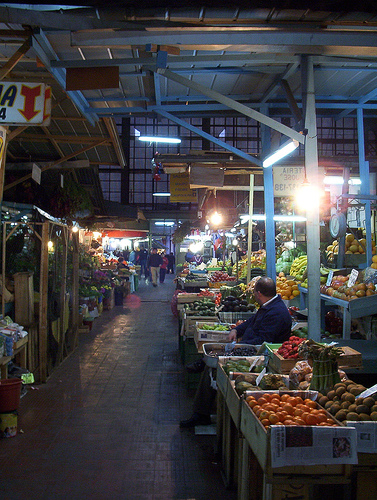
Concepción is the second commercial nucleus of Chile. In the image, the Concepción Central Market

Historically characterized by a strong manufacturing industry, Concepción has also been a major center for distribution and services and the financial basis of the regional economy.

=== Commerce ===
Trade in the city is concentrated in the Plaza Independencia (Independence Square), the pedestrian street Alonso de Ercilla y Zúñiga (built in 1981), and along the major avenues. One such avenue is the Diego Barros Arana street which has developed into the commercial center of the city and the region was until 1907 even known as "calle Comercio" ("Commerce Street"). New commercial centers are being developed around the old central station and the new civic district as a part of the Chilean bicentennial (September 18, 2010). A considerable percentage of local trade is taking place in settlements around the city, in communes such as Hualpén, Talcahuano and San Pedro de la Paz, where there are bustling shopping centers, such as Mall Plaza del Trébol, and where there is a constant commercial development.

Other commercial spots, related to food, are the Vega Monumental and Mercado Central de Concepción (Central Market of Concepción) places offering various services and agricultural and livestock products.

== Administration ==
As a commune, Concepción is a third-level administrative division of Chile administered by a municipal council, headed by a mayor who is directly elected every four years. The 2024–2028 mayor is Héctor Muñoz (PCC), while the councilors are the following:

- Osvaldo Aqueveque (REP)
- Christian Paulsen (UDI)
- Miguel Berrios (RN)
- Oscar Ramírez (DC)
- Eric Riquelme (FA)
- Francisca Collipal (PCC)
- Andrea Estrada (REP)
- Yulisa Ojeda (PCC)
- Claudia Arriagada (Ind.)
- Olimpia Riveros (PC)

Within the electoral divisions of Chile, Concepción is represented in the Chamber of Deputies by Gaston Saavedra (PS), José Miguel Ortiz (PDC), Jaime Toha (PS), Felix Gonzalez (PEV), Enrique Van Rysselberghe (UDI), Sergio Bobadilla (UDI), Francesca Muñoz (RN) and Leonidas Romero (RN), as part of the 21st electoral district (Concepción Province without Lota). The commune is represented in the Senate by Alejandro Navarro Brain (MAS) and Jacqueline Van Rysselberghe (UDI) as part of the 12th senatorial constituency (Biobío-Costa).

== Culture ==
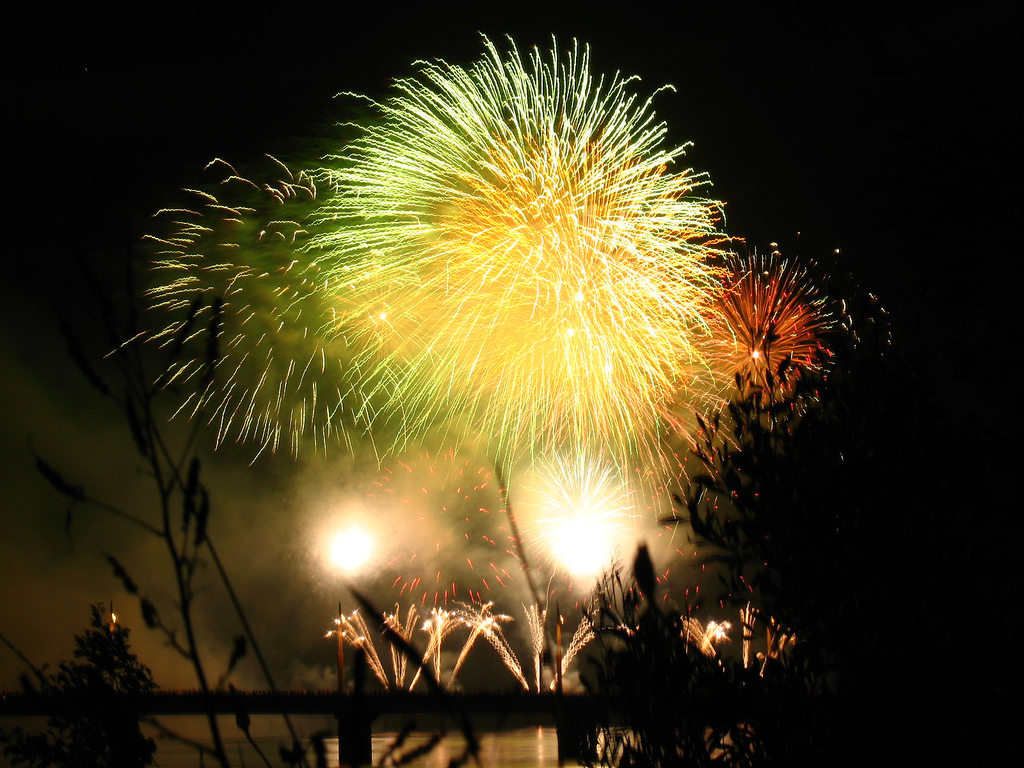
Fireworks in celebration for the arrival of 2007 in Concepción

To an outsider, there may be confusion between the demonyms of the inhabitants of Concepción and the nearby city of Penco. Due to the previous location of Concepción being where Penco currently stands, inhabitants of Concepción are called penquistas while inhabitants of Penco are known as pencones. Additionally, the unofficial term pencopolitano has been coined to refer to locals of any commune belonging to the metropolis or, in a wider definition, to the Concepción province, although the term penquista can technically be used in this case as well.

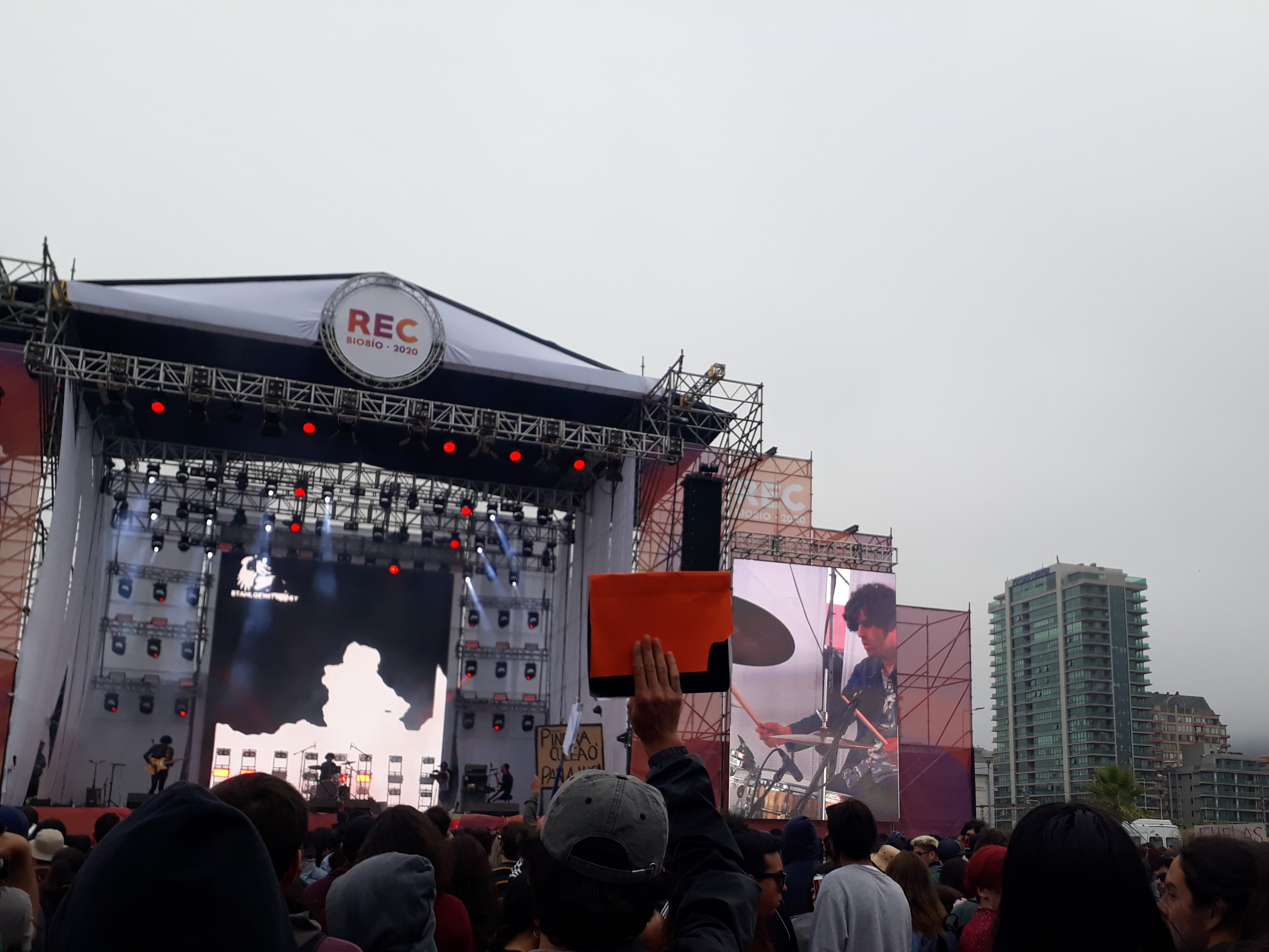
Rock en Conce festival, 2020.

In 2014, the Rock en Conce festival began to take shape. It would be held outdoors, in the city's Parque Bicentenario (Bicentennial Park), and access to it would be free. The aim of the festival would be to restore the musical spotlight that the city embodied and that earned it the reputation of being the cradle of Chilean rock and, at the same time, to establish itself as a major tourist attraction for the city. Its first edition took place on Saturday, March 7, 2015, and since then it has been held with great success every year at the end of each summer, bringing together emerging local bands with major and renowned artists from the national and international scene.

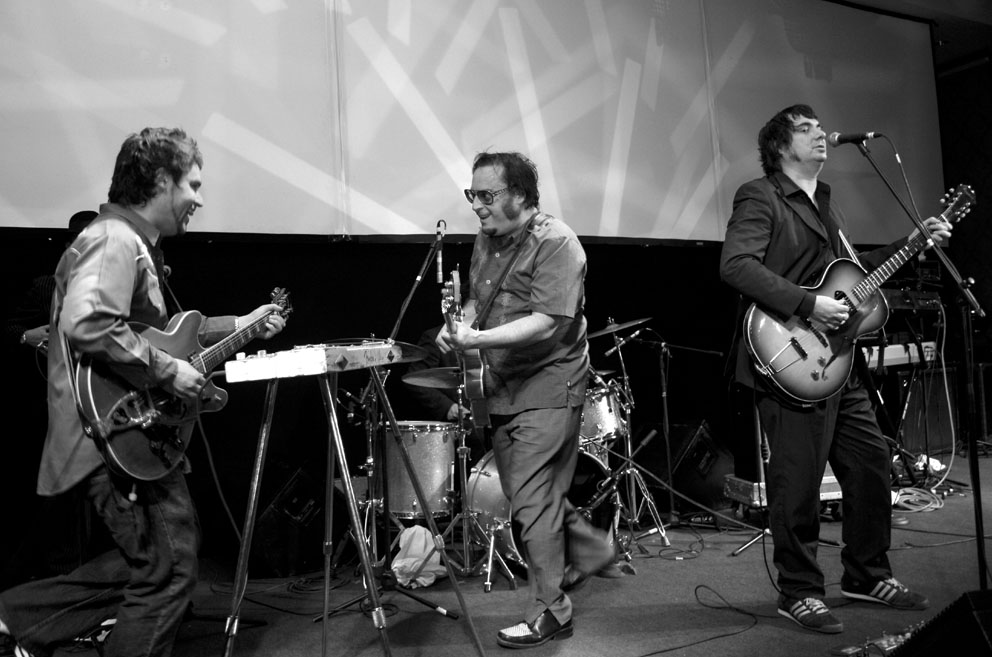
The Los Tres band was born in the city of Concepción

=== Music ===
Concepción has been described as the "Chilean capital of rock", since numerous bands of this genre have started their careers in the city, such as Los Tres, Los Bunkers, Emociones Clandestinas, Santos Dumont, De Saloon, Machuca and Julius Popper, among others. Numerous bands have played their first major concerts in the city, such as Los Prisioneros.

The city's music venues are a main feature of the tourist route, La Ruta de la Música, a project driven by the National Service of Tourism (SERNATUR), where besides the rock scene, the local jazz and folk scenes are also shown.

== Sports ==
Concepción was one of the host cities of the official 1959 Basketball World Cup, where Chile won the bronze medal.

Today, Concepción is home to three professional football teams:

- Club Deportivo Universidad de Concepción, currently in the Primera División
- Club Deportivo Ferroviario Almirante Arturo Fernández Vial, currently, in the Chilean second division
- Club de Deportes Concepción, currently in the Chilean third division.

The most notable professional basketball team is:

- C.D. Universidad de Concepción, currently in the Liga Nacional de Básquetbol de Chile.

== Transportation ==
The city is served by Carriel Sur International Airport in Talcahuano. The metro area's public transportation comprises a number of bus lines that run through several avenues and streets of the communes belonging to the agglomeration, as well as the commuter rail system known as Biotrén.

== Education ==
Concepción is known as "the university city" thanks to the numerous universities within the urban agglomeration, such as the Universidad de Concepción, Universidad Católica de la Santísima Concepción and Universidad del Biobío. This city also has numerous headquarters for many other universities. In addition, this metropolis has a large educational offer, focused on institutes, centers of technical formation and the universities aforementioned.

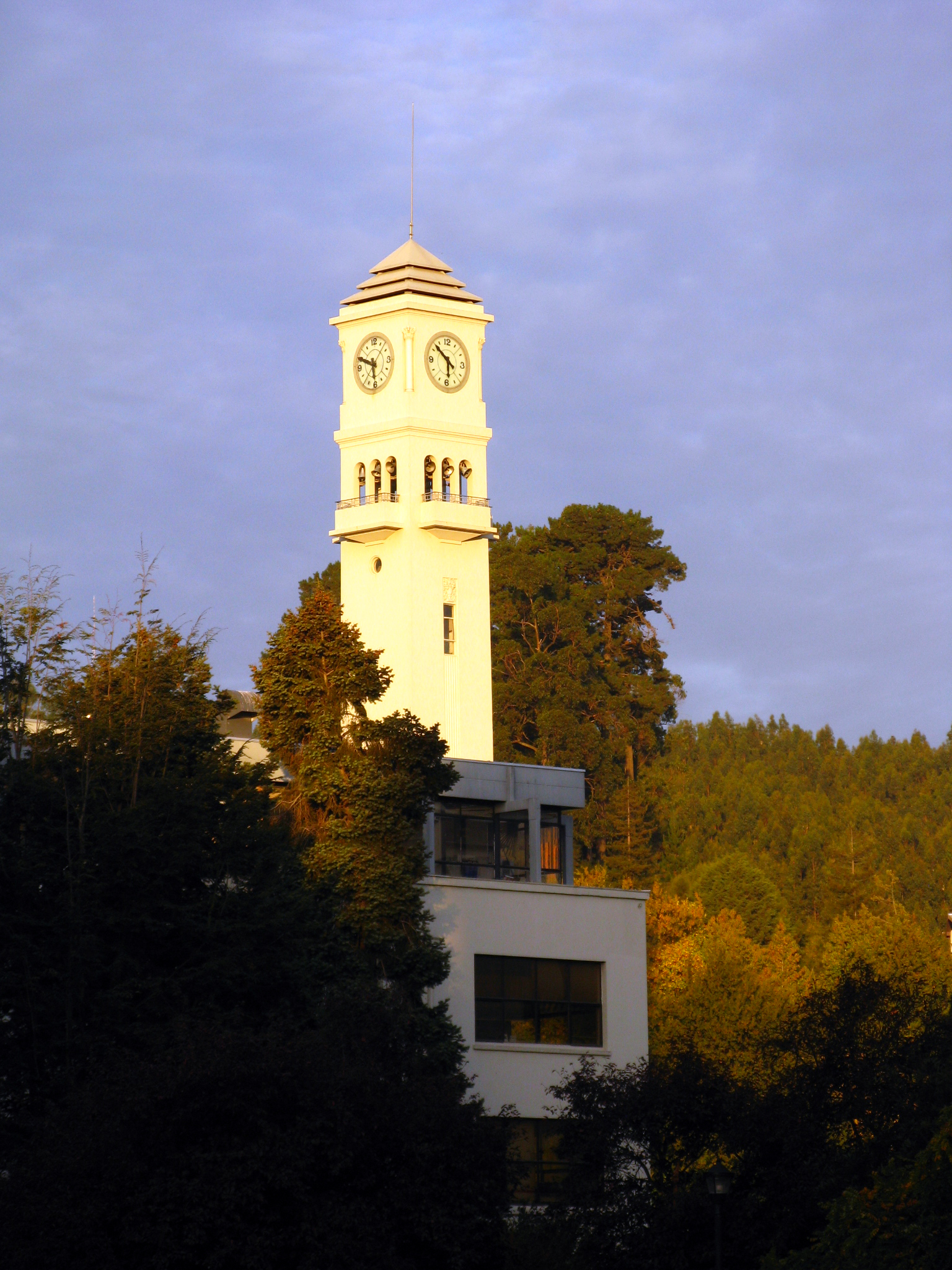
The campanile of the Universidad de Concepción

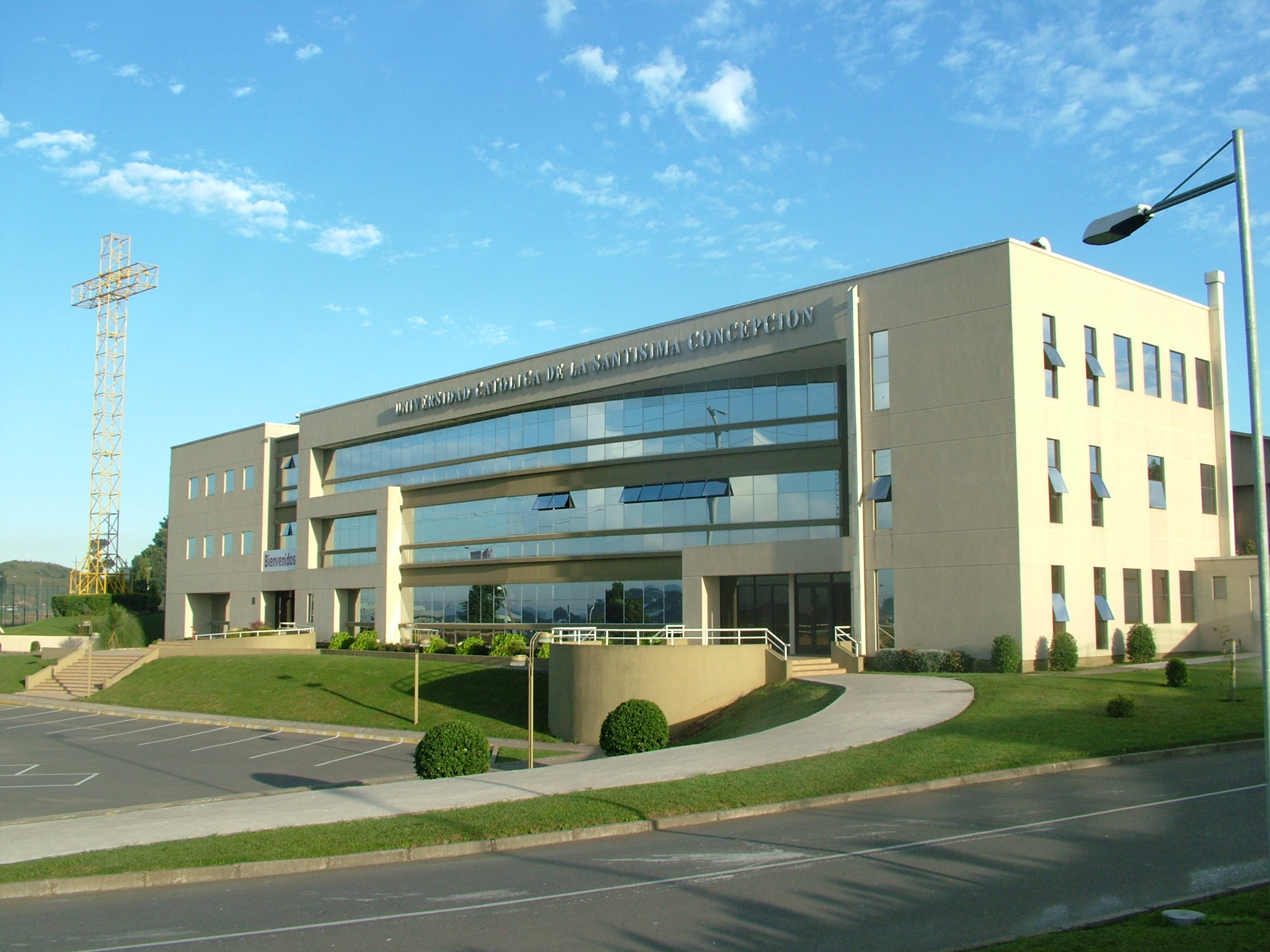
Universidad Católica de la Santísima Concepción

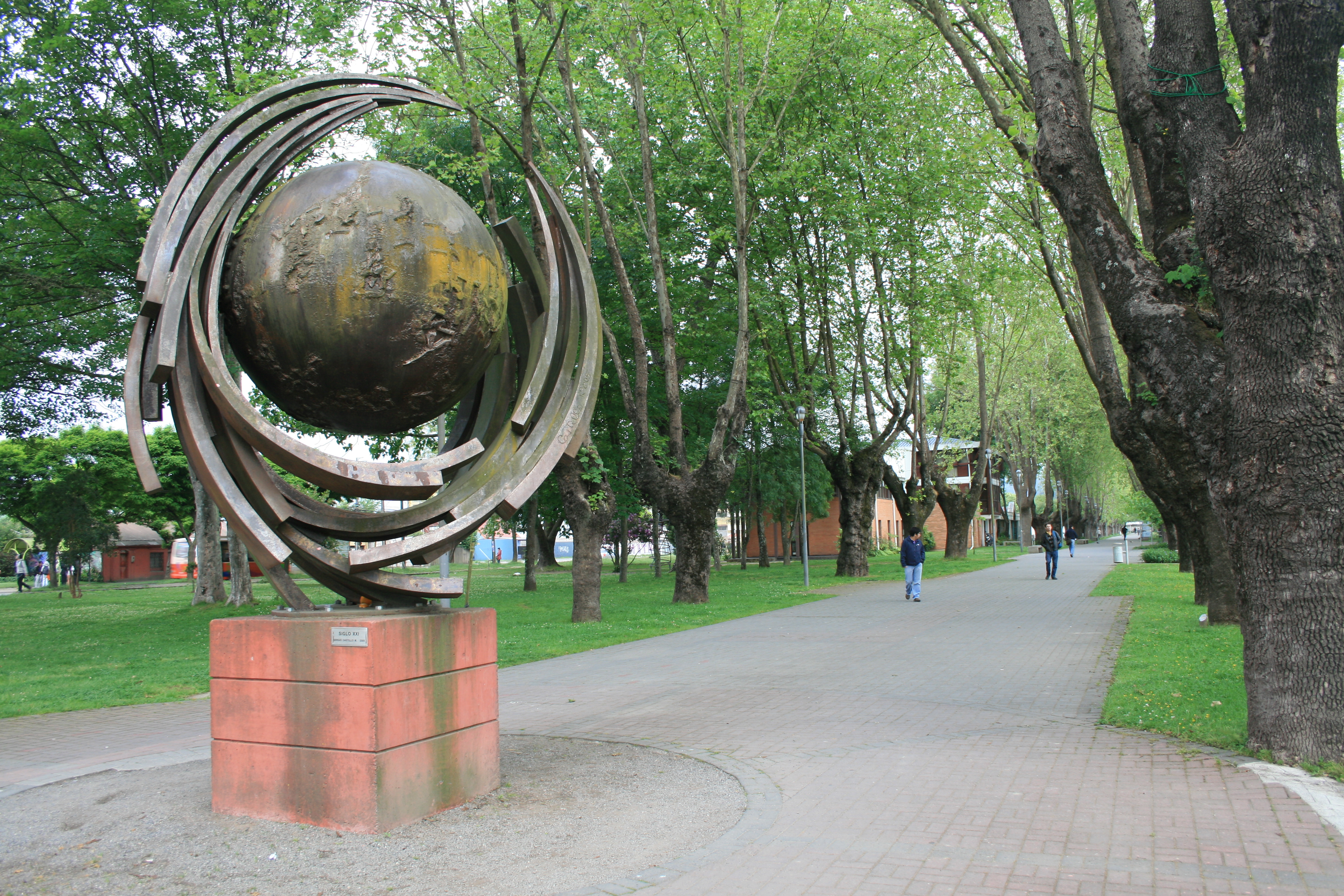
Siglo XXI at the University of the Bío Bío

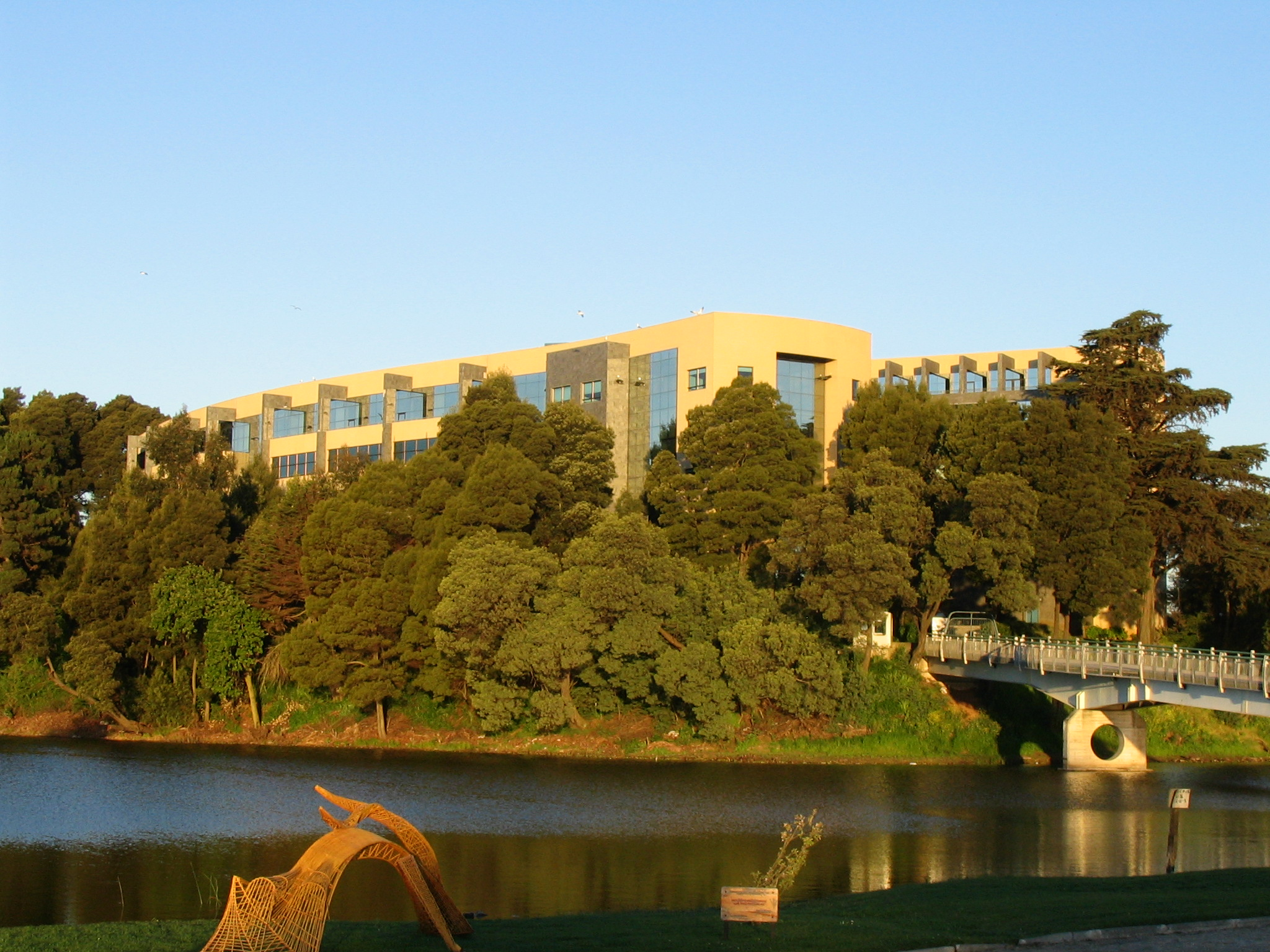
The Universidad San Sebastián, Concepción headquarters, located at the Laguna Las Tres Pascualas

=== Universities ===
The University Pencopolitana whose name was Pontificia Universidad Pencopolitana de La Concepción (Pontifical Pencopolitana University of The Conception) was an old university founded through a decree of the Bishop of Concepción, delivered to the administration of the Society of Jesus which functioned between the years 1724 and 1767. On May 24, 1751, an earthquake followed by a tsunami, ravaged the city causing serious damage, including the destruction of the library of the university and all of its funds. As a product of the fury of the waters, a rich collection of texts of the governance of southern Chile were lost, which resulted in a disaster for the culture and collective memory of the city. Due to the natural disasters, it was decided to relocate the city to the called Valle de la Mocha, location where it is currently situated. Slowly the seminary was revived in the new location, in a period of decline in academic activity in Chilean monastic universities after the creation of the Universidad de San Felipe, yet some degrees continued to be granted before the Suppression of the Society of Jesus in 1767. The aforementioned University is considered to be the natural and legitimate predecessor of the Universidad Católica de la Santísima Concepción (UCSC), erected by the Archbishop of Concepción in 1991, from the Talcahuano Regional Headquarters of the Pontificia Universidad Católica de Chile.

The image of the Pontifical University of Concepción Pencopolitana, is still valid, for His Majesty King Juan Carlos I of Spain in his 1990 speech on the occasion of his inauguration as Doctor Honoris Causa in the University of Chile, in Santiago de Chile, said: "The work of the Pontifical University Pencopolitana should not be ignored, even before the creation of the University of San Felipe" (Juan Carlos's account fails to acknowledge the existence of San Felipe's predecessor, the Dominican Universidad de Santo Tomás de Aquino, from the sixteenth century in Santiago).

Meanwhile, the University of Chile allowed schools in the city to teach courses in law which allowed men to obtain a law degree. Among its students was Henry Urrutia Manzano, who decades later became president of the Supreme Court of Chile.

The Universidad de Concepción was created in 1919 by a group of citizens including Enrique Molina Garmendia, its first rector.

Eventually, the university began to receive state support, becoming part of the traditional universities, becoming one of the three most important universities in the country, and the most important at the regional level.

==== Traditional universities ====
- Universidad de Concepción
- Universidad del Bío-Bío
- Universidad Católica de la Santísima Concepción
- Universidad Técnica Federico Santa María

==== Private universities ====
- Universidad del Desarrollo
- Universidad Andrés Bello
- Universidad Arcis
- Universidad San Sebastián
- Universidad Santo Tomás
- University of the Pacific (Chile)
- Universidad de Las Américas
- Universidad Bolivariana
- Universidad Pedro de Valdivia
- Universidad La República
- Universidad de Aconcagua
- Universidad Tecnológica de Chile INACAP

=== Professional institutes ===
- Instituto Profesional DuocUC, of the Pontificia Universidad Católica de Chile
- Instituto Profesional Virginio Gómez, of the Universidad de Concepción
- Instituto Tecnológico, of the Universidad Católica de la Santísima Concepción
- Instituto Profesional Santo Tomás, of the Universidad Santo Tomás
- Instituto Profesional AIEP, of the Universidad Andrés Bello
- Instituto Profesional La Araucana
- Instituto Profesional Providencia
- Instituto de Estudios Bancarios Guillermo Subercaseaux
- Instituto Profesional Diego Portales
- Instituto Profesional Crecic
- Instituto Profesional Placex
- Instituto Profesional INACAP

=== Primary and secondary schools ===
The city has a French international school, the Lycée Français Charles de Gaulle and a German school, the Colegio Alemán de Concepción, and two British schools, the Saint John's School and the Wessex School. The French school is located in the city downtown, the Wessex in Concepcion (nearer to Penco) and the German school and the Saint John's both in the San Pedro de la Paz area.

The defunct Concepción College was a parochial girls' day school and boarding school, established in 1878 by the Methodist Episcopal Church.

- Liceo Comercial Femenino Concepción

== International Relations ==
The city of Concepción hosts several international relations institutions, such as the Regional Unit of International Affairs (URAI) of the Regional Government of Biobío, responsible for analyzing and managing the region's bilateral and multilateral relations with Latin America and the rest of the world; the International Relations Commission of the Biobío Regional Council; and the regional office of the General Directorate for Export Promotion (ProChile).

=== Migration Management ===
In the area of international relations and migration management, the main actors in Concepción are the regional office of the National Migration Service, the Migration and International Police Department of the Investigations Police of Chile, and the Migrant Office of the Municipality of Concepción.

=== Internationalization in Higher Education ===
In the field of international relations and higher education, the main actors in Concepción include the Directorate of International Relations and the Center for European Studies (CEE) of the University of Concepción, the General Directorate of Institutional Relations of the University of Bío-Bío, the Directorate of International Relations of the Concepción campus of the University of Development, and both the International Relations Unit of the Directorate of Outreach and Institutional Relations and the Asia-Pacific Studies and Development Center (CEDAP) of the Catholic University of the Most Holy Conception.

=== Consulates ===
- Argentina (Consulate)
- Belgium (Honorary Consulate)
- Canada (Honorary Consulate)
- Ecuador (Honorary Consulate)
- Spain (Honorary Consulate)
- Finland (Honorary Consulate)
- France (Honorary Consulate)
- Hungary (Honorary Consulate)
- Italy (Honorary Consulate)
- Mexico (Honorary Consulate)
- Netherlands (Honorary Consulate)
- Poland (Honorary Consulate)

=== Twin towns – sister cities ===
Concepción's sister cities are:

- Bethlehem, Palestine (2006)
- (Brazil) Campinas, Brasil (1979)
- Cascavel, Brazil (2006)
- Guayaquil, Ecuador (2006)
- Medellín, Colombia (1998)
- Monterrey, Mexico (1997)
- Nanjing, China (2018)
- La Plata, Argentina (1993)
- San Miguel de Tucumán, Argentina (2013)
- Wuhan, China (2014)

== Notable citizens ==
- Marlene Ahrens, athlete (1933–2020)
- Santiago Manuel de Alday y Aspée, Bishop of Santiago between 1755 and 1788 (1712–1789)
- Patricio Almendra, footballer (b. 1977)
- Luis Altamirano, President of the 1924 Government Junta of Chile (1867–1938)
- Graciela Araya, opera singer (b. 1962)
- Miguel Ardiman, footballer (b. 1967)
- Enrique Soro Barriga, composer (1884–1954)
- Diego José Benavente, President of the Senate of Chile (1790–1867)
- Manuel Bulnes, President of Chile between 1841 and 1851 (1799–1866)
- Roberto Cartes, footballer (b. 1972)
- Arturo del Castillo, comic book artist (1925–1992)
- Bélgica Castro, actress (1921–2020)
- Delfina de la Cruz, pianist and First Lady of Chile (1837–1905)
- José María de la Cruz, soldier (1799–1875)
- De Saloon, pop and rock band
- Francisco Encina, President of the Chamber of Deputies of Chile (b. 1943)
- Edgardo Enríquez, Minister of Education of Chile (1912–1996)
- Miguel Enríquez, physician and politician (1944–1974)
- Luis Pedro Figueroa, footballer (b. 1983)
- Alfredo France, footballer (1895–1938)
- Adrián García, tennis player (b. 1978)
- Enrique Molina Garmendia, founder of the University of Concepción, one of the top universities in Chile (1871–1964)
- Gonzalo Garrido, road bicycle racer (b. 1973)
- José Goñi, Minister of National Defense of Chile (b. 1948)
- Osvaldo González, footballer (b. 1984)
- Viviana Guzmán, flutist and composer (b. 1964)
- Isidora Jiménez, athlete (b. 1993)
- Klaus Junge, chess master (1924–1945)
- Los Bunkers, alternative rock band
- Los Tres, rock band
- Ignacio Urrutia Manzano, politician (1879–1951)
- Mandolino, singer and comedian (1934–2014)
- Adelqui Migliar, film actor, director, writer and producer (1891–1956)
- Carla Muñoz, racquetball player (b. 1992)
- Tomás Pablo Elorza, President of the Senate of Chile (1921–1999)
- Rodrigo Peñailillo, Minister of the Interior of Chile (b. 1973)
- Pepo, cartoonist (1911–2000)
- José Joaquín Prieto, President of Chile between 1831 and 1841 (1786–1854)
- Raimundo Rebolledo, footballer (b. 1997)
- Cristián Reyes, sprinter (b. 1986)
- Ximena Rincón, President of the Senate of Chile (b. 1968)
- Arturo Sanhueza, footballer (b. 1979)
- Waldo Sanhueza, football manager and president of Colo-Colo (1900–1966)
- José A. Santos, retired American jockey (b. 1961)
- René Schneider, commander-in-chief of the Chilean Army (1913–1970)
- Sebastián Sepúlveda, screenwriter, film producer and director (b. 1972)
- Ricardo Soto, recurve archer (b. 1999)
- Cristián Uribe, footballer (b. 1976)
- José Francisco Urrejola, President of the Senate of Chile (1911–2004)
- Ignacio Urrutia Manzano, President of the Senate of Chile (1879–1951)
- René Valenzuela, footballer (b. 1955)
- Paulina Veloso, lawyer and Socialist Party politician (b. 1957)
- Luis Vera, footballer (1929–2014)
- Juan de Dios Vial del Río, President of the Senate of Chile (1774–1850)
- Gustavo Viveros, footballer (b. 1947)
- Elena Waiss, pianist (1908–1988)
- Aníbal Zañartu, politician (1847–1902)
- Miguel de Zañartu, lawyer and politician, signatory of the Chilean Declaration of Independence (1786–1851)

== Gallery ==
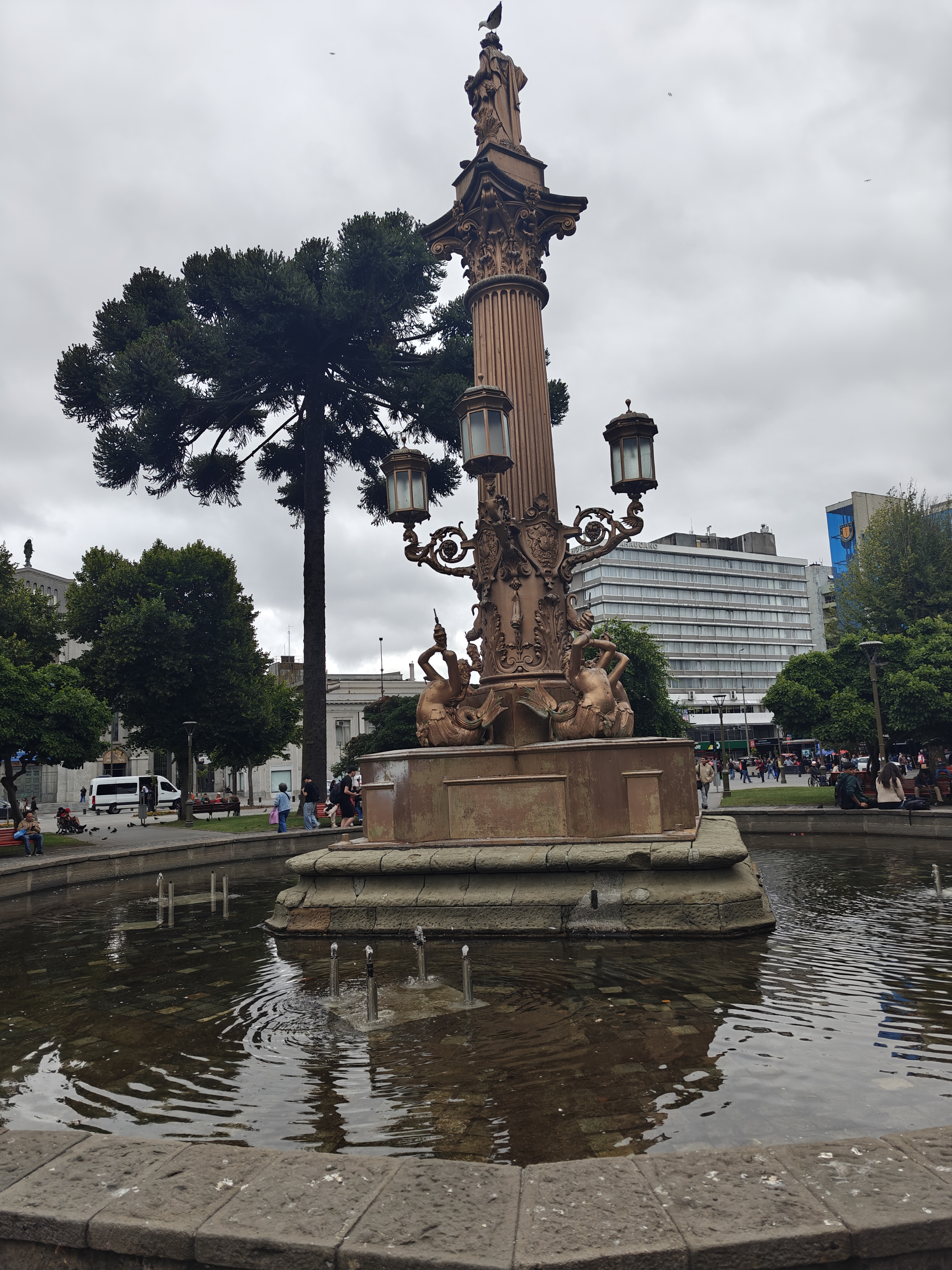
Fuente Alemana, one of city's notable landmarks

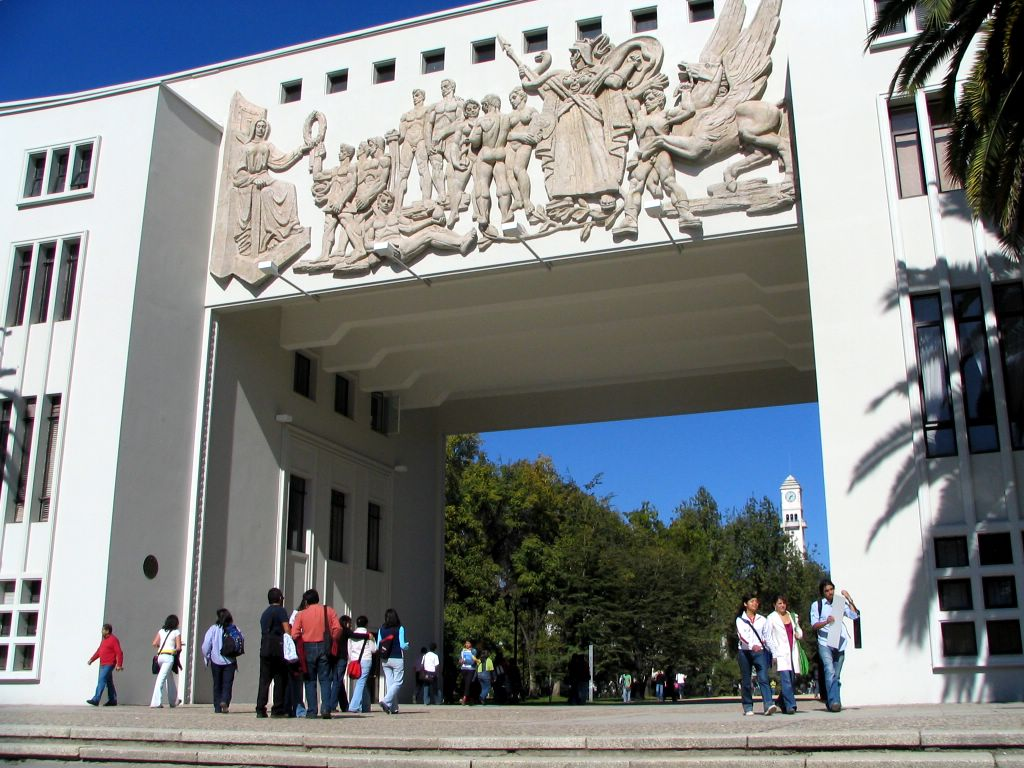
Arch of the Faculty of Medicine University of Concepción

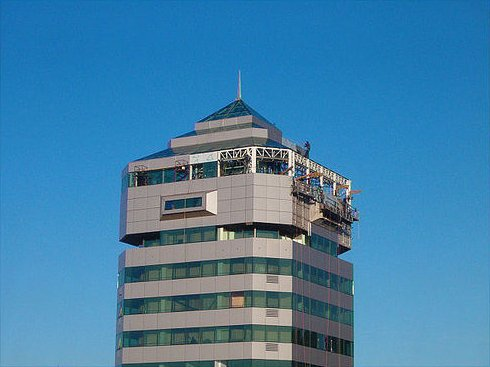
Caja Los Andes Building in downtown Concepción

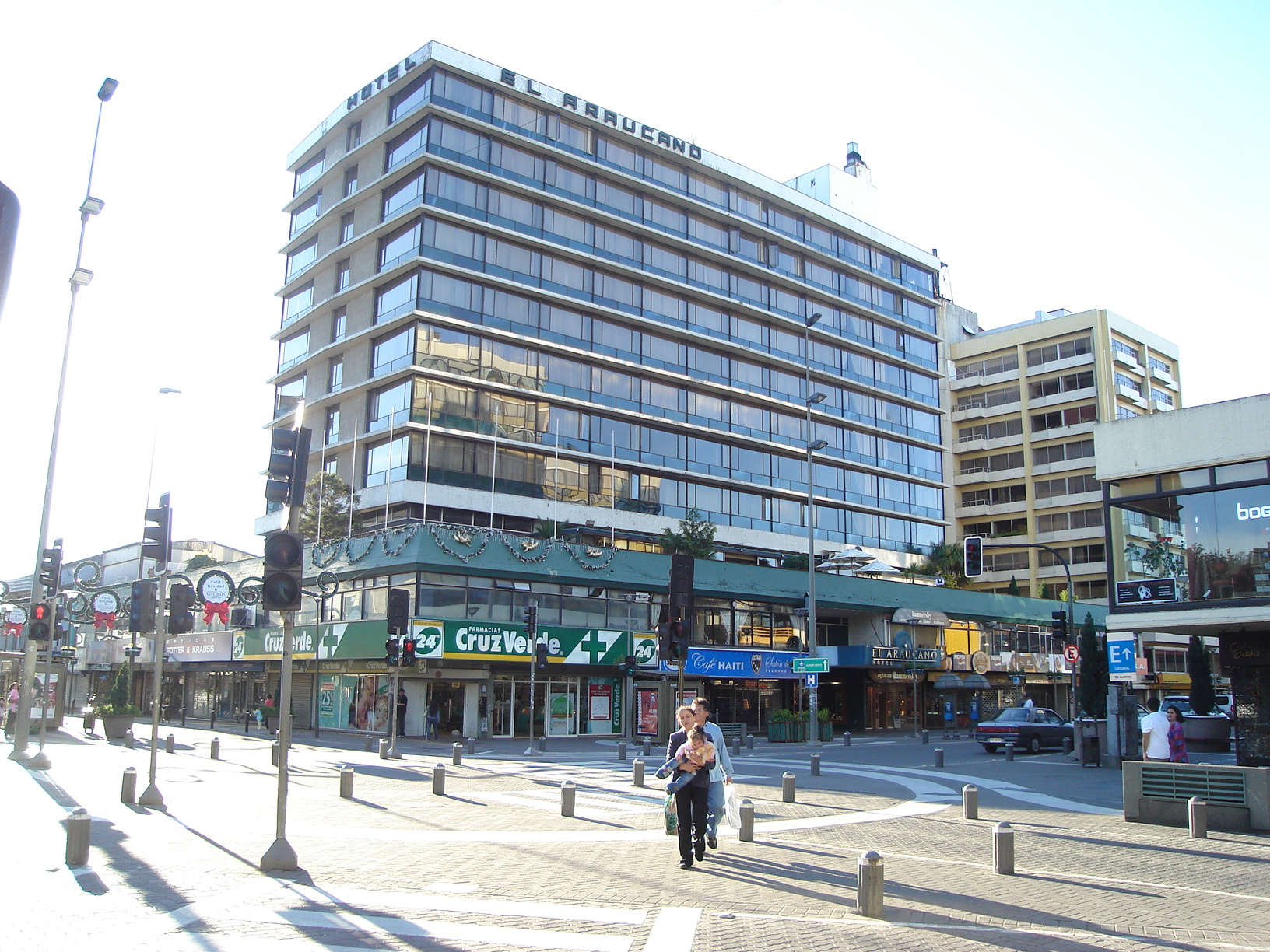
The hotel Araucano of Concepción in the center of the city

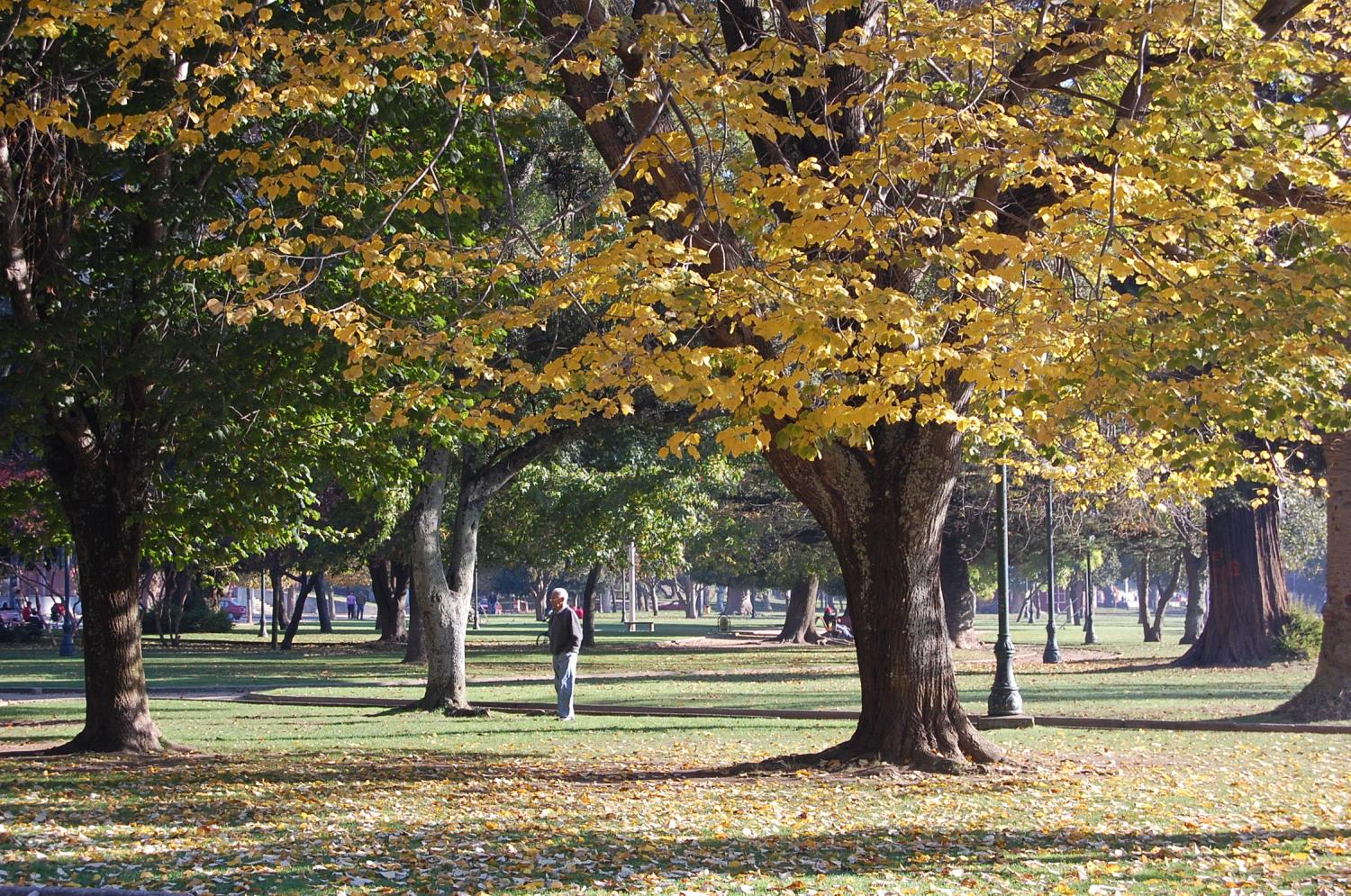
View of Ecuador Park, on the slopes of Cerro Caracol

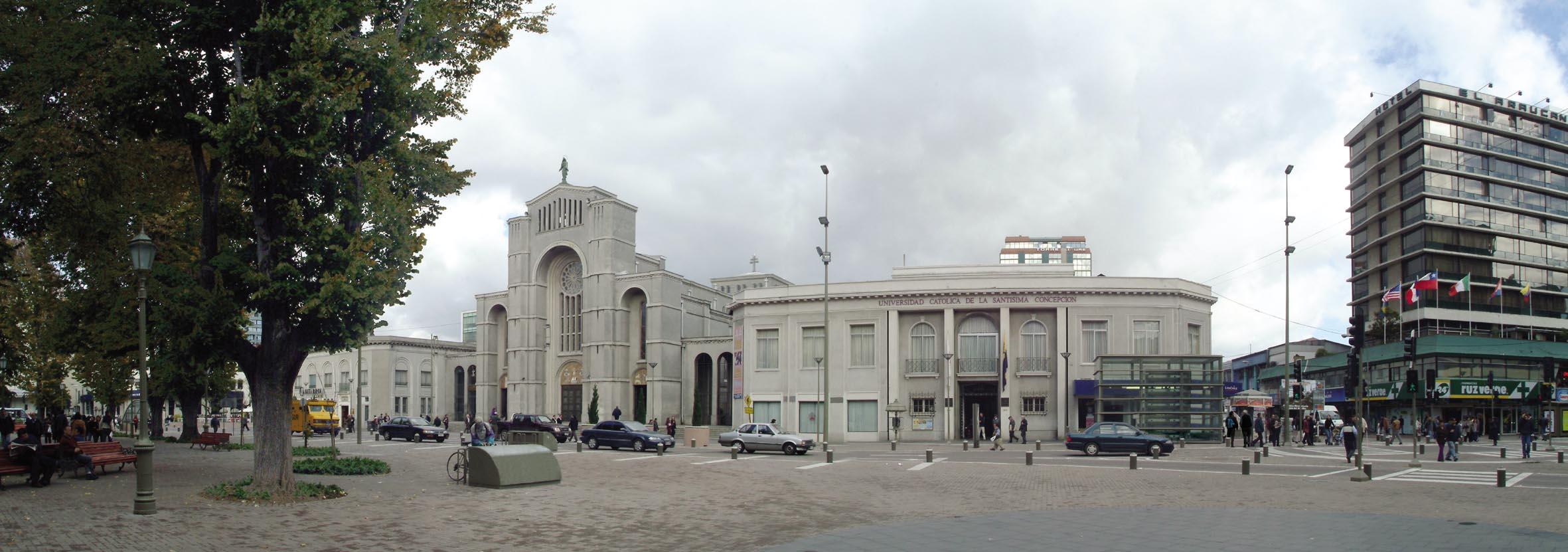
The Concepción Cathedral from the Plaza de la Independencia

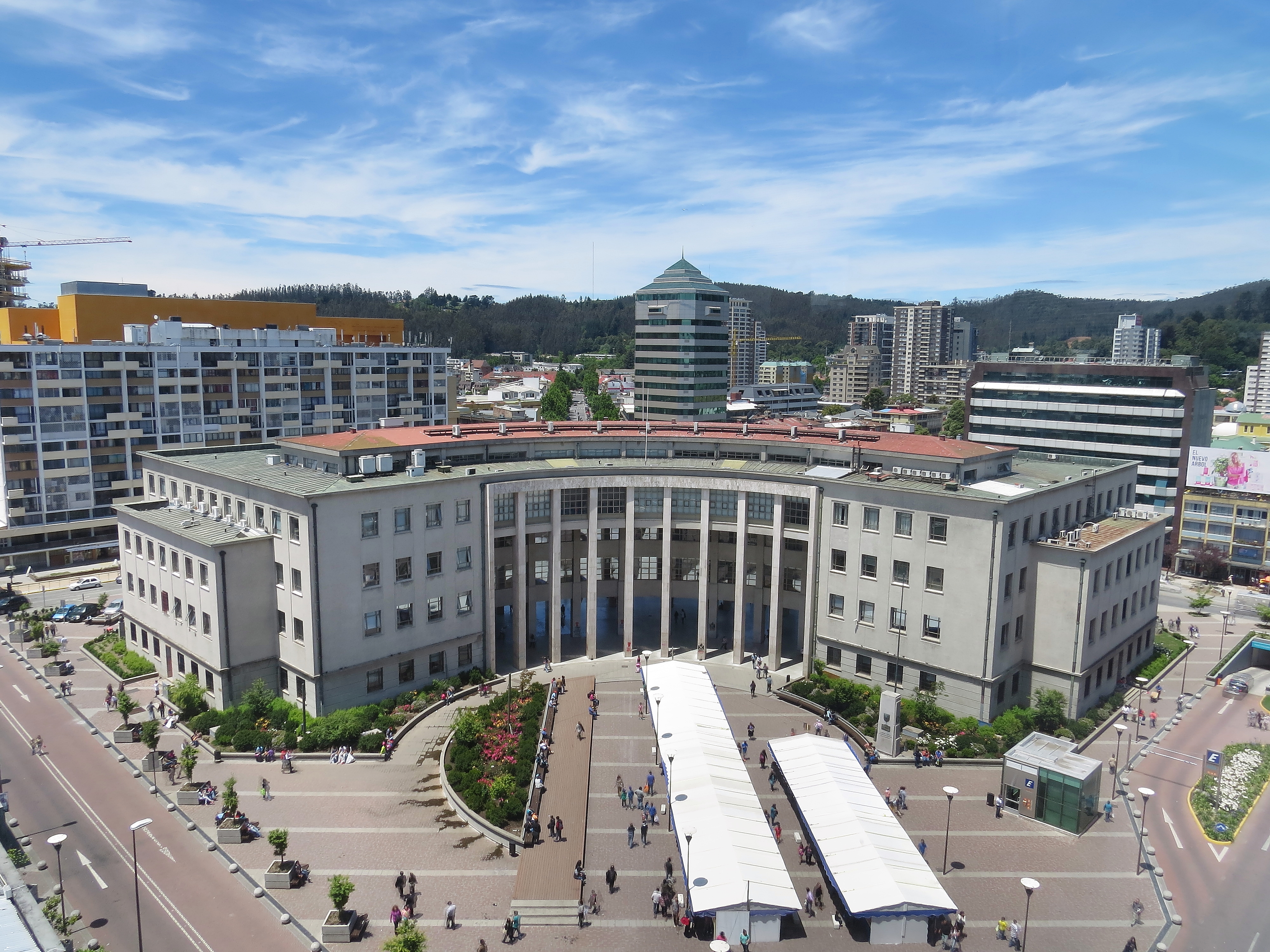
Palace of the Court of Appeals of Concepción

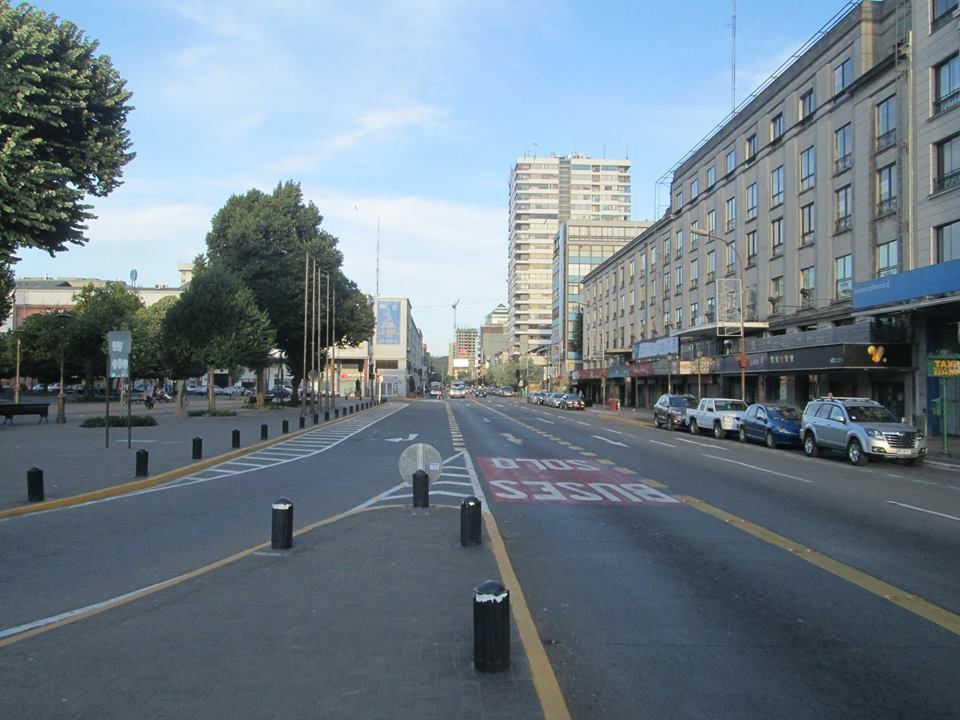
The avenue O'Higgins

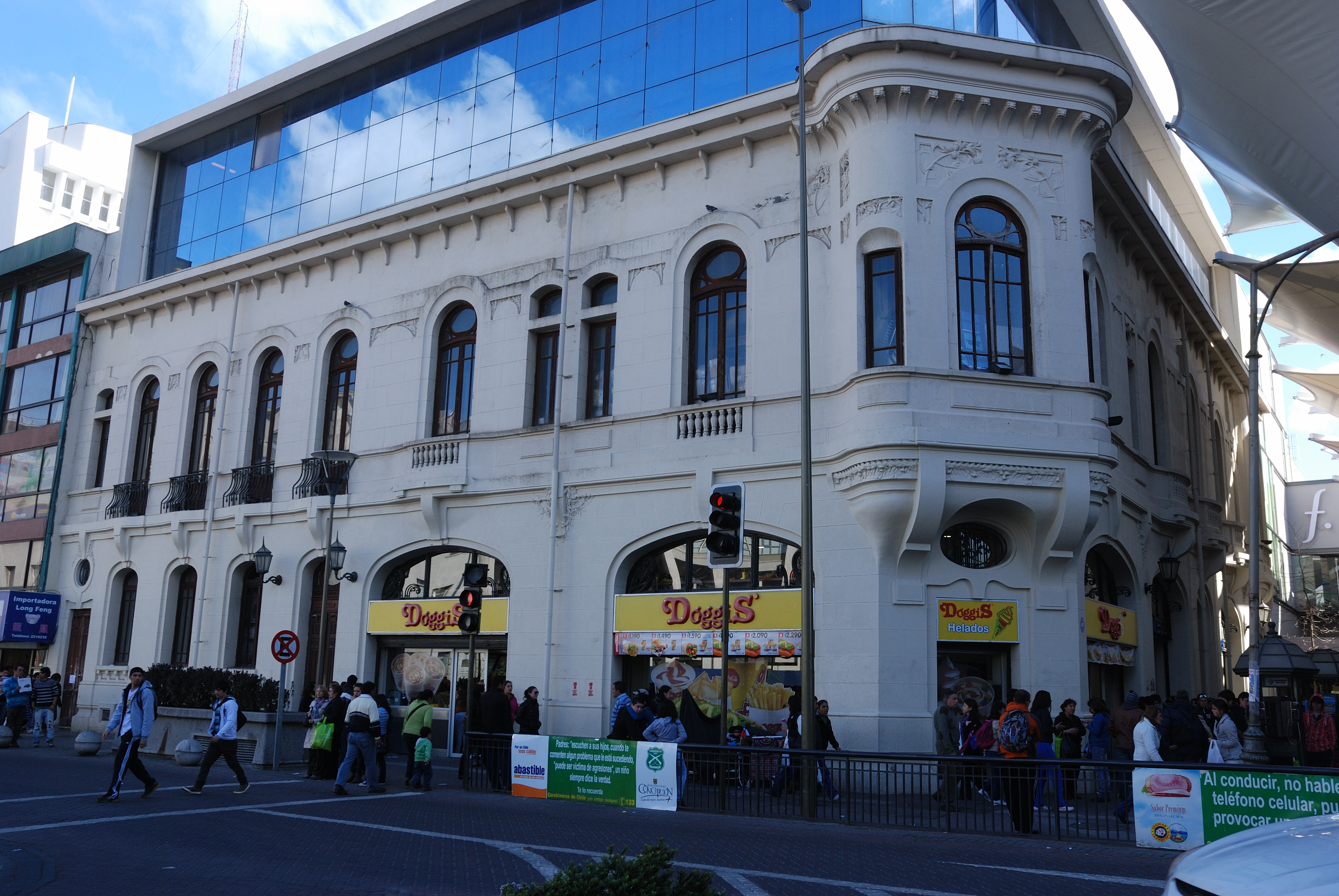
Casa de Pedro del Río

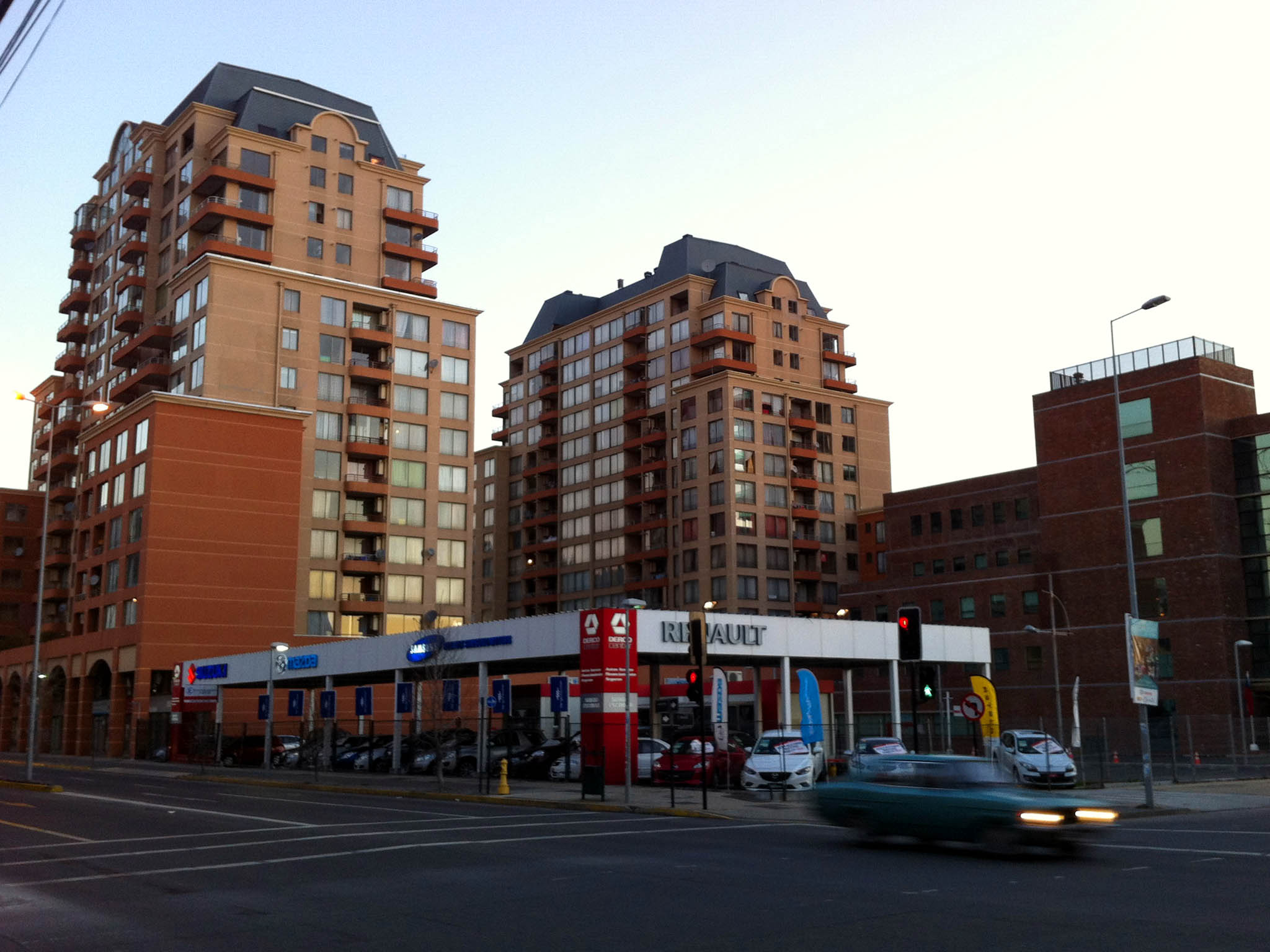
Buildings in Concepción

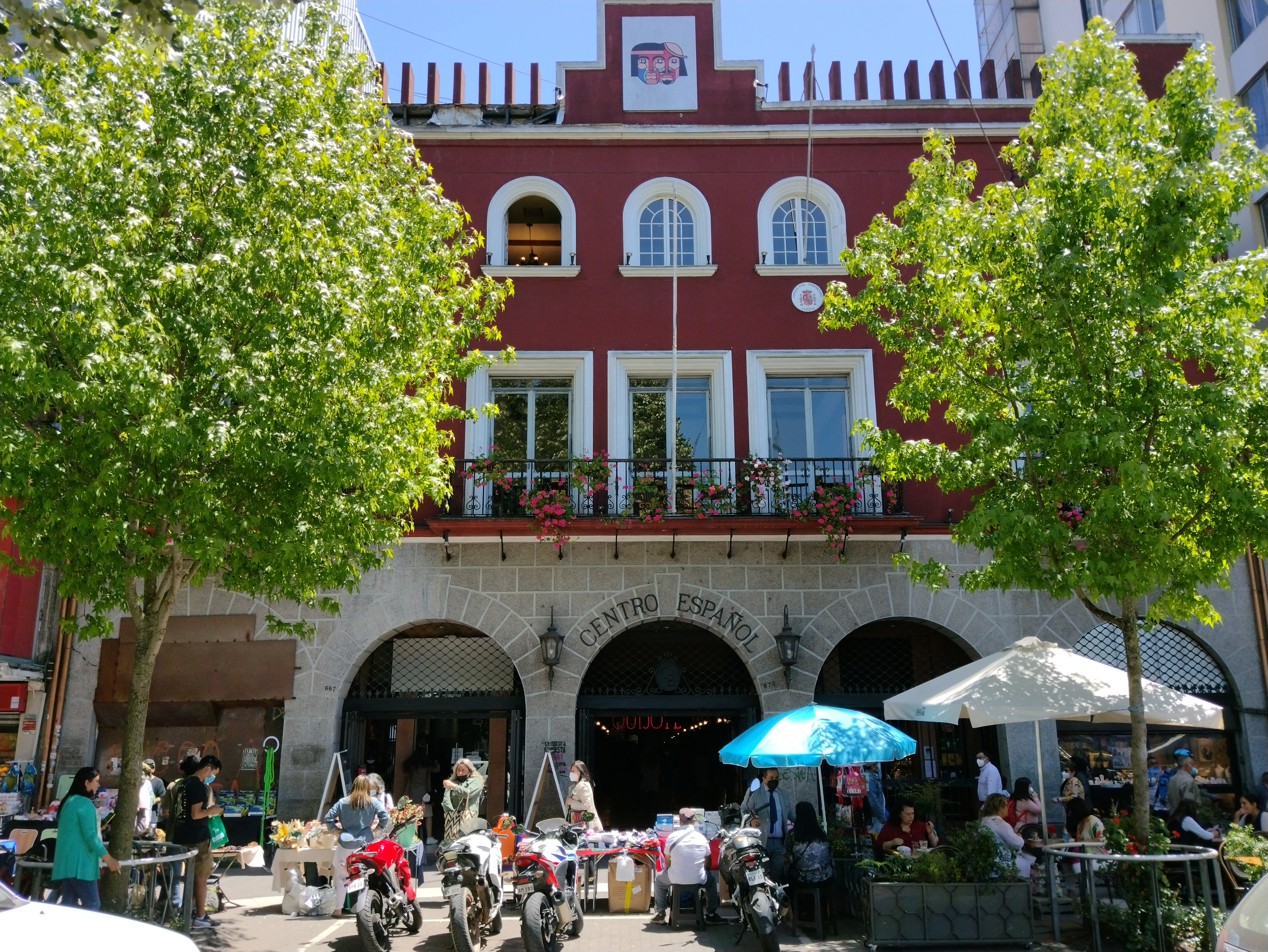
Spanish Center

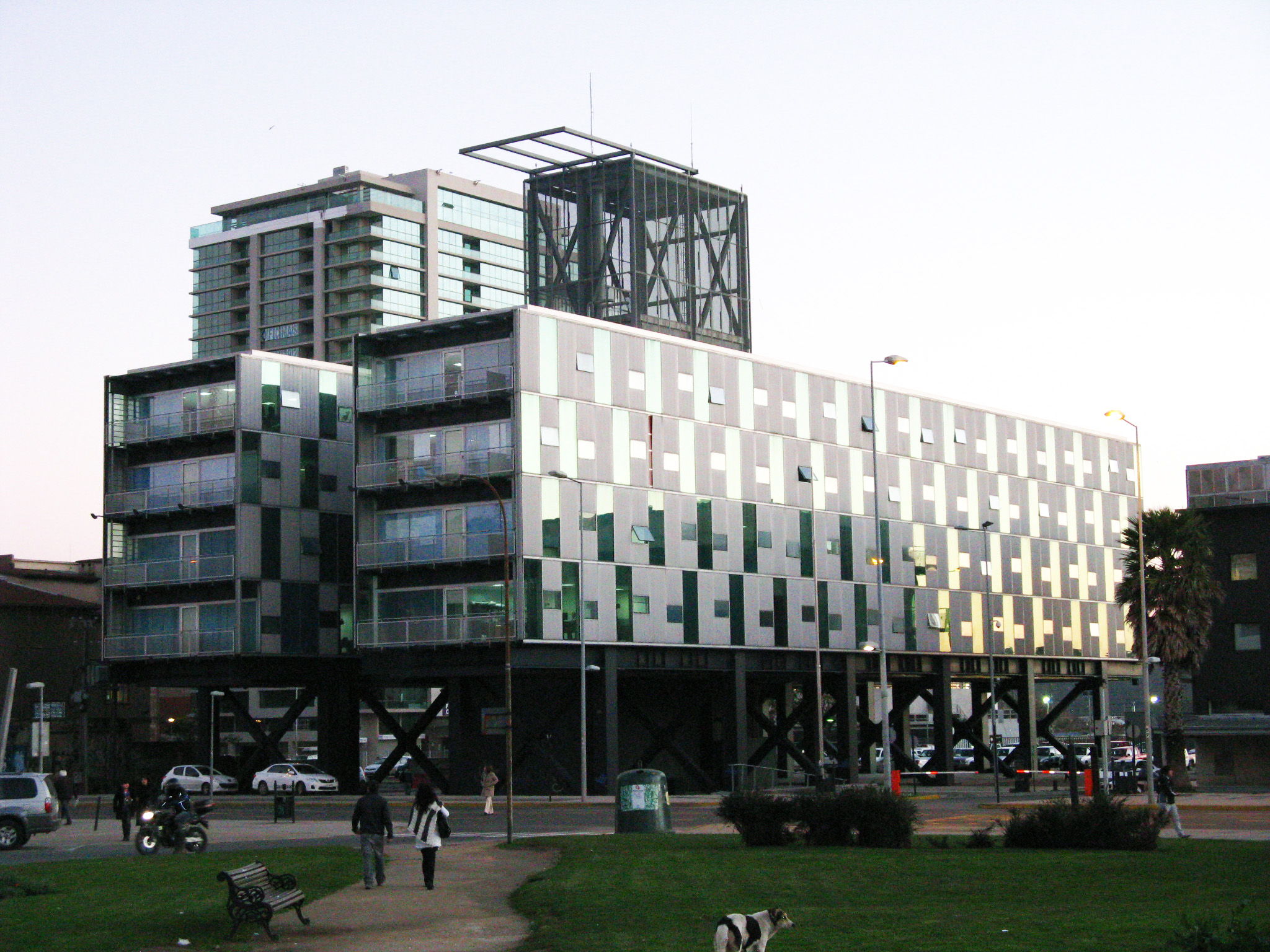
Civic center

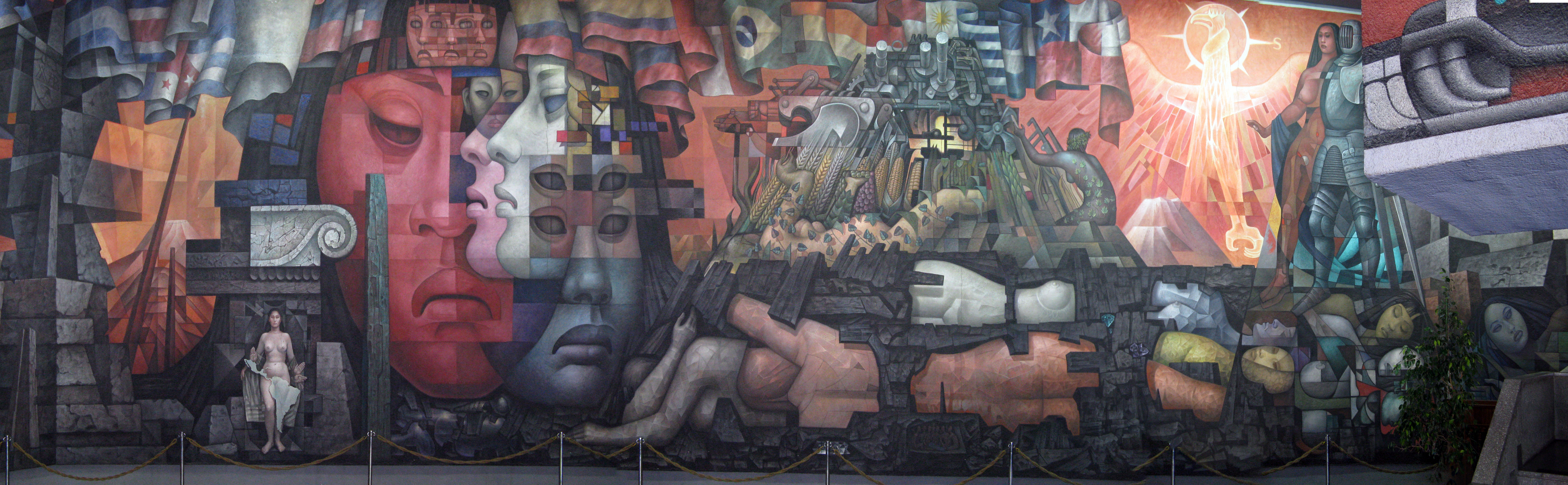
Presencia de América Latina, mural declared national monument of Chile

== See also ==
- Greater Concepción
- Biobío Region
- Santa Juana
- Florida
- Dichato
- Biobío River
