= Liceo Comercial Femenino Concepción =

Educational institution in Chile

Liceo Comercial Femenino de Concepción
- Founded
- Type: High school
- Location: Heras # 335, Concepción, Chile
- Coordinates: 36.8237°S 73.0569°W
- Key people: Juan Hernandez Caldera (Director)
- Endowment: Private subsidized
- Website: corporacionestudio.cl/index.php?lugar=lcfc

Liceo Comercial Femenino de Concepción (Commercial High School for Girls) is an educational institution, located in Concepción, Chile.

== General ==
Within it is the Liceo Comercial Female (INCOFE), which is oriented 12345 to the sector of Administration and Commerce, giving the following fields: Administration, Accounting and Secretarial.

== Staff ==
(Directory Teaching INCOFE)

- General Manager of the Corporation study, Training, Employment chamber production and trade of Conception: Andreina Borzone Tassara
- Academic Director: Sherry Silvia Sepulveda
- Inspector General: Violet Bennett Olavarria
- Head, Race: Lacoste Maria Puga
- Chief Administrative Officer: Luis Figueroa Retamal
