= Catholic University of the Most Holy Conception =

University in Chile

Coordinates: 36°49′35″S 73°03′04″W

Universidad Católica de la Santísima Concepción
- Universidad Católica de la Santísima Concepción
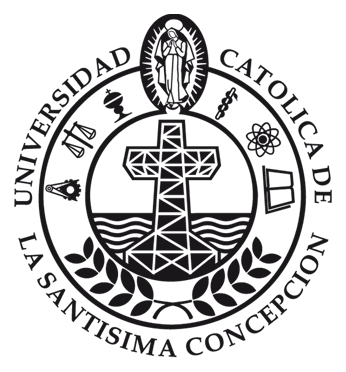
- Type: Private
- Established: July 10th, 1991
- Affiliations: Catholic
- Academic affiliations: Chilean Traditional Universities
- Chancellor: Fernando Chomali
- Rector: Christian Schmitz Vaccaro
- Students: 14,447 (2020)
- Undergraduates: 14,138
- Postgraduates: 309
- Location: Concepción, Chile
- Website: www.ucsc.cl

The Universidad Católica de la Santísima Concepción, translated into English as "Catholic University of the Most Immaculate Conception", is a private catholic university in the city of Concepción, Chile.

== History ==
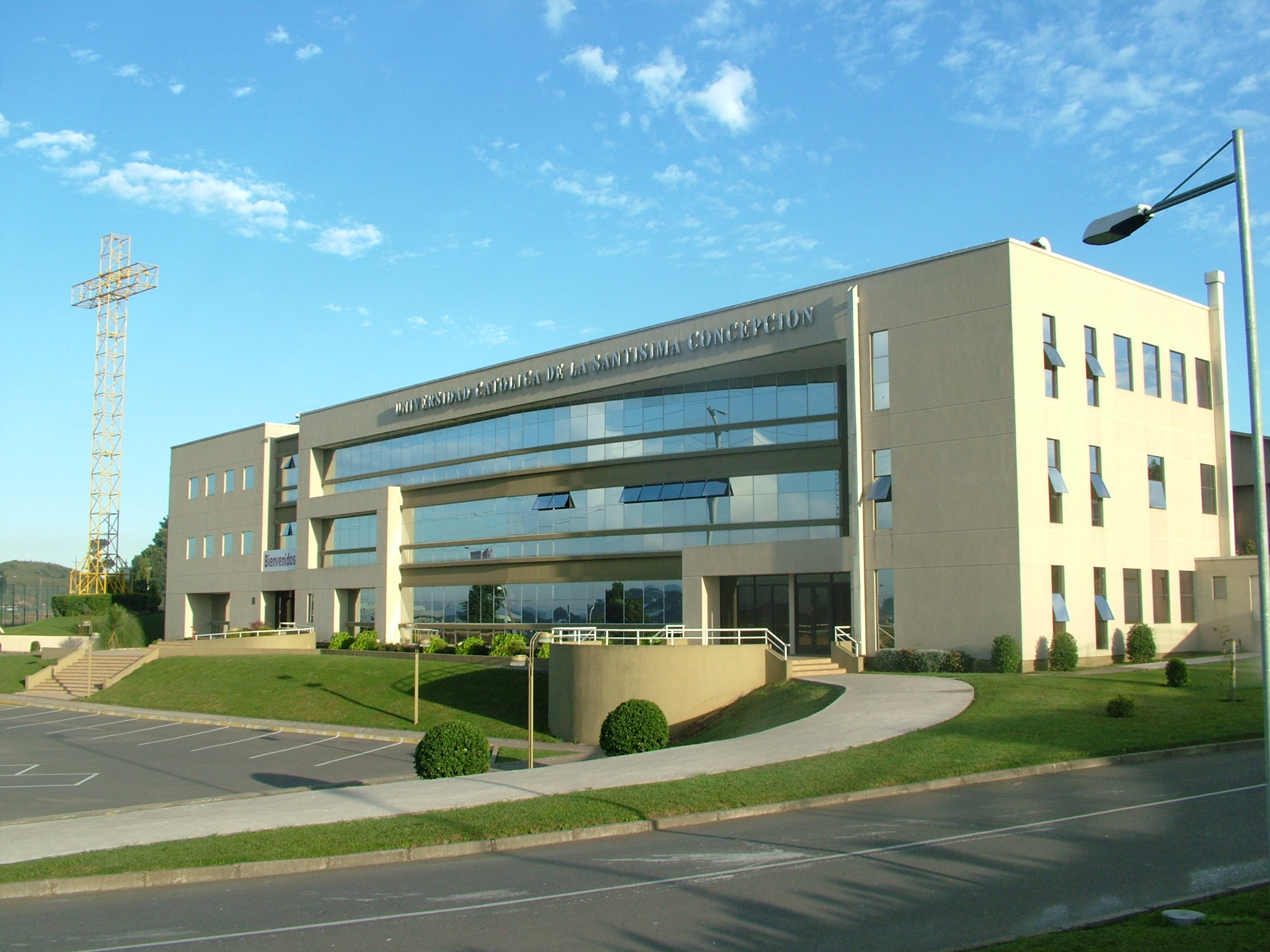

The Universidad Católica de la Santísima Concepción was founded on July 10, 1991, by ordinance of the bishop of the Archdiocese of the Santísima Concepción, Monsignor Antonio Moreno Casamitjana. The regional branch campus of the Pontificia Universidad Católica de Chile in Talcahuano provided the foundation for the new university.

The university is a legally autonomous, partially state-supported, private entity. It is a member of the Council of Rectors of Chilean Universities, or Council of Rectors of Chilean Universities (Cruch), which is a network of public and private universities whose general function is to coordinate the country's university work, and of the Chilean Chapter of Catholic Universities and the International Federation of Catholic Universities (FIUC).

The Universidad Católica de la Santísima Concepción consists of seven faculties (Law, Science, Education, Engineering, Medicine, Business Management and Communications, History and Social Sciences), an Institute of Theology, and a Technological Institute, with undergraduate and graduate-level courses.

Although the university has branches in the cities of Chillán, Los Angeles, and Cañete, its main campus and administrative offices are located in the city of Concepción.

== Notable alumni ==
- Frank Sauerbaum, ex deputy.
- Gonzalo Osses, poet and writer.
- Alejandro Navarro, politician, current senator.
- Marcelo Chávez, current deputy.
