= List of serial killers in Chile =

Chile has had multiple serial killers, coming from different regions and backgrounds and with different motivations. Below is a list of Chileans that have committed three or more verifiable murders. The vast majority of these individuals were or are being held in prison where they are serving life sentences, while others were sentenced to death, before its abolition, by firing squad.

Not listed below are various military and police members active during the military dictatorship of Chile active from 1973 until 1990 who were convicted of multiple murders and tortures (such as Álvaro Corbalán and Miguel Krassnoff).

== Identified serial killers ==
Name	Nickname	Years active	Victims	Status	Notes
Catalina de los Ríos y Lisperguer	"The Quintrala"	1622–1660	40+	Died in 1665	Member of high-class Spaniards, with her maternal grandfather being García Hurtado de Mendoza. She killed an unknown number of her servants, often resorting to torture as a means of execution, and died while her trial was ongoing. Her figure has both been used as a feminist icon and as a symbol of Spanish brutality.
Pedro María Ñancúpel Alarcón	"Pirate Ñancúpel"	1857–1888	20+	Executed in 1888	Pirate from Chiloé of Huilliche origin. After being arrested, he was found guilty of around 200 crimes, including over 20 murders. Executed by firing squad in 1888.
Juan de Dios López	"King of Bandits"	1891–1903	16	Killed by prison guards in 1903	Serial robber responsible for 16 murders, 4 rapes and multiple other burglaries. López was shot dead by prison guards in 1903 during an escape attempt.
Louis-Amédée Brihier Lacroix	"Émile Dubois" or "Emilio Morales"	1905–1906	6 (2 outside of Chile)	Executed in 1907	French miner who murdered his girlfriend's father before fleeing to Peru and killing another person there. While in Chile, he killed another 4 victims before being caught. After being caught, he was sentenced to death via firing squad.
Juan de Dios Osorio Galdámez	"Che Galdámez"	1942–1943	3	Executed in 1945	Serial burglar from Santiago whose victims were usually homeless and drunk. In December 1942, he killed the owner of a parcel in Conchalí. While on the run, he killed another parcel owner and his wife in January 1943. After being caught, he was feared by his own cellmates due to his extreme aggression. He was executed by firing squad on 19 August 1945.
René Cerón Pardo	"The Fury"	1943–1965	7	Unknown	Murdered 4 people, mostly in acts of revenge, such as killing a man for making indecent suggestions to his partner. Between 1956 and 1958, was subject to various brain operations, including a lobotomy, in order to be granted parole. After this, he spent 5 years living in peace before murdering again.
Alberto Hipómenes Caldera García	"Tucho Caldera"	1947 and earlier	3	Executed in 1951	While on parole for an earlier double murder, he killed his son-in-law in San Felipe in 1947. He was sentenced to death. His case, and the investigation that followed, led to the creation of the Homicide Brigade in the Investigations Police of Chile.
José Misael Roldán Concha	"The Jackal of Pupunahue"	1954, 1957	7	Died in prison	Miner who, while on parole for an earlier murder, killed a woman and five out of her seven children. After being identified by a surviving child as the killer, he was sentenced to death, but this was nullified by a pardon issued by then-president Carlos Ibáñez del Campo.
María Teresa Alfaro Hidalgo	"Tete" or "The Diabolical Nanny"	1960–1962	4	Freed in 1975	Nanny who murdered three of the children of the couple she worked for along with the wife's mother. Was originally sentenced to death via firing squad, but her sentence was later reduced to 19 years of prison. Was freed under parole after 10 years.
Lucinda Eliana Goldberg Fuentes	"The Poisoner of Concepción"	1966–1971	3	Committed suicide before capture	Nurse and single mother who killed three people via poisoning to ensure her adoptive son's well-being, but accidentally poisoned him among the other two victims. After committing suicide via the same method in 1971, she left a letter detailing her criminal actions. According to her close friends, she suffered from delusions revolving around being prosecuted, possibly schizophrenia.
Manuel Segundo Tapia Vargas	"Crazy Manuel"	1968–1969	3	Unknown	Responsible for three homicides occurred between 1968 and 1969, two of which were of ex-policemen. Sentenced to 20 years imprisonment.
Juan Domingo Salvo Zúñiga	"The Jackal of Alcohuaz"	1975, 1990	5	Imprisoned for life	Killed his sister in 1975. After being freed in 1990, he killed his neighbor and her three children with an axe. Sentenced to life imprisonment.
Jorge José Sagredo Pizarro and Carlos Alberto Topp Collins	"The Psychopaths of Viña del Mar"	1980–1981	10	Executed in 1985	Both were policemen, they killed 10 victims and raped another four in Viña del Mar. They were the last people in Chile to be executed, as the practice was outlawed in 2001.
Erasmo Antonio Moena Pinto	"The Psychopath of Placilla"	1991, 2010	3+	Imprisoned, set for release in 2071	Killed his partner, a barber, in 1991, but was not prosecuted due to the body never being found. He later killed two women while posing as an employer in 2010.
Ramón Francisco Pardo Valenzuela and Jacqueline del Carmen López González	"The Infanticides of Colina"	1994–2001	7	Freed in 2013	A couple made up of a stepfather and stepdaughter who procreated 7 times. To hide these pregnancies, they killed each one of the babies as they were being born. Police were not able to find out whether the newborns were breathing at the time of death, for which they were prosecuted under the charges of abortion (illegal in the country).
Hugo Humberto Bustamante Pérez	"The Drum Killer"	1996–2020	5	Imprisoned for life	After a double murder in 2005, he hid the remains in a concrete drum. He was freed in 2018 under parole, and was later arrested again for murdering a teenage girl. In 2024, he confessed to a previously unknown double murder committed in 1996.
Rubén Darío Millatureo Vargas	"The Jackal of Queilén"	1997–1998	3–6	Paroled in 2018	Following his mother's death, he killed his father with an axe after an argument. He later killed a salesman who he owed money to, then killed his workplace's secretary. His friends later went into his house, where they found the latter's corpse. Although originally sentenced to death, the practice stopped in 2001, transferring his penalty to a life sentence. He was later freed under parole in 2018.
Julio Segundo Pérez Silva	"The Psychopath of Alto Hospicio"	1998–2001	14–19	Imprisoned for life	Taximan who raped and killed at least 14 women and girls in the northern Tarapacá Region. Also a person of interest in another five disappearances.
Jorge Antonio Fuentealba Plaza	"Ñoco" or "The Jackal of Curicó"	2004–2012	5	Imprisoned for life	His first crime occurred in 2004, when he was only 17 years old, when he murdered his homosexual partner. In 2011, he was on parole when he committed a homicide in Curicó, finally ending his criminal career with a triple homicide in 2012, in which he ended the life of his step-grandfather and two witnesses to the crime.
María del Pilar Pérez López and José Mario Ruz Restrepo	"The Quintrala of Seminario"	2008	3	Imprisoned for life	Pérez hired Ruz, a hitman, to kill her husband, who came out as a homosexual and left her for a man, in 2008. After this, she hired him again to kill multiple members of her family to inherit various properties. She still claims to be innocent to this day.
Adalio Enrique Mansilla Quinchamán	"The Dismemberer of Punta Arenas"	2009–2023	3	Imprisoned for life	In 2009, still a minor at the time, Mansilla was imprisoned after a murder. In 2015, he killed a man who intervened in an argument with his girlfriend (who was also attacked, but survived). In 2023, he killed another man and dismembered him, for which he was sentenced to life imprisonment.
Hugo Paolo Pastén Espinoza	"The Psychopath of Copiapó"	2019	3	Imprisoned for life	After being freed under parole for a 2005 rape conviction, he killed a teenage girl, a Bolivian immigrant, and a transgender rights activist, burning the latter's house down.
Diego Alexánder Ruiz Restrepo	"The Psychopath of Meiggs"	2020	7–27	Imprisoned for life	Illegal Colombian immigrant who killed a still-investigated number of homeless people throughout 2020.
Rodrigo Fernando de Jesús Castro Salas	"Rorro"	2018–2019	7	Imprisoned for life	Organized criminal; Responsible for two separate murders, one in July 2018 and one in February 2019, along with a mass shooting in a casino carried out in September 2019.
Luis Ignacio Vásquez Villenas	"Lucho Plátano"	2022–2023	5	Imprisoned, trial ongoing	Car robber and organized crime leader who killed 3 rival gangster's family members throughout 2022. When an Investigations Police of Chile member questioned him on the street in 2023, he shot and killed him before hiding in his partner's apartment. He was arrested on 8 February.
Unknown		2022–2023	3	Imprisoned, awaiting trial	In November 2022, a Colombian citizen allegedly committed a double homicide in Quinta Normal, killing a 27-year-old Colombian and a 17-year-old Ecuadorian. In May 2023, family members of the first two victims tracked down the killer to his home and tried to attack him, but he pulled out a firearm and shot multiple times, killing a 49-year-old Chilean. His identity has yet to be revealed.

== Disputed cases ==
Name	Nickname	Years active	Victims	Status	Notes
Ricardo Javier González Latorre	"The Lawyer of Methanol"	1997–2018	2–4	Imprisoned, set to be freed in 2042	González, a lawyer, killed one of his clients in 1997 to collect his life insurance, and was convicted in 2000. In 2012, he tried to kill another one of his clients by poisoning him, but he survived. In 2018, he killed another one of his clients to collect her life insurance, being sentenced to 24 years in prison. It is believed that he is responsible for another two murders.
Óscar Segundo López Rodríguez	"The Monster of Lolol"	2012	2–3	Killed by police while resisting arrest in 2012	Antique shop administrator responsible for two murders committed in 2012, also suspected of committing a third, earlier murder.

== See also ==
- Lists of serial killers
