= Greater Iquique =

Chilean conurbation

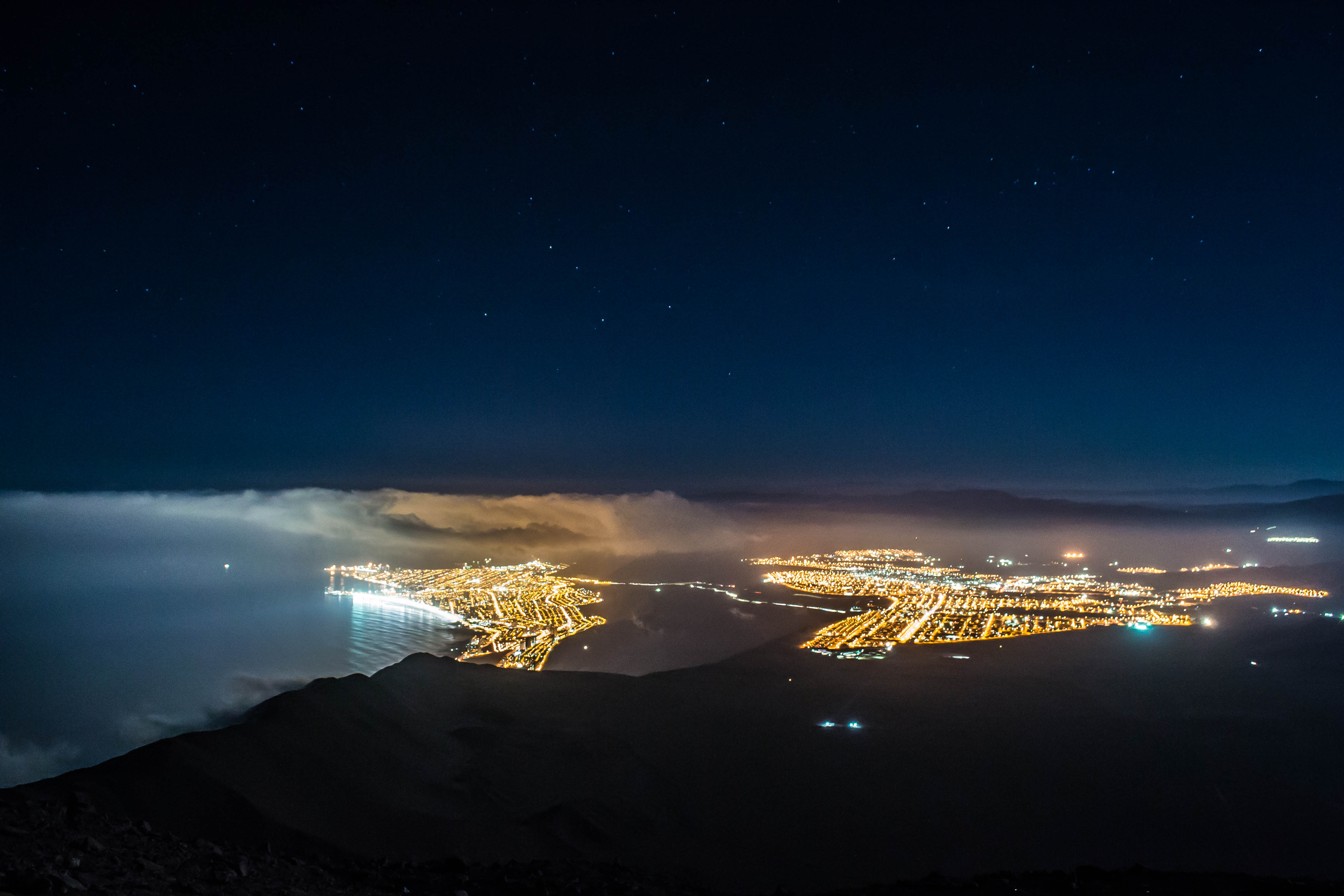
Greater Iquique at night

Greater Iquique, officially Área Metropolitana Alto Hospicio-Iquique, is a Chilean conurbation that includes Iquique and Alto Hospicio communes in the Iquique Province in Tarapacá Region. On 21 December 2023, it was designated a metropolitan area. It has 339,869 inhabitants according to the 2024 census – 199,587 from Iquique and 140,282 from Alto Hospicio.
