= Julio Pérez =

Julio Pérez may refer to:

- Julio Pérez (footballer, born 1926) (1926–2002), Uruguayan football forward
- Julio Pérez Silva (born 1963), Chilean serial killer and taxi driver
- Julio Alberto Pérez (born 1977), Mexican racing cyclist
- Julio Pérez (footballer, born 1991), Bolivian football defender
- Julio C. Perez IV, American film editor

== See also ==
- Julia Perez (1980–2017), Indonesian actress, singer, model, announcer, and businesswoman
