= Julio Pérez Silva =

Chilean serial killer (born 1963)

- Born: Julio Segundo Pérez Silva; July 15, 1963 (age 63); Puchuncaví, Valparaíso, Chile
- Other name: The Psychopath of Alto Hospicio
- Conviction: Murder
- Penalty: Life imprisonment with the possibility of parole after 40 years' imprisonment (murder); 20 years' imprisonment (rape); 10 years' imprisonment (attempted murder)

Details
- Victims: 14–19
- Span of crimes: 1998–2001
- Country: Chile
- Date apprehended: October 4, 2001
- Imprisoned at: High Security Penal Enclosure, CCP Colina I, Colina

Julio Segundo Pérez Silva (born July 15, 1963) is a Chilean taxi driver and serial killer who raped and killed at least 14 women and girls between 1998 and 2001. Popularly known as "The Psychopath of Alto Hospicio", his crimes took place in the Tarapacá Region, specifically in the city of Iquique and in the town of Alto Hospicio, hence his nickname.

His modus operandi was always the same. Working as a taxi driver, he intercepted girls and young women with offers of free rides, then would take them somewhere remote, where he would rape and kill them with blows to the head. Later, Pérez would throw the bodies in deep abandoned mines. He was convicted of killing 14 women and was sentenced to life imprisonment on February 26, 2004.

Pérez confessed to 14 murders, but he is also a suspect for another 5 disappearances.

== Background ==
"Segua", as he was called in his childhood, spent most of years among the streets of Puchuncaví. Those who knew him at the school where he studied agreed that he was a quiet, introverted student.

He married at the age of 22 to Monica Cistemas, a native of La Calera, and they had two daughters. Then, he spent five years with Marianela Vergara, who already had two other daughters. With her he returned to Puchuncaví and reaped the reputation of a good husband.

In the mid-1990s he emigrated to Iquique looking for better job opportunities, finding a job loading sacks of salt. At a party he met Nancy Boero, fourteen years older than him and a mother of six children. After two weeks they were living together and then settled in Alto Hospicio, in a sector known as "La Negra". Later they would move to "Autoconstruccíon", another local sector.

Soon, he left his job to start as a taxi driver illegally. It was then that he began a string of crimes, all of similar characteristics.

== Crimes ==
On September 15, 1998, he picked up 17-year-old Graciela Montserrat Saravia on the waterfront of Iquique. According to his confession, she offered him money in exchange for sex. However, the young woman's real intention was to steal from him. When he noticed this, he beat her to death and left her on a beach.

On November 24, 1999, while driving in Alto Hospicio, he offered 13-year-old Macarena Sánchez a ride to her school. After threatening her with a knife and raping her, he tied her hands and threw her into the Huantajaya Pique, which is more 220 meters deep.

In February 2000 he attacked twice in less than a week; the first was Sara Gómez on February 21, and just 2 days later 23-year-old cellphone promoter Angelica Lay, both of whom were killed in the middle of the desert.

On March 23 of the same year, exactly one month after the fourth murder, he assaulted and murdered 14-year-old Laura Zola, and like Sánchez, she was raped and murdered in Huantajaya.

Then, on April 5, he attacked Katherine Arce, whom he raped and murdered like Angelica Lay, then buried her body in an unofficial garbage dump.

On May 22, 17-year-old Patricia Palma left the lyceum on her way home. It was at that moment that Pérez kidnapped, raped and killed her, leaving her body in Huantajaya along with the corpses of Sánchez and Zola.

Eleven days later, on June 2, he attacked again. He raped and murdered Macarena Montecinos in the "Pampa El Molle" sector, who suffered the same fate as Lay and Arce. The same fate befell 15-year-old Viviana Garay, who was intercepted, raped and killed with a blow to the head. The luck would be different this time, since the father of the last minor mobilized the relatives of other victims, who according to the authorities and the police had fled from their homes, immersed in poverty, to Peru or Bolivia, looking for a better future.

Because of this, Pérez did not attack for nine months, but on April 17, 2001, he struck again in the sector "Autoconstrccíon" where he intercepted a child under 16 years of age, only identified as Maritza, threatening her with a knife and raping her, but did not kill her. Later she managed to escape and returned home. They took her to the hospital, where they took samples of the aggressor's semen. Although Maritza wasn't able to see her attacker due to the darkness, months later, when they checked him, she recognized his voice. They compared the DNA samples and they were identical.

== Reactions of the press and victims' relatives ==
During all that time, the mysterious disappearances of so many young women from Alto Hospicio reached national coverage. However, the authorities of the time - mainly under the Secretary of Interior at the time, Jorge Burgos - and the police assumed that it was most likely that the young people fled their homes due to poverty, possibly migrating to Tacna or Bolivia. There were even some suggestions that the girls probably engaged in prostitution. This fact diverted even more attention from the true motive of the disappearances.

However, with the disappearance of Viviana Garay generated a totally unexpected reaction. The father of the girl, Orlando Garay, mobilized the other affected families. Only then did the event become news, so the crimes briefly stopped.

The Mea Culpa program made a special about this case in 2003.

== Discovery of the murderer ==
=== Searching for the truth ===
Orlando Garay, father of one of the victims Viviana Garay, began to fight for the truth and did not accept the authorities' speculations, selling his fisherman's boat to gather the families of other disappeared girls to find answers. On July 18, 2000, a bag and clothes belonging to Viviana were found on a rubbish dump where, according to her family and friends, she never went to; That same day, in another landfill, the neighbours found Katherine Acre's backpack and uniform. On July 20, Inés Valdivia, mother of Patricia Palma, distinguished her daughter's underwear in a ravine. This was how family members, friends and neighbours looked for the young women.

=== Last crime and arrest ===
On October 4, 2001, Julio Pérez made this last attack, when a young woman identified as Bárbara Nuñez survived. He intercepted and attacked in the same way he did with other victims, the difference was that Pérez confessed to being the murderer; After he had hit her with a stone on the head and thinking she was dead, he left. Nuñez survived however, and managed to report the attack. That same day he was arrested; without any remorse he admitted to the murders and rapes, also confessing to having acted alone and denying having dementia. After his arrest, Pérez provided the necessary information to locate the other victims' bodies. During his trial, he was monitored 24 hours a day and subjected to sleep control, after he tried to commit suicide in his cell with a shoelace wound to a toothbrush.

So far, the names of five other disappeared young and adult women emerged in Alto Hospicio area between April 1999 and August 2001. However, Pérez has claimed to know nothing about them.

=== Condemnation ===
Finally, on February 26, 2004, Pérez, 40 years old at the time, was sentenced to life imprisonment with the possibility of parole after a minimum of 20 years for the murders of 11 adolescents and 3 adults, another 20 years for two rapes, and 10 years for an attempted murder, setting his earliest possible release date in October 2051, when he will be 88 years old. He is currently incarcerated in the high security sector of the Colina I Penitentiary Compliance Centre.

== Victims ==
According to the investigations, the 14 victims of Julio Pérez Silva, murdered between September 12, 1998, and August 23, 2001, would be:

- Graciela Monserrat Saravia, 17, on 15 September 1998 at the Caleta Chanavayita beach in Iquique. Her body was found the next day.
- Ornella Linares Cepeda, 14, on 5 April 1999 in Alto Hospicio. Her body was found on 2 July 2002.
- Ivón Carrillo Lefno, 15, on 9 August 1999 in Iquique. Her body was also found on 2 July 2002.
- Macarena Sánchez Jabré, 14, on 23 November 2000 in Alto Hospicio. Her body was found on 10 October 2001.
- Guisela Melgarejo Navarro, 34, on 2 February 2000 between Pozo Almonte and Alto Hospicio. Her body was found on 25 May 2002.
- Sara Gómez Cuevas, 18, on 21 February 2000 in Alto Hospicio. Her body was found on 24 February 2000.
- Angelica Lay Alcayaga, 25, on 24 February 2000 at the El Pampa sector in Alto Hospicio. Her body was found on 20 October 2001.
- Laura Sola Henríquez, 16, on 23 March 2000 in Alto Hospicio. Her body was found on 10 October 2001.
- Katherine Arce Rivera, 16, on 5 April 2000 in Alto Hospicio. Her body was found on 10 October 2001.
- Patricia Palma Valdivia, 17, on 22 May 2000 in Alto Hospicio. Her body was found on 10 October 2001.
- Macarena Montecinos Iglesias, 15, on 2 June 2000 at Laguna Verde in Iquique. Her body was found on 10 October 2001.
- Viviana Garay Moena, 16, on 30 June 2000 at the El Pampa sector in Alto Hospicio. Her body was found on 20 October 2001.
- Deysi Castro Mamani, 16, on 22 May 2001 in Alto Hospicio. Her body was found on 2 July 2002.
- Angélica Palape Castro, 46, on 23 August 2001 in Alto Hospicio. Her body was found on 2 July 2002.

== See also ==
- List of serial killers by country
- List of serial killers by number of victims
