= Rubén Millatureo =

Chilean serial killer

- Born: Rubén Darío Millatureo Vargas; 3 May 1962 (age 64); Queilén, Chiloé Province, Chile
- Other name: "The Jackal of Queilén"
- Status: Paroled
- Motive: Robbery; necrophilia
- Conviction: Murder x3
- Penalty: Death; commuted to life imprisonment

Details
- Victims: 3–6
- Span of crimes: 1997–1998
- Country: Chile
- State: Los Lagos
- Date apprehended: March 5, 1998
- Imprisoned at: CET Osorno, Osorno, Chile

Rubén Darío Millatureo Vargas (born May 3, 1962), known as The Jackal of Queilén (Spanish: El Chacal de Queilén), is a Chilean serial killer who murdered three people in the town of Queilén from 1997 to 1998.

Initially sentenced to death, his sentence was later commuted to life imprisonment with a chance of parole after 20 years. After serving said 20 years, he was released in 2018.

== Murders ==
On 24 September 1997, Millatureo got into an argument about food with his father, 73-year-old Isidro Segundo Millatureo Ruiz, who was allegedly abusive against Rubén and his recently deceased mother. Following the dispute, he killed his father with an axe after he turned his back on him, dismembered the remains and then buried them under the woodshed, covered with lime and garlic. He told neighbors that Isidro had moved to Punta Arenas for a job and that he kept in touch with him, but even so, rumors persisted that he had been murdered. At one point, Millatureo's cousin and niece to Isidro, Eliana, contacted the Carabineros, who conducted a search together with her, but were unable to locate anything suspicious.

On 13 December, Millatureo was visited by 36-year-old Claudio Eduardo Reyes Sandoval, a salesman from Temuco who had come to collect some paintings he had sold for 6,000 pesos. When Reyes turned his back to check some papers, Millatureo killed him using the axe and then hid the body.

On 5 March of the following year, Millatureo invited 26-year-old María Gabriela Formantel Macías, a childhood friend and the secretary at the fishery where he worked at, to have a cup of tea at his house. There, he attempted to make romantic advances on her, but was rejected. Shortly afterwards, an enraged Millatureo grabbed a nearby axe and killed her, then buried a screwdriver into her chest. He then left the corpse on the bed, engaged in sexual acts with it, and slept next to it. On the following morning, he covered the body with a sheet and stole 1,500,000 pesos Formantel was carrying with her, which he spent on paying off debts for his lover and drinking alcohol.

After failing to return home, Formantel's mother and brother went searching through the neighborhood until they reached Millatureo's house. Seeing that he was not home, they peered through the window, but could not see anything as it was covered by a sheet. The pair then entered the house, where they found Formantel's body. A crowd soon began to form, including carabineros and firefighters who went in to search for additional victims.

After removing the victim's body from the premises, Millatureo returned, but immediately started running after noticing what was going on. He was chased by local townsfolk for half an hour, until he was finally tackled to the ground by a firefighter in the nearby forest. From there, a man later identified as Formantel's brother proceeded to beat up Millatureo several times without interruption.

That same afternoon, he was taken to the Castro Jail, where he admitted to killing Formantel and asked in a nonchalant manner about why everybody was "making a fuss, since they were already dead." In the following days, people from neighboring provinces traveled to Queilén, with some even attempting to burn down Millatureo's house to "scare away the evil spirits". In addition, rumors began to spread about three other missing people as possible victims.

== Trial ==
During the late 1990s, Millatureo was tried and convicted for all three murders, with Judge Francisco Javier del Campo Toledo sentencing him to death by firing squad, the only execution method used in Chile. However, the Court of Appeals of Puerto Montt commuted the sentence to life imprisonment with a chance of parole after 20 years, later upheld by the Supreme Court after capital punishment was abolished in 2001. During his stay in the Osorno Prison, Millatureo had no visitors and reportedly never requested for any prison benefits.

After spending the minimal time required, Millatureo was paroled on May 2, 2018. Locals and members of the victims' families expressed anger at this decision, most notably Heraldo Reyes - the brother of Claudio Reyes - who said in an interview that he would have tracked down and killed Millatureo if it wasn't for his wife and children.

Currently, Millatureo resides in the Los Lagos Region. The house where the murders occurred has since been demolished and replaced by a cross commemorating the victims.

== In media and culture ==
The case was featured on an episode of Mea culpa, titled "El Rubencito". In it, the producers interviewed Corporal Armando Silva (the policeman who arrested Millatureo), Judge Francisco del Campo, and Millatureo himself, still incarcerated at the time, who said revealed that he also planned to murder his cousin Eliana and the husband of his secret lover Eufemia.

The 2014 Chilean film Joselito was also directly inspired by this case.

== See also ==
- List of serial killers in Chile
