= Diego Ruiz Restrepo =

Colombian serial killer (born 1990)

- Born: Diego Alexánder Ruiz Restrepo; 14 March 1990 (age 36); Cali, Colombia
- Other name: Psychopath of Meiggs
- Children: 1
- Penalty: Life imprisonment with the possibility of parole after 40 years

Details
- Victims: 7–27
- Span of crimes: 2018–2020
- Country: Chile
- State: Santiago Metropolitan Region
- Target: Homeless people
- Date apprehended: 9 November 2020

Diego Alexánder Ruiz Restrepo (born 14 March 1990) is a Colombian serial killer active in Chile. Known as the Psychopath of Meiggs (Spanish: psicópata de Meiggs), he is confirmed to have committed at least 7 murders in the Meiggs neighborhood of Estación Central, between March and November 2020, where he had been living as an undocumented immigrant since 2013. The Chilean Prosecutor's Office also linked him to the murder of 20 other people.

== Early and personal life ==
Ruiz's mother became pregnant at age 16 and her partner abandoned her. Ruiz was raised by his maternal grandparents. He studied at the Colegio Carlos Holmes Trujillo, located in Comuna 15, Aguablanca District. He worked as a car mechanic for 5 years, being his longest employment.

Ruiz's mother emigrated to Chile in 2010, and he followed her, posing as a tourist to enter the country 3 years later. In this country he had several jobs, mainly related to civil construction. At 22, Ruiz professed the Christian faith, like his family, loved and appreciated by the community of the neighborhood where he lived, in Cali.

Ruiz has a son, Andy, born from a relationship with an Ecuadorian woman in Chile. Starting in 2015, he lived with his sister and brother-in-law in an apartment in La Alameda, in the Santiago commune. His brother-in-law described Ruiz as an alcoholic, violent and abusive of his sister. At some point, Ruiz stabbed his sister, his mother, his grandfather and his stepfather. His sister has a restraining order against him.

According to reports, Ruiz was known for constantly getting involved in conflicts in the neighborhood where he lived, such as arguments, even going so far as to threaten neighbors with a melee weapon. He also already had a police record for robberies. He was involved in robberies, threats and the use of bladed weapons, which prevented him from obtaining a permanent residence visa in Chile.

== Crimes ==
=== Murders ===
On 7 March 2020, Víctor Olegario Allende Salas (72) was found dead. He had accusations of sexual abuse against his daughters and suffered from senile dementia. He was recognized as Ruiz's first victim. Several months later on 1 November, Colombian immigrant Carlos Andrés Rivas Angulo (35) was found dead; he emigrated to Chile in 2010. After a night of drinking with his friends, around 1 am, he was stabbed about 25 times by Ruiz. Later that day, Guido Hernán Gallardo Contreras (64), was also found killed. He was homeless at the time of his death. Little is known about this victim, since he was never married, had no known children, his birth certificate doesn't have the full name of his mother, and his electoral residence did not belong to him.

On 8 November, Ruiz murdered four more victims, with the first one being Luis Marcelo Romero Jeria (49), a homeless addict. He had children, but none of them was notified of his death by any institution. Marcia Margot Tapia Loncón (57) became the next victim. Despite the fact that she had a residence in Cerro Navia, she was living as homeless in Estación Central area, she suffered from alcoholism and schizophrenia and had two children. Leónidas Vicente Panez Fierro (40) was the third victim of that day. Panez's mother died when he was 8 years old, and he, along with his 2 brothers, grew up in an orphanage. He was a former Carabinero and lived in a tent in Estación Central because of homelessness. He had an ex-wife and three children; His son Brandon was informed of the death of his father through the press. The fourth victim was Rodrigo "Che" Manino Carmona (32). He was an Argentine immigrant, born in Mendoza to an Italian father and an Argentine mother, who arrived in the country in 2016. He was stabbed in the neck by Ruiz and was buried in Santiago General Cemetery.

=== Other crimes ===
Ruiz encountered Óscar P. on 3 August 2020. Ruiz threatened him with a 20-centimeter knife in his hand and told him "I have killed many people before. What if I chose you next? You don't even know who I am I." Óscar P. was able to dodge the attack and reported it to the Carabineros de Chile. Pedro Manuel Bustamante Babbonney (44), was also attacked by Ruiz on 8 November 2020. After being stabbed together with his friend Leónidas Vicente Panez, he was kicked by Diego Ruiz, but survived after receiving medical care at the Barros Arana National Institute. After recovering, he returned to his situation on the streets. Some members of the press incorrectly identified him as a deceased victim.

In addition to his 7 confirmed murders, Ruiz's involvement in 20 other deaths is currently being investigated. If these 20 deaths are confirmed, Diego Ruiz Restrepo would be considered the most prolific serial killer in the history of Chile. Among them was Carlos Núñez Valenzuela (46) who was murdered on 16 April 2018. He received six stab wounds. As of 2021, the Public Ministry continues to investigate him as a possible victim of Ruiz.

== Investigation and arrest ==
According to Infobae, chief investigator Pamela Contreras said that the police "realized that it was a subject who was repeating a pattern, who made sequences of walks between sectors that were identical" between the two weeks in which the crimes took place. The crimes were solved because images were captured by security cameras. Subsequently, the clothes worn by Ruiz while committing the crimes, including a hood, were found in his home.

Ruiz was arrested for investigation on 9 November and days later, a judge ordered him held in custody because he "represented a danger to society." According to the judge, based on the investigations, Ruiz attacked his victims "indiscriminately and brutally" without "any provocation" and without "the victims' chance of defense". He was initially involved in seven murders, but investigations point to as many as 15 victims. As of January 2021, he was serving preventive detention at the Special High Security Unit in Santiago.

In July 2023, he was given a qualified life sentence, which is appealable after a minimum of 40 years served in Chile.

== Modus operandi ==
Ruiz attacked homeless people of both sexes. According to the forensic psychologist, Belisario Valbuena, Ruiz chose this profile because they are "people who are not missed by a family...many of them cannot even be identified." Some families of the victims were never informed by the security institutions, and only found out about the death of their relatives through the press. Ruiz bloodiest night was 8 November when he attacked 5 people in 70 minutes, of which 4 died.

== See also ==
- List of serial killers in Colombia
- List of serial killers in Chile
