= Lucho Plátano =

Chilean serial killer (born 2002)

- Born: Luis Ignacio Vásquez Villenas; 5 May 2002 (age 24); San Ramón, Chile
- Penalty: Life imprisonment with the possibility of parole after 20 years, plus 61 years' imprisonment
- Accomplice: María Jesús Fernández

Details
- Victims: 4
- Span of crimes: 2022–2023
- Country: Chile
- Date apprehended: 8 February 2023

Luis Ignacio Vásquez Villenas (born 5 May 2002), better known by the nickname Lucho Plátano, is a Chilean criminal and serial killer currently imprisoned for four murders that occurred in the Santiago Metropolitan Region between May 2022 and January 2023, culminating with the murder of Daniel Valdés Donoso, commissioner of the Investigations Police of Chile (PDI). While he was a fugitive, he was declared by the courts as the “most wanted in Chile”. He was apprehended in February 2023 and sentenced to life imprisonment, plus 61 years, in 2026.

== Crimes ==
During his period as an organized crime leader, Vásquez typically recruited minors from his commune, La Granja, known as "Los Parra", to help him steal vehicles parked in the driveway. According to testimony from his partner, María Jesús Fernández Uribe, he was a "recognized figure" in his commune, being an "admirable model" to his followers.

=== First murders ===
On 24 May 2022, Vásquez and his gang tried to steal Matías Ortega Yáñez's car, but after engaging in a fight with Ortega, which ended with a shot to his leg, the attackers fled. That same night, they murdered a friend of Ortega's, José Ignacio Bórquez Zapata, who was living with a trafficker in the area. Days later, he killed Giovanni Óscar Araneda Cofré, who had previously fought with his cousin Danilo Moya Araneda, a close friend of Vásquez, about a sum of money earned in a robbery. His third murder occurred on 17 October, when he fatally shot Vito Luciano Osses Reyes. After receiving testimony of the events that occurred, which also involved a minor, he became a nationally searched individual by investigators.

On 12 December 12, there was an attempt on his life by an enemy gang, but they confused the Vásquez group with a group of 4 innocent young people, all four ending their lives.

=== Murder of Daniel Valdés ===
On January 17, 2023, Vásquez attempted to steal the car belonging to Daniel Valdés Donoso. After seeing the robbery taking place, Valdés raised his shirt to shoot Vásquez with his weapon assigned by the Investigations Police (PDI), but the latter shot him four times in the face, killing him. According to Vásquez's driver, Gabriel Inostroza Morales, he realized that Valdés was a PDI commissioner only after the murder. Vásquez spent the next three weeks hiding from the authorities in his partner's apartment, located in the commune of San Ramón. After the events, he tried to sell Valdés' gun.

== Capture ==
Vásquez was finally captured and detained by the PDI, in a collaboration between its homicide, robbery and crime, anti-narcotics departments and organized crime brigades, and the tactical reaction brigade on 8 February, after spending 22 days in hiding.

After being arrested, three people belonging to the street gang of Vásquez, including his personal driver and his partner, were formalized as concealers. He is currently under preventive detention in the high-security module of the Rancagua Prison on charges of simple robbery, robbery with intimidation, theft of property for public use, frustrated homicides and consummated homicides.

== Legal proceedings ==
His trial began on 26 January 2026. He faced life imprisonment on top of over 100 years' imprisonment. In April 2026, he was ultimately sentenced to simple life imprisonment, plus 61 years.

== See also ==
- List of serial killers in Chile
