= Iquique =

- City and commune
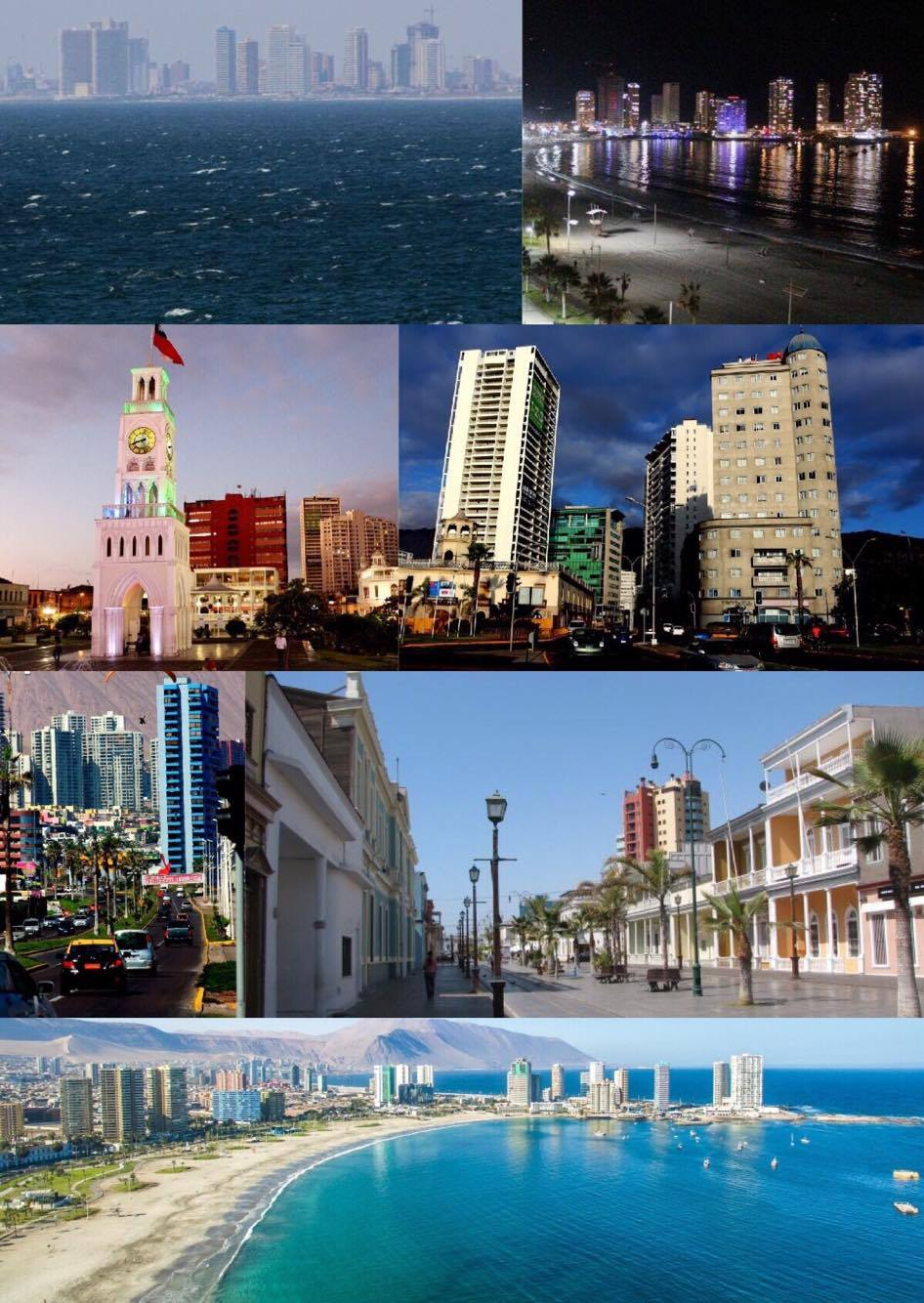
- Montage of images of Iquique.

- Flag Coat of arms Map of Iquique in Tarapacá Region Location in Chile
- Anthem: Himno de Iquique
- Coordinates: 20°13′S 70°9′W
- Country: Chile
- Region: Tarapacá
- Province: Iquique
- Founded: 16th Century

Government
  - Type: Municipal council
  - Alcalde: Mauricio Soria Macchiavello

Area
  - City and commune: 2,242.1 km^{2} (865.7 sq mi)
- Elevation: 1 m (3.3 ft)

Population (2024)
  - City and commune: 199,587
  - Density: 89.018/km^{2} (230.56/sq mi)
  - Urban: 196,008
  - Rural: 3,579
- Time zone: UTC−4 (CLT)
  - Summer (DST): UTC−3 (CLST)
- Postal code: 1100000
- Climate: BWh
- Website: www.municipioiquique.cl (in Spanish)

Iquique (Spanish pronunciation: [iˈkike]) is a port city and commune in northern Chile, capital of both the Iquique Province and Tarapacá Region. It lies on the Pacific coast, west of the Pampa del Tamarugal, which is part of the Atacama Desert. It has a population of 199,587 as of 2024. Greater Iquique, which includes the suburb of Alto Hospicio, is the 6th-largest urban area in Chile with a population of 324,523.

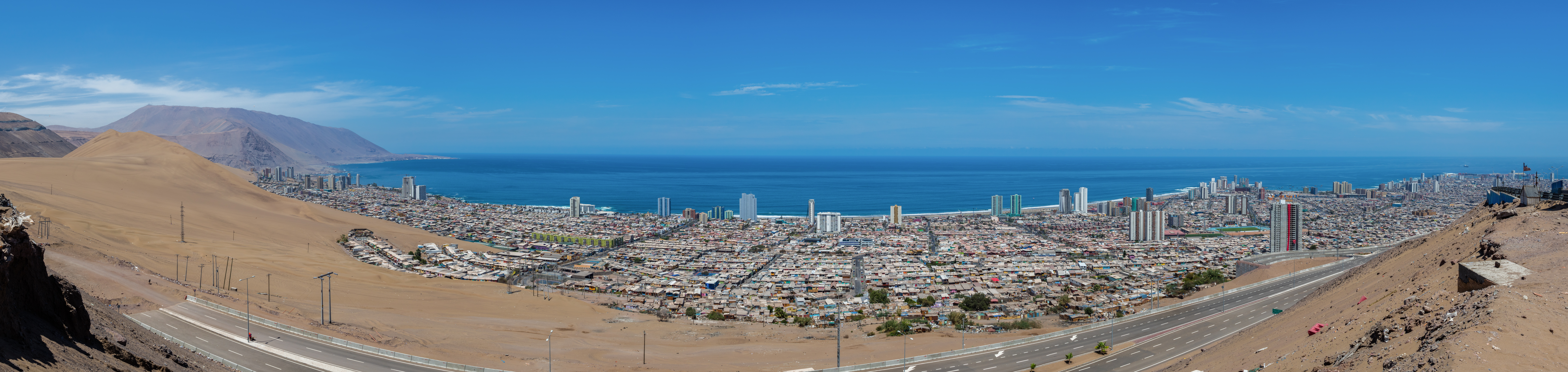
Panoramic view of Iquique.

The city developed during the heyday of the saltpetre mining in the Atacama Desert in the 19th century. Once a Peruvian city with a large Chilean population, it was conquered by Chile in the War of the Pacific (1879–1883). Today it is one of only two free ports of Chile, the other one being Punta Arenas, in the country's far south.

== Etymology ==
Its name comes from the Aymara language: "Iki Iki," meaning "land of dreams."

== History ==
Although the city was founded in the 16th century, there is evidence of habitation in the area by the Chango people as early as 7,000 BC. During colonial times, Iquique was part of the Viceroyalty of Peru as much of South America was at the time, and remained part of Peruvian territory until the end of the 19th century. Iquique's early development was due in large part to the discovery of mineral riches, particularly the presence of large deposits of sodium nitrate in the Atacama Desert (then part of Peruvian territory); and guano.

In July 1834, Charles Darwin, during his voyage on the Beagle, traveled to Iquique and described it as a town "very much in want of everyday necessities, such as water and firewood". These necessities had to be brought in from considerable distances. Darwin also visited the saltpetre works.

The city has been devastated by several earthquakes, including the 1868 Arica earthquake, the 1877 Iquique earthquake, and the 2005 Tarapacá earthquake. The 2014 Iquique earthquake occurred with a moment magnitude of 8.2 on April 1, 2014.

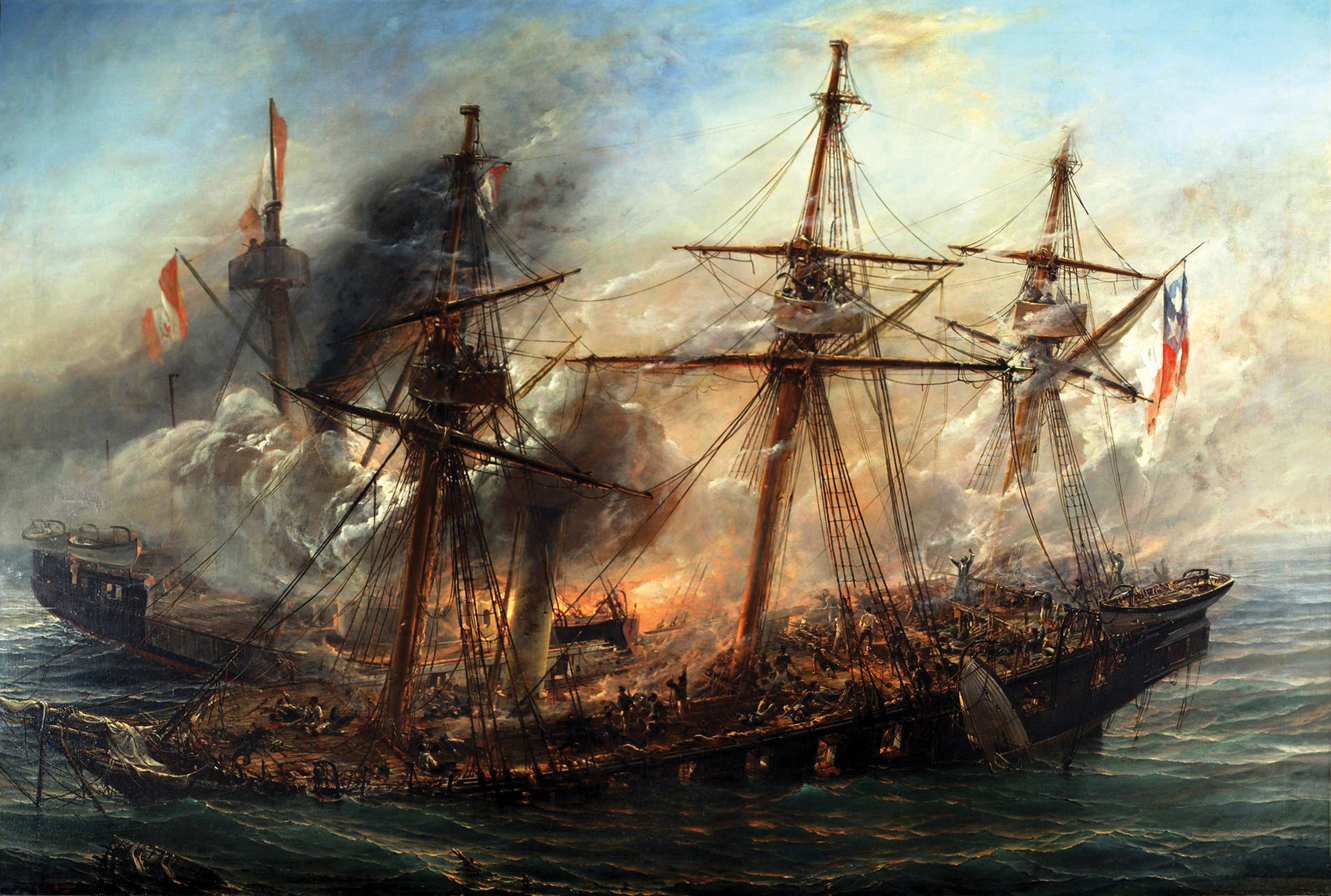
Naval Battle of Iquique during the War of the Pacific (1879–1884).

Territorial disputes between Bolivia and Chile triggered the War of the Pacific in 1879. The Battle of Iquique was fought in the harbor of Iquique on May 21, 1879, now commemorated as Navy Day, an annual public holiday in Chile. The outcome of the war gave Chile this portion of the Peruvian territory.

Over the years there was substantial emigration from other parts of Chile to this area which was called the Norte Grande. In subsequent years the further exportation of Chilean saltpetre (mainly to European countries) significantly helped in the development of the city, attracting foreigners and rapidly expanding housing projects.

In December 1907, the city was marred by the Santa María de Iquique Massacre when the Chilean Army, under the command of Gen. Roberto Silva Renard, opened fire on thousands of saltpetre miners, and their wives and children, who assembled inside the Santa María School. The workers had marched into town to protest their working conditions and wages. Somewhere between 500 and 2,000 people were killed. The folk group Quilapayún recorded an album in remembrance of the event (Cantata Santa María de Iquique) in 1970. In December 2007 a series of cultural and ceremonial activities were planned, culminating in the week between December 14 to 21, to commemorate the centenary year of the massacre.

Mars 96 was launched by Russia in 1996, but failed to leave the Earth orbit, and re-entered the atmosphere a few hours later. The two RTGs onboard carried 200 g of plutonium in total and are assumed to have survived the re-entry as they were designed to do. They are thought to now lie somewhere in a northeast-southwest running oval 320 km (199 mi) long by 80 km (50 mi) wide, which is centred 32 km (20 mi) east of Iquique, Chile.

Prior to becoming Chilean territory, Iquique was home to some of the greatest Peruvian heroes, namely Alfonso Ugarte (who was elected mayor in 1876), Ramón Zavala, a rich saltpetre entrepreneur; Guillermo Billinghurst, later President of Peru (who after being overthrown in 1914 came to Iquique – then already under Chilean rule – to live out his last years), and Ramón Castilla, thrice president of Peru, who was born in San Lorenzo de Tarapacá and died in the Desert of Tiviliche, Tarapacá, who lived in Iquique during his mandate as Governor of Tarapacá in 1825.

== Climate ==
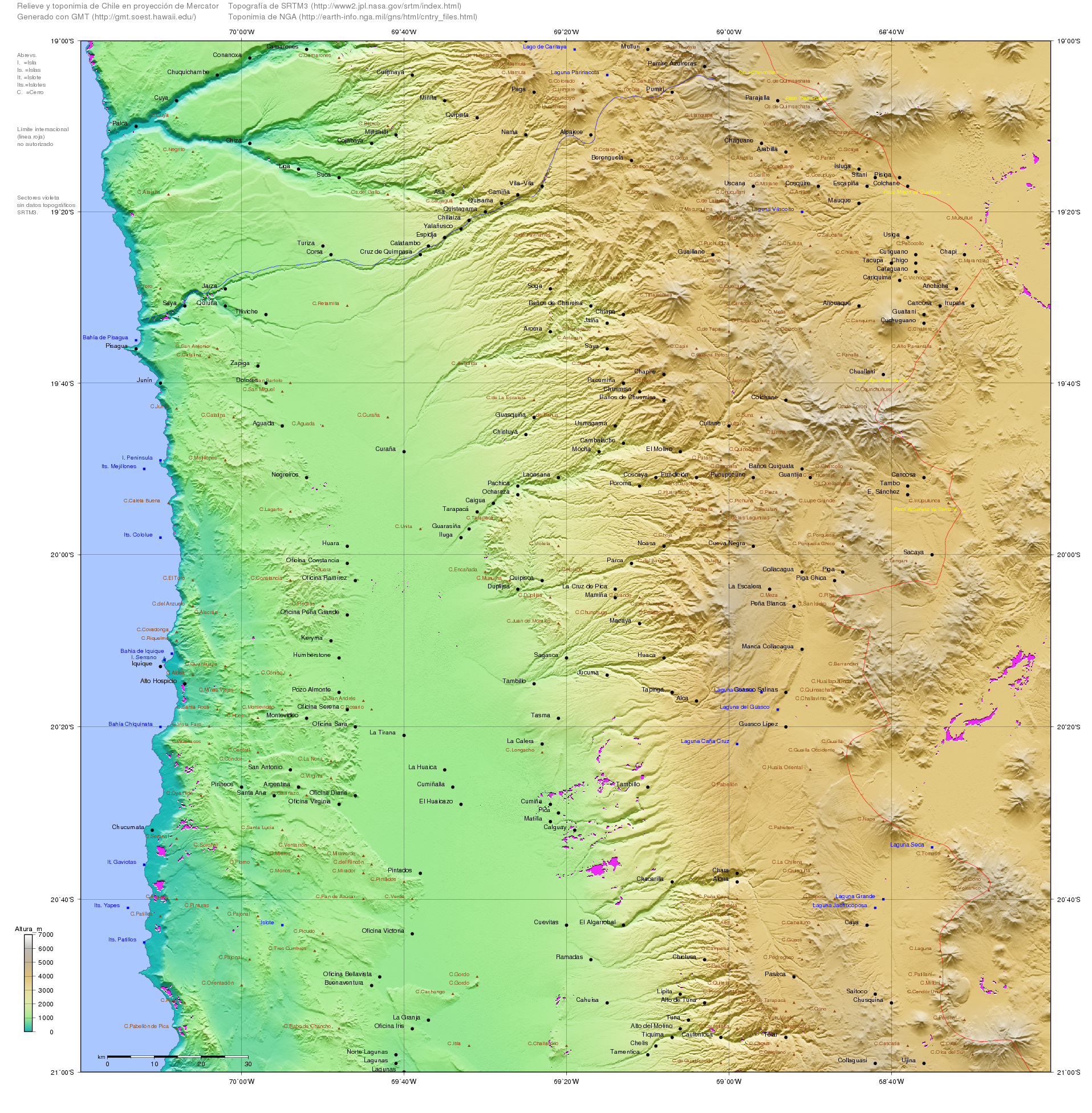
Iquique geographical position in the Region of Tarapaca.

Iquique has an unusually mild to warm desert climate (Köppen: BWh) with low extremes of temperatures all year round and almost no rainfall. Due to its abundant cloudiness and coastal location, the climate is often abbreviated to BWn, as opposed to the usual BWh or BWk. It is common for this place to have completely dry years without any precipitation day, making it one of the driest cities in the world, along with Arica.

Climate data for Iquique (1991–2020, extremes 1981–present)
Month	Jan	Feb	Mar	Apr	May	Jun	Jul	Aug	Sep	Oct	Nov	Dec	Year
Record high °C (°F)	31.2 (88.2)	30.6 (87.1)	31.1 (88.0)	30.4 (86.7)	28.0 (82.4)	24.1 (75.4)	33.4 (92.1)	31.0 (87.8)	23.4 (74.1)	24.2 (75.6)	25.5 (77.9)	27.8 (82.0)	33.4 (92.1)
Mean daily maximum °C (°F)	25.4 (77.7)	25.9 (78.6)	24.9 (76.8)	22.7 (72.9)	20.5 (68.9)	18.7 (65.7)	17.8 (64.0)	17.8 (64.0)	18.5 (65.3)	19.8 (67.6)	21.5 (70.7)	23.5 (74.3)	21.4 (70.5)
Daily mean °C (°F)	22.0 (71.6)	22.2 (72.0)	21.3 (70.3)	19.5 (67.1)	17.8 (64.0)	16.5 (61.7)	15.6 (60.1)	15.6 (60.1)	16.1 (61.0)	17.1 (62.8)	18.6 (65.5)	20.3 (68.5)	18.6 (65.5)
Mean daily minimum °C (°F)	18.9 (66.0)	18.9 (66.0)	18.1 (64.6)	16.5 (61.7)	15.3 (59.5)	14.5 (58.1)	13.9 (57.0)	13.9 (57.0)	14.4 (57.9)	15.2 (59.4)	16.2 (61.2)	17.5 (63.5)	16.1 (61.0)
Record low °C (°F)	14.8 (58.6)	14.7 (58.5)	13.0 (55.4)	11.7 (53.1)	9.9 (49.8)	8.5 (47.3)	8.3 (46.9)	7.6 (45.7)	9.0 (48.2)	8.5 (47.3)	11.9 (53.4)	12.4 (54.3)	7.6 (45.7)
Average precipitation mm (inches)	0.0 (0.0)	0.0 (0.0)	0.0 (0.0)	0.1 (0.00)	0.3 (0.01)	0.0 (0.0)	0.1 (0.00)	0.2 (0.01)	0.0 (0.0)	0.0 (0.0)	0.0 (0.0)	0.1 (0.00)	0.8 (0.03)
Average precipitation days (≥ 1.0 mm)	0.0	0.0	0.0	0.0	0.0	0.0	0.1	0.1	0.0	0.0	0.0	0.0	0.2
Average relative humidity (%)	66	66	68	70	71	71	71	72	71	70	68	67	69
Mean monthly sunshine hours	317.8	296.2	297.9	252.5	211.4	161.0	151.2	158.2	189.7	235.6	275.7	315.1	2,862.3
Source 1: Dirección Meteorológica de Chile
Source 2: NOAA (precipitation days 1991–2020)

== Demographics ==
Historical population
Year	Pop.	±% p.a.
1885	18,013	—
1895	35,007	+6.87%
1907	41,681	+1.46%
1920	38,375	−0.63%
1930	48,186	+2.30%
1940	39,282	−2.02%
1952	40,934	+0.34%
1970	64,917	+2.60%
1982	110,991	+4.57%
1992	145,139	+2.72%
2002	166,204	+1.36%
2017	191,468	+0.95%
2024	199,587	+0.60%
Source: INE, Memoria Chilena

As of the 2024 census, the population is 199,587, of which 49.3% are males, and 50.7% are females. People aged under 15 years old make up 18.8% of the population, and people aged 65 years old and over make up 12.1%. 98.2% of the population is urban, and 1.8% is rural.

The commune is divided into the following districts:

District	Population (2002)	Area (km^{2})	Density
Port	3,721	0.8	4,651.3
Industrial District	12,800	65.4	195.7
Hospital	11,087	5.1	2,173.9
Caupolicán	19,486	2.2	8,857.3
Playa Brava	18,580	2.1	8,847.6
Cavancha	13,729	1.4	9,806.4
Parque Balmaceda	10,843	1.1	9,857.3
Arturo Prat	10,773	1.0	10,773.0
Punta Lobos	1,592	2,127.8	0.7
Gómez Carreño	23,165	1.7	13,626.5
La Tirana	40,428	33.5	1,206.8

=== Ethnic minorities ===
As of the 2024 census, Indigenous peoples make up 16.7% of the population, and Afro-Chileans make up 1.0%.

There is a significant percentage of residents from different international ethnic groups. The largest communities are Croatian, Italian, Greek, Chinese, Arabic nationalities, Peruvians and Bolivians, British peoples (i.e. Scots), and the French.

In the 1910s and 1920s, about a thousand East Indian (from India and Pakistani) Chile saltpetre mine workers hired by British mine companies appeared in Iquique and today, their descendants are mixed into the local population. Lately, a wave of North American and Australian immigrants came to retire and enjoy the city's beach climate.

=== Religion ===
As of the 2024 census, 74.4% of the population over 15 years old are Christians (61.0% Catholics, 9.8% Evangelicals or Protestants, and 3.7% other branches), 0.1% are Jews, 0.5% are Muslims, 0.2% are Buddhists, 0.2% are Hinduists, 0.4% are adrehents of other religions, and 24.1% are irreligious.

=== Inmigration ===
As of the 2024 census, immigrants make up 20.4% of the population – 18.7% are from South America, 0.5% from North America, 0.1% from Europe, 0.9% from Asia, <0.1% from Africa, and <0.1% from Oceania.

== Administration ==
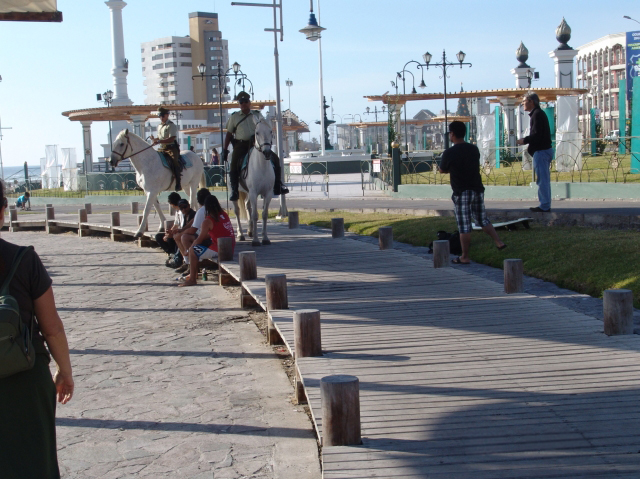
Iquique Mounted Police at Cavanche

As a commune, Iquique is a third-level administrative division of Chile administered by a municipal council, headed by an alcalde who is directly elected every four years. The 2012–2016 alcalde is Jorge Soria.

Within the electoral divisions of Chile, Iquique is represented in the Chamber of Deputies by Marta Isasi (Ind.) and Hugo Gutiérrez (PC) as part of the 2nd electoral district, which includes the entire Tarapacá Region. The commune is represented in the Senate by José Miguel Insulza (PS, 2018–2026) and José Durana (UDI, 2018–2026) as part of the 1st senatorial constituency (Arica and Parinacota Region and Tarapacá Region).

=== List of mayors ===
Since 2016, the incumbent mayor is Mauricio Soria Macchiavello.

Mayor	Party	Term	
Mayor	Party	Begin	End
Mayors of the First Municipality (1873–1879)
Alfonso Ugarte	—N/a	January 4, 1876	1877
Benigno Posada Galís	—N/a	1877	1878
1879: Change in administration
Eduardo de Lapeyrouse	Partido Liberal	1879	1879
Máximo Rosenstock Sube	Partido Conservador	1879	1883
Exequiel Fuentes Villarroel	Partido Liberal Democrático	1883	1884
Rafael Sotomayor Gaete	Partido Radical	1884	1887
Manuel Cunningham Escribar	Partido Liberal	1887	1887
Antonio Valdés Cuevas	Partido Liberal	1887	1890
Mayors under the Autonomous Commune Law (1891–1973)
Gumecindo Moya Castro	Partido Radical	1891	1897
Arturo del Río Racet	Partido Liberal Democrático	1897	1910
Belisario del Canto Barriga	Partido Nacional	1910	1915
Carlos Monardes Ossandón	Partido Radical	1915	1920
Manuel Antonio Godoy Simon	Partido Radical	1920	1922
Pedro Portillo Toledo	Partido Obrero Socialista	1922	1925
Santiago Macchiavello Varas	Partido Radical	1925	1927
Enrique Brenner Duarte	Partido Liberal	1927	June 1, 1932
Luis Cuevas Fernández	Partido Liberal	June 1, 1932	June 5, 1932
Enrique Brenner Duarte	Partido Liberal	June 5, 1932	1932
Francisco Olmos Hurtado	Partido Liberal	1932	1933
Eduardo Valenzuela Prado	Partido Socialista	1933	1935
Alfonso Echeverría Yáñez	Partido Radical	1935	1938
Luis Valenzuela E.	Partido Comunista	1938	1940
Eloy Ramírez Ugalde	Partido Comunista	1940	1940
Alejandro Gamboni	Falange Nacional	1941	1941
René Reyes Navarro	Partido Comunista	1941	1944
Anaximandro Bermúdez Morales	Partido Liberal	1944	1947
José Zárate Andreu	Partido Radical	1947	1950
Pedro Muga González	Falange Nacional	1950	1953
Alejandro Valencia Joo	Partido Socialista	1953	1956
José Rodríguez Vergara	Partido Socialista	1956	1960
Francisco Gallo Vallejo	Partido Socialista	1960	1963
Samuel Astorga Jorquera	Partido Demócrata Cristiano	1963	1964
Jorge Soria Quiroga	Partido Socialista	February 24, 1964	September 11, 1973
Mayors designated by the Military Regime (1973–1992)
Javier Provoste Sáez	Partido Nacional	1973	August 1, 1975
Patricio Vidal Corbalán	—N/a	August 1, 1975	1978
Guillermo Barrios Merino	—N/a	January 10, 1978	April 18, 1979
Egidio Feliú Arellano	—N/a	April 19, 1979	April 18, 1981
Marta Marcich Moller	Renovación Nacional	April 19, 1981	June 3, 1986
Myrta Dubost Jiménez	Unión Demócrata Independiente	June 3, 1986	September 26, 1992
Mayors since the Transition (1992–present)
Jorge Soria Quiroga	Partido Comunista	September 26, 1992	December 6, 1996
Jorge Soria Quiroga	Partido por la Democracia	December 6, 1996	December 6, 2000
Jorge Soria Quiroga	Independent (PPD)	December 6, 2000	December 6, 2004
Jorge Soria Quiroga	Partido Regionalista Independiente	December 6, 2004	2007
Myrta Dubost Jiménez	Unión Demócrata Independiente	April 18, 2007	November 13, 2012
Hernán Araya (interim)		November 13, 2012	December 6, 2012
Jorge Soria Quiroga	Fuerza del Norte	December 6, 2012	October 7, 2016
Astrid Astorga (interim)		October 7, 2016	December 6, 2016
Mauricio Soria Macchiavello	Independent (NM)	December 6, 2016	Incumbent

== Economy ==
The economic activity of Iquique, capital of the Tarapacá Region, is mainly based on international trade through the Iquique Free Trade Zone (ZOFRI) and the maritime port (one of the six busiest ports in Chile), large-scale copper mining, tourism, the fishing industry, manufacturing, and construction.

In 2018, the number of companies registered in Iquique was 7,404. The Economic Complexity Index (ECI) in the same year was 0.89, while the economic activities with the highest Revealed Comparative Advantage (RCA) index were:

- Manufacture of Batteries and Primary Cells (49.64)
- Judicial Power Activities (27.5)

Electrical and Electronic Repairs (19.43)

=== Trade ===
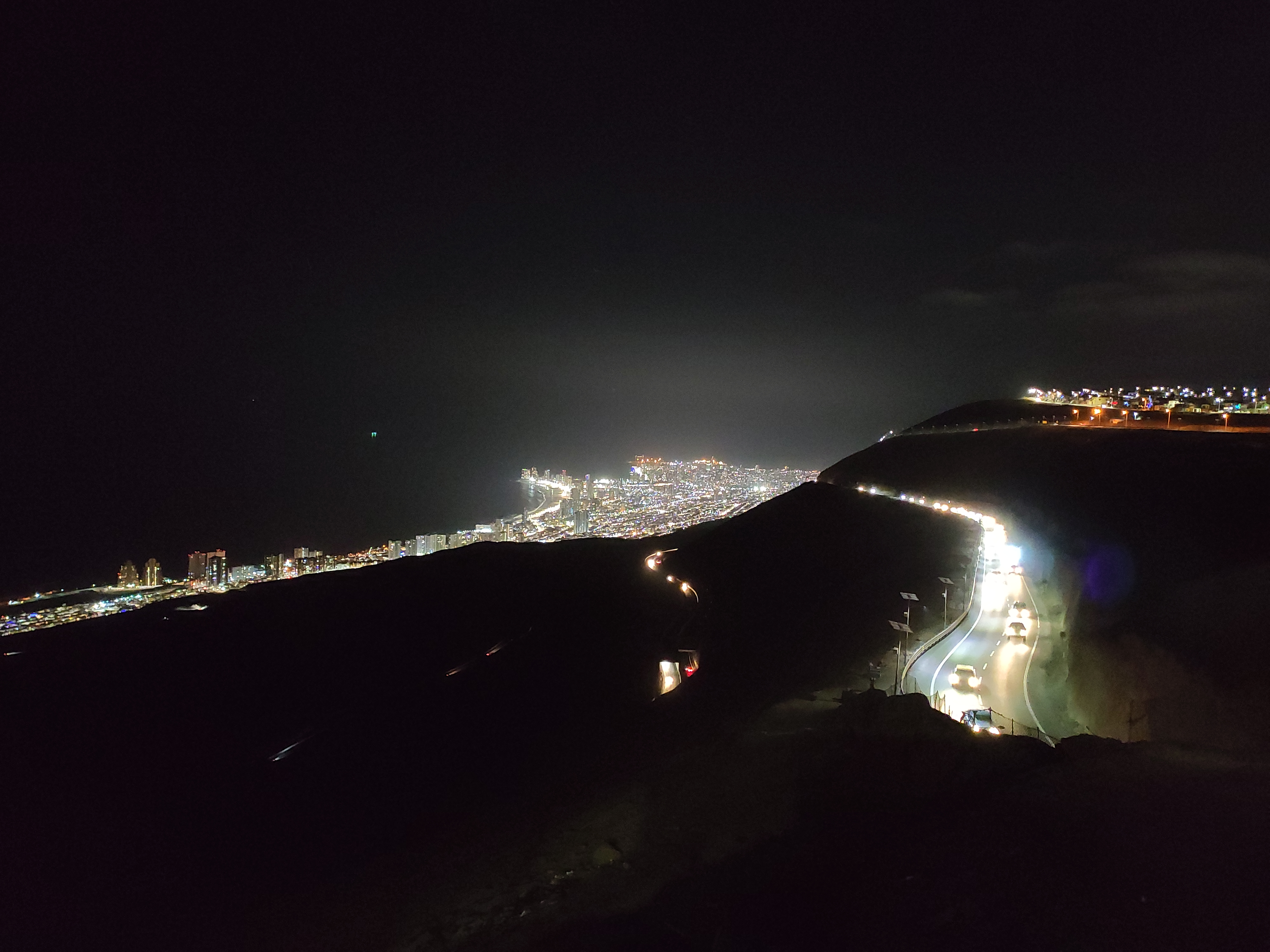
Night view of Iquique from Alto Hospicio.

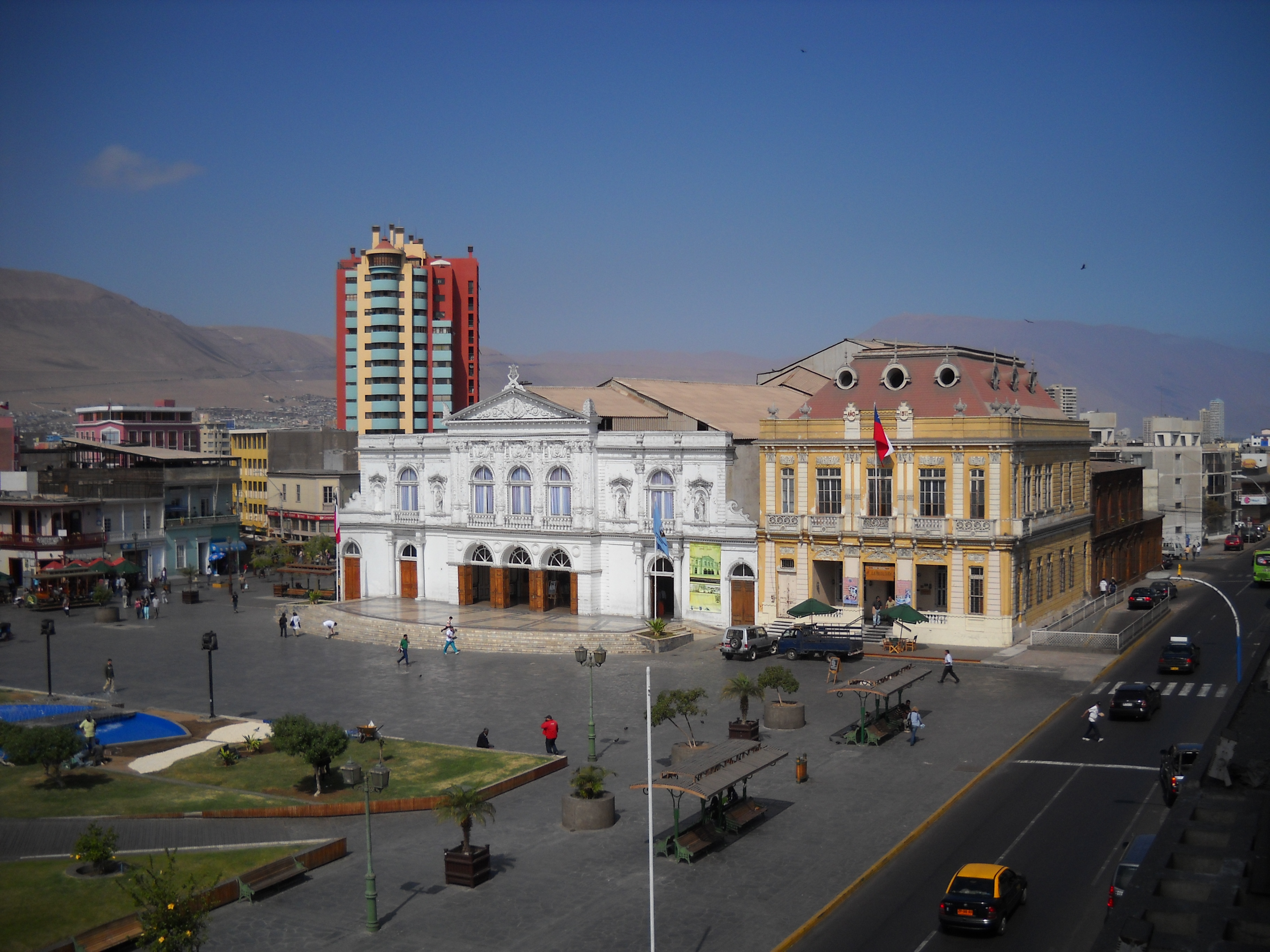
Iquique Municipal Theater.

Trade is important, as the region serves as a transit point for Chilean products heading toward the northern countries (Peru and Bolivia) and Brazil, due to the existing interoceanic corridor. The Iquique Free Trade Zone (ZOFRI) has spurred commercial development, especially in the sale of automobiles and technological products, which attract a large number of Chileans and foreigners.

The city has three shopping centers (Malls), one of which is Mall Zofri, part of the free trade system that sells retail products exempt from the 19% VAT; another is Mall Plaza Iquique (formerly Mall Las Américas), which includes Falabella and La Polar stores. This business hub hosts more than 1,650 companies that carry out trade operations worth about 4.7 billion USD annually.

Additionally, the city has a service center where large department stores coexist with banks, public entities, and SMEs mostly covering sectors such as manufacturing, retail, and food services. Around Paseo Baquedano, a highly touristic area, businesses and services thrive to meet the needs of local enterprises, making this part of the city a commercial and business hub due to its comparative advantages and the presence of key institutions like the General Police Station and several fire brigades.

=== Used clothes ===
The port of Iquique plays a central role in Chile’s importation of used clothing, which totals around 123,000 tonnes annually according to government estimates. As part of a free-trade zone, it enables businesses in Iquique and surrounding areas to import and sell goods without paying customs duties or tax.

=== Fishing Industry ===
The production of fishmeal and fish oil represents 50% and 60% of the national total, respectively. Industrial fishing, which began in the 1950s, provides the largest contribution to the Gross Geographic Product (26%). Iquique is Chile’s largest fishing port, accounting for 35% of the nation’s total catch (mainly anchovy and jack mackerel), with 95% of the production destined for oil and fishmeal, and the remaining 5% for canned, frozen, and other products.

=== Manufacturing ===
The manufacturing industry accounts for 5% of the Gross Geographic Product. Its main activities include shipyards, which have expanded their building capacity — for instance, the Marco Chilena shipyards, which construct both fishing vessels and luxury yachts. The city’s workshops manufacture spare parts and components serving primarily the mining and fishing industries.

=== Construction ===
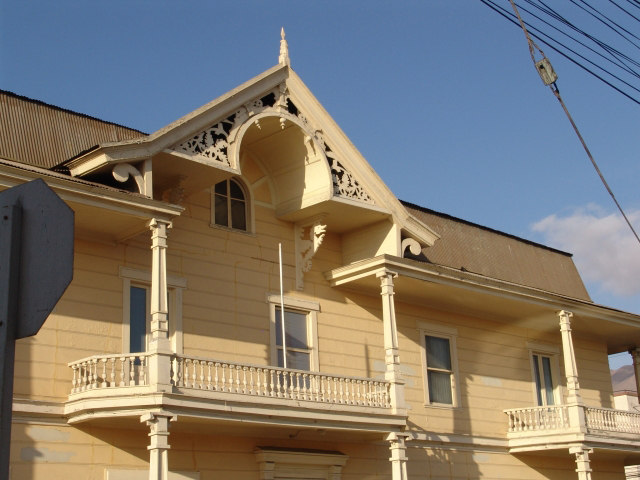
The Astoreca Palace in Iquique, reflecting the influence of Spanish colonial architecture.

Civil construction has been the driving force behind Iquique’s growth over the past 15 years, giving the sector a highly dynamic character. However, the lack of available urban land has limited housing development, leading to the dominance of high-rise buildings. Many buildings exceed 25 floors, efficiently using the limited land.

Currently, residential construction projects are concentrated in the southern area, mainly Bajo Molle, but since it lies outside the urban boundary, it lacks proper infrastructure, resulting in fewer housing projects. Another area with major construction activity is the coastal zone — mainly Cavancha and Playa Brava — where the tallest building in the city (37 floors) is being built.

=== Mining ===
Metallic mining mainly involves copper extraction, which takes place in Quebrada Blanca, Cerro Colorado, and Doña Inés de Collahuasi, which began full production in 1999 and has become one of the world’s largest mines.

Non-metallic mining mainly focuses on Sodium Chloride (common salt), extracted from the Salar Grande salt flat. This mineral has a crystalline body and is nearly pure (98.5% purity). More than six million tons are extracted annually.

The production of nitrate and iodine is also significant, obtained by recycling old nitrate works in Huara and Pozo Almonte, as well as from new facilities such as Nueva Victoria.

=== Tourism ===
Tourism is highly important for the city as it represents one of its main projected economic resources. It offers essential natural attractions — a city beach safe for swimming thanks to the protection of the peninsula, a mild climate with pleasant temperatures, scenic desert landscapes, and convenient accommodations.

Its heritage architecture from the nitrate era also adds to its appeal. Iquique has one of the best-developed tourism industries in the country, with the hotel, restaurant, and commerce sectors accounting for 30.68% of the GDP.

=== Labor Organizations ===
Iquique has numerous and influential labor organizations, many affiliated with the Central Unitaria de Trabajadores (CUT). The most important include:

- Port workers’ unions
- ZOFRI unions
- Mining unions
- Commerce unions
- Public sector unions

Labor movements have also been historically strengthened by events such as the “Santa María Massacre” of December 17, 1907. The main union sectors are:

- Commerce
- Public employees
- Mining
- Construction, among others

== Transport ==
Iquique is served by Diego Aracena International Airport (Spanish: Aeropuerto Internacional Diego Aracena) (IATA: IQQ, ICAO: SCDA). The airport is on the Pacific coast 48 kilometers (30 mi) south of the city.

== Sport ==
Iquique is home to football team Deportes Iquique. It hosted the 2016 FIRS Women's Roller Hockey World Cup.

== Notable people ==
- Arturo Godoy (1912–1986) professional boxer, born in Iquique
- Tomasa del Real (1986) Neoperreo/Reggaeton artist
- Tito Ureta (1935–2012) biochemist, born in Iquique
- Juan Zanelli (1906–1944) racing driver, born in Iquique

== International relations ==
The city of Iquique hosts several international relations institutions, such as the Regional Unit for International Affairs (URAI) of the Regional Government of Tarapacá, responsible for the analysis and management of the region’s bilateral and multilateral relations with neighboring countries Peru and Bolivia, Latin America, and the rest of the world; the Commission on Tourism, Heritage, and International Relations of the Regional Council of Tarapacá; the regional office of the National Migration Service; the regional office of the General Directorate for Export Promotion (ProChile); the Department of Migration and International Police of the Investigations Police of Chile; and the International Relations, and Migrant Office of the Municipality of Iquique.

In the field of international relations and education, the main actors in Iquique are the General Directorate of International Relations and the Institute of International Studies of the Arturo Prat University.

=== Consulates ===
- Bolivia (Consulate)
- Brazil (Honorary Consulate)
- China (Consulate General)
- Colombia (Honorary Consulate)
- Spain (Honorary Consulate)
- Israel (Honorary Consulate)
- Italy (Honorary Consulate)
- Norway (Honorary Consulate)
- Netherlands (Honorary Consulate)
- Paraguay (Consulate)
- Peru (Consulate General)
- Sweden (Honorary Consulate)
- Turkey (Honorary Consulate)

== Gallery ==
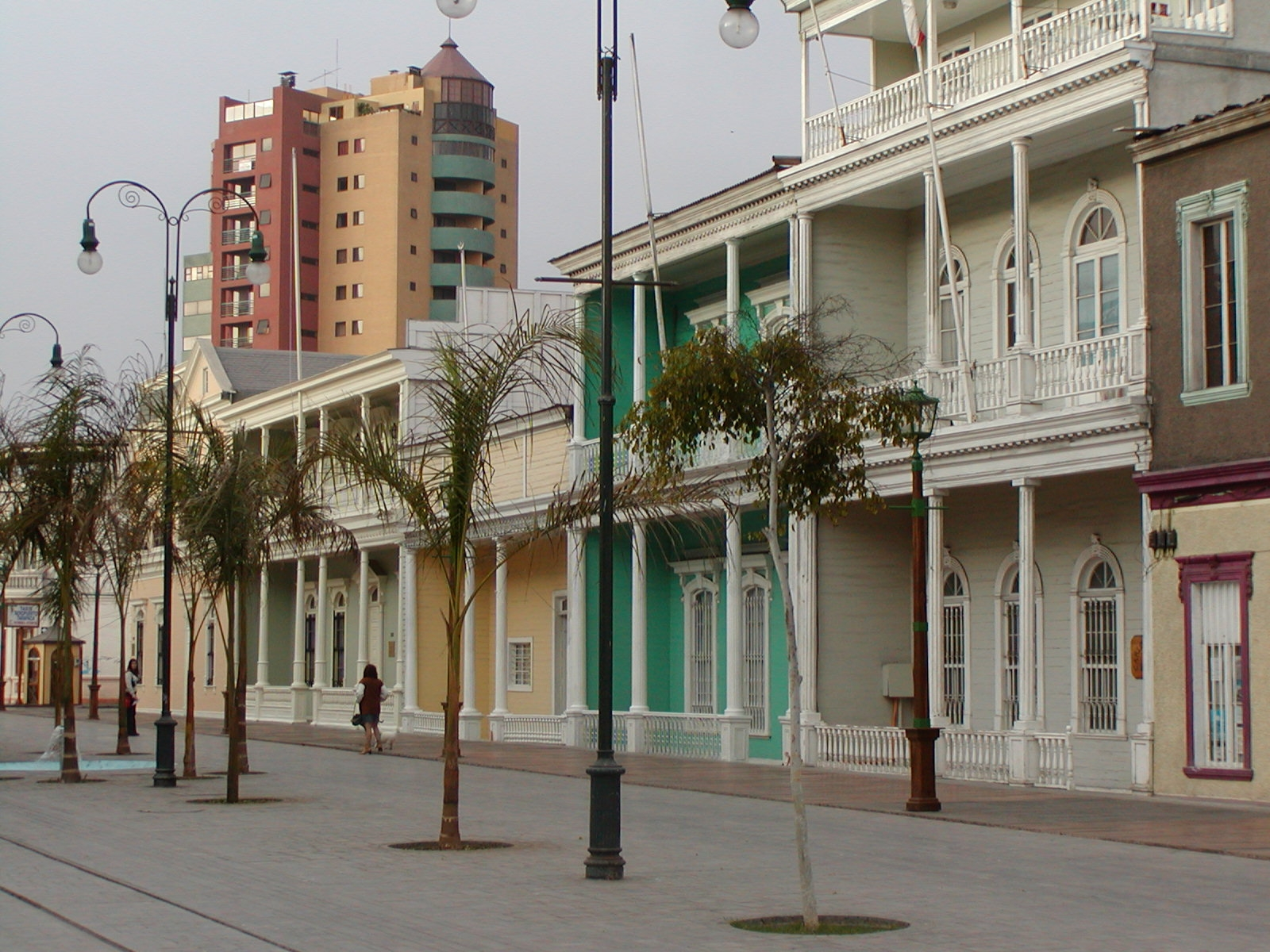
Baquedano Boulevard

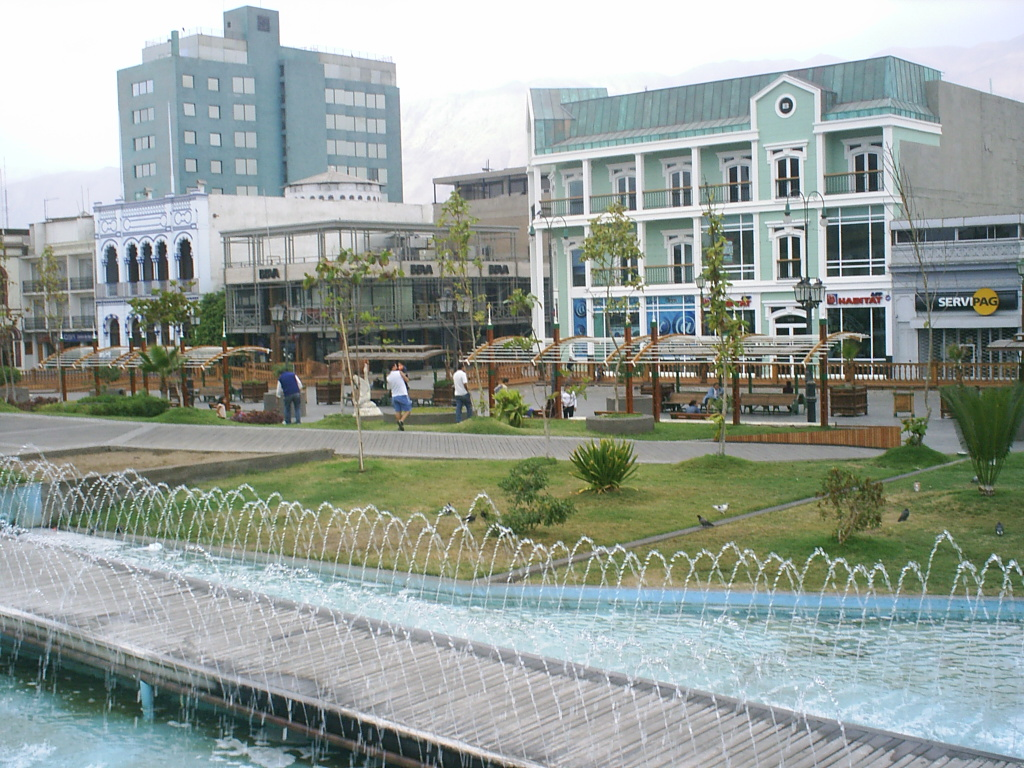
Downtown Iquique

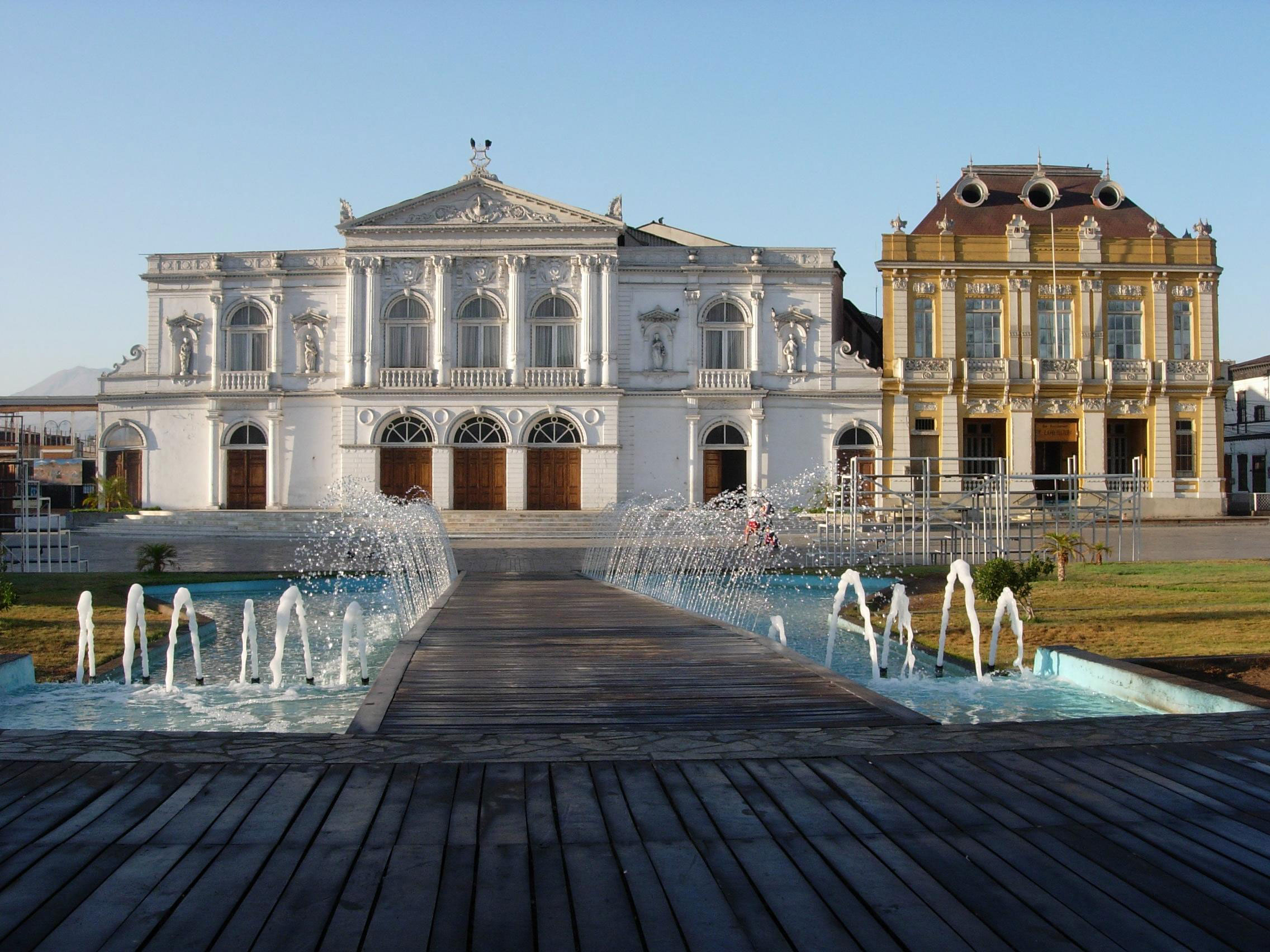
Municipal Theater of Iquique

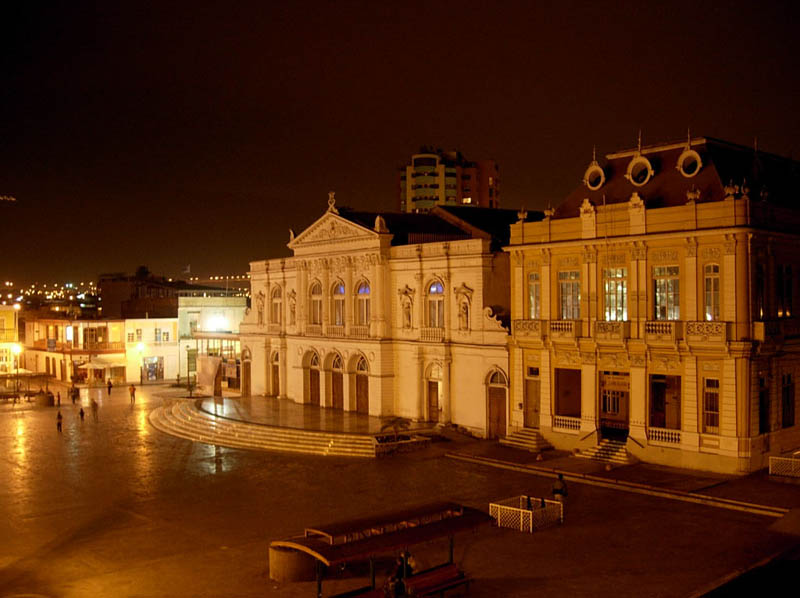
Iquique Municipal Theatre at night

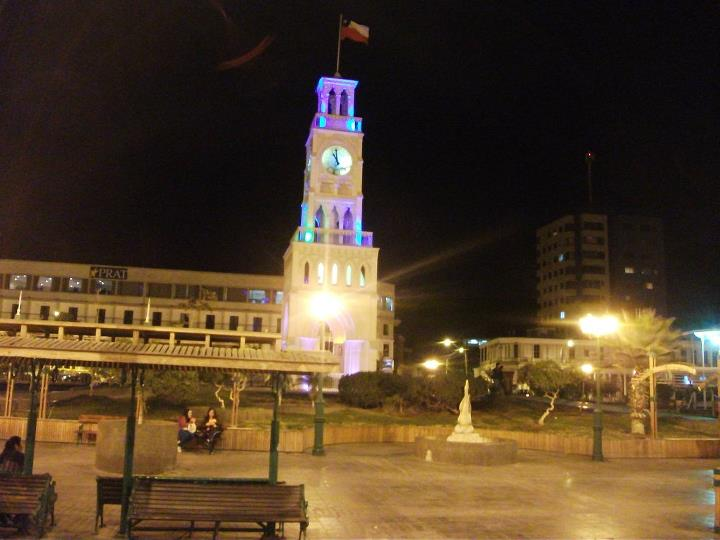
Plaza Prat

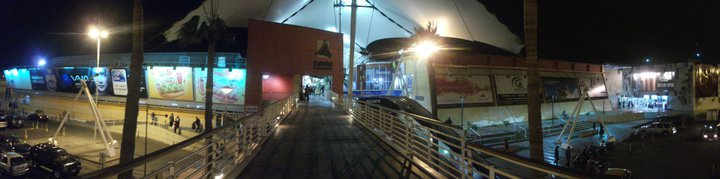
Mall Zofri at Night

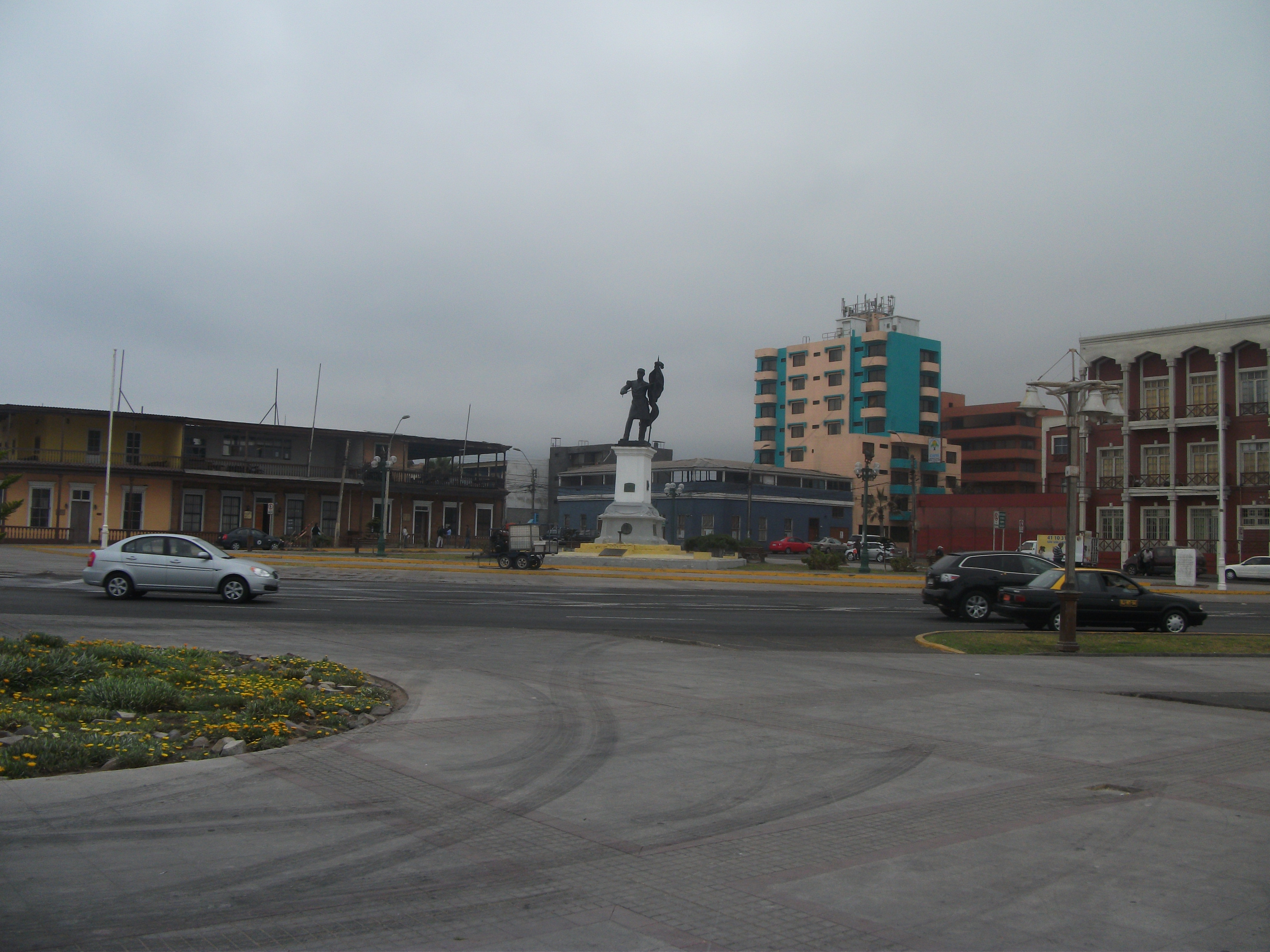
21-May Square

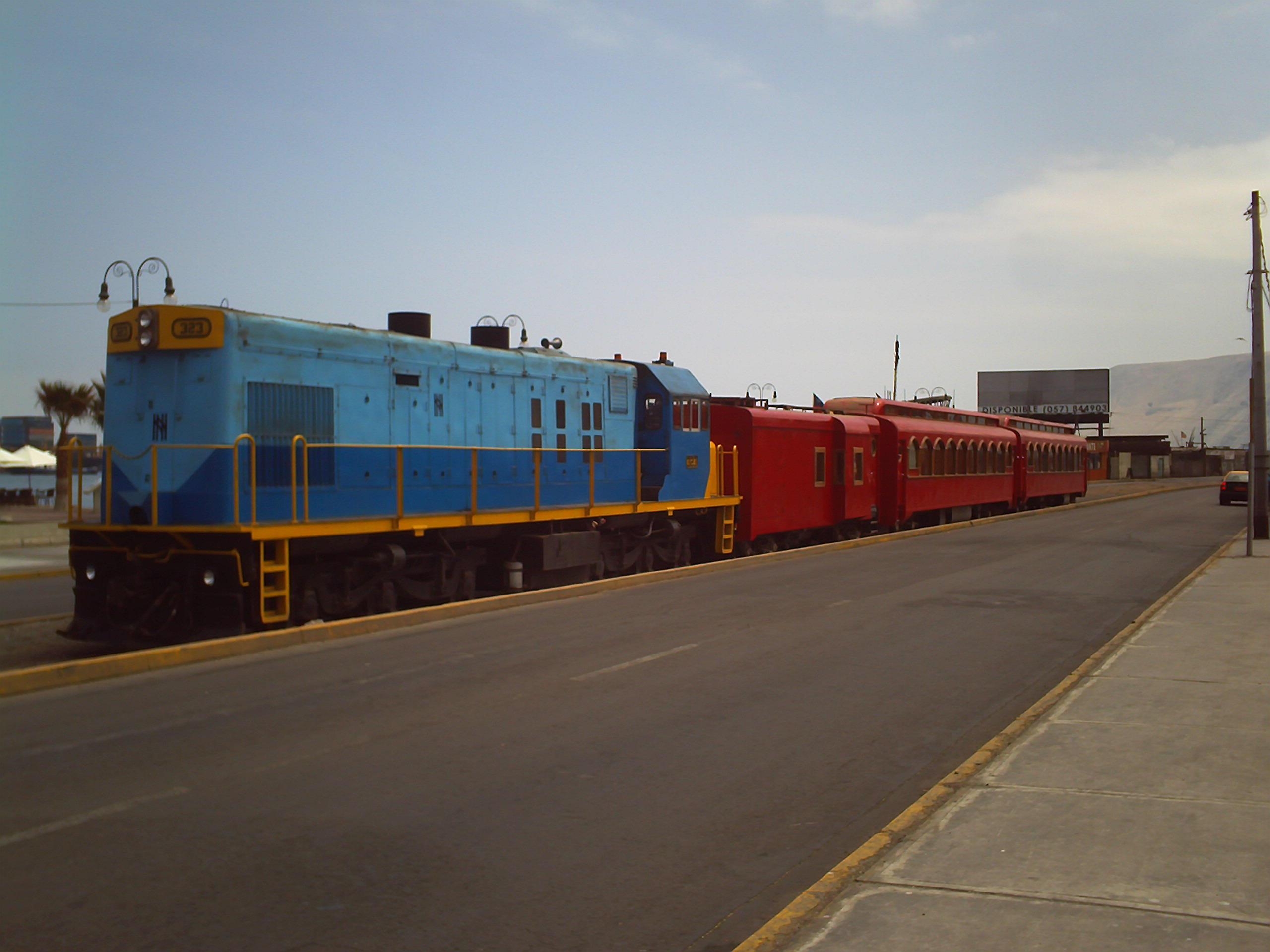
Trans-Atacama Tour Train

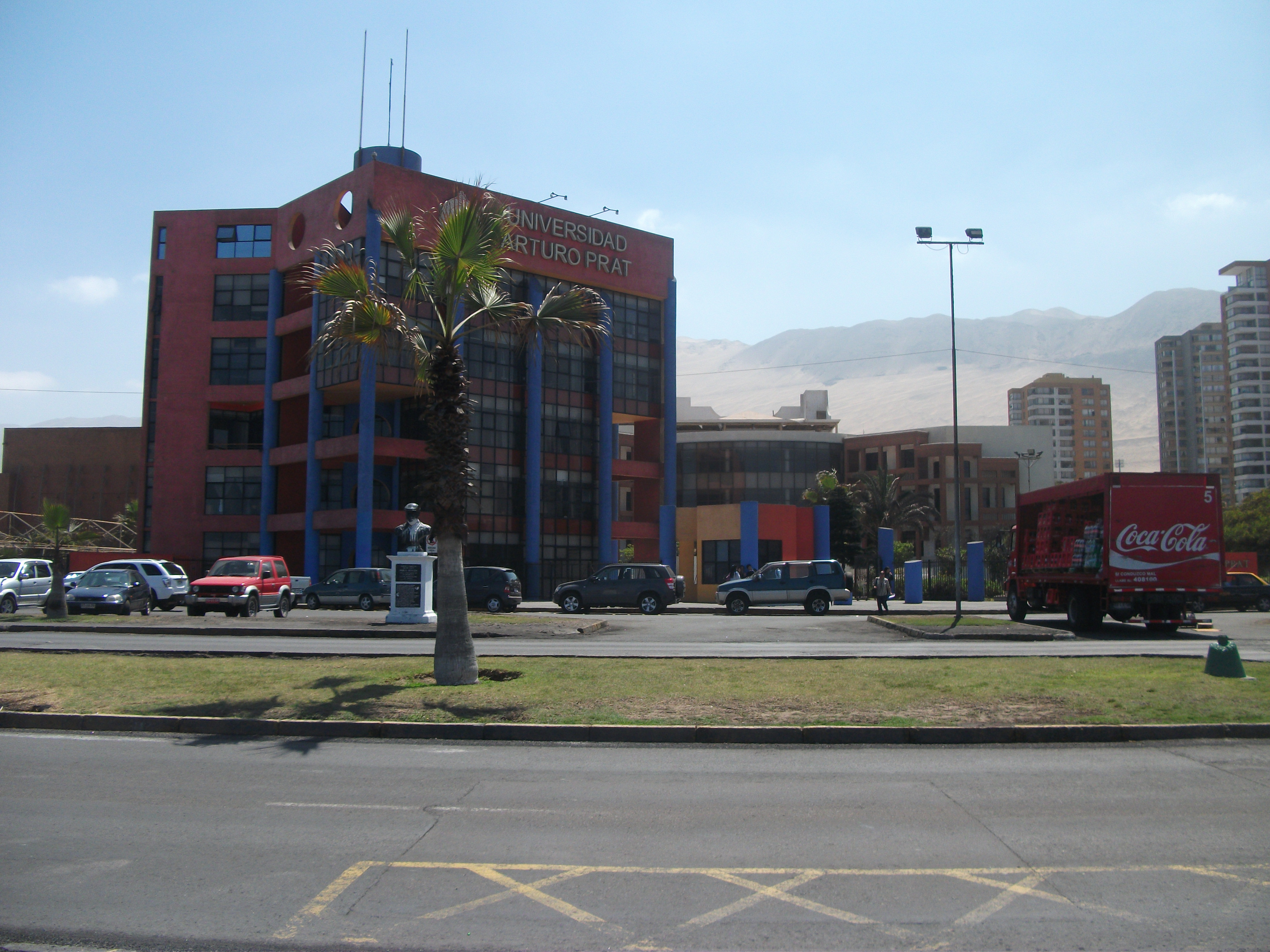
Arturo Prat University (Main campus from Chile)

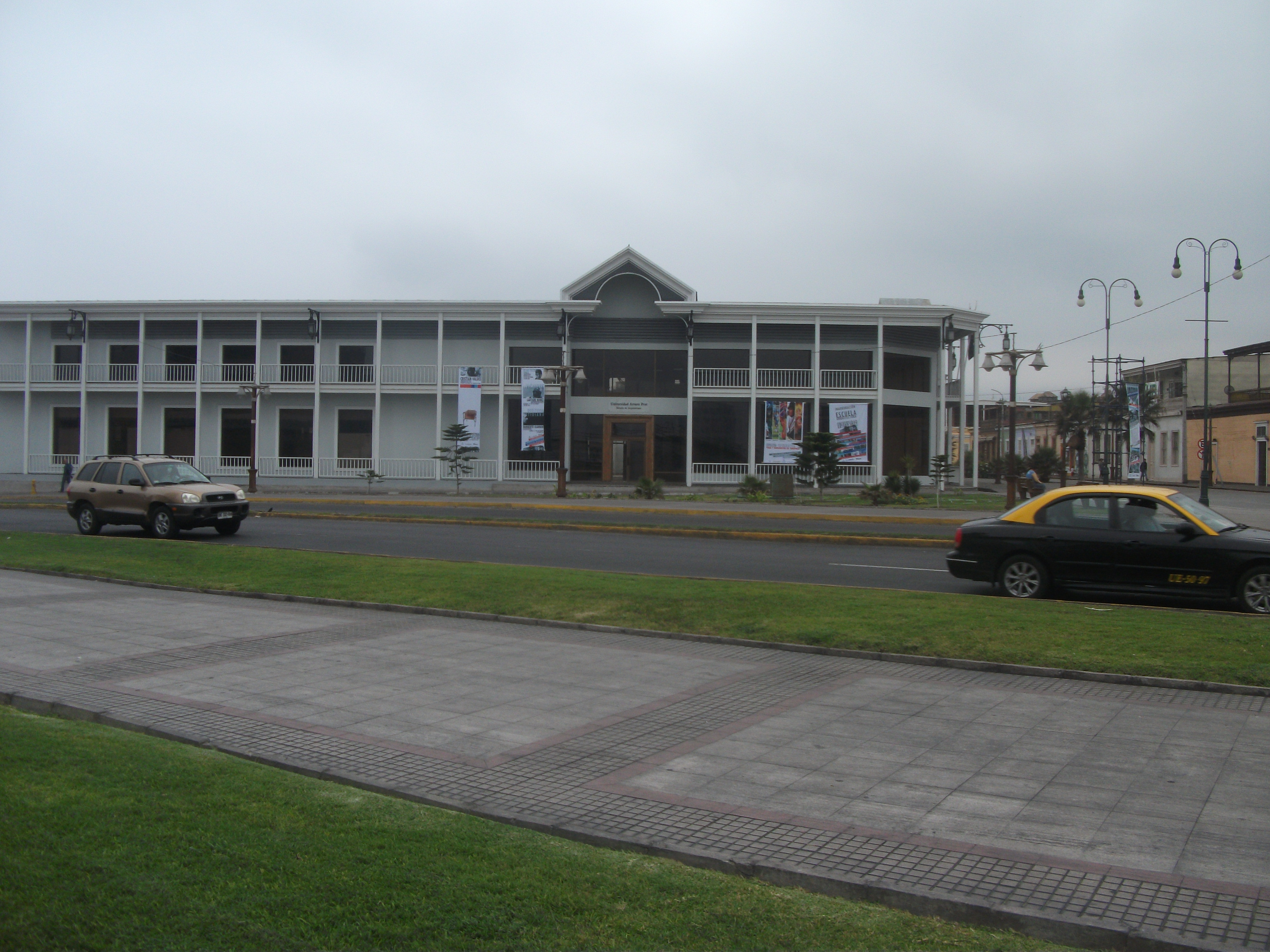
Arturo Prat University's Architecture-Faculty campus.

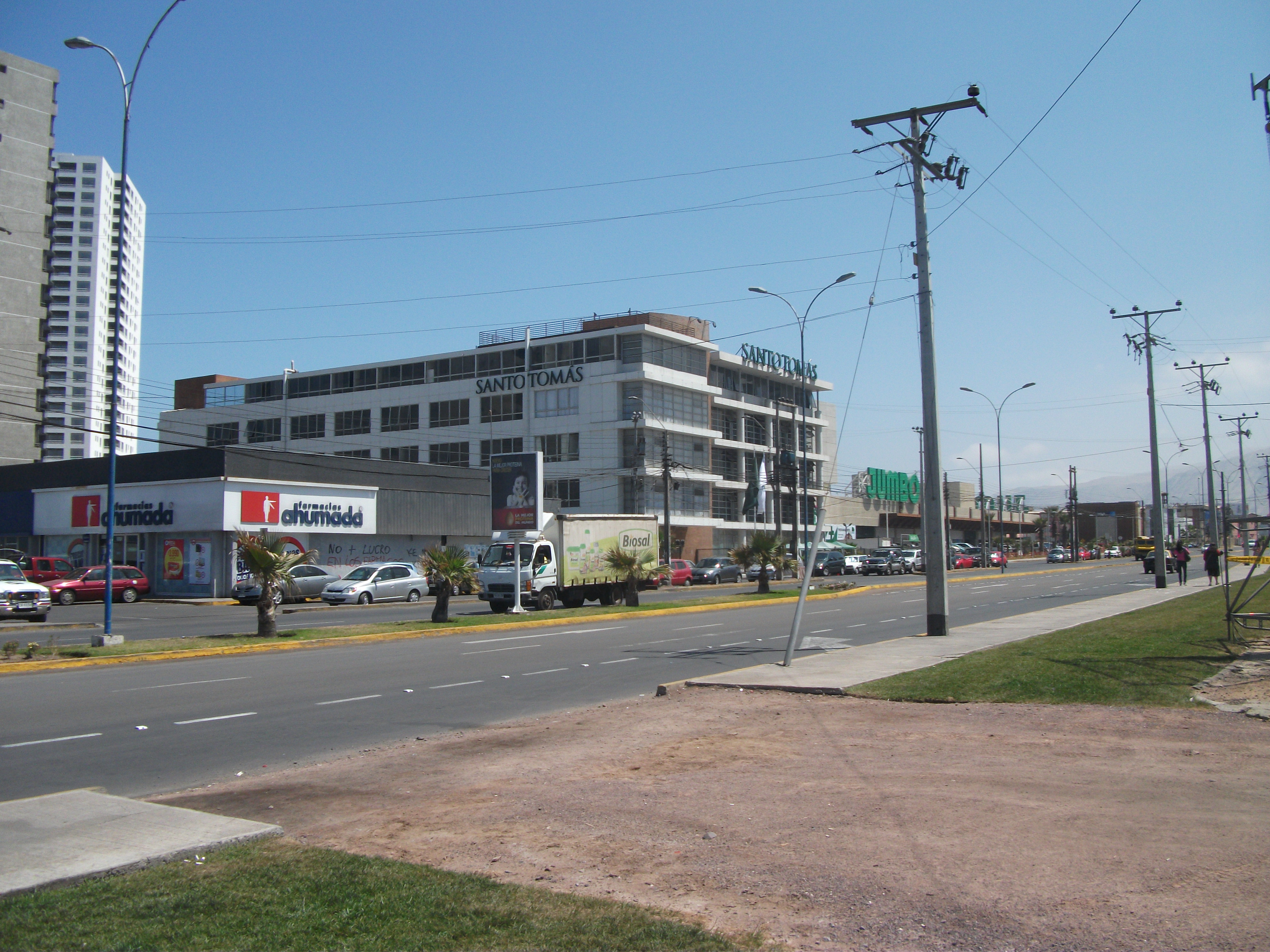
Santo Tomas University Iquique campus.

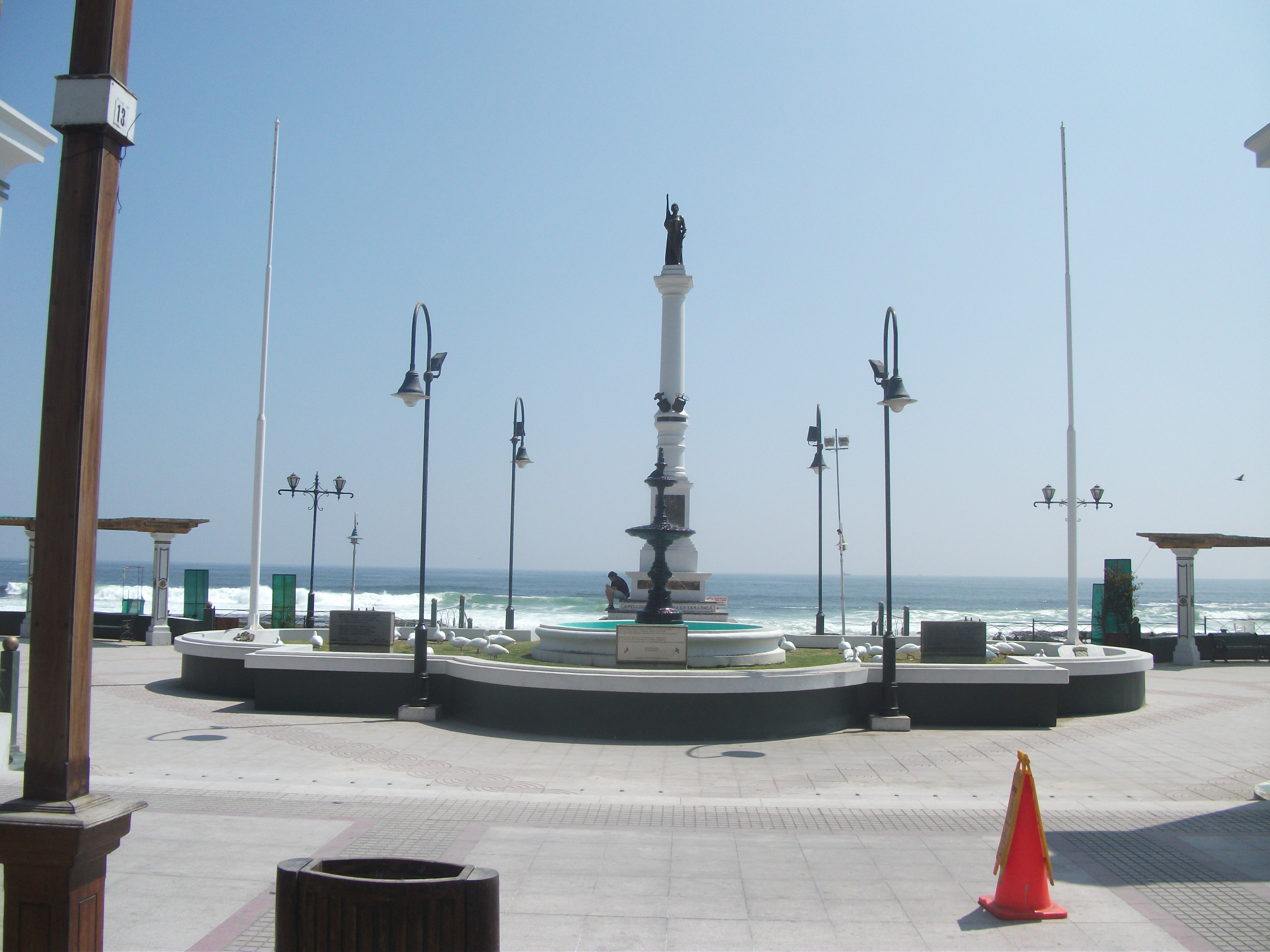
Slava Square .

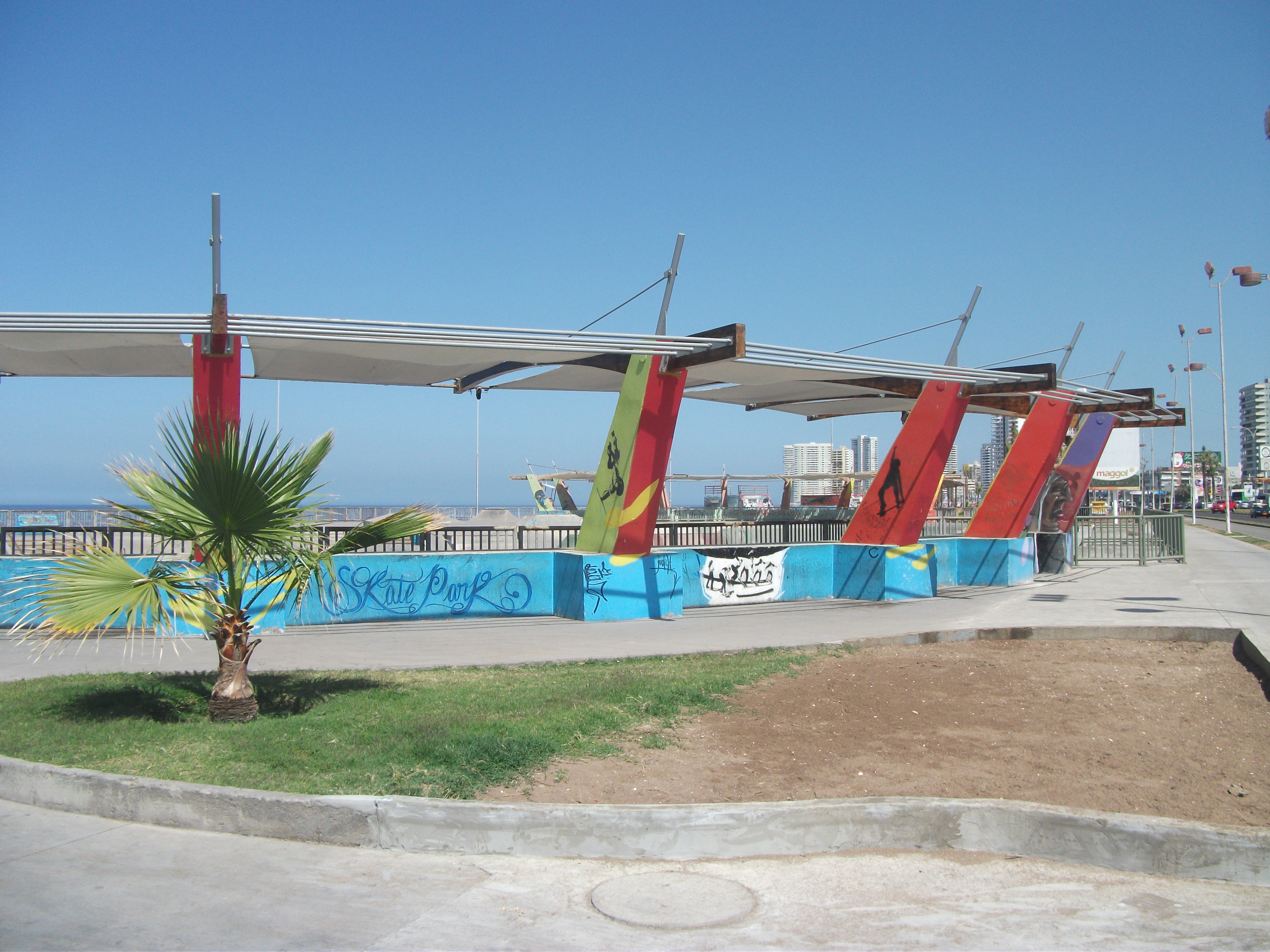
Iquique Skatepark.

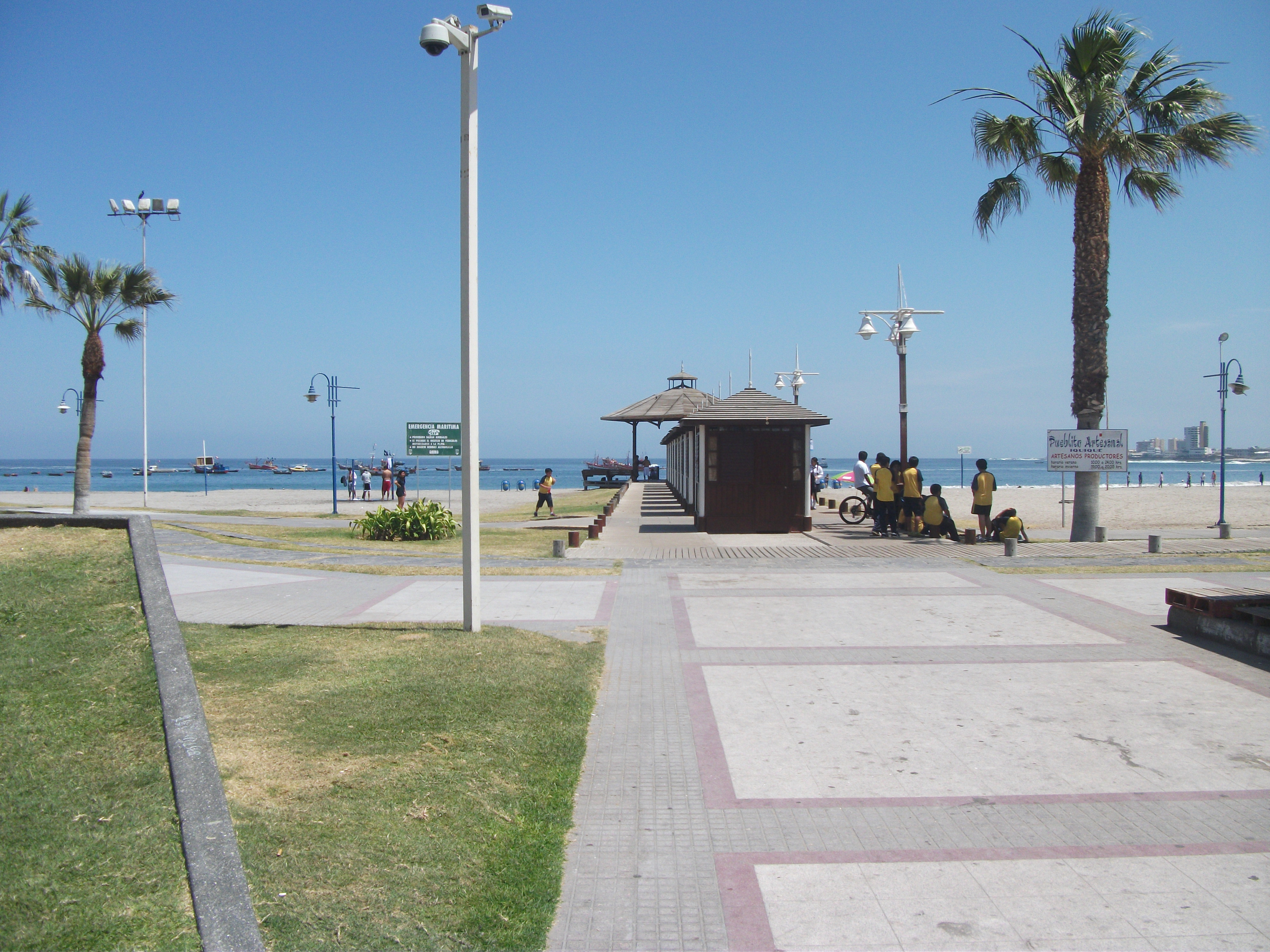
Cavancha Beach's Craft Market.

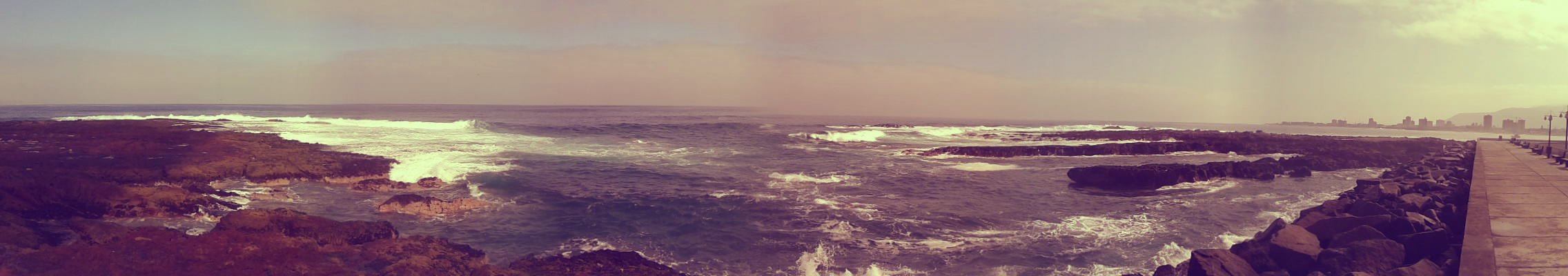
Cavancha beach at the end of Cavancha peninsula

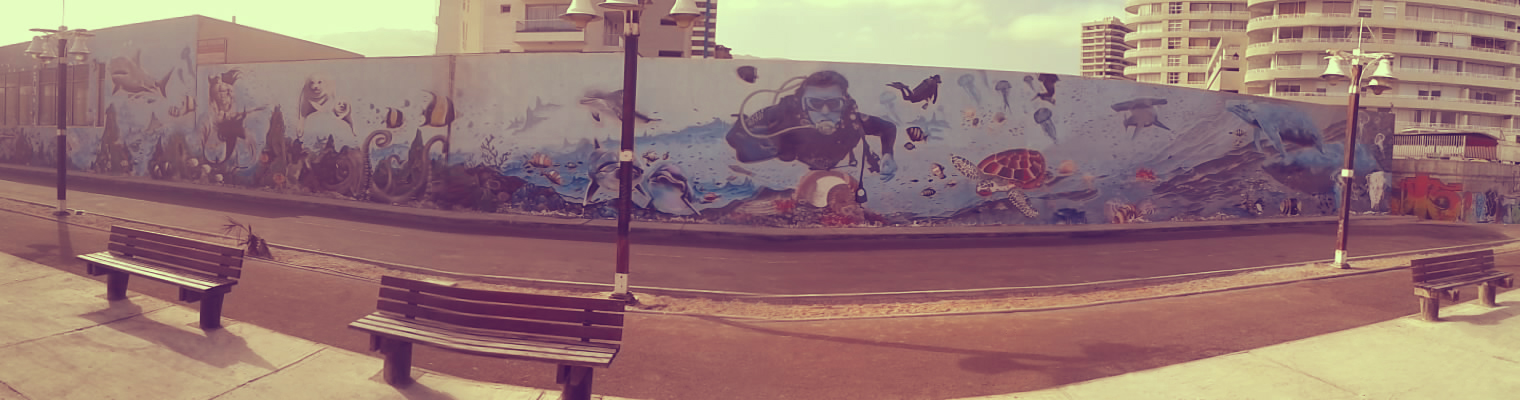
The underwater-themed mural situated in Cavancha Peninsula

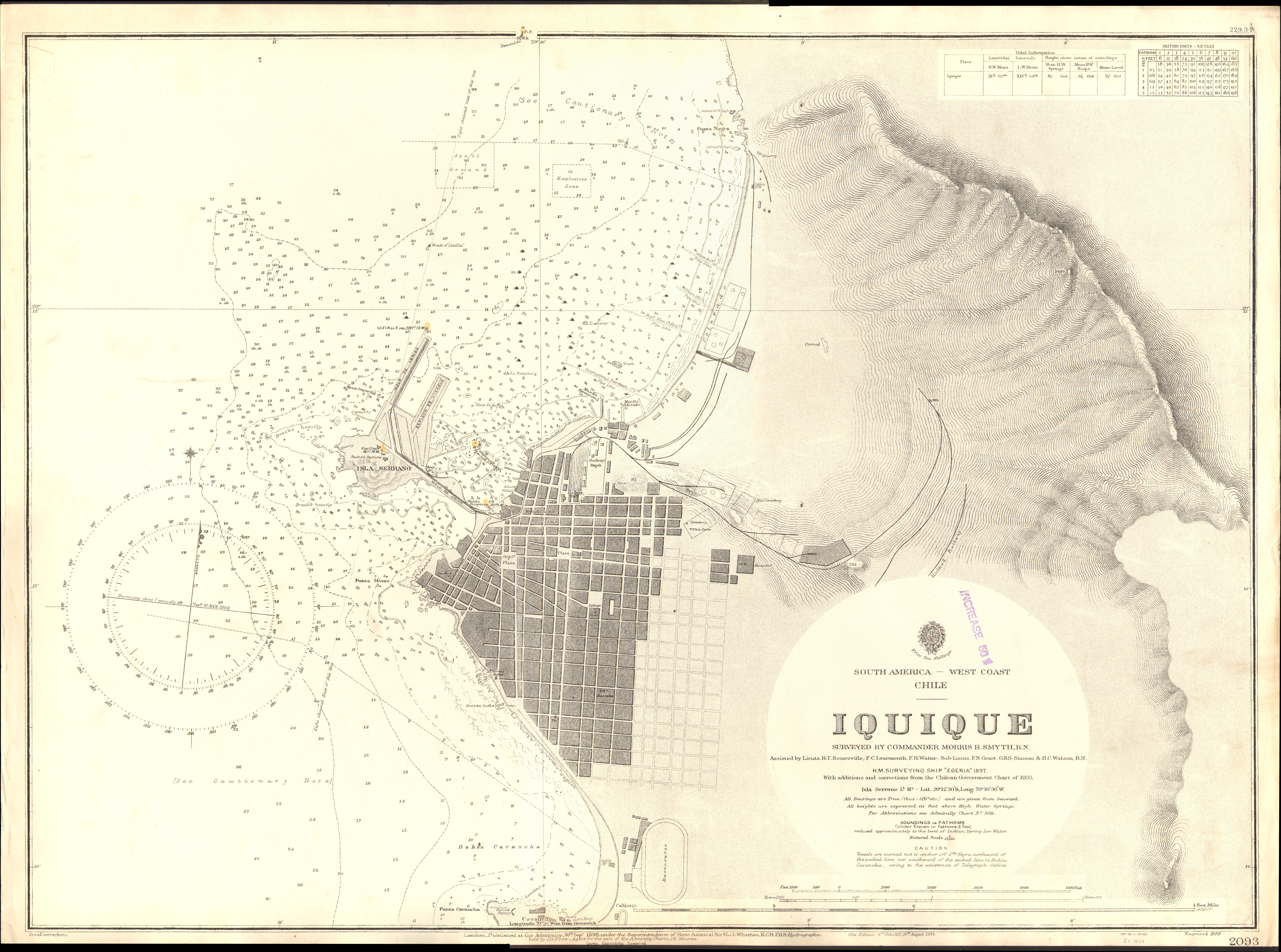
1934 nautical chart of Iquique
