= Iquique Province =

Iquique Provincia de Iquique
- Province
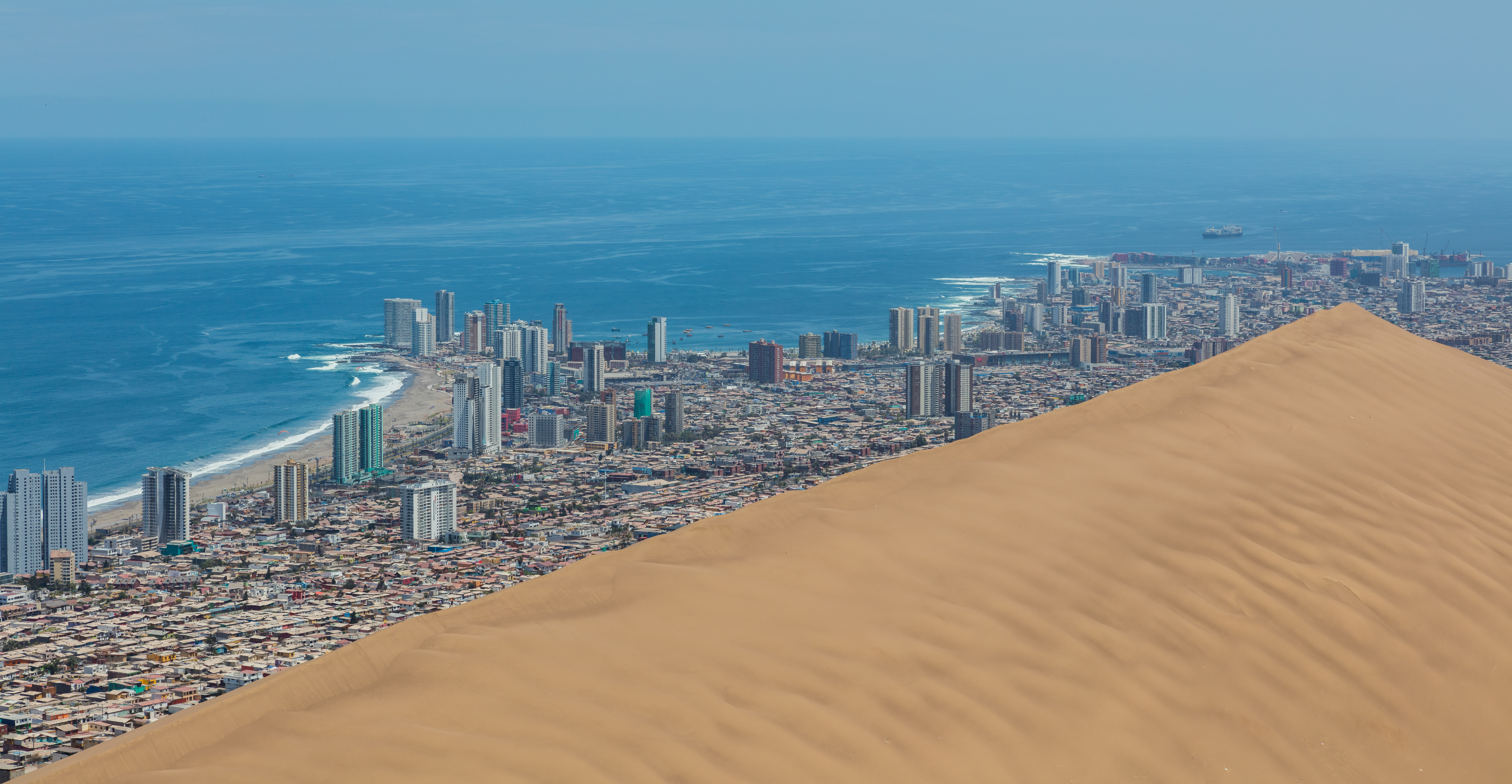
- Iquique

- Flag Seal

- Location in the Tarapacá Region

- Location in Chile
- Coordinates: 20°12′50″S 70°9′9″W
- Country: Chile
- Region: Tarapacá
- Capital: Iquique
- Communes: Iquique; Alto Hospicio

Government
  - Presidential Provincial Delegate: None

Area
  - Total: 2,835.3 km^{2} (1,094.7 sq mi)
  - Rank: 2

Population (2012 census)
  - Total: 275,042
  - Rank: 1
  - Density: 97.006/km^{2} (251.25/sq mi)
  - Urban: 214,586
  - Rural: 1,833

Sex
  - Men: 108,897
  - Women: 107,522
- Time zone: UTC-4 (CLT)
  - Summer (DST): UTC-3 (CLST)
- Area code: 56 + 57

Iquique Province (Spanish: Provincia de Iquique) is one of two provinces in the northern Chilean region of Tarapacá. Its capital is the port city of Iquique.

== History ==
Until October 2007, the Province of Iquique was composed of 7 communes: Alto Hospicio, Camina, Colchane, Huara, Iquique, Pica and Pozo Almonte, but since then, with the creation of the Region of Arica and Parinacota, much of the province, specifically the municipalities of Huara, Camina, Colchane, Pozo Almonte and Pica, was transferred administratively to Tamarugal Province, leaving Iquique Province consists of two communes.

== Geography and demography ==
According to the 2012 census by the National Statistics Institute (INE), the province spans an area of 2,835.3 km^{2} (1,095 sq mi) and had a population of 275,042 inhabitants, giving it a population density of 76.3/km^{2} (198/sq mi). Between the 1992 and 2002 censuses, the population grew by 30.8% (50,959 persons).

== Administration ==
As a province, Iquique is a second-level administrative division of Chile, which is further divided into two communes (comunas): the capital Iquique and its suburb Alto Hospicio. The province is administered by the presidentially appointed regional delegate.
