= Alto Hospicio =

- Commune
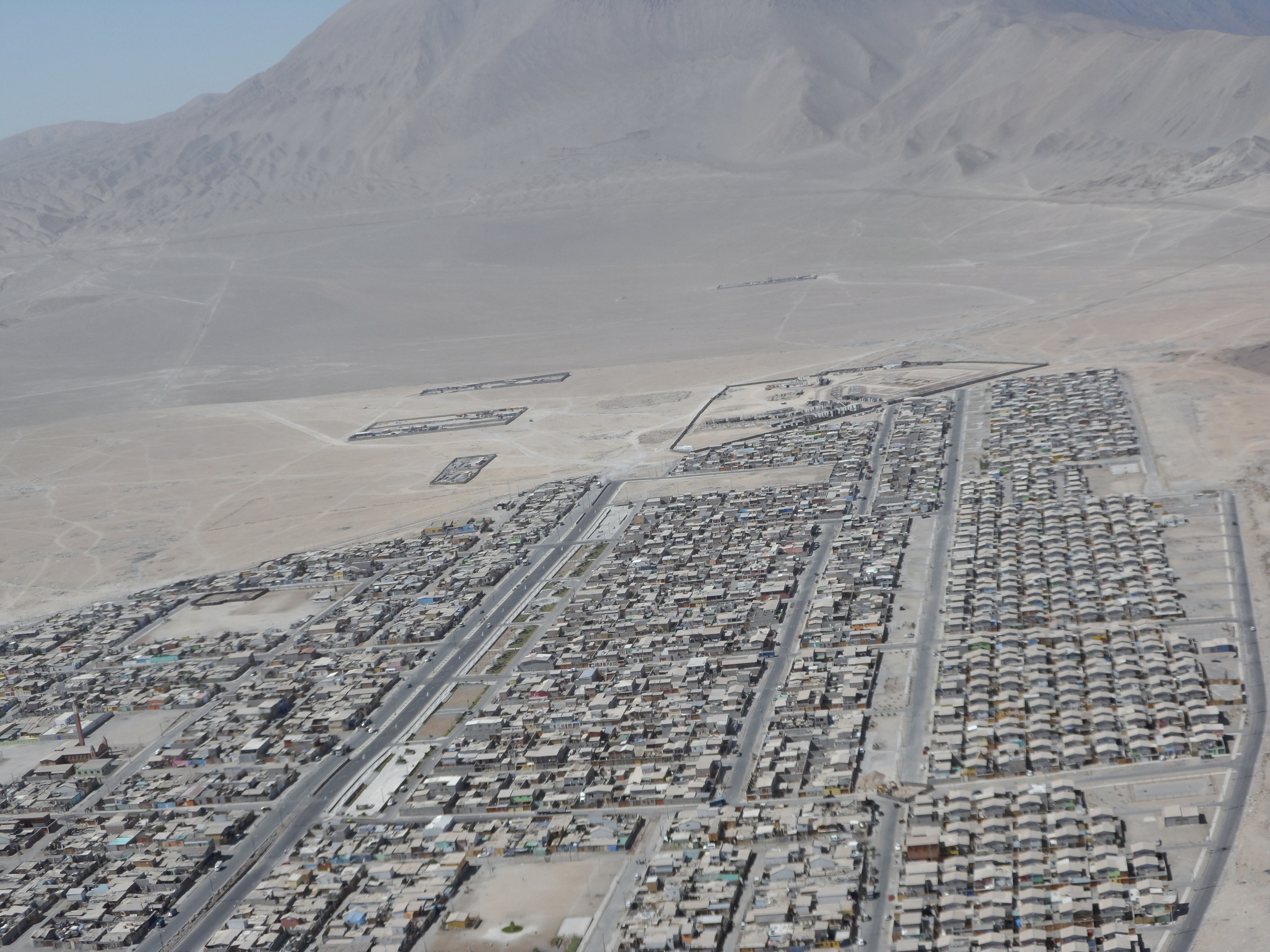
- Panoramic view of Alto Hospicio

- Flag Coat of arms Map of Alto Hospicio commune in Tarapacá Region Location in Chile
- Coordinates: 20°15′S 70°07′W
- Country: Chile
- Region: Tarapacá
- Province: Iquique Province
- Established: April 17, 2004

Government
  - Type: Municipal council
  - Alcalde: Patricio Ferreira (PDC)

Area
  - Total: 593.2 km^{2} (229.0 sq mi)
- Elevation: 600 m (2,000 ft)

Population (2012 Census)
  - Total: 94,441
  - Estimate (2012): 94,254
  - Density: 159.2/km^{2} (412.3/sq mi)
- Demonym: Hospiciano
- Time zone: UTC−4 (CLT)
  - Summer (DST): UTC−3 (CLST)
- Postal code: 1130000
- Area code: (+56) 5
- Website: Official website (in Spanish)

Alto Hospicio is a Chilean municipality and commune located next to Iquique, in the Iquique Province, Tarapacá Region. It is a fast-growing popular area in the heights of Iquique and has a population of 94,254 according to the preliminary result of the 2012 census. It is the second largest commune of the Greater Iquique urbanization with a total population of 275,000 in 2012.

== History ==
The first inhabitants of Alto Hospicio were the Chango indigenous group, that arrived from the coast. They climbed 550 meters from the cove of Ique Ique during the so-called Festival of the Mule (Bajo Molle), and stopped to rest on the pampa.

During reign of Tupac Inca Yupanqui (1380 - 1410 CE), the exploitation of the silver deposits of Huantajaya, located about 3 km (1.9 mi) northeast of the site of Alto Hospicio Central Prison, began. Exploitation of silver continued until the end of the eighteenth century when Basilio de la Fuente, a prominent resident of the town of San Lorenzo de Tarapacá, made a fortune with the mineral and funded major irrigation works.

After the War of the Pacific, Alto Hospicio was little more than a desolate train station (specifically the area of Alto Molle), where no more than 100 people lived. By the 1950s, groups of Aymara farmers settled in the area, bringing agricultural products from the inland altiplano. They constructed modest plots for small-scale horticulture and agriculture (both crops and livestock).

The economic boom experienced by Iquique in the mid-1990s brought about a population explosion in Alto Hospicio. It was transformed from a small town of about 2,000 inhabitants in the early nineties to a huge city with over 100,000 inhabitants. Alto Hospicio is 10 km (6.2 mi) away and 600 m (2,000 ft) above Bajo Iquique.

In August 2007 the Alto Hospicio Basic Emergency Hospital opened in La Pampa area of the city. Though originally part of Iquique, Alto Hospicio was incorporated as its own municipality on 12 April 2004, when Law No. 19943 was approved under President Ricardo Lagos Escobar.

Alto Hospicio hosts a large open-air market, La Quebradilla, which is open six days a week. The market trades in used clothing from around the world.

== Demographics ==
Preliminary results of the 2012 census indicate a population of 94,254 inhabitants of Alto Hospicio. According to the 2002 census of the National Statistics Institute, Alto Hospicio had 50,215 inhabitants. Of these, the vasy majority lived in urban areas outside Iquique, and only a tiny minority in rural areas due to its desert like surrounding. The population grew by nearly 900% (44,627 persons) between the 1992 and 2002 censuses and similar (90.7%) between 2002 and 2012 by about 44,000 inhabitants.

The commune of Alto Hospicio is composed of 4 census districts.

Census district			2002 Census			1992 Census		
#	District	Area (km^{2})	Urban	Rural	Total	Urban	Rural	Total
1	Autódromo	435.0	1,843	1	1,844	501	4	505
2	Alto Hospicio	4.1	31,687	0	31,687	8,915	0	8,915
3	Santa Rosa	118.6	7,328	24	7,352	2,553	11	2,564
4	Pampa del Molle	35.5	9,332	0	9,332	3,068	0	3,068
	Total	593.2	50,190	25	50,215	15,037	15	15,052

Source: INE 2007 report, "Territorial division of Chile"

== Climate ==
The climate of the area is coastal desert, similar to La Pampa, which is influenced by the dry climate and the Humboldt Current. It is characterized by abundant cloudiness, and low oscillation amplitude from autumn throughout the winter to the early part of spring. But this changes in summer when temperatures double and the oscillation increases, and temperature can vary considerably throughout the day. In the morning it may be sunny, but be very cloudy or rainy in the afternoon. The community receives some rainfall in summer, especially between January and February due to high air pressure fronts commonly called "Bolivia," negatively referring to cold Bolivian or Altiplano winters. Alto Hospicio also receives some rainfall in winter but not every year. Chile's climate is changing due to global warming. Alto Hospicio is a place where temperatures are not incredibly high, but sun rays can be very damaging. Average high in summer is 24 °C (75.2 °F) and 9.4 °C (48.92 °F) to 15 °C (59 °F) in winter.

Climate data for Alto Hospicio
Month	Jan	Feb	Mar	Apr	May	Jun	Jul	Aug	Sep	Oct	Nov	Dec	Year
Record high °C (°F)	34.4 (93.9)	30.2 (86.4)	26 (79)	27.2 (81.0)	28.4 (83.1)	25 (77)	22.9 (73.2)	21.7 (71.1)	25 (77)	28 (82)	29.9 (85.8)	31.2 (88.2)	34.4 (93.9)
Mean daily maximum °C (°F)	21.3 (70.3)	23.1 (73.6)	20.7 (69.3)	19.6 (67.3)	16 (61)	15.2 (59.4)	12.3 (54.1)	14.4 (57.9)	15.7 (60.3)	16.2 (61.2)	17.5 (63.5)	20.3 (68.5)	17.6 (63.7)
Mean daily minimum °C (°F)	18.6 (65.5)	15.3 (59.5)	13.8 (56.8)	13 (55)	12 (54)	10.6 (51.1)	8.7 (47.7)	7.4 (45.3)	12.1 (53.8)	14 (57)	15.7 (60.3)	16 (61)	13.1 (55.6)
Record low °C (°F)	11 (52)	14 (57)	12 (54)	8 (46)	3 (37)	0 (32)	−1 (30)	3 (37)	6 (43)	3 (37)	7 (45)	9 (48)	−1 (30)
Average precipitation mm (inches)	0.6 (0.02)	0.6 (0.02)	0 (0)	0.2 (0.01)	0.2 (0.01)	0.1 (0.00)	2.6 (0.10)	1.3 (0.05)	0.3 (0.01)	0 (0)	0 (0)	0.1 (0.00)	6 (0.2)
Source: Weather Underground

== Administration ==
As a commune, Alto Hospicio is a third-level administrative division of Chile administered by a municipal council, headed by an alcalde who is directly elected every four years. The 2008-2012 alcalde is Ramón Galleguillos Castillo.

Within the electoral divisions of Chile, Alto Hospicio is represented in the Chamber of Deputies by Marta Isasi (Ind.) and Hugo Gutiérrez (PC) as part of the 2nd electoral district, which includes the entire Tarapacá Region. The commune is represented in the Senate by José Miguel Insulza (PS, 2018–2026) and José Durana (UDI, 2018–2026) as part of the 1st senatorial constituency (Arica and Parinacota Region and Tarapacá Region).
