= District 20 (Chamber of Deputies of Chile) =

Electoral district of the Chamber of Deputies of Chile

- Distrito 20
- Electoral District for the Chamber of Deputies
- Location of District 20 within Chile
- Commune: List: Chiguayante; Concepción; Coronel; Florida; Hualpén; Hualqui; Penco; San Pedro de la Paz; Santa Juana; Talcahuano; Tomé
- Region: Biobío
- Population: 952,123 (2017)
- Electorate: 795,584 (2021)
- Area: 3,354 km^{2} (2020)

Current Electoral District
- Created: 2017
- Seats: 8 (2017–present)
- Deputies: List: María Candelaria Acevedo (PC); Eric Aedo (PDC); Roberto Arroyo (PSC); Sergio Bobadilla (UDI); Félix González (Ind); Francesca Muñoz (PSC); Marlene Pérez (Ind); Leonidas Romero (Ind)

District 20 (Spanish: Distrito 20) is one of the 28 multi-member electoral districts of the Chamber of Deputies, the lower house of the National Congress, the national legislature of Chile. The district was created by the 2015 electoral reform and came into being at the following general election in 2017. It consists of the communes of Chiguayante, Concepción, Coronel, Florida, Hualpén, Hualqui, Penco, San Pedro de la Paz, Santa Juana, Talcahuano and Tomé in the region of Biobío. The district currently elects eight of the 155 members of the Chamber of Deputies using the open party-list proportional representation electoral system. At the 2021 general election the district had 795,584 registered electors.

== Electoral system ==
District 20 currently elects eight of the 155 members of the Chamber of Deputies using the open party-list proportional representation electoral system. Parties may form electoral pacts with each other to pool their votes and increase their chances of winning seats. However, the number of candidates nominated by an electoral pact may not exceed the maximum number of candidates that a single party may nominate. Seats are allocated using the D'Hondt method.

== Election results ==
=== Summary ===
Election	Apruebo Dignidad AD / FA			Green Ecologists PEV			Dignidad Ahora DA			New Social Pact NPS / NM			Democratic Convergence CD			Chile Vamos Podemos / Vamos			Party of the People PDG		
Election	Votes	%	Seats	Votes	%	Seats	Votes	%	Seats	Votes	%	Seats	Votes	%	Seats	Votes	%	Seats	Votes	%	Seats
2021	47,636	13.75%	1	50,502	14.57%	1	14,379	4.15%	0	52,815	15.24%	1				118,934	34.32%	4	41,435	11.96%	1
2017	53,131	15.76%	1							69,097	20.49%	2	55,902	16.58%	1	129,804	38.49%	4			

=== Detailed ===
==== 2021 ====
Results of the 2021 general election held on 21 November 2021:

Party		Pact	Party														Pact		
Party		Pact	Votes per commune											Total votes	%	Seats	Votes	%	Seats
Party		Pact	Chigua- yante	Concep- ción	Coronel	Flori- da	Hual- pén	Hual- qui	Penco	San Pedro de la Paz	Santa Juana	Talca- huano	Tomé	Total votes	%	Seats	Votes	%	Seats
Independent Democratic Union	UDI	Chile Podemos +	4,567	17,517	3,734	1,512	4,489	1,610	2,467	7,050	1,005	8,418	4,263	56,632	16.34%	2	118,934	34.32%	4
National Renewal	RN	Chile Podemos +	3,496	11,507	8,209	369	4,504	720	1,844	5,316	669	6,832	2,490	45,956	13.26%	2	118,934	34.32%	4
Evópoli	EVO	Chile Podemos +	1,467	5,296	1,665	90	1,160	221	421	3,323	136	2,015	552	16,346	4.72%	0	118,934	34.32%	4
Christian Democratic Party	PDC	New Social Pact	1,379	6,866	1,331	117	1,927	280	2,640	1,964	203	2,051	1,385	20,143	5.81%	1	52,815	15.24%	1
Party for Democracy	PPD	New Social Pact	605	1,573	869	45	1,762	126	297	690	62	7,805	325	14,159	4.09%	0	52,815	15.24%	1
Socialist Party of Chile	PS	New Social Pact	3,485	2,187	864	123	1,091	285	439	647	81	1,136	515	10,853	3.13%	0	52,815	15.24%	1
Radical Party of Chile	PR	New Social Pact	620	2,241	939	62	928	239	325	858	81	1,018	349	7,660	2.21%	0	52,815	15.24%	1
Green Ecologist Party	PEV		4,817	14,028	4,204	278	4,647	837	2,209	9,887	391	7,293	1,911	50,502	14.57%	1	50,502	14.57%	1
Communist Party of Chile	PC	Apruebo Dignidad	1,261	4,355	2,908	50	1,427	319	636	1,562	519	1,852	822	15,711	4.53%	1	47,636	13.75%	1
Social Convergence	CS	Apruebo Dignidad	1,083	3,918	851	47	1,899	188	493	1,278	67	1,920	2,476	14,220	4.10%	0	47,636	13.75%	1
Democratic Revolution	RD	Apruebo Dignidad	882	3,315	619	475	1,007	172	421	1,096	90	1,441	365	9,883	2.85%	0	47,636	13.75%	1
Social Green Regionalist Federation	FREVS	Apruebo Dignidad	712	2,248	807	56	754	175	346	972	91	1,213	448	7,822	2.26%	0	47,636	13.75%	1
Party of the People	PDG		3,726	8,140	5,677	357	5,466	1,041	2,400	4,533	449	7,532	2,114	41,435	11.96%	1	41,435	11.96%	1
Equality Party	IGUAL	Dignidad Ahora	819	1,795	1,122	111	1,126	272	2,381	814	148	2,013	568	11,169	3.22%	0	14,379	4.15%	0
Humanist Party	PH	Dignidad Ahora	228	1,020	414	26	360	67	188	300	27	409	171	3,210	0.93%	0	14,379	4.15%	0
United Centre	CU	United Independents	1,114	2,867	1,314	168	1,629	443	661	1,480	202	2,363	686	12,927	3.73%	0	12,927	3.73%	0
Patriotic Union	UPA		677	1,609	1,032	174	839	261	449	785	158	1,393	530	7,907	2.28%	0	7,907	2.28%	0
Valid votes			30,938	90,482	36,559	4,060	35,015	7,256	18,617	42,555	4,379	56,704	19,970	346,535	100.00%	8	346,535	100.00%	8
Blank votes			1,901	4,347	2,710	423	2,273	850	1,340	2,310	690	3,408	1,746	21,998	5.66%				
Rejected votes – other			1,763	4,109	2,618	258	2,376	534	1,149	1,902	345	3,669	1,315	20,038	5.16%				
Total polled			34,602	98,938	41,887	4,741	39,664	8,640	21,106	46,767	5,414	63,781	23,031	388,571	48.84%				
Registered electors			68,015	200,269	90,394	10,550	77,313	20,705	42,186	91,391	13,026	131,721	50,014	795,584					
Turnout			50.87%	49.40%	46.34%	44.94%	51.30%	41.73%	50.03%	51.17%	41.56%	48.42%	46.05%	48.84%					

The following candidates were elected: María Candelaria Acevedo (PC), 7,016 votes; Eric Aedo (PDC), 10,712 votes; Roberto Arroyo (PDG), 9,458 votes; Sergio Bobadilla (UDI), 23,683 votes; Félix González (PEV), 30,168 votes; Francesca Muñoz (RN), 32,098 votes; Marlene Pérez (UDI), 18,510 votes; and Leonidas Romero (RN), 11,778 votes.

==== 2017 ====
Results of the 2017 general election held on 19 November 2017:

Party		Pact	Party														Pact		
Party		Pact	Votes per commune											Total votes	%	Seats	Votes	%	Seats
Party		Pact	Chigua- yante	Concep- ción	Coronel	Flori- da	Hual- pén	Hual- qui	Penco	San Pedro de la Paz	Santa Juana	Talca- huano	Tomé	Total votes	%	Seats	Votes	%	Seats
Independent Democratic Union	UDI	Chile Vamos	5,543	20,391	3,811	1,684	3,595	1,686	3,784	6,953	1,255	11,233	5,641	65,576	19.45%	2	129,804	38.49%	4
National Renewal	RN	Chile Vamos	3,477	11,525	11,291	339	8,082	671	1,873	5,426	491	6,447	2,235	51,857	15.38%	2	129,804	38.49%	4
Evópoli	EVO	Chile Vamos	1,353	4,403	735	84	753	201	459	2,402	134	1,324	523	12,371	3.67%	0	129,804	38.49%	4
Socialist Party of Chile	PS	Nueva Mayoría	3,549	7,086	3,329	225	4,350	698	1,858	3,023	334	14,440	2,309	41,201	12.22%	2	69,097	20.49%	2
Party for Democracy	PPD	Nueva Mayoría	942	2,055	811	236	5,828	600	653	1,052	163	4,962	445	17,747	5.26%	0	69,097	20.49%	2
Communist Party of Chile	PC	Nueva Mayoría	955	2,064	977	96	798	218	625	728	100	803	490	7,854	2.33%	0	69,097	20.49%	2
Social Democrat Radical Party	PRSD	Nueva Mayoría	556	552	218	25	162	76	101	217	31	219	138	2,295	0.68%	0	69,097	20.49%	2
Christian Democratic Party	PDC	Democratic Convergence	4,613	16,018	5,471	701	2,286	1,237	4,684	4,558	922	2,870	4,127	47,487	14.08%	1	55,902	16.58%	1
MAS Region	MAS	Democratic Convergence	846	1,358	2,165	101	628	150	862	719	92	821	673	8,415	2.50%	0	55,902	16.58%	1
Green Ecologist Party	PEV	Broad Front	2,381	8,016	2,041	203	2,499	496	1,268	7,257	222	3,228	1,056	28,667	8.50%	1	53,131	15.76%	1
Humanist Party	PH	Broad Front	1,974	7,126	3,398	127	2,042	337	807	2,270	345	3,017	1,187	22,630	6.71%	0	53,131	15.76%	1
Equality Party	IGUAL	Broad Front	187	545	152	14	203	37	102	148	30	292	124	1,834	0.54%	0	53,131	15.76%	1
Progressive Party	PRO	All Over Chile	892	1,157	558	189	656	489	406	539	190	2,114	379	7,569	2.24%	0	13,129	3.89%	0
País	PAIS	All Over Chile	464	1,586	673	103	424	214	444	457	100	699	396	5,560	1.65%	0	13,129	3.89%	0
Elias Ramos Muñoz (Independent)	Ind		1,208	3,620	1,232	87	1,441	259	603	1,512	177	1,898	665	12,702	3.77%	0	12,702	3.77%	0
Amplitude	AMP	Sumemos	389	656	390	86	340	192	218	318	133	492	253	3,467	1.03%	0	3,467	1.03%	0
Valid votes			29,329	88,158	37,252	4,300	34,087	7,561	18,747	37,579	4,719	54,859	20,641	337,232	100.00%	8	337,232	100.00%	8
Blank votes			1,886	4,212	2,446	414	1,713	907	1,290	2,116	711	2,708	1,868	20,271	5.37%				
Rejected votes – other			1,984	4,530	2,178	238	2,238	612	1,209	1,965	367	3,325	1,399	20,045	5.31%				
Total polled			33,199	96,900	41,876	4,952	38,038	9,080	21,246	41,660	5,797	60,892	23,908	377,548	48.88%				
Registered electors			64,745	199,158	86,427	10,199	76,227	19,339	41,331	80,495	12,313	133,151	49,053	772,438					
Turnout			51.28%	48.65%	48.45%	48.55%	49.90%	46.95%	51.40%	51.75%	47.08%	45.73%	48.74%	48.88%					

The following candidates were elected: Sergio Bobadilla (UDI), 18,432 votes; Félix González (PEV), 18,397 votes; Francesca Muñoz (RN), 23,165 votes; José Miguel Ortiz (PDC), 29,496 votes; Leonidas Romero (RN), 11,414 votes; Enrique van Rysselberghe Herrera (UDI), 28,757 votes; Gastón Saavedra (PS), 30,557 votes; and Jaime Tohá (PS), 8,145 votes.
