= Eric Aedo =

Chilean politician

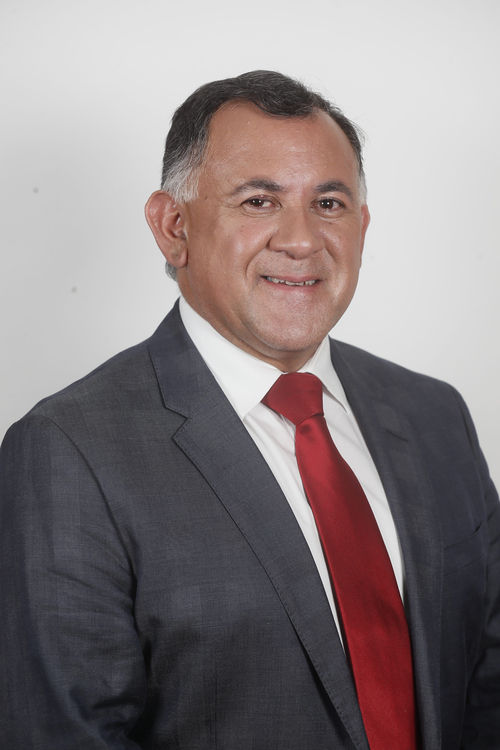

Member of the Chamber of Deputies
- In office 11 March 2022 – 11 March 2026
- Constituency: 20th District

Councilman of Concepción
- In office 6 December 2012 – 18 March 2014

Governor of Concepción Province
- In office 28 June 2007 – 11 March 2010
- Appointed by: Michelle Bachelet
- Preceded by: Rodrigo Díaz Worner
- Succeeded by: Carlos González Sánchez

Personal details
- Born: 13 July 1968 (age 58) Los Ángeles, Chile
- Party: Christian Democratic Party
- Spouse: Valeska Agurto
- Parent(s): José M. Aedo; Nora Jeldres
- Education: Catholic University of the Most Holy Conception
- Occupation: Politician
- Profession: Social worker

Eric Mariano Aedo Jeldres (born 13 July 1968) is a Chilean politician who serves as deputy.

== Biography ==
He was born in Los Ángeles on 13 July 1968. He is the son of José Mariano Aedo Arias and Nora Alicia Jeldres Flores. He is married to Valeska Agurto Contreras.

He completed his secondary education at Liceo de Hombres A-59—now Liceo Bicentenario Los Ángeles—in the commune of the same name. He later earned a degree as Administrator of Social Programs from the Catholic University of the Most Holy Conception. He also holds a master's degree in Politics and Government.

He also spent five years in the Society of Jesus, where he was preparing for the priesthood.

In March 2010, after serving as Governor of the province of Concepción, he joined the Strategic Development Department of the Catholic University of the Most Holy Conception. The following year, he assumed the position of Director of Student Support (DAE) at the same university.

== Political career ==
He began his political trajectory upon joining the Christian Democratic Party.

Between 2000 and 2006, he served as regional director in the Biobío Region of the Chile Barrio Program, providing housing solutions to nearly 3,000 families in the area.

On 28 June 2007, he was appointed Governor of the Concepción Province by President Michelle Bachelet, serving in that position until 11 March 2010.

In the municipal elections of 26 October 2008, he was elected as a councillor of the commune of Concepción for the 2008–2012 term. He obtained 3,817 votes, corresponding to 13.33% of the valid votes cast. He formally resigned from the position on 17 March 2014.

On 18 March 2014, he was appointed Regional Secretary (SEREMI) of National Assets by President Michelle Bachelet during her second term, serving until 11 March 2018.

On 29 November 2020, he was nominated in the primaries of the Constituent Unity pact as a candidate for Regional Governor of the Biobío Region. He obtained 7,843 votes, corresponding to 38.25% of the total votes cast. In the election held on 15–16 May 2021, he obtained 71,902 votes, equivalent to 14.27% of the valid votes cast, failing to advance to a second round.

After competing to become the first Regional Governor of the Biobío Region in Chilean history in the May 2021 elections, in July of that year he announced his intention to run for a seat in the Chamber of Deputies of Chile for the 20th District of the Biobío Region.

In August 2021, he registered his candidacy for the Chamber of Deputies representing the Christian Democratic Party within the New Social Pact coalition for the 20th District—comprising the communes of Chiguayante, Concepción, Coronel, Florida, Hualpén, Hualqui, Penco, San Pedro de la Paz, Santa Juana, Talcahuano, and Tomé. He was elected in November of that year with 10,712 votes, corresponding to 3.09% of the valid votes cast.

He ran for re-election in the same district in the elections of 16 November 2025, representing the Christian Democratic Party within the Unidad por Chile pact. He was not elected, obtaining 7,480 votes, equivalent to 1.27% of the total votes cast.
