= Félix González Gatica =

Chilean politician

Félix González
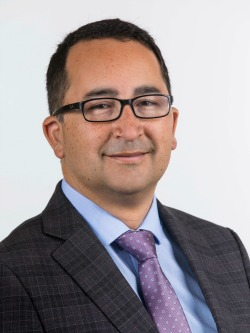

Member of the Chamber of Deputies
- In office 11 March 2018 – 11 March 2026
- Preceded by: District created
- Constituency: 20th District 20

President of the Green Ecologist Party
- Incumbent
- Assumed office 1 August 2014
- Preceded by: Alejandro San Martín

Regional Councilor of the Bío-Bío Region
- In office 11 March 2014 – 18 November 2016
- Preceded by: Creation of the office
- Succeeded by: Jaime Jara Araneda
- Constituency: For Concepción III Circunscription (Coronel, San Pedro de la Paz, Lota, Hualqui and Santa Juana)

Personal details
- Born: 26 May 1973 (age 53) Concepción, Chile
- Party: Green Ecologist Party
- Education: University of Concepción
- Occupation: Politician
- Profession: Public Administrator

Félix Marcelo González Gatica (born 26 May 1973) is a Chilean politician and public administrator who currently serves as a member of the Chamber of Deputies.

== Family and early life ==
He was born in Santiago on 26 May 1972, the son of Tomás Sixto González Pérez and Margarita del Carmen Gatica Sanhueza.

He is married to Raquel Rebolledo Flores.

== Professional life ==
He completed his secondary education at Liceo B-44 in San Pedro de la Paz (first to third year of high school) and at Liceo A-21 in Talcahuano, where he graduated.

He earned a degree in public administration from the University of Concepción, also obtaining a licentiate degree in political and administrative sciences. His undergraduate thesis was titled “The Deepening of Democracy: Consolidation and Strengthening of Political Institutions and Citizen Participation in Chile (1990–2003)”.

He has worked professionally as an academic and researcher.

== Political career ==
He became involved in the environmental movement in 1994 and the following year served as secretary-general of the Federation of Students of the University of the Bío-Bío. In 2001, he was treasurer of the Federation of Students of the University of Concepción.

He ran as an independent, non-aligned candidate for the Chamber of Deputies of Chile in the 2005 parliamentary elections for the former 44th electoral district of the Biobío Region. He obtained 4,284 votes, equivalent to 2.60% of the total votes cast, and was not elected.

In 2006, he became one of the founders of the Green Ecologist Party. On 5 August 2014, he assumed the presidency of the party and was re-elected in 2017 and 2019.

He again ran for the Chamber of Deputies in the 2009 parliamentary elections for the 44th district of the Biobío Region, obtaining 9,471 votes (5.64%) and was not elected.

In the 2012 municipal elections, he was a candidate for mayor of San Pedro de la Paz, receiving 4,165 votes, equivalent to 13.90% of the total votes cast, and was not elected.

He was a presidential pre-candidate of the Green Ecologist Party in the 2013 presidential election.

In November 2013, he was elected regional councillor for the communes of Coronel, San Pedro de la Paz, Lota, Hualqui and Santa Juana, in the Biobío Region. He obtained the highest vote count with 14,142 votes (13.24%) and served from 2014 to 2016.

In the 2017 parliamentary elections, he was elected to the Chamber of Deputies on the Broad Front list representing the Green Ecologist Party, for the 20th electoral district of the Biobío Region, comprising the communes of Chiguayante, Concepción, Coronel, Florida, Hualpén, Hualqui, Penco, San Pedro de la Paz, Santa Juana, Talcahuano and Tomé. He obtained 18,397 votes, equivalent to 5.46% of the valid votes cast.

In August 2021, he ran for re-election in the same district, representing the Humanist Green Party within the Apruebo Dignidad coalition. In November of that year, he was re-elected as deputy with 30,168 votes, equivalent to 8.71% of the valid votes cast.

In August 2022, he stepped down as president of the Green Ecologist Party following the appointment of a provisional national leadership during the party's re-legalisation process.

He ran for re-election in the parliamentary elections held on 16 November 2025, representing the Green Ecologist Party within the coalition of the same name. He was not elected, obtaining 25,421 votes, equivalent to 4.33% of the valid votes cast.
