= Leonidas Romero =

Chilean politician (born 1955)

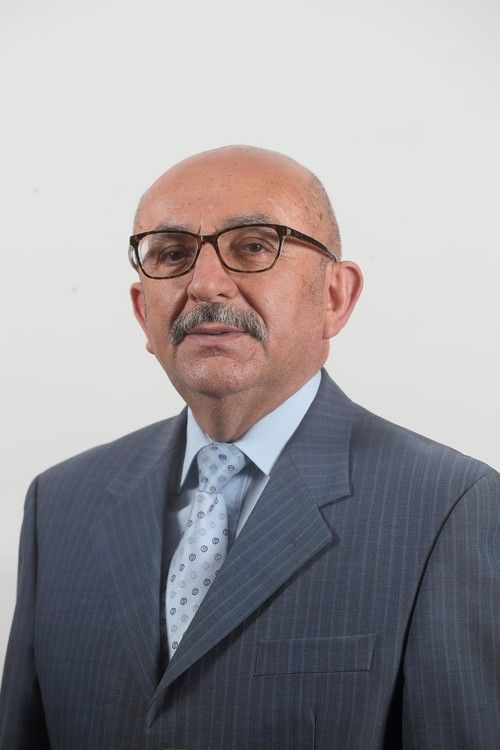

Member of the Chamber of Deputies
- In office 11 March 2018 – 11 March 2026
- Preceded by: Creation of the District
- Constituency: District 20

Mayor of Coronel
- In office 6 December 2008 – 6 December 2012
- Preceded by: René Carvajal
- Succeeded by: Boris Chamorro

Personal details
- Born: 15 October 1955 (age 70) Lota, Chile
- Party: National Libertarian Party (2025−)
- Other political affiliations: Independent Democratic Union (1991–2016); Renovación Nacional (2016–2021); Republican Party (2021–2023)
- Children: One
- Occupation: Politician

Leonidas Romero Sáez (born 15 October 1955) is a Chilean evangelical and conservative politician and member of the Chamber of Deputies. A member of the National Libertarian Party since 2025, he previously served as the mayor of Coronel from 2008 to 2012.

== Family and early life ==
He was born in Lota, in the Biobío Region, on 15 October 1955, the son of Leonidas Romero Valenzuela, a former coal miner at the National Coal Company (ENACAR), and Delfina Noemí Sáez Valenzuela, a shopkeeper and evangelical pastor.

He is married to Débora Parra Tassara and has one daughter, Valentina.

== Professional life ==
He completed his primary education at San Juan School in Lota and his secondary education at Antonio Salamanca Morales High School (A-49) in Coronel, graduating in 1973.

He pursued higher education at the Diego Portales Professional Institute in Concepción, where he obtained a technical degree in business administration.

For over 25 years, he has worked as a merchant in the hardware and timber trade sectors.

== Political career ==
He is a former member of both National Renewal and the Independent Democratic Union.

In the 2000 municipal elections, he was elected as a municipal councillor of Coronel, receiving 4,881 votes, equivalent to 12.16% of the total votes cast.

He subsequently served as mayor of Coronel for two consecutive terms between 2008 and 2016. In the 2008 municipal elections, he ran as an independent candidate and obtained 16,789 votes, representing 42.14% of the votes. He was re-elected in the 2012 municipal elections, again as an independent, with 17,384 votes, equivalent to 44.96% of the total votes cast.

In the 2017 parliamentary elections, he was elected deputy for the 20th electoral district of the Biobío Region—comprising the communes of Chiguayante, Concepción, Coronel, Florida, Hualpén, Hualqui, Penco, San Pedro de la Paz, Santa Juana, Talcahuano, and Tomé—representing National Renewal within the Chile Vamos coalition for the 2018–2022 term. He obtained 11,414 votes, corresponding to 3.38% of the valid votes cast.

In August 2021, he sought re-election in the same district representing National Renewal within the Chile Podemos Más coalition for the 2022–2026 term. He was re-elected in the November elections with 11,778 votes, equivalent to 3.40% of the valid votes cast.

On 28 December 2021, he resigned from National Renewal.

Since January 2025, he has been a member of the National Libertarian Party.

== Other activities ==
He held leadership roles within the Coronel Chamber of Commerce, serving as treasurer for two years and as president for eight years.
