= Roberto Enrique Arroyo =

Chilean politician

Roberto Arroyo
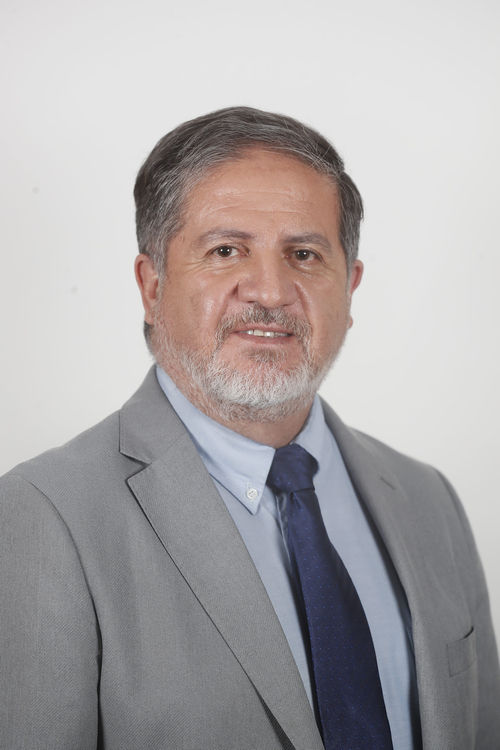

Member of the Chamber of Deputies
- Incumbent
- Assumed office 11 March 2022
- Constituency: District 20

Personal details
- Born: 20 November 1963 (age 62) Concepción, Chile
- Party: Party of the People; Christian Social Party
- Spouse: Rosa Fuentealba
- Parent(s): Luis Arroyo; Sara Muñoz
- Education: University of Concepción
- Occupation: Politician
- Profession: Odontologist

Roberto Enrique Arroyo Muñoz (born 29 November 1963) is a Chilean politician who serves as deputy.

== Biography ==
Arroyo was born on 29 November 1963 in Concepción, Chile. He is the son of Luis Arroyo Venegas and Sara del Carmen Muñoz Cancino. His siblings are Sergio, Luis, Raúl, Gladys, Dina, Mily, and Andrés Arroyo Muñoz.

He studied Dentistry at the University of Concepción, where he obtained a Licentiate in Dentistry and the professional degree of Dental Surgeon in 1989. A decade later, in 1999, he specialized in Orthodontics at the same university.

In 2010, he completed postgraduate diplomas in Aesthetic Dentistry and Prosthetic Surgical Implantology, also at the University of Concepción. His academic career has been complemented by teaching and scientific outreach activities; he is an international lecturer and has served as a visiting professor at universities in Mexico and Paraguay.

In 2023, he obtained a Diploma in Public Management from the Metropolitan Technological University (UTEM). He is currently pursuing a Master’s degree in Public Policy at the Universidad del Desarrollo.

== Political career ==
In his public trajectory, his participation in the Vicariate of Solidarity during the 1980s stands out. He took part in the implementation of a dental rehabilitation program for women at El Manzano Prison in Concepción. In the professional sphere, he served as president of the Oncology and Reconstructive Foundation and of the Ibero-Latin American International Dental Federation, headquartered in Mexico.

As a member of the Party of the People (PDG), in August 2021 he presented his candidacy for the Chamber of Deputies of Chile for the 20th District—comprising the communes of Chiguayante, Concepción, Coronel, Florida, Hualpén, Hualqui, Penco, San Pedro de la Paz, Santa Juana, Talcahuano, and Tomé—in the Biobío Region, for the 2022–2026 term. On 21 November of that year, he was elected as a deputy with 9,458 votes, corresponding to 2.73% of the valid votes cast.

On 13 December 2022, he ceased to be a member of the Party of the People, and in 2023 he joined the Christian Social Party.
