= Marlene Pérez (politician) =

Chilean politician

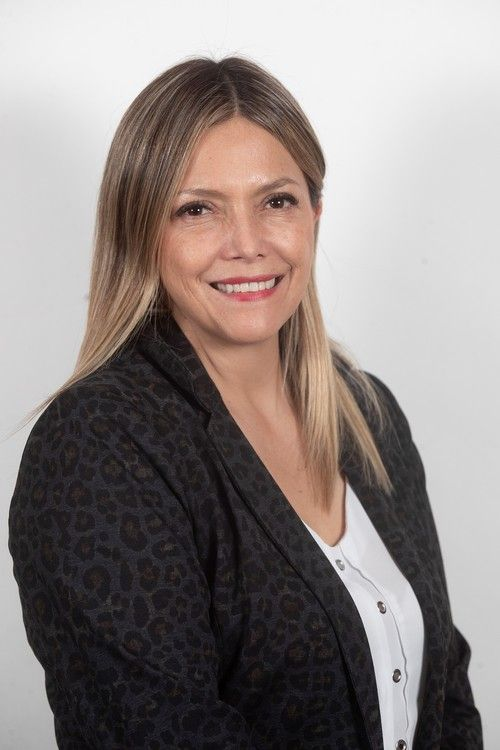

Member of the Chamber of Deputies
- In office 11 March 2022 – 11 March 2030
- Constituency: District 20

Personal details
- Born: 10 May 1973 (age 53) Talcahuano, Chile
- Party: Independent
- Children: Three
- Parent(s): Héctor Pérez; Delmira Cartes
- Occupation: Politician

Marlene Pérez Cartes (born 10 May 1973) is a Chilean politician serving as a member of the Chamber of Deputies of Chile.

== Family and early life ==
Pérez was born on 10 May 1973 in Talcahuano to Héctor Pérez Opazo and Delmira Cartes Aguilera. She has three children.

== Professional life ==
Pérez graduating from José Manuel Balmaceda Adult High School, Concepción, qualifying in social work. She has presented on Concepción's radio stations Radio Femenina and Punto 7 in Concepción, and El Conquistador, and Canal 9 Bío Bío Televisión, hosting Cuenta Conmigo. She also worked as an advisor to the Biobío Region's Agency for Sustainability and Climate Change (ASCC).

== Political career ==
Pérez aligns politically with the Independent Democratic Union (UDI). She ran as a Biobío regional councillor in 2017, followed by UDI supported independent for the 2018–2022 term. She was elected with 19,596 votes, representing 8.32% of the valid votes cast. She resigned on 25 October 2019 to contest the municipal elections.

On 14 September 2020, she confirmed she would stand as mayor of Concepción, again as a UDI backed independent within the Chile Vamos coalition. She was not elected, obtaining 17,827 votes in the election the following May with a share of 22.40%.

In August 2021 she announced she would stand for Chamber of Deputies of Chile, as an independent backed by the Chile Podemos Más pact, representing the 20th electoral district (Chiguayante, Concepción, Coronel, Florida, Hualpén, Hualqui, Penco, San Pedro de la Paz, Santa Juana, Talcahuano and Tomé), in the Biobío Region, for the 2022–2026 term. On 21 November, she was elected deputy with 18,510 votes, taking 5.34% of the vote.
