= Greater Concepción =

Gran Concepción
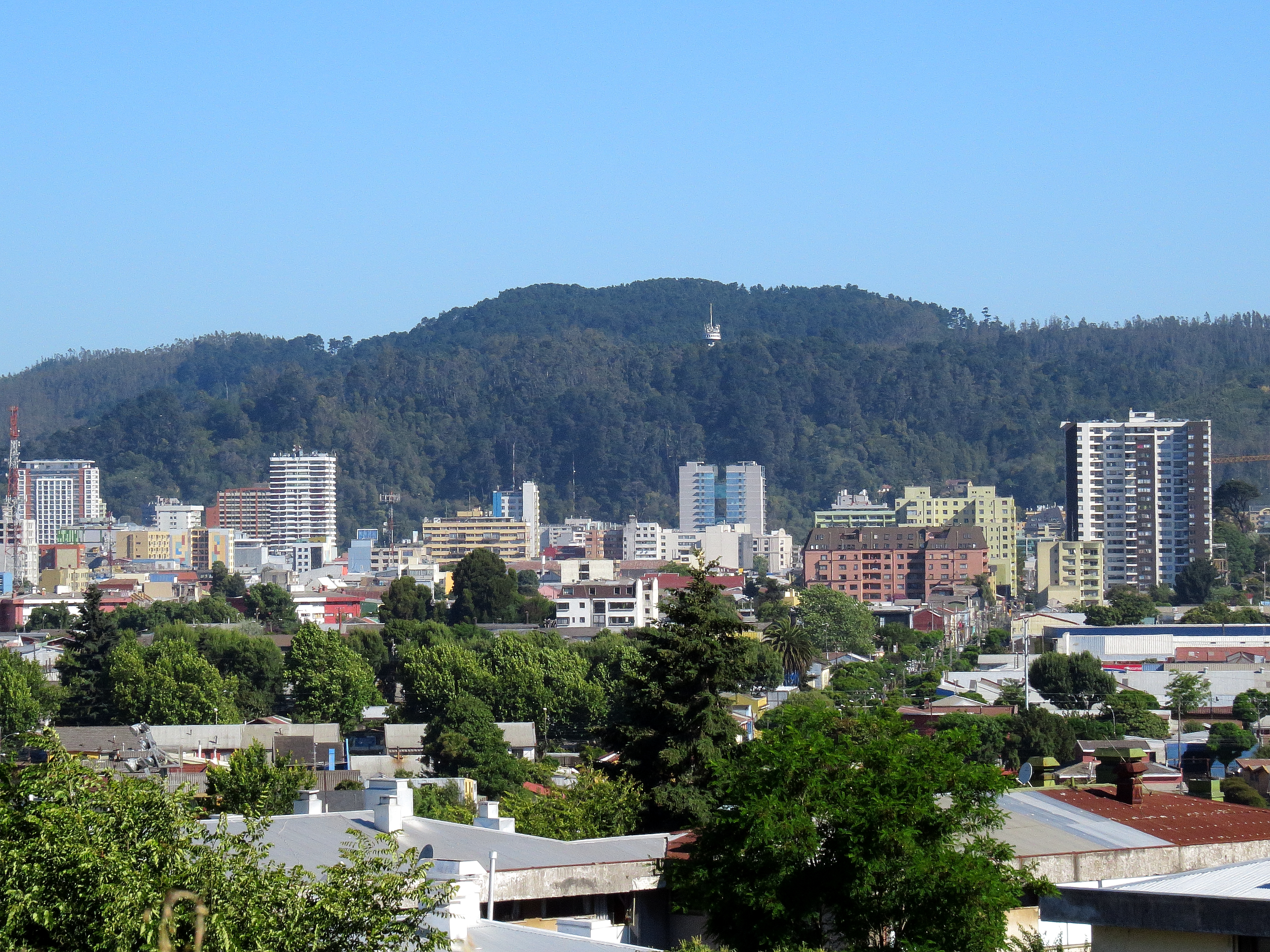
- Nickname: Pencopolis
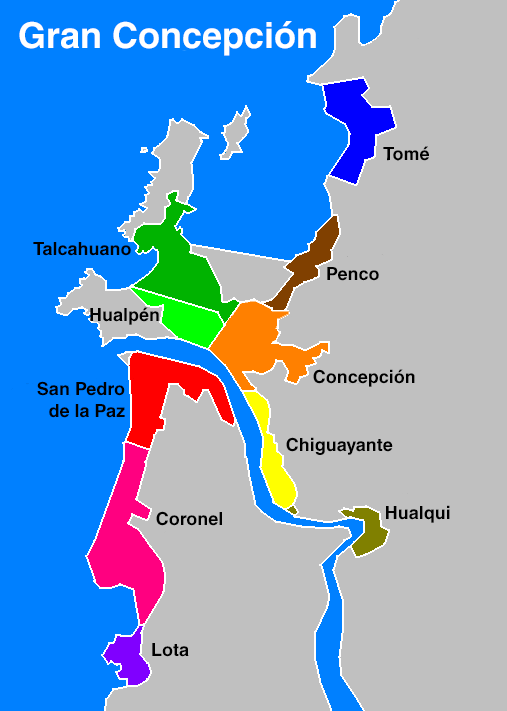
- Gran Concepción (Metropolis of Concepción)
- Coordinates: 36°47′0″S 73°07′0″W
- Region: Biobío
- Province: Concepción Province
- Foundation: October 5, 1550
- Elevation: 4 m (13 ft)

Population (2017)^{2}
  - Metro: 1,100,000
- Time zone: UTC-4 (Chile Time (CLT))
  - Summer (DST): UTC-3 (Chile Summer Time (CLST))
- Website: concepcion.cl

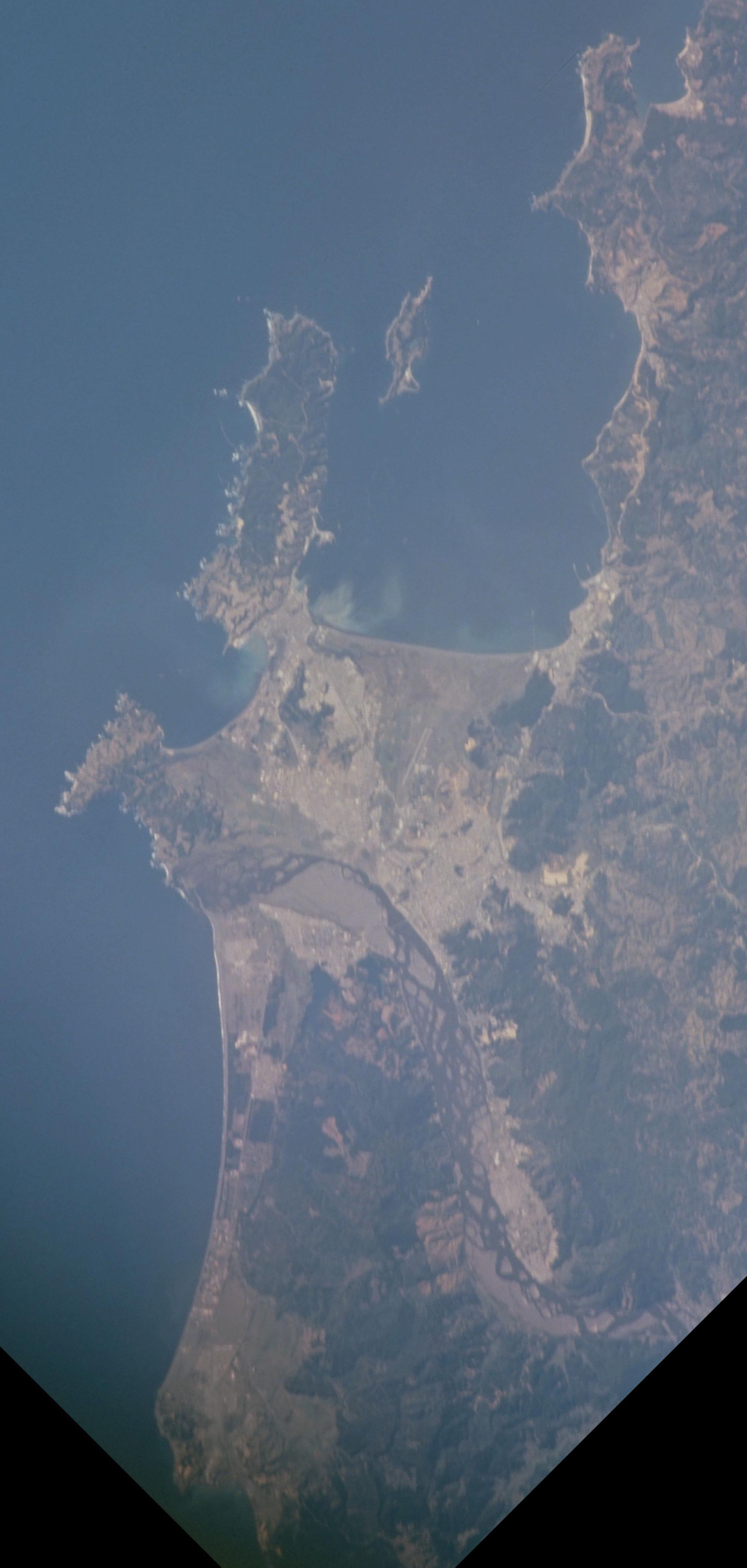
Satellite image of Greater Concepción

Gran Concepción is the second largest conurbation in Chile, after Greater Santiago and closely followed by Greater Valparaíso. The area has 1,100,000 inhabitants according to the 2012 pre census.

== Overview ==
It takes its name after the city of Concepción, the regional capital and main city.

The agglomeration is composed of:

- Concepción
- Talcahuano
- Chiguayante
- San Pedro de la Paz
- Hualpén
- Penco
- Tomé
- Coronel
- Lota
- Hualqui

Gran Concepción has also the second largest concentration of universities in Chile. Apart from the so-called Traditional Universities, it has several private institutions. The Universidad de Concepción is the most important university in the conurbation.

There is also a commuter rail system which serves most of the communes (Spanish: comunas) in the conurbation: Biotren.

== Commerce ==
The commerce in Greater Concepcion is mostly located in Concepcion city center, also in the Mall Plaza el Trebol, in Talcahuano.

== Education ==
=== Universities ===
- Universidad de Concepción (Concepción)
- Universidad del Bío-Bío (Concepción)
- Universidad Católica de la Santísima Concepción (Concepción)
- Universidad Técnica Federico Santa María (Hualpén)
- Universidad de Los Lagos (Concepción)
- Universidad del Desarrollo (Concepción)
- Universidad San Sebastián (Concepción)
- Universidad Andrés Bello (Talcahuano)
- Universidad Santo Tomás (Concepción)
- Universidad Tecnológica de Chile (Talcahuano)
- Universidad de las Américas (Concepción)
- Universidad La República (Concepción)
- Universidad ARCIS (Concepción)
- Universidad Bolivariana (Concepción)
- Universidad de Pedro de Valdivia (Concepción)
- Universidad del Pacífico (Concepción)

=== Institutes ===
- Instituto Profesional INACAP (Talcahuano)
- Instituto Profesional DuocUC (Concepción)
- Instituto Profesional Santo Tomás (Concepción)
- Instituto Profesional AIEP (Concepción)
- Instituto Profesional Providencia (Concepción)
- Instituto de Estudios Bancarios Guillermo Subercaseaux (Concepción)
- Instituto Profesional Virginio Gómez (Concepción)
- Instituto Profesional Diego Portales (Concepción)
- Instituto Tecnológico UCSC (Talcahuano)
- Instituto Profesional La Araucana (Concepción)
- Instituto Profesional Valle Central (Concepción)
