= Christian Social Party (Chile) =

Defunct political party in Chile (2022–2026)

Christian Social Party Partido Social Cristiano
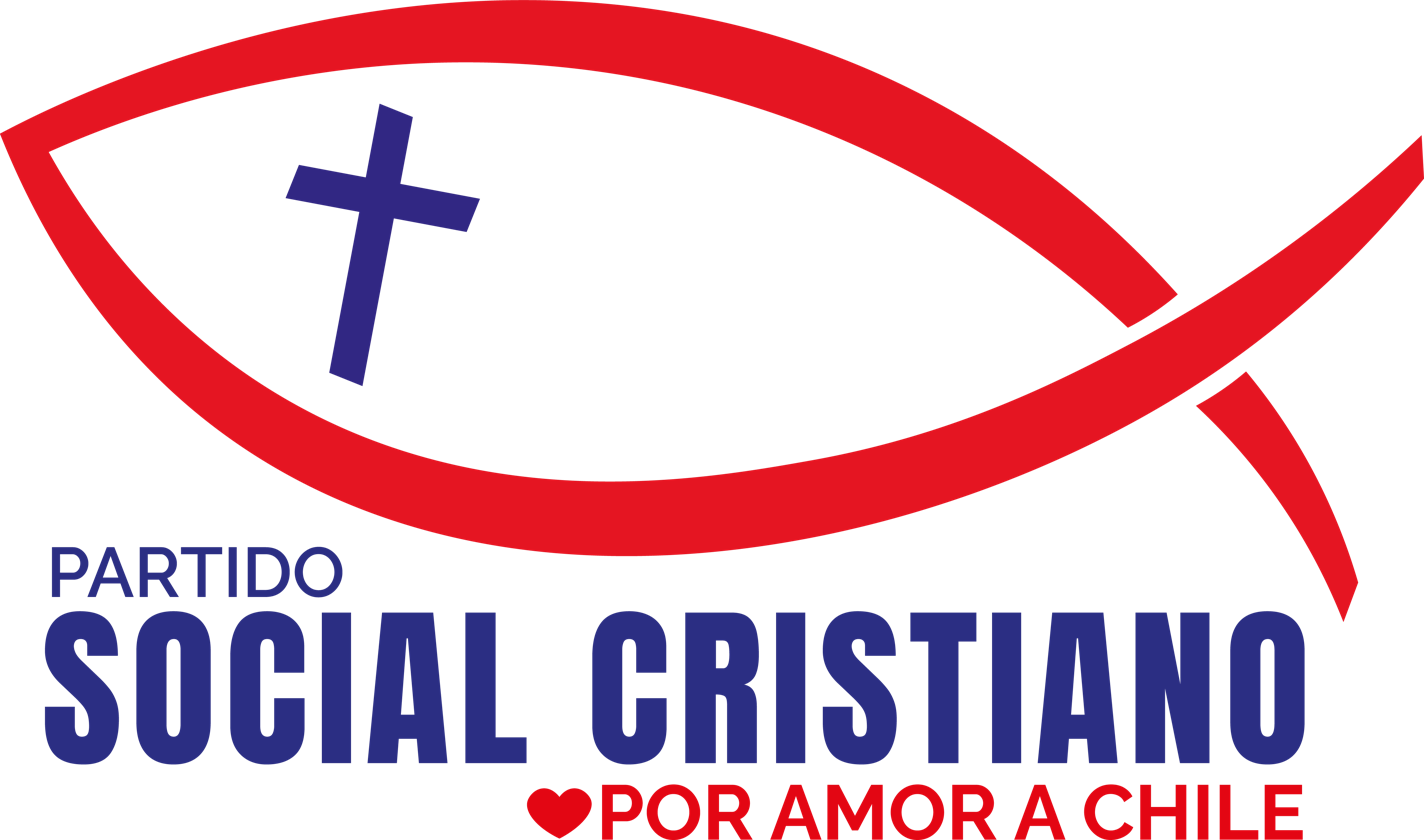
- Abbreviation: PSC
- President: Sara Concha
- Secretary-General: Judith Marin
- Founded: 23 September 2022
- Dissolved: 5 February 2026
- Preceded by: Christian Conservative
- Headquarters: 488 Atenas, Chillán, Ñuble
- Membership (June 2024): ▲17,908
- Ideology: Christian right; Anti-communism; Antifeminism; Anti-LGBT; Anti-abortion; Right-wing antiglobalism; Social conservatism; Christian Zionism
- Political position: Far-right
- Religion: Evangelicalism
- National affiliation: Change for Chile
- Colours: Blue; Red
- Slogan: “For the love of Chile” (Spanish: «Por amor a Chile»)
- Chamber of Deputies: 3 / 155
- Senate: 2 / 50
- Regional governorships: 0 / 16
- Alcaldes: 1 / 345
- Regional Councils: 6 / 302
- Communal Councils: 24 / 2,252

Party flag

Website
- socialcristiano.cl

The Christian Social Party (Spanish: Partido Social Cristiano; PSC) was a Chilean political party founded in September 2022 and dissolved in February 2026. It was formed by independent leaders and ex-militants of the defunct Christian Conservative Party (PCC).

== History ==
The community arose after the dissolution of the PCC, a group that during the 2021 parliamentary elections achieved the election of Sara Concha as deputy for the Ñuble Region under the Christian Social Front pact. Among its founders were Luciano Silva, a former National Renewal (RN) conventioneer, and Antaris Varela, who presided over the PCC. Ángel Roa served as party leader from September 2022 to May 2023.

Like its predecessor, the PSC is linked to evangelical and conservative church groups.

In November 2022, the community began its formation and constitution process before the Electoral Service (Servel). During that same month, the incorporation of Deputy Concha was confirmed, who until then was independent and a member of the RN bench in the Chamber of Deputies.

It was dissolved on 5 February 2026 for failing to obtain the minimum number of votes required in the 2025 parliamentary elections to continue as a party.

== Leadership ==
The Christian Social Party presented a provisional directive for its formation process as a political party, which is made up of:

- President: Sara Concha.
- Secretary: Antaris Varela.
- Vice President: Héctor Muñoz.
- Advisor: Juan Carlos Venegas.
- Public relations officer: Luciano Silva.
- Treasurer: Belén Núñez.

In the same way, it presented a Supreme Court made up of a president, a vice president, a secretary and three members.

== Party authorities ==
=== Deputies ===
The deputies, including militants and independents within the party caucus, for the 2022-2026 legislative period are:

Name	Region	District
Sara Concha (PCC-elected)	Ñuble	19
Francesca Muñoz (RN-elected)	Biobío	20
Roberto Enrique Arroyo (PDG-elected)	Biobío	20
Enrique Lee Flores (PRI-elected)	Arica y Parinacota	1
Yovana Ahumada (PDG-elected)	Antofagasta	3

=== Senators ===
The senators, including militants and independents within the party caucus, for the 2022-2026 legislative period are:

Name	Region	District
Juan Castro Prieto (RN-elected)	Maule	9
Alejandro Kusanovic (RN-elected)	Magallanes	15

=== Regional Councilors ===
The Regional Councilors affiliated with the party include:

Name	Region	Province
Carolina Moscoso	Antofagasta	Antofagasta
Paula Muñoz	O'Higgins	Cachapoal I
Ivania Rojas	Biobío	Biobío
Yanina Contreras	Biobío	Concepción II
Jacqueline Burgos	Biobío	Concepción II
Tatiana Castillo	Coquimbo	Elqui
Matías Guzmán	Coquimbo	Limarí
Solange Jimenez	Tarapacá	Iquique

=== Communal Councils ===
The Communal Councilors affiliated with the party include:

Name	Region	Commune
Elena Retamal	Ñuble	Talcahuano
Rosemarie Aránguiz	Biobío	Hualpén
Daniel Pacheco	Biobío	Concepción
Mauricio Rodríguez	Biobío	Cabrero
Judith Marin	Metropolitana	San Ramón
Sandra Challapa	Tarapacá	Camiña
Marcelo Barrientos	Los Lagos	Fresia
Brayan Pizarro	Antofagasta	Tocopilla
Samuel Mendoza	Biobío	Penco

== Election results ==
=== Congress elections ===
Election year	Chamber of Deputies			Senate			Status
Election year	# Votes	% Votes	Seats	# Votes	% Votes	Seats	Status
2025	362,888	3.39%	3 / 155	80,426	2.60%	2 / 50	Government
