= Francesca Muñoz =

Chilean politician and deputy

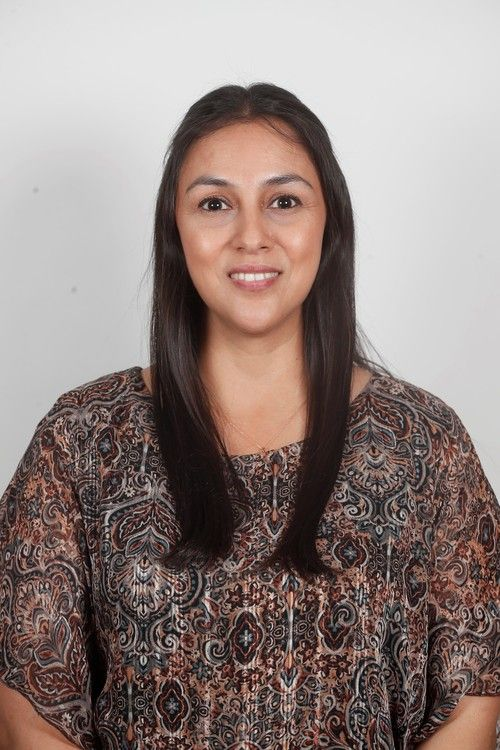
- Official portrait, 2022

Member of the Chamber of Deputies
- Incumbent
- Assumed office 11 March 2018
- Constituency: District 20

Personal details
- Born: Francesca Elizabeth Andrea Muñoz González; 7 March 1980 (age 46) Concepción, Chile
- Party: Christian Social Party (2023–present)
- Other political affiliations: National Renewal (until 2022)
- Education: University of Concepción
- Occupation: Professor

Francesca Elizabeth Andrea Muñoz González (born March 7, 1980) is a Chilean politician, English teacher, and member of the Christian Social Party (PSC). She currently serves as a deputy for District 20.

== Biography ==
She was born in Concepción to Juan Ricardo Muñoz Roa and Magdalena del Carmen González Manríquez.

She attended elementary and high school at the Liceo Comercial Enrique Oyarzún Mondaca, in Concepción, and completed her higher education at the Universidad de Concepción, where she graduated as an English teacher.

She is married to Héctor Muñoz Uribe, councilor for the commune of Concepción (with whom she has two children; Francesca and Juan), and together with him, she created the university movement Movimiento Águilas de Jesús at the University of Concepción. She has been against the abortion, gender identity and equal marriage projects promoted by Michelle Bachelet's government.

== Professional career ==
Until the end of 2017, she worked as an English teacher at the Enrique Soro School, in San Pedro de la Paz.

== Political career ==
She began her political career as a member of Renovación Nacional. In the 2013 parliamentary elections, she ran as a candidate for deputy for District No. 44 of the Biobío Region, obtaining 15,184 votes equivalent to 8.77% of the votes, but was not elected.

Then, in the 2016 municipal elections, she ran as mayor of the commune of Chiguayante, but was not elected after obtaining 1,834 votes, equivalent to 7.93% of the votes.

In the 2017 parliamentary elections, she was elected deputy supported by the Renovación Nacional party, representing District 20 for the period 2018–2022. She obtained 23,140 votes, equivalent to 6.9% of the votes validly cast.

On March 14, 2018, she became a member of the Permanent Commissions on Foreign Relations, Interparliamentary Affairs and Latin American Integration; and Family and Senior Citizens. Likewise, on July 3 of the same year, she joined the Special Investigative Commission of government programs classified as having insufficient performance, according to the list attached to the request, and the administrative and budgetary reasons that would explain their result (CEI 8). She was part of the RN Parliamentary Committee.

She was re-elected in the 2021 elections as the first majority in her district, assuming her second parliamentary term in March 2022. In November of that year, she announced her resignation from RN. In January 2023 she joined the Christian Social Committee and Independents and in May of that same year, she officially joined the Christian Social Party (PSC) along with a group of Biobío authorities.
