= Quiriquina Island =

Island in Bío Bío Region, Chile

Native name: Isla Quiriquina
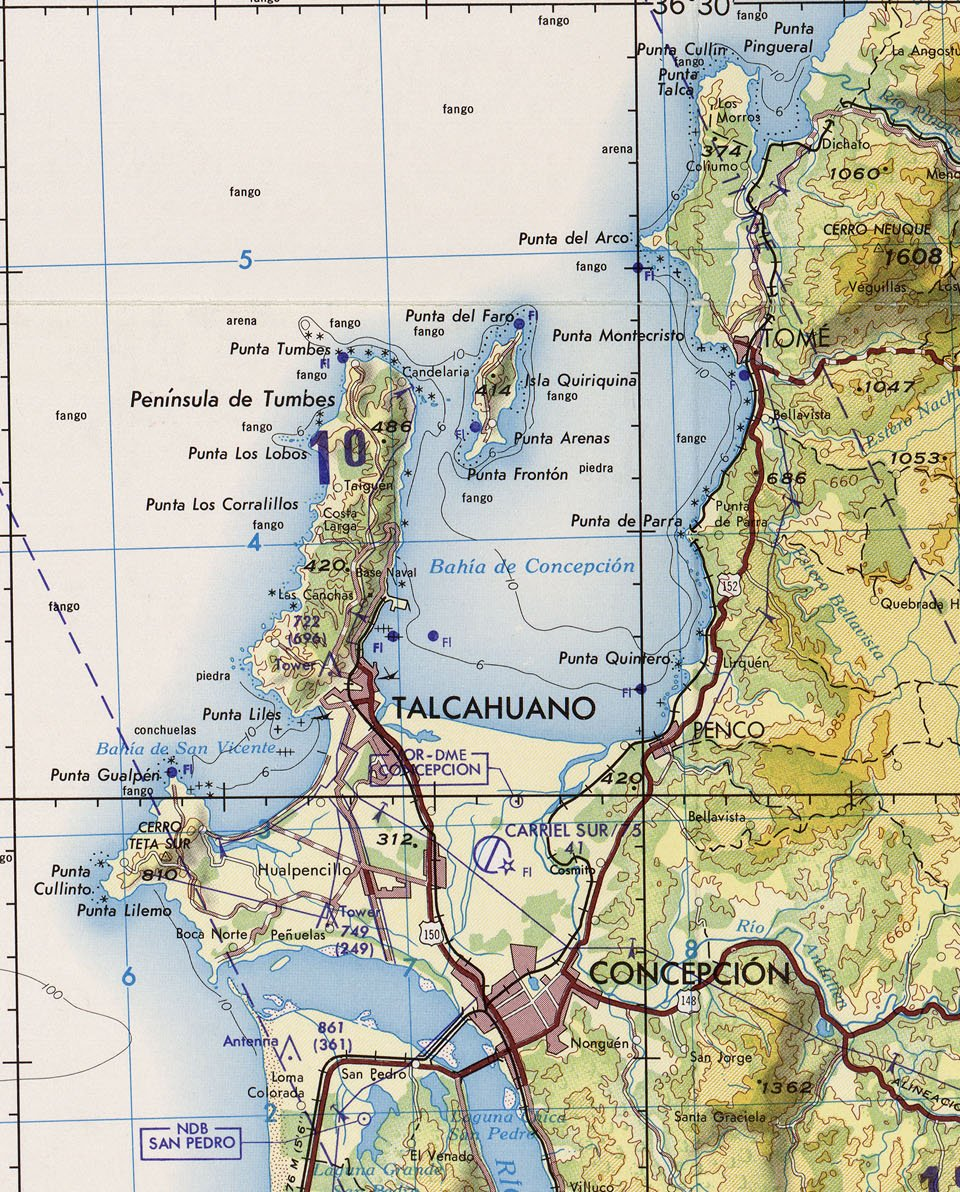

Geography
- Coordinates: 36.625768°S 73.060805°W
- Adjacent to: Pacific Ocean
- Total islands: 1
- Area: 4.86 km^{2} (1.88 sq mi)
- Length: 5.3 km (3.29 mi)
- Width: 1.6 km (0.99 mi)
- Highest point: 120

Administration
- Chile
- Region: Bío Bío
- Province: Concepción
- Commune: Talcahuano

Additional information
- NGA UFI -898520

Quiriquina Island, Chile is located at the entrance to the Bay of Concepción, 11 km north of Talcahuano. (Quiriquina is a Mapuche word meaning "many True thrushes").

In April, 1557, Don Garcia de Mendoza, Spanish governor of the Captaincy General of Chile, arrived at Concepción with a large force of infantry and established himself upon Quiriquina. He then used it as a base for his campaign against the Mapuche in the continuing Arauco War.

In 1835, shortly after earthquake in the nearby city of Concepción, Charles Darwin, voyaging around the world on board HMS Beagle, visited the island.

During the First World War the Chilean government used Quiriquina to intern the crew of the German cruiser SMS Dresden. Then-lieutenant Wilhelm Canaris, who escaped with two other crew members, was among the internees.

After the 1973 Chilean coup d'état, the Pinochet regime used the island as a concentration camp for political prisoners from Concepción and the Bío Bío Region. This camp was active from 11 September 1973 to April 1975.

On the northwest of the island there is a lighthouse. To the southeast there is Fort Rondizzoni, which consisted of dormitories, mess facilities, latrines, and an infirmary, all for the guards.

== See also ==
- Quiriquina Formation

== Sources ==
- Francisco Solano Asta-Buruaga y Cienfuegos, Diccionario geográfico de la República de Chile, Segunda edición corregida y aumentada, Nueva York, D. Appleton y Compañía. 1899.] page 632
- Sclerorhynchid teeth from the Late Cretaceous of the Quiriquina Formation
