= Dichato =

- Town
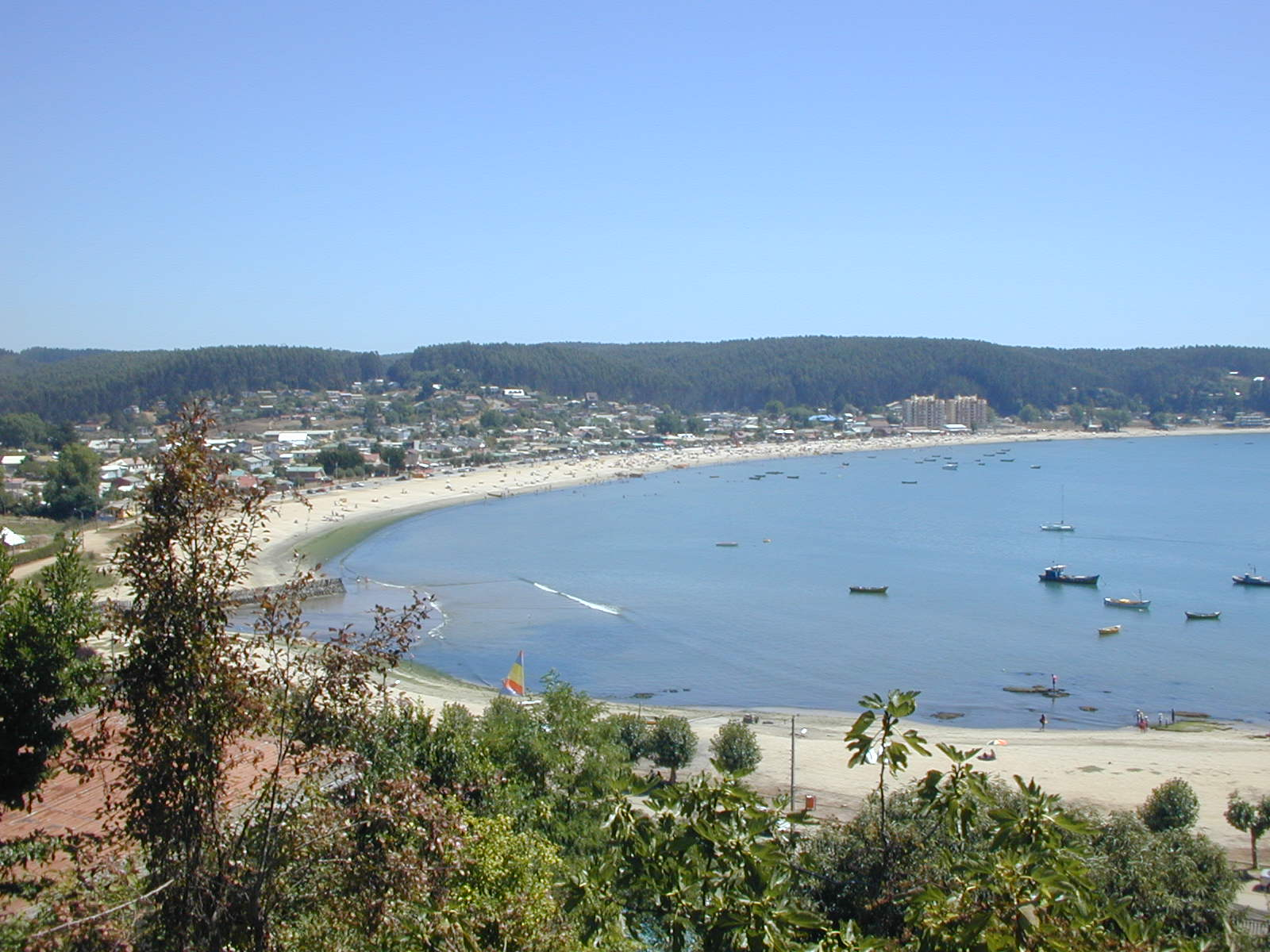
- Dichato Bay in 2007

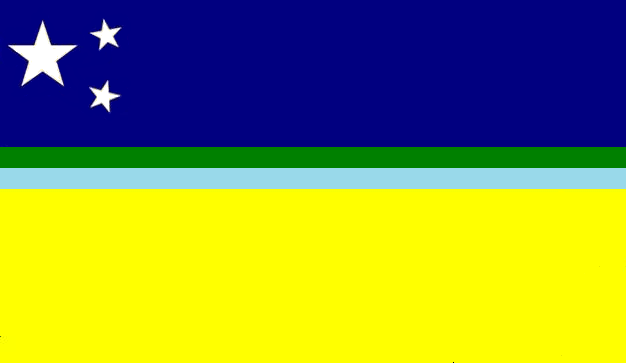
- Flag

- Location within Chile
- Coordinates: 36°32′55″S 72°56′10″W
- Country: Chile
- Region: Biobío
- Province: Concepción
- Commune: Tomé

Area
  - Total: 3.95 km^{2} (1.53 sq mi)

Population (2017)
  - Total: 4,486
  - Density: 1,140/km^{2} (2,940/sq mi)

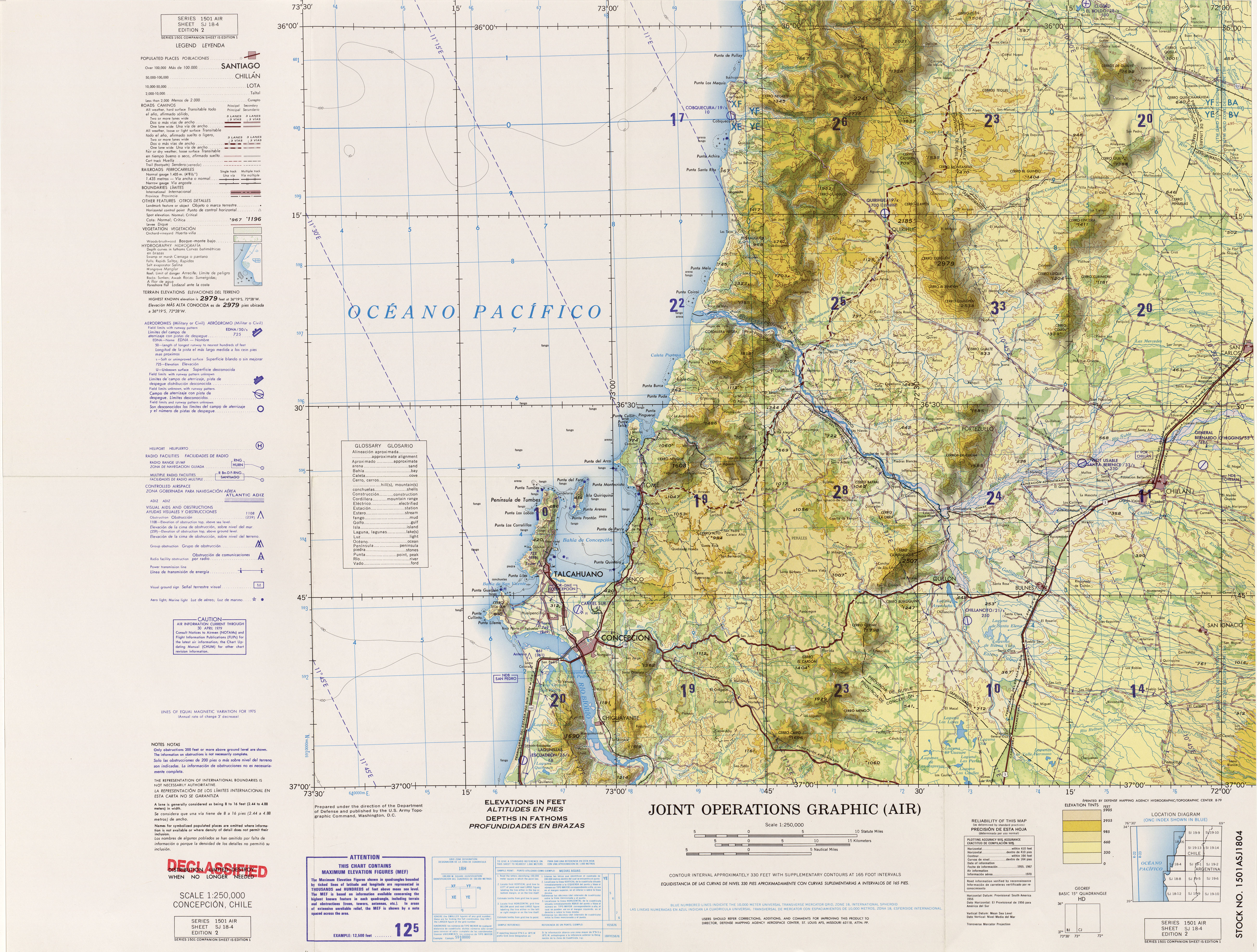
Dichato, north of Tomé

Dichato is a coastal town located in the commune of Tomé in the Biobío Region, in central Chile. The town is located 37 kilometers north of the city of Concepción and has 4,486 inhabitants according to the 2017 census.

Its geography is a very closed bay, with calm but very cold waters, suitable for water sports, frequently visited in the summer. It has numerous restaurants specializing in seafood products and diverse hotel offerings, operating all year round, but mainly occupied in the summer season. During the rest of the year, its main productive activity is artisanal fishing, with picturesque boats.

The earthquake and tsunami of February 27, 2010 greatly affected Dichato, mainly its flat sector, where the force of the sea destroyed everything in its path.

== Etymology ==
The word Dichato has Mapuche origin (<düchantu) meaning "dichal," "abundance of dichas" (a spiny herb). Another theory is that it derives from dücha, "dicha" and ko = water or from dëchatun, "to uproot dichas." The dichas (from the Mapudungun word dichon, to stab) are the names of various herbs from the nictiginaceae family, which encompasses around 350 species spread across 38 genera (they are characterized by having smooth-edged leaves opposite the stems and flowers without petals).

== History ==
Dichato was founded in 1826 by José Miguel Reyes. In 1835, the naturalist Charles Darwin visited the town while sailing on the Beagle and examined the coal deposits in the area. In 1856, Juan Mackay began exploiting the coal mines in the area, but the exploitation did not prosper. Between 1912 and 1920, the land was leased by Vicente Alberto Palacios, and later Lautaro Rozas founded the "Sociedad Carbonífera Dichato Limitada." The town's coal mining activity declined after the 1939 earthquake, with the rise of the mines in Coronel and Lota.

Daniel Vera, a mill owner, was one of the important landowners in Dichato at the end of the 19th century. He divided his land among his children, including Casimiro Vera Celedón, who wrote the first known poems in the area and a text called "La pastora del Pingueral." The main street in the town is named after Daniel Vera and houses the town's civic square.

Between 1916 and the beginning of the 1990s, Dichato had railway services from Rucapequén-Concepción. This transportation brought many summer visitors from Chillán. The regular passenger service was discontinued in the 1980s, with only sporadic special services continuing for a few years.

In 2005, the sewer system was built, and in 2007, a sewage treatment plant was built to prevent pollution in the bay.

=== 2010 and 2011 earthquakes ===
The earthquake of February 2010 left 80% of the town destroyed, affecting fishing, gastronomic, and hotel services. The tsunami flooded 80 hectares, bringing boats in its wake, and reaching heights of up to four meters. A year later, the tsunami caused by the Tōhoku earthquake dragged boats and affected some homes.

=== Reconstruction ===
The reconstruction of Dichato took place between 2011 and 2013 as part of the Coastal Border Reconstruction Plan, initiated by the Ministry of Housing and Urbanization, which included 18 towns affected by the 2010 earthquake. The works included the expropriation of sites located on the first beach line to widen the street and create a "tsunami mitigation park." A 800-meter long coastal defense wall and a pedestrian walkway were built. Approximately 600 homes were reconstructed, some in higher and more inland areas, and others as stilt houses. The main avenue was remodeled and the "Daniel Vera" boulevard was built.

== Economy ==
The primary source of income for the residents of Dichato is fishing. These are artisanal fishing activities for fish and seafood, which are sold locally. Marine concessions, called "management areas," have also been granted, where oysters, locos (Concholepas concholepas), and mussels are grown.

Tourism has been important since the 1980s, through recreational services, typical food restaurants, and accommodations in small hotels, residential homes, and private cabins.

Tourism development in this town has occurred in the past two decades with the opening of restaurants, bars, and nightclubs, as well as real estate projects for apartment buildings. However, the largest project is the private Pingueral complex.

=== Pingueral ===
The Pingueral residential complex is located in front of the beach of the same name, next to the north side of Dichato, in the municipality of Tomé. For years, access was restricted only to the owners of the houses in the development, but this changed in 2009 when the authorities ordered compliance with the prevailing laws that guarantee free access to the beaches.

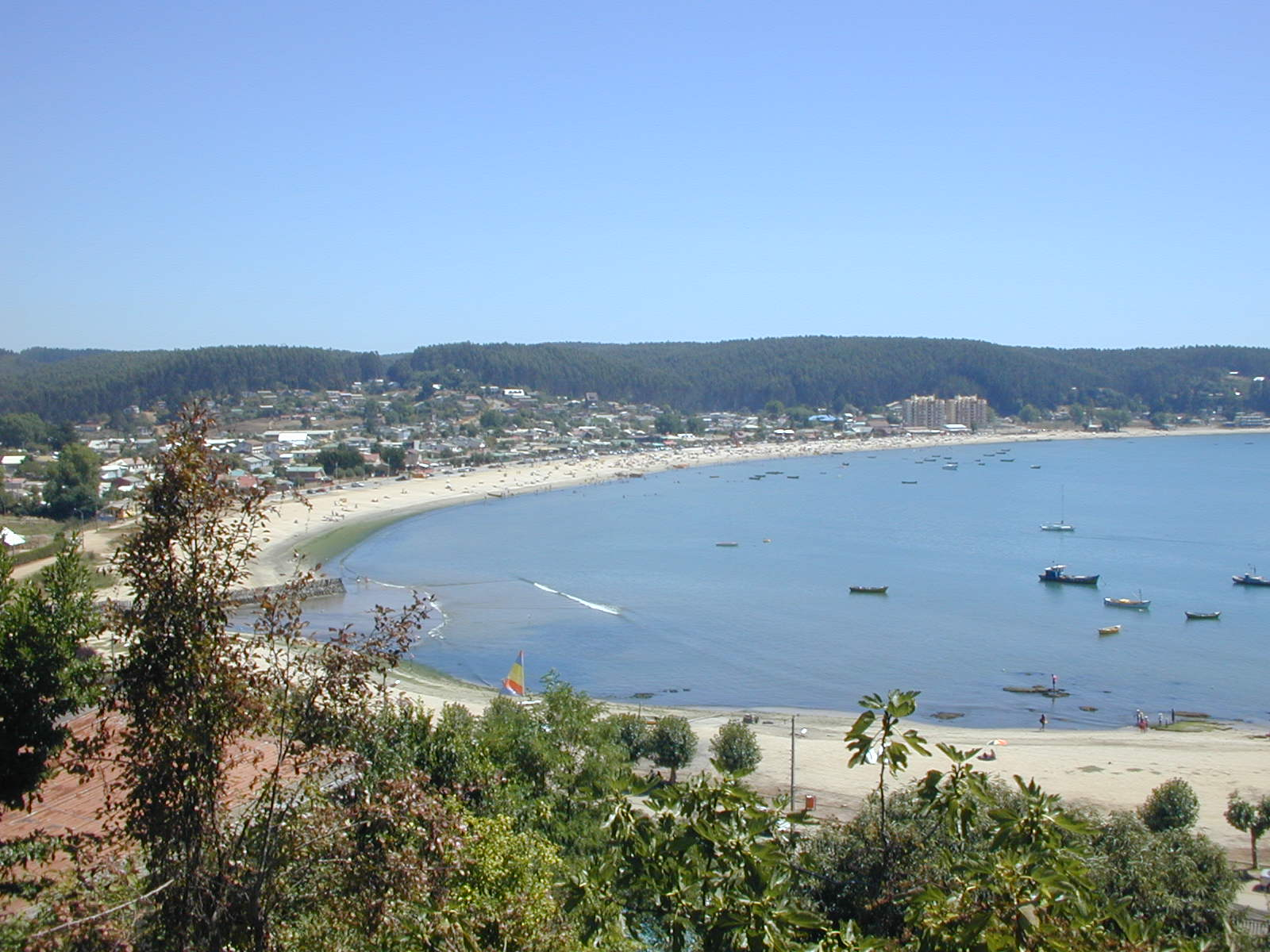
Dichato Bay

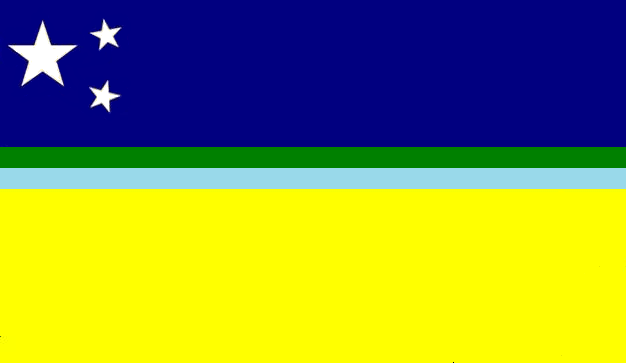
Dichato Flag

Dichato in 2006

== Scientific research ==
The Marine Biology Station of Dichato is located in the locality, which is dependent on the University of Concepción and was inaugurated on November 20, 1978. It houses scientific research facilities and a scientific boat, "Kay-Kay."

== Transport ==
Dichato can be accessed through a single paved route (Route CH-150) that connects Concepción and Tomé. Another access route is from the north via a gravel road in regular condition from Coelemu and Boca del Itata. Dichato has a high-frequency bus service to Tomé and Concepción during the summer, as well as collective taxis that reach Tomé. In winter, however, services operate with much lower frequency.

== See also ==
- List of towns in Chile
