= Marlene Pérez =

Marlene Pérez may refer to:

- Marlene Pérez (politician)
- Marlene Perez (writer)
