= Bay of Concepción =

Bay in Bío Bío Region, Chile

Coordinates: 36°41′S 73°02′W

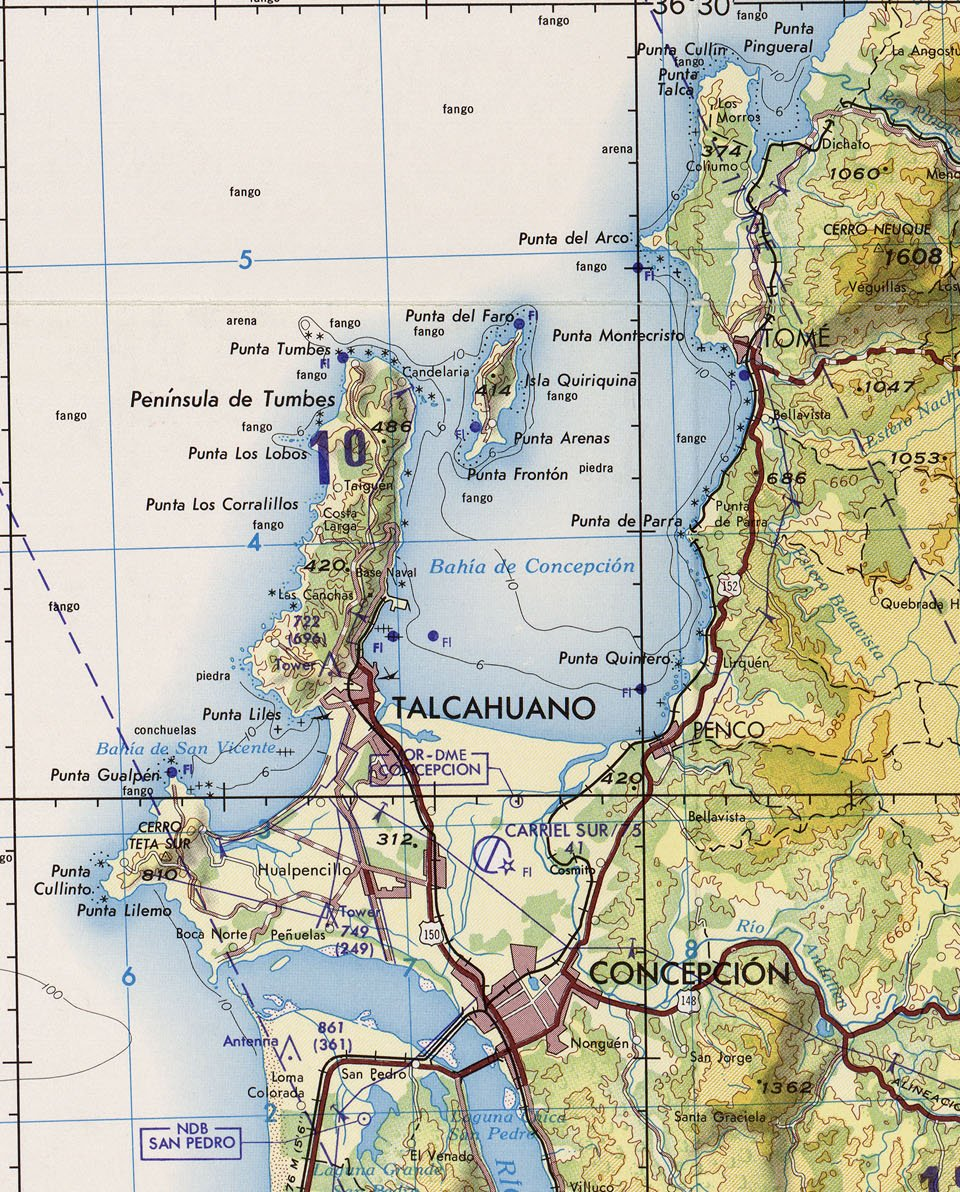
Region of BioBio

The Bay of Concepción is a natural bay on the coast of the Province of Concepción in the Bío Bío Region of Chile. Within the bay are many of the most important ports of the region and the country, among them Penco, Talcahuano, and Lirquén.

Quiriquina Island, located to the north in the mouth of the bay provides a windbreak. The island creates two entrances to the bay: Boca Chica and Boca Grande. Boca Chica, between Quriquina Island and the Peninsula of Tumbes, measures 2 km wide and in its narrower part 1,500 metres, with shoals to the sides and although water depth is 15 metres, the passage of large ships is reduced to 400 metres. Boca Grande, is 5 km wide, with depths of 35 metres, which makes it commodious for large vessels.

The sector of the bay where the Port of Talcahuano is located is known as the Bay of Talcahuano, and is protected by the Peninsula of Tumbes and Quiriquina Island.
