= Alejandro Kusanovic =

Chilean politician

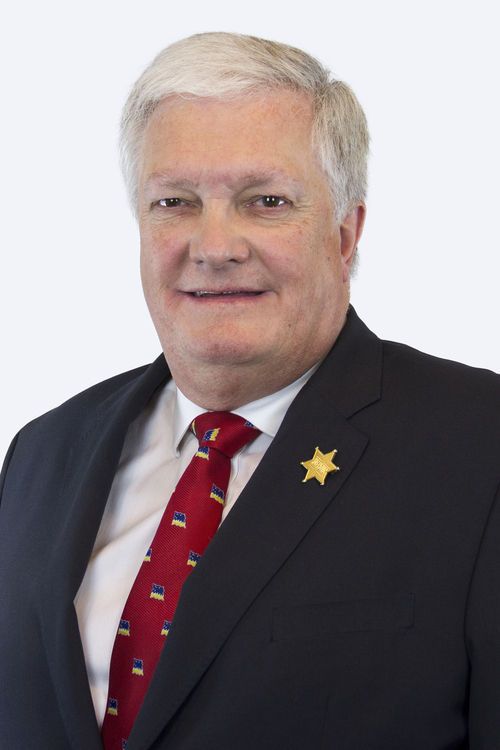

Member of the Senate of Chile
- In office 11 March 2022 – 11 March 2030
- Preceded by: Carolina Goic
- Constituency: 15th Circumscription

Regional Counselor of Magallanes Region
- In office 2013–2021

Personal details
- Born: 16 October 1960 (age 65) Punta Arenas, Chile
- Party: Independent (pro-PSC)
- Parent(s): Javier Kusanovic; Rosa Glusevic
- Occupation: Politician

Alejandro Juan Kusanovic Glusevic (born 16 December 1960) is a Chilean mechanical civil engineer and independent politician. He has served as Senator for the 15th Circumscription of the Magallanes Region since 2022.

Previously, he served as Regional Councillor of Magallanes for two consecutive terms between 2013 and 2021 and as president of the Regional Council from September 2019 to November 2020.

== Biography ==
Kusanovic was born on 16 December 1960 in Punta Arenas, Magallanes Region. He is the son of Javier Américo Domingo Kusanovic Mihovilovic and Rosa Catalina Glusevic Dragnic.

He completed his secondary education at Liceo San José of Punta Arenas in 1977.

He worked for more than thirty years at Transbordadora Austral Broom (Tabsa), where he served as general manager until mid-2021.

== Political career ==
Kusanovic became involved in public affairs through business associations and later as a member of the Regional Council of Magallanes, serving two consecutive terms from 2013 to 2017 and from 2017 to 2021. In the 2017 regional elections, he obtained the highest number of votes among candidates, with 3,591 votes.

Between September 2019 and November 2020, he served as president of the Regional Council of Magallanes.

Until August 2021, he was regional president (Magallanes) of the Confederation of Production and Commerce (CPC).

In 2015, he was a member of the Advisory Committee of the Vice-Rectorate for Outreach and Community Engagement of the University of Magallanes.

In the parliamentary elections held on 21 November 2021, he was elected Senator for the 15th Circumscription of the Magallanes Region as an independent candidate supported by the National Renewal party, within the Chile Podemos Más coalition. He obtained 9,287 votes, corresponding to 14.28% of the valid votes cast.
