= Erasmo Moena =

Chilean murderer and suspected serial killer (b. 1970)

- Mugshot of Erasmo Moena, taken by the Chilean Gendarmerie.
- Born: Erasmo Antonio Moena Pinto; January 10, 1970 (age 56); Tomé, Chile
- Other name: "The Psychopath of Placilla"
- Convictions: Murder x2 Rape x3
- Penalty: 61 years and 176 days imprisonment

Details
- Victims: 2–3+ (murder); 6 (rape)
- Span of crimes: 1991–2010
- Country: Chile
- States: Ñuble, Valparaíso
- Date apprehended: For the final time on April 9, 2010

Erasmo Antonio Moena Pinto (born January 10, 1970), known as The Psychopath of Placilla (Spanish: El psicópata de Placilla), is a Chilean murderer and suspected serial killer. Convicted and sentenced to 60 years imprisonment for a double murder committed in 2010, he remains a suspect in at least one additional murder in which he has been acquitted.

== Early life ==
Erasmo Antonio Moena Pinto was born on January 10, 1970, in Tomé. According to his mother, María Elizabeth Pinto Villegas, he suffered no physical or mental abuse while growing up, but was a poor student who was treated as an outcast by his peers due to his macho and hypersexual attitude.

Moena enrolled in the Margarita Naseau School in Tomé and later the San Pedro Nolasco School in Concepción, which he attended from 1983 to 1984. During the second semester of 1984, he was found guilty of several robberies and was summarily expelled. The most notable part of his school life that at one point Moena had to be hospitalized for a week for cranial injuries, as he had thrown himself off a moving bus and hit his head against the pavement as part of a game played by him and his friends. Reportedly, in his first and fourth year, he was classmates with future journalist and television presenter Julio César Rodríguez.

After school, Moena enrolled at the Universidad Técnica Federico Santa María in Concepción, where he studied mechanical engineering, but lasted only one semester. Following this, he dedicated himself to trafficking porno films.

== Crimes and first murder ==
In 1990, the 20-year-old committed his first serious crime after robbing the "Provisiones Joaquín" warehouse in Múlchen. He was ordered to serve 541 days in jail, but since it was his first offense, the punishment was remitted.

Moena then moved to Coelemu, where he quickly became friends with 27-year-old hairdresser Marco Antonio Cortés, who soon moved in with him. A close friend of Cortés claimed that the two men were in an intimate relationship, but Moena has denied those claims. On August 27, 1991, Moena murdered Cortés and, together with a group of friends, dismembered his body, set it on fire with gasoline and then threw the remains into the Itata River. He later admitted to the crime to a partner he had in Quirihue, who then turned him in to the police. Although Moena admitted to murdering Cortés, his remains were never found and he was thus acquitted of all charges, since a murder conviction in Chile is not valid without the body of the deceased. The motive for the murder remains unknown.

=== Rapes and double murder ===
In 2007, he raped a woman in Múlchen, for which he was sentenced to three years and one day imprisonment. Moena was released on March 14, 2010, but only four days later, he sexually assaulted a 10-year-old minor at a bus terminal in Los Ángeles. Six days later, he raped another woman and on March 25, he committed his final rape on a homeless woman living on the outskirts of the city. He was identified as the perpetrator of these crimes, and local authorities issued a warrant for his arrest on April 1.

On April 6, Moena posted a listing for a supposed job offer in the newspaper and received a reply from 36-year-old Loreto López Fernández, the daughter of retired gendarmes. Approximately six hours after killing her, Moena was contacted by a friend of López, 43-year-old Andrea Susana Quappe Pinto, who demanded to know where she was. Moena lured her to a forest outside Viña del Mar, where he then smashed her head in with a rock.

== Investigation, arrest, and confessions ==
After some time had passed, a cousin of López named Nelly Andrea San Martín Fernández contacted Moena under the pretense of being interested in his "job offer". PDI investigators traced the phone call to Moena's identity card, and with San Martín's help, they organized a stake-out at a coffee shop near the bus terminal in Valparaíso, where the pair had agreed to meet up. When Moena arrived, he was swiftly detained and brought back to the police station. With no other option, he admitted to his crimes and indicated where they could find the bodies. On April 9, the two women's decomposing remains were finally recovered.

Following Moena's arrest, investigators examined his belongings and found eight pairs of panties and a bra, presumed to be trophies collected from his victims. In addition to this, they located a revolver and five cars, two of which were identified as belonging to López and Quappe, but the owners of the remaining three went unidentified. Due to this, some suspect that they might belong to additional, yet undiscovered, victims.

== Trial and imprisonment ==
While his trial was underway, Justice Isabel Uribe ordered that Moena remain in solitary confinement and under constant surveillance while the investigation took place. The investigation itself was headed by Rodrigo Hinzpeter, the contemporary Minister of the Interior and Public Security.

Moena ultimately sentenced to 61 years and 176 days imprisonment; 60 years for the double murder and 541 days for illegal firearms ownership. In addition, he is ineligible for any sort of prison benefits or release, meaning that he must serve his sentence in full and can be released at the earliest in 2071.

Ever since his incarceration, Moena has refused to repent for his actions. According to Dr. Ítalo Sigala Romele, a forensic psychiatrist at the Forensic Medical Service of Santiago, he was diagnosed as a narcissistic, sadistic and antisocial psychopath with very high intelligence and persuasion skills, which he used to lure in his victims.
