= Hualqui =

- City and Commune
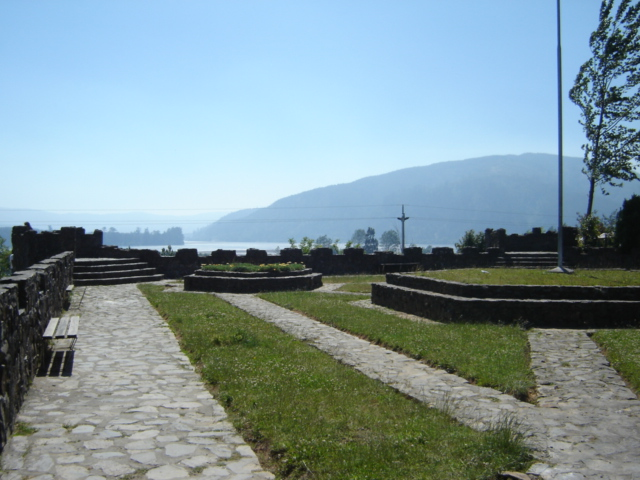
- Mirador of Hualqui, formerly the colonial fortress

- Flag Coat of arms Location of Hualqui commune in the Bío Bío Region Location in Chile
- Coordinates (city): 36°57′36″S 72°55′48″W
- Country: Chile
- Region: Bío Bío
- Province: Concepción

Government
  - Type: Municipality
  - Alcalde: Ricardo Fuentes Palma (Ind.)

Area
  - Total: 530.5 km^{2} (204.8 sq mi)
- Elevation: 39 m (128 ft)

Population (2017 Census)
  - Total: 24,333
  - Density: 45.87/km^{2} (118.8/sq mi)
  - Urban: 20,889
  - Rural: 3,444

Sex
  - Men: 11,843
  - Women: 12,490
- Time zone: UTC−4 (CLT)
  - Summer (DST): UTC−3 (CLST)
- Area code: 56 + 41
- Website: Municipality of Hualqui

Hualqui (Spanish pronunciation: [ˈ(g)walki]) is a Chilean city and commune in the Concepción Province, Biobio Region. It is also part of the Greater Concepcion conurbation, although it maintains a rural profile. It had a population of 24,333 inhabitants according to the 2017 census.

Its name comes from the Moluche Aillarehue and rehue of Hualqui that existed there at the beginning of the Conquest of Chile. In 1577, the Royal Governor of Chile Rodrigo de Quiroga erected a small fort of Hualqui on the Biobío River 23 km (14 mi) from the city of Concepcion and 24 km (15 mi) to the northwest of Talcamávida at the site of the modern city and over time a small settlement grew around it. In the beginning of 1756 Governor Manuel de Amat y Juniet erected a town there, named San Juan Bautista de Gualqui. It served as capital to the Corregimiento de Puchacay and then Partido de Puchacay until 1799.

== Demographics ==
According to the 2017 census of the National Statistics Institute, Hualqui spans an area of 530.5 km^{2} (205 sq mi) and has 24,333 inhabitants (11,843 men and 12,490 women). Of these, 20,889 (85.8%) lived in urban areas and 3,444 (14.2%) in rural areas. The population grew by 16.2% (2,612 persons) between the 1992 and 2002 censuses.

== Administration ==
As a commune, Hualqui is a third-level administrative division of Chile administered by a municipal council, headed by an alcalde who is directly elected every four years. The 2008-2012 alcalde is Ricardo Fuentes Palma (Ind.).

Within the electoral divisions of Chile, Hualqui is represented in the Chamber of Deputies by Sergio Bobadilla (UDI) and Clemira Pacheco (PS) as part of the 45th electoral district, (together with Tomé, Penco, Florida, Coronel and Santa Juana). The commune is represented in the Senate by Alejandro Navarro Brain (MAS) and Hosain Sabag Castillo (PDC) as part of the 12th senatorial constituency (Biobío-Cordillera).

== See also ==
- Hualqui Station
- Greater Concepcion
