= Santa Juana =

- City and Commune
- Flag Coat of arms Location of Santa Juana commune in the Bío Bío Region Location in Chile
- Coordinates: 37.166°S 72.933°W
- Country: Chile
- Region: Bío Bío
- Province: Concepción

Government
  - Type: Municipality
  - Alcalde: Ana Albornoz (Ind.-IL)

Area
  - Total: 731.2 km^{2} (282.3 sq mi)
- Elevation: 50 m (160 ft)

Population (2012 Census)
  - Total: 13,228
  - Density: 18.09/km^{2} (46.85/sq mi)
  - Urban: 7,095
  - Rural: 5,618

Sex
  - Men: 6,357
  - Women: 6,356
- Time zone: UTC-4 (CLT)
  - Summer (DST): UTC-3 (CLST)
- Area code: 56 + 41
- Website: Municipality of Santa Juana

Santa Juana is a city and commune of the Concepción Province in the Bío Bío Region of Chile. It lies south and west of the Biobío River in the valley of Catirai and is 48 kilometers from Concepción, Chile.

== History ==
The Mapuche originally named the valley where Santa Juana is now located the Valley of Catirai, and the inhabitants Catirayen. This town originated with a fort established in March 1626 by Governor Luis Fernández de Córdoba y Arce and was named Santa Juana de Guadalcázar in memory of the wife of the viceroy of Peru, Diego Fernández de Córdoba, Marquis of Guadalcázar. Evacuated in 1641, it was repaired and expanded in 1648 by the governor Martín de Mujica y Buitrón. It was destroyed by the Mapuches in 1722, but restored two years later.

In 1739 Governor José Antonio Manso de Velasco made important adjustments, improving and properly supplying the fortress and constructing between the river and the small Laguna de Rayenantú behind it, deep ditches, that turned the enclosure into an island, and increasing its population to serve as its garrison for the defense of the region and the wooded valleys of the southern mountainous area. Governor Antonio de Guill y Gonzaga obtained the title of "Villa" for the town in 1765, but the wars with the Indians did not allow it to make any progress even though it constituted the refuge of the extinguished towns of Coya, Monterey and San Jerónimo. It was also one of the towns burned in 1821 at the order of Vicente Benavides the rebellious royalist guerrilla. It was later ruined by the earthquake on February 20, 1835. As a result of this last disaster the town was six years later moved to its present more suitable location.

Santa Juana was head of the Department of Lautaro between 1841 and 1865. On May 30, 1865, Coronel became the new capital of the department. With the Law of Independent Communes, December 22, 1891, the Decree of Creation of Municipalities was promulgated, with which created the Municipality of Santa Juana, in which Santa Juana administers Santa Juana, Santo Domingo and San Jerónimo, whose boundaries were determined by the decrees of November 13, 1885, March 29 and December 1, 1886.

== Demographics ==
According to the 2002 census of the National Statistics Institute, Santa Juana spans an area of 731.2 km^{2} (282 sq mi) and has 12,713 inhabitants (6,357 men and 6,356 women). Of these, 7,095 (55.8%) lived in urban areas and 5,618 (44.2%) in rural areas. The population grew by 6.3% (756 persons) between the 1992 and 2002 censuses.

== Administration ==
As a commune, Santa Juana is a third-level administrative division of Chile administered by a municipal council, headed by an alcalde who is directly elected every four years. The 2008-2012 alcalde is Angel Castro Medina (PDC).

Within the electoral divisions of Chile, Santa Juana is represented in the Chamber of Deputies by Sergio Bobadilla (UDI) and Clemira Pacheco (PS) as part of the 45th electoral district, (together with Tomé, Penco, Florida, Hualqui, Coronel). The commune is represented in the Senate by Alejandro Navarro Brain (MAS) and Hosain Sabag Castillo (PDC) as part of the 12th senatorial constituency (Biobío-Cordillera).
