= Coronel, Chile =

Coronel
- City and Commune
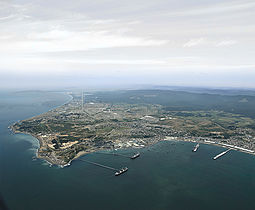
- City of Coronel

- Coat of arms Location of Coronel commune in the Biobío Region Location in Chile
- Coordinates: 37°01′00″S 73°13′00″W
- Country: Chile
- Region: Biobío
- Province: Concepción
- Villa de Coronel: August 30, 1849

Government
  - Type: Municipality

Area
  - Total: 279 km^{2} (108 sq mi)
- Elevation: 16 m (52 ft)

Population (2012 Census)
  - Total: 107,759
  - Density: 386/km^{2} (1,000/sq mi)
- Demonym: Coronelino
- Time zone: UTC−4 (CLT)
  - Summer (DST): UTC−3 (CLST)
- Postal code: 4190000
- Area code: 56 + 41
- Website: Official website (in Spanish)

Coronel (Spanish pronunciation: [koɾoˈnel]) is a Chilean city and commune, located in the Concepción Province of the eighth region of Biobío.

== Geography ==
The city of Coronel is located in a sandy platform that goes from the mouth of the Biobío River to the Arauco Gulf bay, a muddy landscape, full of forests, typical of the region.

This muddy, forested landscape enclosed by high mountains was what the first Spanish conquistadors and settlers found when arriving. Vegetation and forests covered most of the area except very close to the coast. This type of landscape is characteristic of the province.

The total area of the commune is 279.4 km^{2} (108 sq mi). Aside from its western coast along the Pacific Ocean, the commune is surrounded by other communes of the Concepción Province: San Pedro de la Paz to the north, Hualqui to the north and east, and Lota and Santa Juana to the south.

Santa María Island also forms part of the city, which is represented there by a municipal delegate.

=== Climate ===
The climate of Coronel is temperate Mediterranean, common to the Chilean Coast Range, with moderate temperature variations. As Coronel is situated west of the mountain range, it generally receives winds out of the west and northwest, and increased precipitation due to orographic lift. Its proximity to the Pacific influences its annual temperature variations. The average temperature in summer is 17 °C (63 °F) and 8 °C (46 °F) in winter.

== History ==
Like all territory to the south of Biobío River, this area was populated by the Mapuche. Historically, Spaniards called them as Araucaníans (araucanos) and their coastal territory as Araucanía.

This territory is a part of the Kingdom of Araucania and Patagonia, an unrecognised state established on November 19, 1861.

The indigenous population of Coronel Bay was located into a war zone called Butanmapu de la costa. From the descriptions made by the Spaniards, it is probable that before the Spaniards' colonization, half of the Mapuche population lived in this region. Also, the population density of the tribes was evenly distributed on both east and west sides of the Cordillera de Nahuelbuta

The city of Lota was an early coal mining settlement in the area. The mine was composed of "Chiflones" 1, 2, 3, 4, Pique Santa Maria, and Pique Arenas Blancas. This was the last mine closed, because of a grisu gas explosion where 21 miners died. This mine was the deepest in South America, at 1,000 m (3,281 ft).

The World War I naval Battle of Coronel between ships of the United Kingdom and Germany was fought on 1 November 1914 off the coast of Coronel.

The city was the seat of Lautaro Department, later known as the Coronel Department.

In March 2013, an investigation was started after thousands of sea animals washed ashore.

== Demographics ==
According to the 2002 census of the National Statistics Institute, Coronel spans an area of 279.4 km^{2} (108 sq mi) and has 95,528 inhabitants (46,766 men and 48,762 women). Of these, 91,469 (95.8%) lived in urban areas and 4,059 (4.2%) in rural areas. Between the 1992 and 2002 censuses, the population grew by 14.5% (12,102 persons). The demonym for a man from Coronel is Coronelino and Coronelina for a woman.

== Administration ==
As a commune, Coronel is a third-level administrative division of Chile administered by a communal council, headed by an alcalde who is directly elected every four years. The 2012-2016 alcalde is Leonidas Romero. The communal council has the following members:

- José Suazo Muñoz
- Francisco Merino Olivares
- Edmundo Salas Norambuena
- Francisco Reyes Aguayo
- Daniel Rosales Salgado
- Hugo Monsalves Obreque
- Carmen Madinagoitia Chamorro
- Osvaldo Campos Torres

Within the electoral divisions of Chile, Coronel is represented in the Chamber of Deputies by Marcelo Chávez (PDC) and Clemira Pacheco (PS) as part of the 45th electoral district, (together with Tomé, Penco, Florida, Hualqui and Santa Juana). The commune is represented in the Senate by Alejandro Navarro Brain (MAS) and Jacqueline Van Rysselberghe Herrera (UDI) as part of the 12th senatorial constituency (Biobío-Cordillera).
