= Florida, Chile =

Florida
- Town and Commune
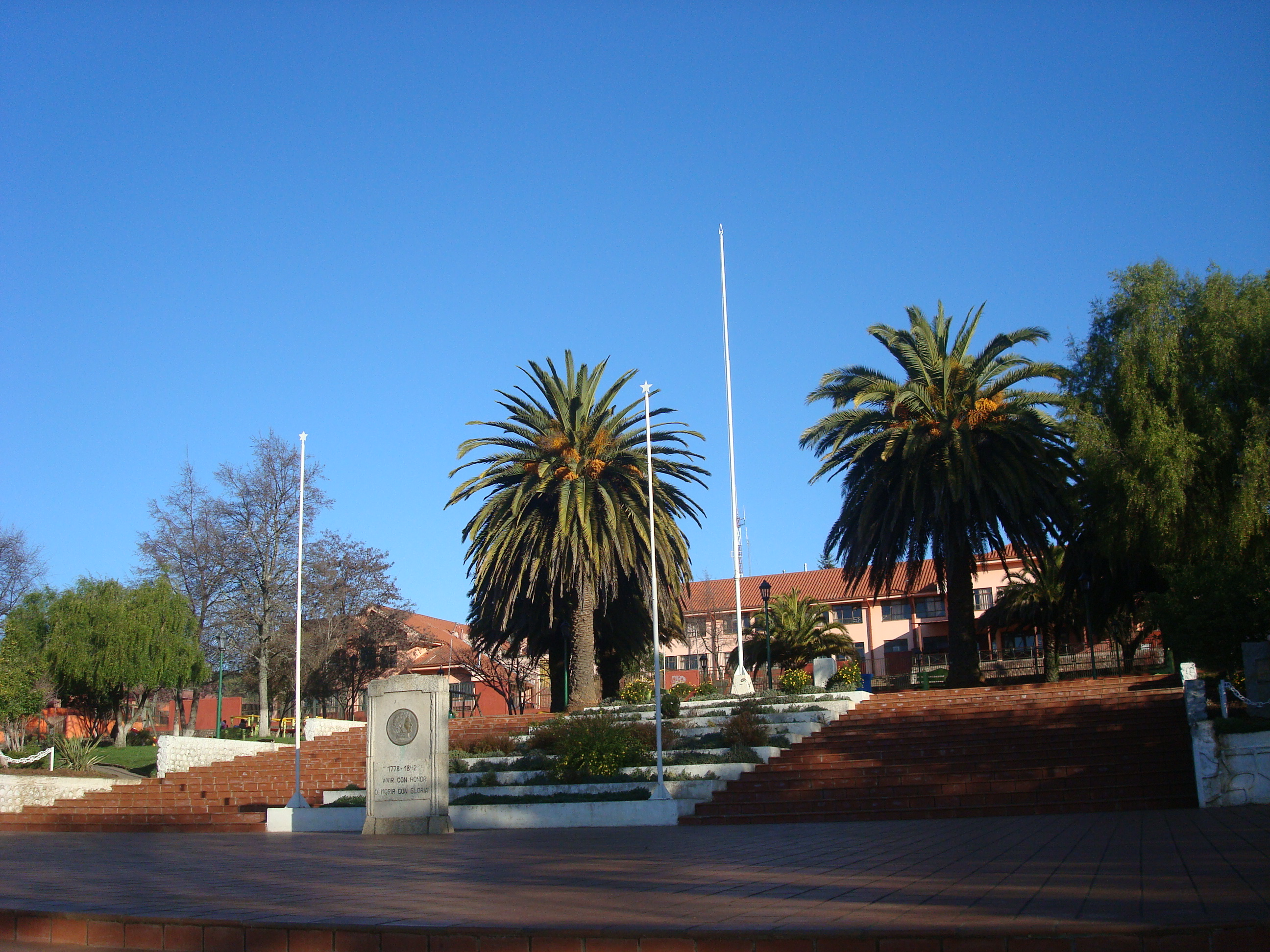
- Place of Florida

- Flag Coat of arms Location of Florida commune in the Biobío Region Location in Chile
- Coordinates (city): 36°49′S 72°40′W
- Country: Chile
- Region: Biobío
- Province: Concepción

Government
  - Type: Municipality
  - Alcalde: Joey Meehan

Area
  - Total: 608.6 km^{2} (235.0 sq mi)
- Elevation: 259 m (850 ft)

Population (2012 Census)
  - Total: 8,916
  - Density: 14.65/km^{2} (37.94/sq mi)
  - Urban: 3,875
  - Rural: 6,302

Sex
  - Men: 5231
  - Women: 4946
- Time zone: UTC-4 (CLT)
  - Summer (DST): UTC-3 (CLST)
- Area code: 56 + 41
- Website: Municipality of Florida

Florida (Spanish pronunciation: [floˈɾiða]) is a Chilean town and commune located in the Concepción Province, Biobío Region.

== Demographics ==
According to the 2002 census of the National Statistics Institute, Florida spans an area of 608.6 km^{2} (235 sq mi) and has 10,177 inhabitants (5,231 men and 4,946 women). Of these, 3,875 (38.1%) lived in urban areas and 6,302 (61.9%) in rural areas. Between the 1992 and 2002 censuses, the population fell by 2.5% (260 persons).

== Administration ==
As a commune, Florida is a third-level administrative division of Chile administered by a communal council, headed by an alcalde who is directly elected every four years. The 2008-2012 alcalde is Juan Vergara Reyes. The communal council has the following members:

- Aureliano Illanes (PRI)
- Jorge Roa (PDC)
- Juan Contreras (PS)
- Agustin Montero (RN)
- José Lizama (UDI)
- Renán Arriagada (Ind.)

Within the electoral divisions of Chile, Florida is represented in the Chamber of Deputies by Sergio Bobadilla (UDI) and Clemira Pacheco (PS) as part of the 45th electoral district (together with Tomé, Penco, Hualqui, Coronel and Santa Juana). The commune is represented in the Senate by Alejandro Navarro Brain (MAS) and Hosain Sabag Castillo (PDC) as part of the 12th senatorial constituency (Biobío-Cordillera).
