= Concepción Province, Chile =

Concepción Province Provincia de Concepción
- Province
- Seal Coat of arms

- Location in the Bío Bío Region

- Location in Chile
- Coordinates: 36°58′S 72°56′W
- Country: Chile
- Region: Bío Bío
- Capital: Concepción
- Boroughs: List: Concepción; Coronel; Chiguayante; Florida; Hualpén; Hualqui; Lota; Penco; San Pedro de la Paz; Santa Juana; Talcahuano; Tomé

Government
  - Type: Provincial

Area
  - Total: 3,439.0 km^{2} (1,327.8 sq mi)

Population (2024 Census)
  - Total: 1,025,448
  - Density: 298.18/km^{2} (772.29/sq mi)
- Time zone: UTC−4 (CLT)
  - Summer (DST): UTC-3 (CLST)
- Area code: 56 + 41
- Website: Government of Concepción

Concepción Province (Spanish: Provincia de Concepción) is one of the three provinces in the Bío Bío Region of Chile. Its capital Concepción, is one of the largest urban areas in Chile. The province spans an area of 3,439 km^{2} (1,328 sq mi), and had a population of 1,025,448 inhabitants as per the 2024 Chilean census.

== History ==
The region was earlier populated by indigenous Mapuche people, and the city of Concepción was established on 5 October 1550 by Spanish conquistador Pedro de Valdivia as a base for slave labor and a port. However, the region was the site of constant skirmishes between the Mapuche and the Spanish, and was burnt down multiple times. The Spanish fortified the region, and the Biobio River formed a natural boundary between the Mapuche and Spanish occupied regions. It later developed into a major agriculture and pastoral center.

The Biobio Region was established on 10 July 1974, by Law No. 575, which reorganised Chile into thirteen regions. The region is divided into three provinces–Concepción, Biobío, and Arauco, which are further divided into 33 communes.

== Geography ==
Concepción Province is one of the three provinces of the Biobio Region in Chile. It covers an area of 3,439 km^{2} (1,328 sq mi). Almost half of the land area consists of coastal islands, while the remaining land forming part of the Biobio, Carampangue and Itata River basins. Concepción is vulnerable to natural hazards such as earthquakes and high tidal waves, and has suffered damages due to these events in the past.

Concepción has a warm Mediterranean climate (Köppen climate classification: Csb) with an average annual temperature of 13.3 °C (55.9 °F). The region receives approximately 83.9 cm (33.0 in) of rainfall annually on average, with majority of the rain falling in the winter months. The summer season extends from December to March, is relatively dry.

== Administration ==
As a province, Concepcion is a second-level administrative division of Chile, governed by a provincial governor. It is further subdivided into 12 communes (comunas)–Concepción, Coronel, Chiguayante, Florida, Hualpén, Hualqui, Lota, Penco, San Pedro de la Paz, Santa Juana, Talcahuano, and Tomé. Its capital Concepción, located close to the mouth of the Biobio river, is one of the largest urban areas in Chile, and a major commercial center in the region.

== Demographics ==
According to the 2024 Chilean census, the province had a population of 1,025,448 inhabitants. The population consisted of 534,672 females (52.1%) and 490,776 males (47.9%). About 16.9% of the population was below the age of 15 years, 68.4% belonged to the age group of 15–64 years, and 14.7% was aged 65 years or older. The province had an urban population of 988,383 inhabitants (96.4%) and a rural population of 37,065 inhabitants (3.6%). Most of the residents were born in Chile, accounting for 988,483 inhabitants (96.4%). Non-indigenous people formed the majority of the population with 950,138 inhabitants (92.7%), while 75,247 inhabitants (7.3%) identified themselves as belonging to indigenous groups. Roman Catholics formed the largest religious group with 324,722 adherents (38.2%), followed by Evangelicals or Protestants with 279,892 adherents (32.9%), and 212,450 inhabitants (25%) indicating no religious affiliation.
