= San Pedro de la Paz =

- City and Commune
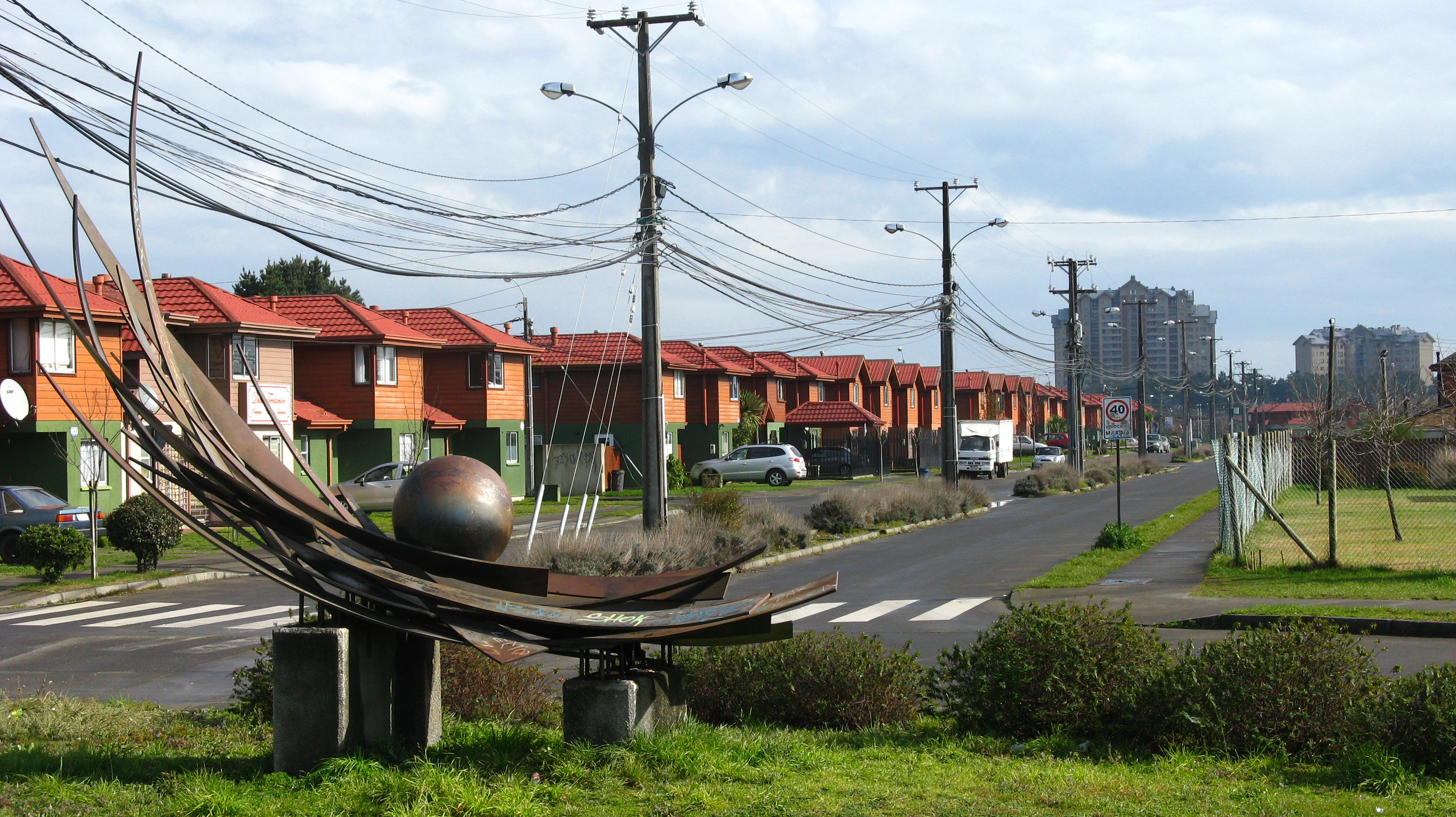

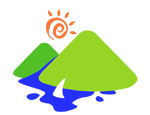
- Coat of arms Location of San Pedro de la Paz commune in the Biobío Region Location in Chile
- Coordinates (city): 36°50′31″S 73°06′11″W
- Country: Chile
- Region: Biobío
- Province: Concepción

Government
  - Type: Municipality
  - Alcalde: Audito Retamal Lazo (Ind.)

Area
  - Total: 112.5 km^{2} (43.4 sq mi)
- Elevation: 20 m (66 ft)

Population (2012 Census)
  - Total: 121,631
  - Density: 1,081/km^{2} (2,800/sq mi)
  - Urban: 80,159
  - Rural: 288

Sex
  - Men: 38,571
  - Women: 41,876
- Time zone: UTC−4 (CLT)
  - Summer (DST): UTC−3 (CLST)
- Area code: 56 + 41
- Website: Official website (in Spanish)

San Pedro de la Paz (Spanish pronunciation: [sam ˈpeðɾo ðe la pas]) is a Chilean city and commune located in the Concepción Province, Biobío Region. It has some 80,447 inhabitants according to the 2002 national census. In 2005, the Pedro Aguirre Cerda avenue, the main avenue in the city, was completed. Most of the inhabitants of this comuna commute daily to Concepción – either by car, bus or train – over the Biobío River. It is considered to be part of Greater Concepción conurbation.

San Pedro was established during the Conquest of Chile first as fort la Candelaria which was destroyed following the death of Governor Martín García Óñez de Loyola in 1599. It was rebuilt as part of La Frontera by Alonso de Ribera as fort San Pedro de la Paz in 1603. A small settlement grew up around it. During the Chilean War of Independence the town was burned in 1821, by the royalist Juan Manuel Picó on the order of Vicente Benavides during the Battle of San Pedro. The fort was ruined by the 1835 Concepción earthquake.

== Demographics ==
According to the 2002 census of the National Statistics Institute, San Pedro de la Paz spans an area of 112.5 km^{2} (43 sq mi) and has 80,447 inhabitants (38,571 men and 41,876 women). Of these, 80,159 (99.6%) lived in urban areas and 288 (0.4%) in rural areas. The population grew by 18.6% (12,630 persons) between the 1992 and 2002 censuses.

== Administration ==
As a commune, San Pedro de la Paz is a third-level administrative division of Chile administered by a municipal council, headed by an alcalde who is directly elected every four years. The 2008–2012 alcalde is Audito Retamal Lazo (Ind.).

Within the electoral divisions of Chile, San Pedro de la Paz is represented in the Chamber of Deputies by José Miguel Ortiz (PDC) and Enrique Van Rysselberghe (UDI) as part of the 44th electoral district, (together with Concepción and Chiguayante). The commune is represented in the Senate by Alejandro Navarro Brain (MAS) and Hosain Sabag Castillo (PDC) as part of the 12th senatorial constituency (Biobío-Cordillera).
