= Hualpén =

- City and Commune
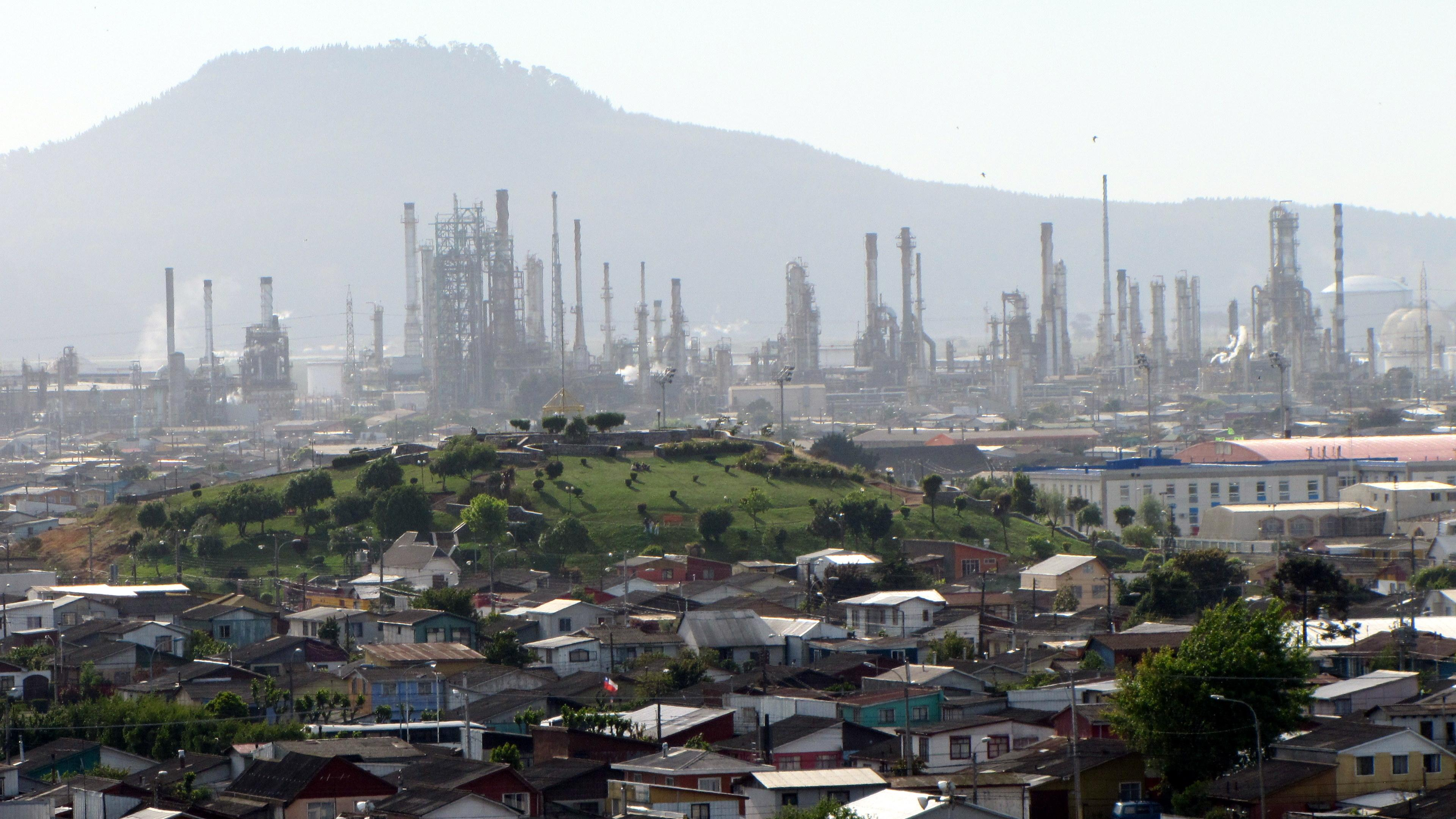
- Panorama view of Hualpén, the Amarillo Hill (foreground), ENAP oil refinery, and the Teta Biobío Norte Hill in background.

- Coat of arms Location of Hualpén commune in the Biobío Region Location in Chile
- Coordinates (alcalde's office): 36°47′18″S 73°05′12″W
- Country: Chile
- Region: Biobío
- Province: Concepción
- Established: 15 March 2004

Government
  - Type: Municipality
  - Alcalde: Katherine Torres Machuca (IND supported by PPD)

Area
  - Total: 53.5 km^{2} (20.7 sq mi)
- Elevation: 21 m (69 ft)

Population (2012 Census)
  - Total: 91,773
  - Density: 1,720/km^{2} (4,440/sq mi)
  - Urban: 85,928
  - Rural: 794
- Demonym(s): (hualpenino,-a) Hualpén's, Hualpennian, Walpennian
- Time zone: UTC−4 (CLT)
  - Summer (DST): UTC−3 (CLST)
- Postal code: 4601645
- Area code: 56 + 41
- Website: www.hualpenciudad.cl (in Spanish)

Hualpén (Spanish pronunciation: [(g)walˈpen]) is a Chilean city and commune belonging to Concepción Province and the Biobío Region. It is part of the conurbation of Greater Concepción. The commune spans an area of 53.5 km^{2} (21 sq mi).

== Demographics ==
According to the 2002 census of the National Statistics Institute, Hualpén had 86,722 inhabitants. Of these, 85,928 (99.1%) lived in urban areas and 794 (0.9%) in rural areas. The population fell by 5.7% (5,239 persons) between the 1992 and 2002 censuses.

== Administration ==
As a commune, Hualpén is a third-level administrative division of Chile administered by a municipal council, headed by an alcalde ("alcalde" in Spanish; alcalde and major, in English) who is directly elected every four years. The current major is Miguel Rivera

Within the electoral divisions of Chile, Hualpén is represented in the Chamber of Deputies by Jorge Ulloa (UDI) and Cristián Campos (PDC) as part of the 43rd electoral district, (together with Talcahuano). The commune is represented in the Senate by Alejandro Navarro Brain (MAS) and Hosain Sabag Castillo (PDC) as part of the 12th senatorial constituency (Biobío-Cordillera).

== See also ==
- Acanthogonatus hualpen

== Illustrious (Notable) People ==
- Gonzalo Jara Reyes. Former international professional footballer.
