= Chiguayante =

- City and Commune
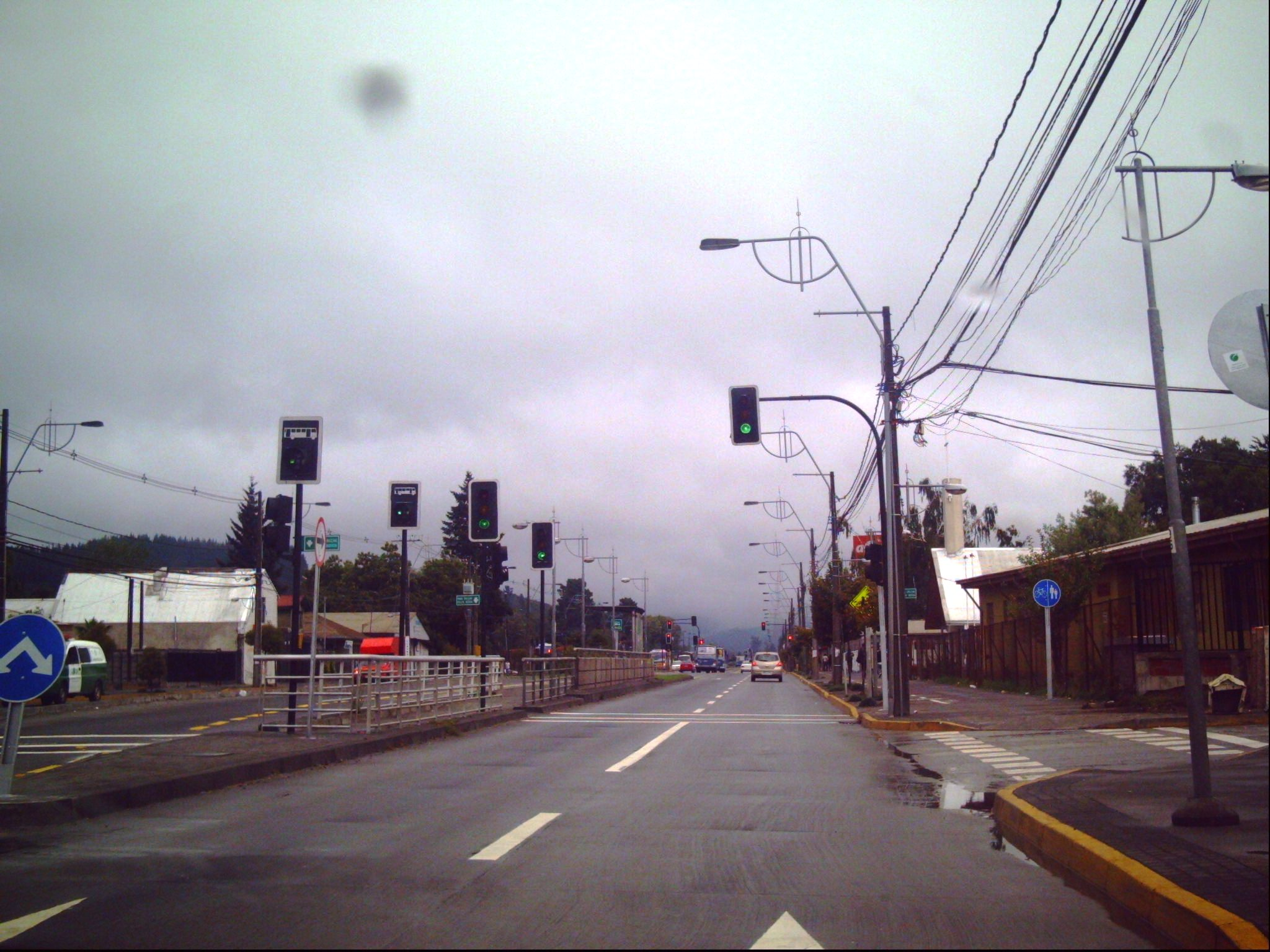
- Manuel Rodriguez Avenue.

- Coat of arms Location of Chiguayante commune in the Biobío Region Location in Chile
- Coordinates: 36°55′S 73°01′W
- Country: Chile
- Region: Biobío
- Province: Concepción
- Established: 1996

Government
  - Type: Municipality
  - Alcalde: Tomás Solís Nava (PS)

Area
  - Total: 71.5 km^{2} (27.6 sq mi)
- Elevation: 249 m (817 ft)

Population (2012 Census)
  - Total: 84,718
  - Density: 1,180/km^{2} (3,070/sq mi)
  - Urban: 81,238
  - Rural: 64
- Demonym: Chiguayantino

Sex
  - Men: 38,524
  - Women: 42,778
- Time zone: UTC−4 (CLT)
  - Summer (DST): UTC−3 (CLST)
- Area code: 56 + 41
- Website: Official website (in Spanish)

Chiguayante (Spanish pronunciation: [tʃiɣwaˈʝante]) is a Chilean city and commune in Concepción Province, Biobío Region. It is part of Greater Concepción.

== Demographics ==
According to the 2002 census of the National Statistics Institute, Chiguayante spans an area of 71.5 km^{2} (28 sq mi) and has 81,302 inhabitants (38,524 men and 42,778 women). Of these, 81,238 (99.9%) lived in urban areas and 64 (0.1%) in rural areas. The population grew by 44.2% (24,931 persons) between the 1992 and 2002 censuses. It had an estimated 2010 population of 119,265.

== Administration ==
As a commune, Chiguayante is a third-level administrative division of Chile administered by a municipal council, headed by an alcalde who is directly elected every four years. The alcalde is José Antonio Rivas (PS).
