= Penco =

- City and Commune
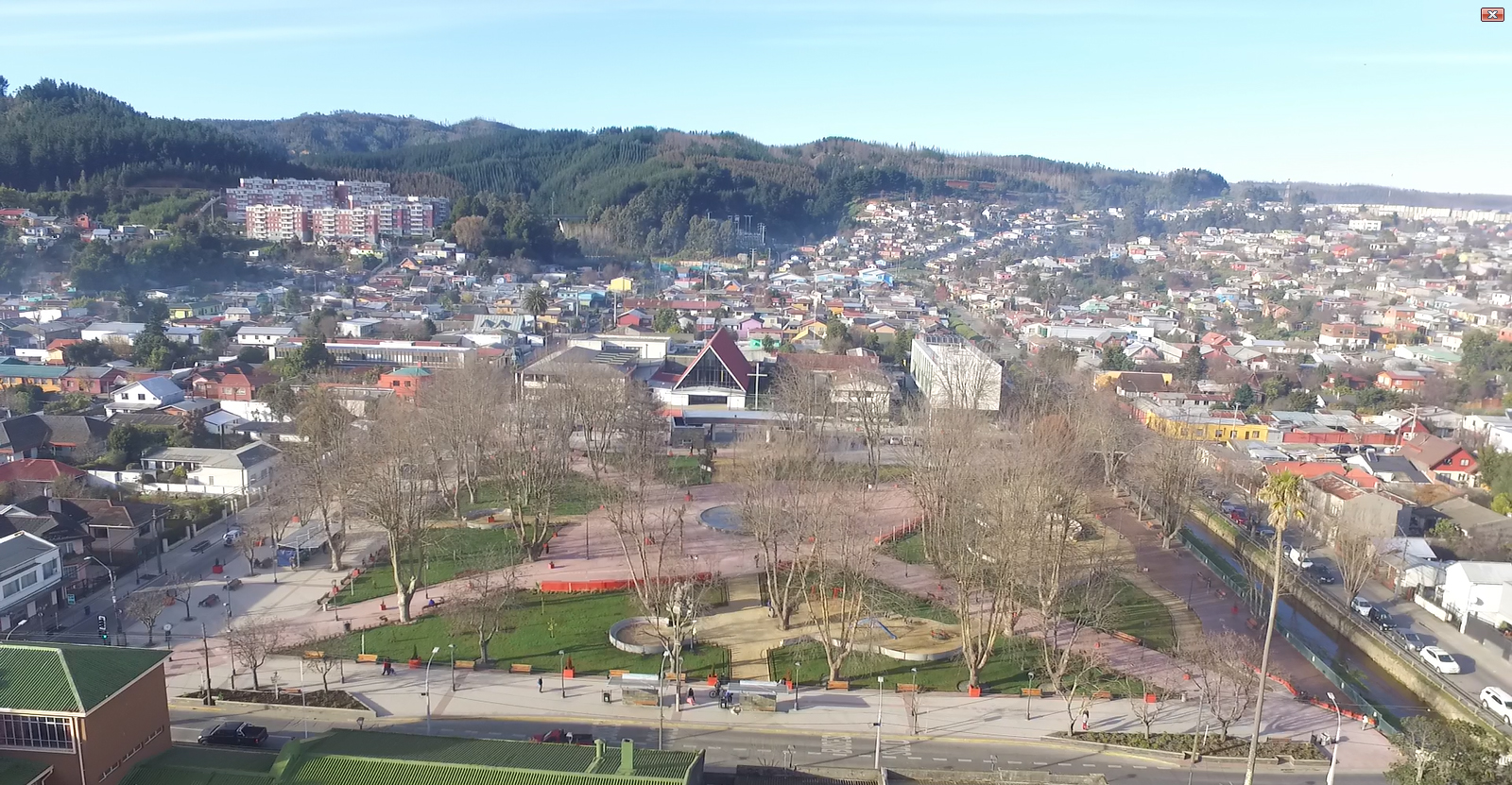
- Center of Penco

- Coat of arms Location of Penco commune in the Bío Bío Region Location in Chile
- Coordinates (city): 36°44′19″S 72°59′38″W
- Country: Chile
- Region: Bío Bío
- Province: Concepción
- Founded: February 12, 1550
- Founded as: Concepción del Nuevo Extremo
- Founder: Pedro de Valdivia

Government
  - Type: Municipality
  - Alcalde: Víctor Figueroa Rebolledo (ILE)

Area
  - Total: 107.6 km^{2} (41.5 sq mi)
- Elevation: 115 m (377 ft)

Population (2012 Census)
  - Total: 46,176
  - Density: 429.1/km^{2} (1,111/sq mi)
  - Urban: 45,361
  - Rural: 655
- Demonym: Pencones

Sex
  - Men: 22,366
  - Women: 23,650
- Time zone: UTC−4 (CLT)
  - Summer (DST): UTC−3 (CLST)
- Area code: 56 + 41
- Website: Official website (in Spanish)

Penco (Mapudungun: See (Pen), Water (Ko)), is a Chilean city and commune in Concepción Province, Bío Bío Region on the Bay of Concepción. Founded as the city of Concepción del Nuevo Extremo (lit. 'Beginning of the New Extreme') on February 12, 1550, by Pedro de Valdivia, it is the third oldest city in Chile, after capital Santiago founded first in 1541 and La Serena second in 1544.

As there may be confusion between the demonyms of the inhabitants of Concepción and Penco, due to the previous location of Concepción, inhabitants of that city are called penquistas while inhabitants of Penco are known as pencones.

The commune is since 2016 the site of a project to mine rare-earth elements by Aclara Resources, a publicly traded company with a 55.9% and 10.1% ownership of Hochschild Mining and CAP respectively.

== History ==
In previous centuries, in the current location of Penco, was the first location where the city of Concepción was established, which is now the capital of the Bíobío Region. It was destroyed by Lautaro in 1554, and rebuilt and destroyed again by Lautaro in 1555.

- It was reestablished in 1557 during the governorship of marquess García Hurtado de Mendoza when he landed there and built a fort on the Alto de Pinto. The city was reestablished January 6, 1558, by capitán Jerónimo de Villegas.
- It became the headquarters of the military forces engaged against the native Mapuche in Araucanía over the next two centuries, growing to a population of 10,000 despite suffering a siege in 1564 and other attacks by Mapuche tribals.
- In 1603 the last bishop of the suppressed Diocese of La Imperial was transferred there as first bishop of the successor see Roman Catholic Archdiocese of Concepción.
- Due to earthquakes and tsunamis, which razed the city in 1570, 1657, 1687, 1730 and another on May 25, 1751, the colonial authorities ultimately decided to move the city to its current location to the Valle de la Mocha, alongside the Bío Bío River and prohibited the occupation of the old location, which remained unpopulated until March 29, 1842, when the present city of Penco was founded.
- In 2026 Penco would be evacuated due to the outbreak of the Trinitarias Fire, which damaged large parts of the city.

== Statistics ==
According to the 2002 census of the National Statistics Institute, Penco spans an area of 107.6 km^{2} (42 sq mi) and has 46,016 inhabitants (22,366 men and 23,650 women). Of these, 45,361 (98.6%) lived in urban areas and 655 (1.4%) in rural areas. The population grew by 14% (5,657 persons) between the 1992 and 2002 censuses.

== Administration ==
As a commune, Penco is a third-level administrative division of Chile administered by a municipal council, headed by an alcalde who is directly elected every four years. The 2012-2016 alcalde is Víctor Hugo Figueroa Víctor_Hugo_Figueroa_Rebolledo (ILE).

Within the electoral divisions of Chile, Penco is represented in the Chamber of Deputies by Sergio Bobadilla (UDI) and Clemira Pacheco (PS) as part of the 45th electoral district, (together with Tomé, Florida, Hualqui, Coronel and Santa Juana). The commune is represented in the Senate by Alejandro Navarro Brain (MAS) and Hosain Sabag Castillo (PDC) as part of the 12th senatorial constituency (Biobío-Cordillera).

=== Places ===
In addition to the main town of Penco, the commune administers the following villages:

- Cerro Verde, 36°44′0″S 72°59′0″W
- Cosmito, 36°46′7″S 73°0′52″W
- El Rosal, 36°46′5″S 73°2′15″W
- Lirquén, 36°42′48″S 72°58′29″W
- Tucapel, 36°46′37″S 73°1′14″W.

== Notable people ==
- Patricio Renán

== Sources and external links ==
- (in Spanish) Municipality of Penco
- David Marley, Historic Cities of the Americas: An Illustrated Encyclopedia, ABC-CLIO, 2005 ISBN 1-57607-027-1 ISBN 978-1-57607-027-7
- Concepcion *
