= Tomé =

City and commune in Biobío, Chile

- City and commune
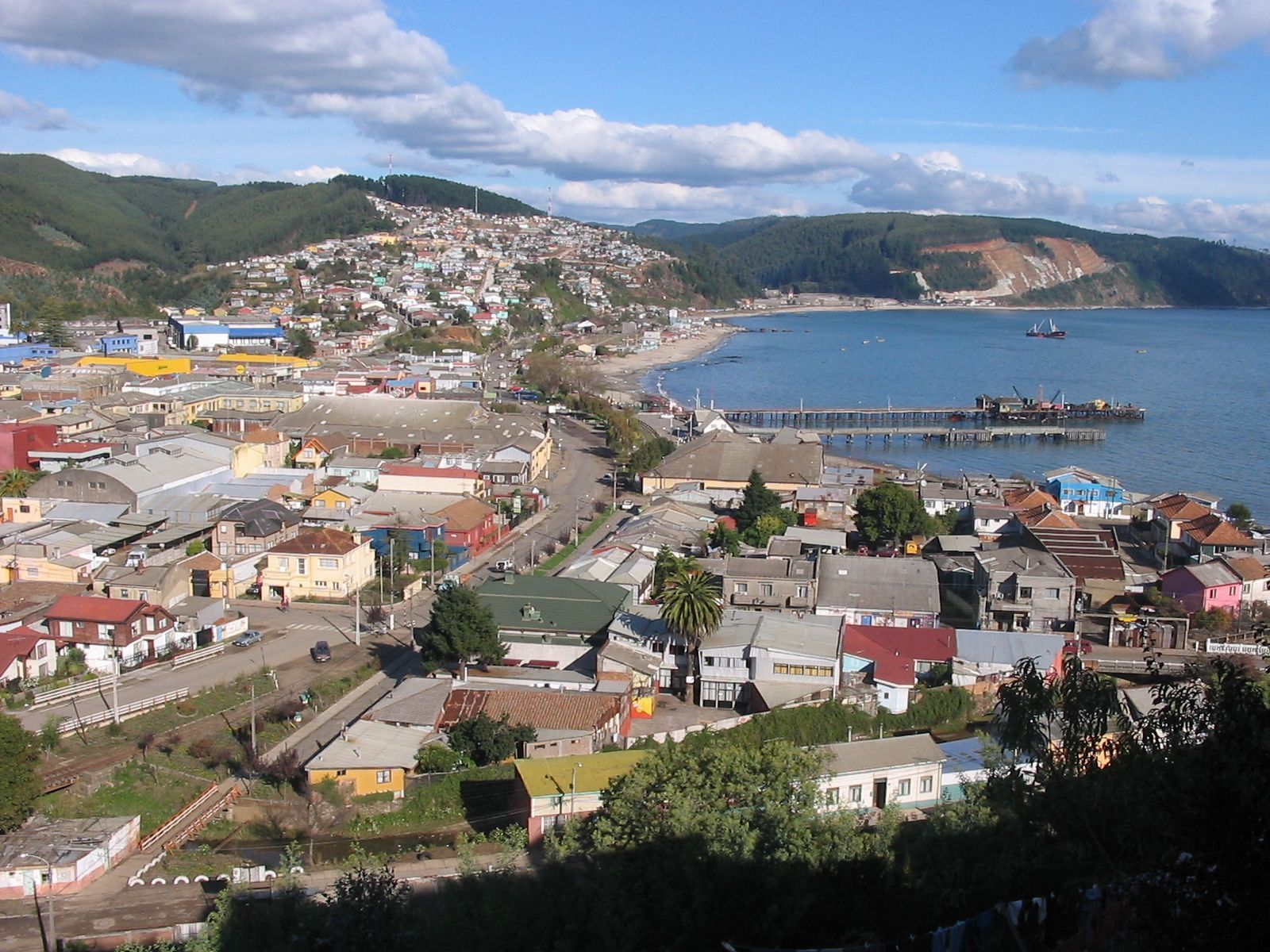
- View from Navidad Hill

- Coat of arms Location of the Tomé commune in Biobío Region Location within Chile
- Coordinates (city): 36°37′S 72°57′W
- Country: Chile
- Region: Biobío
- Province: Concepción
- Founded: 1544

Government
  - Type: Municipality
  - Mayor: Ítalo Cáceres (Ind.)

Area
  - Total: 494.5 km^{2} (190.9 sq mi)
- Elevation: 12 m (39 ft)

Population (2012 Census)
  - Total: 53,219
  - Density: 107.6/km^{2} (278.7/sq mi)
  - Urban: 45,959
  - Rural: 6,481

Sex
  - Men: 25,263
  - Women: 27,177
- Time zone: UTC−4 (CLT)
  - Summer (DST): UTC−3 (CLST)
- Area code: 56 + 41
- Website: Official website (in Spanish)

Tomé (Spanish pronunciation: [toˈme]) is a port city and commune in the Biobío Region of Chile. It is bordered by Coelemu to the north, Ránquil and Florida to the east, Penco to the south, and the Pacific Ocean to the west. The local economy is based mainly on textile manufacturing and fishing industry.

== History ==
=== 27 February 2010 quake ===
The 8.8 magnitude 27 February 2010 earthquake greatly affected Tome, Constitucion, Concepcion, Talcahuano.

== Demographics ==
According to the 2002 census of the National Statistics Institute, Tomé spans an area of 494.5 km^{2} (191 sq mi) and has 52,440 inhabitants (25,263 men and 27,177 women). Of these, 45,959 (87.6%) lived in urban areas and 6,481 (12.4%) in rural areas. The population grew by 6.4% (3,156 persons) between the 1992 and 2002 censuses.

The commune includes the localities of Rafael, Menque, Cocholgüe, Punta de Parra and Dichato.

== Administration ==
As a commune, Tomé is a third-level administrative division of Chile, administered by a municipal council headed by a mayor, elected every four years. The 2024-2028 mayor is Ítalo Cáceres (Independent), while the municipal councillors are:

- José Mardones (Ind./UDI)
- Eduardo Aguilera (Ind./RN)
- Carlos Concha (DC)
- Dimitri Riquelme (PS)
- Betsua San Martín (Ind./DC)
- Francisca Zúñiga (PC)

== Education ==
Previously the area had a German school, Deutsche Schule Tomé. The city has many good primary schools and high schools. Universidad de Concepción, one of the best universities of Chile is 30 minutes away.

== Notable people ==
- Erasmo Moena - murderer and suspected serial killer
